= List of flora of the Mojave Desert region =

This list of flora of the Mojave Desert region catalogs the particular plants (flora) of the Mojave Desert and of the mountains that encircle the Mojave Desert, including the Little San Bernardino Mountains that divide the Mojave Desert from the Colorado Desert. Some flora grows well above the elevational limit of Yucca brevifolia (Joshua tree). The elevational limit of the Joshua tree delimits (marks the boundary of) the Mojave Desert.

The flora herein is arranged in several sublists to accommodate the various interests among readers; the sublists are arranged a) alphabetically by scientific name; b) alphabetically by plant family and then by scientific name; c) by growth pattern (e.g., tree, shrub, perennial) and then alphabetically by scientific name; d) by flower color (with duplicate entries when flower colors vary for a single species); and e) alphabetically by common name.

Each entry in the alphabetical list by scientific name is followed by the common name(s) (in bold and in parentheses), plant family, growth form(s), flower color(s), and a brief note on the etymology of the components of the scientific name.

== List by scientific name ==
=== A ===
- Abronia nana S. Watson var. covillei; (Coville's dwarf abronia); Nyctaginaceae; perennial herb; white, lavender, pink flowers; June–August bloom; "Abronia" from Greek "abros" = "graceful or delicate" re bracts below flowers, "nana" = "small" from the Greek "nannos" = "dwarf"
- Abronia pogonantha (Mojave sand-verbena), Nyctaginaceae; "Abronia" from Greek "abros" = "graceful or delicate" (re bracts below flowers), Greek "pogon" = "beard" & "anthus" = "flowered" -> "pogonantha" = "bearded flowers"
- Abronia villosa var. villosa (desert sand-verbena), Nyctaginaceae four o'clock family; "Abronia" from Greek "abros" = "graceful or delicate" (re bracts below flowers), "villosa" = "hairy"
- Acacia greggii (renamed to Senegalia greggii)
- Acamptopappus shockleyi (Shockley's goldenhead); Asteraceae; Greek "a-kamptos" = "not-bent" & "pappos" = "pappus" (bristly sepals in Asteraceae flowers) -> "acamptopappus" = "unbent pappus", "shockleyi" = William Hillman Shockley - first to collect plants in the White Mountains
- Acamptopappus sphaerocephalus (rayless goldenhead); Asteraceae; Greek "a-kamptos" = "not-bent" & "pappos" = "pappus" (bristly sepals in Asteraceae flowers) -> "acamptopappus" = "unbent pappus", Greek "sphaero" = "sphere", "cephalis" = "Head" -> or "round-headed" (flower heads)
- Achyronychia cooperi (frost mat onyx flower), Caryophyllaceae
- Acmispon americanus, Fabaceae; Greek "acme" = "point or edge" for hook-tipped fruit, "americanus" = "of America"
- Acmispon argophyllus, Fabaceae; Greek "acme" = "point or edge" for hook-tipped fruit of genus type, "argos" "shining, bright, silver" -> "argophyllus" = "silver leaved"
- Acmispon brachycarpus, Fabaceae; Greek "acme" = "point or edge" for hook-tipped fruit of genus type, "brachy" = "short", "karpos" = "fruit" -> "brachycarpus" = "short-bodied (fruit)"
- Acmispon glaber, Fabaceae; Greek "acme" = "point or edge" for hook-tipped fruit of genus type, -> "glaber" = "without hairs", glabrous
- Acmispon tomentosus var. glabriusculus (syn. Acmispon heermanniii, Heermann's lotus) Fabaceae; Greek "acme" = "point or edge" for hook-tipped fruit of genus type
- Acmispon rigidus (desert rock-pea, Fabaceae; Greek "acme" = "point or edge" for hook-tipped fruit of genus type,
- Acmispon strigosus (stiff-haired lotus), Fabaceae; Greek "acme" = "point or edge" for hook-tipped fruit of genus type,
- Adenophyllum cooperi (Cooper's dyssodia, Cooper's glandweed), Asteraceae
- Aliciella latifolia (broad-leaved gilia), Polemoniaceae
- Allenrolfea occidentalis (iodine bush), Chenopodiaceae
- Allionia incarnata (windmills), Nyctaginaceae
- Alnus rhombifolia (white alder), Betulaceae
- Amaranthus fimbriatus (fringed amaranth), Amaranthaceae
- Ambrosia acanthicarpa (western sand-bur, annual bur-sage), Asteraceae
- Ambrosia dumosa (white bur-sage, burrobush), Asteraceae
- Ambrosia salsola (cheesebush, winged ragweed), Asteraceae
- Amsinckia tessellata (devil's lettuce, checker fiddleneck), Boraginaceae
- Amsonia tomentosa, Apocynaceae
- Anemopsis californica (yerba mansa), Saururaceae
- Anisocoma acaulis (scalebud), Asteraceae
- Arabis dispar (See Boechera dispar)
- Arabis pulchra var. gracilis (See Boechera pulchra)
- Argemone corymbosa (prickly poppy), Papaveraceae
- Arctostaphylos glauca (Ericaceae), big berry manzanita
- Argemone munita (chicalote), Papaveraceae
- Arida arizonica (Silver Lakes daisy), Asteraceae
- Artemisia douglasiana (Douglas' mugwort), Asteraceae
- Artemisia dracunculus (tarragon, wormwood), Asteraceae
- Artemisia ludoviciana (western mugwort), Asteraceae
- Artemisia tridentata (big sagebrush, Great Basin sagebrush), Asteraceae
- Asclepias albicans, (wax milkweed), Apocynaceae
- Asclepias erosa (desert milkweed), Apocynaceae
- Asclepias fascicularis (narrow-leaf milkweed, Mexican whorled milkweed), Apocynaceae
- Aster subulatus (name changed to Symphyotrichum subulatum)
- Astragalus coccineus (scarlet milkvetch, scarlet locoweed), Fabaceae, perennial herb, red, "astragalos" = "ankle bone" for the shape of the seed, "coccineus" = "scarlet"
- Astragalus douglasii (Douglas' milkvetch), Fabaceae
- Astragalus jaegerianus (Lane Mountain milkvetch), Fabaceae
- Astragalus layneae (Layne milkvetch), Fabaceae
- Astragalus lentiginosus (Freckled milkvetch), Fabaceae
- Astragalus newberryi var. newberryi (Newberry milkvetch), Fabaceae
- Atrichoseris platyphylla (gravel ghost, parachute plant), Asteraceae
- Atriplex canescens (four-winged saltbrush), Chenopodiaceae, "canescens" = "covered with short white hairs"
- Atriplex confertifolia (shadscale), Chenopodiaceae
- Atriplex covillei (arrow-scale, Coville's orach), Chenopodiaceae
- Atriplex elegans (wheel-scale, Mecca orach), Chenopodiaceae
- Atriplex hymenelytra (desert holly), Chenopodiaceae
- Atriplex polycarpa (all-scale, cattle spinach), Chenopodiaceae
- Atriplex serenana (bractscale), Chenopodiaceae
- Atriplex spinifera (spiny saltbrush), Chenopodiaceae

=== B ===
- Baccharis salicifolia (mule fat), Asteraceae
- Baccharis salicina (Emory baccharis), Asteraceae
- Baccharis sergiloides (Squaw waterweed, desert baccharis), Asteraceae
- Baileya multiradiata (desert marigold), Asteraceae)
- Baileya pauciradiata (lax-flower, Colorado desert marigold), Asteraceae
- Baileya pleniradiata (wooly marigold), Asteraceae
- Bebbia juncea var. aspera (sweetbush), Asteraceae
- Boechera dispar (, Brassicaceae
- Boechera pulchra (beautiful rock-cress, Prince's rock cress), Brassicaceae
- Boerhavia triquetra (spiderling), Nyctaginaceae
- Bouteloua aristidoides (needle gramma), Poaceae
- Bouteloua barbata (six-week gramma), Poaceae
- Brandegea bigelovii (brandegea), Cucurbitaceae
- Brassica tournefortii (Sahara mustard), Brassicaceae
- Brickellia californica (brickellia), Asteraceae
- Brickellia desertorum (desert brickelbush), Asteraceae
- Brickellia incana (wooly brickellia), Asteraceae
- Brickellia longifolia (long-leaved brickellia), Asteraceae
- Brickellia oblongifolia var. linifolia (pinyon brickellia), Asteraceae
- Bromus madritensis (red brome, foxtail chess), Poaceae
- Buddleja utahensis (Panamint butterfly bush), Scrophulariaceae

=== C ===
- Calochortus kennedyi var. kennedyi (Mariposa lily), Liliaceae
- Calochortus striatus (alkali Mariposa lily), Liliaceae
- Calycoseris parryi (yellow tack-stem), Asteraceae
- Calycoseris wrightii (white tack-stem), Asteraceae
- Calyptridium monandrum (sand-cress), Montiaceae
- Camissonia campestris (Mojave sun cup, field primrose), Onagraceae
- Camissoniopsis pallida subsp. hallii (pale primrose), Hall's suncup Onagraceae
- Camissoniopsis pallida ssp. pallida (pale suncup), Onagraceae
- Canbya candida (pygmy poppy), Papaveraceae
- Castela emoryi (crucifixion thorn), Simaroubaceae
- Castilleja chromosa (desert paintbrush), Orobanchaceae
- Castilleja exserta ssp. venusta (purple owl's clover), Orobanchaceae
- Castilleja plagiotoma (Mojave paintbrush), Orobanchaceae
- Caulanthus inflatus (desert candle), Brassicaceae
- Centrostegia thurberi (red triangles), Polygonaceae
- Chaenactis fremontii (Fremont pincushion, desert pincushion), Asteraceae
- Chaenactis macrantha (Mojave pincushion), Asteraceae
- Chaenactis stevioides (Steve's pincushion), Asteraceae
- Chamomilla suaveolens (common pineapple weed), Asteraceae
- Chamaesyce albomarginata (renamed to Euphorbia albomarginata)
- Chamaesyce setiloba (renamed to Euphorbia setiloba)
- Chrysothamnus nauseosus (See Ericameria nauseosa var. mohavensis
- Chrysothamnus paniculatus (See Ericameria paniculata
- Cheilanthes covillei (Coville's lip fern), Pteridaceae, Greek "cheilos" ="lip", "anthos" = "flower" for lip-like membrane (indusium) covering spore-bearing parts, "coillei" for botanist Frederick Vernon Coville
- Chenopodium californicum (pigweed), Chenopodiaceae
- Chilopsis linearis (desert willow), Bignoniaceae
- Chorizanthe brevicornu var. brevicornu (brittle spineflower), Polygonaceae, "chorizo" = "divided", "anthos" = "flower" (divided calyx in the flower), "brevi" = "short", "cornu" = "horn"
- Chorizanthe rigida (spiny-herb), Polygonaceae, "chorizo" = "divided", "anthos" = "flower" (divided calyx in the flower), rigida = stiff or rigid leaves
- Chylismia brevipes (golden evening primrose), Onagraceae
- Chylismia claviformis (brown-eyed primrose), Onagraceae
- Cirsium mohavense (Mojave thistle), Asteraceae
- Cirsium neomexicanum (desert thistle, Asteraceae
- Cirsium occidentale (western thistle), Asteraceae
- Cleomella obtusifolia (Mojave stinkweed), Cleomaceae
- Coleogyne ramosissima (blackbrush), Rosaceae
- Collinsia bartsiifolia var. davidsonii (Chinese houses), Plantaginaceae
- Cordylanthus eremicus (desert bird's-beak), Asteraceae
- Coreopsis bigelovii (See Leptosyne bigelovii
- Coryphantha chlorantha (fringe-flowered cactus), Cactaceae, Greek "koryphe" = "apex", "anthos" = "flower"
- Coryphantha alversonii (foxtail cactus), Cactaceae
- Coryphantha vivipara (viviparous foxtail cactus), Cactaceae
- Croton californicus (California croton), Euphorbiaceae
- Cryptantha circumscissa (forget-me-not), Boraginaceae
- Cryptantha angustifolia (forget-me-not), Boraginaceae
- Cryptantha intermedia (forget-me-not), Boraginaceae
- Cryptantha maritima (forget-me-not), Boraginaceae
- Cryptantha micrantha (forget-me-not), Boraginaceae
- Cryptantha nevadensis (forget-me-not), Boraginaceae
- Cryptantha pterocarva (forget-me-not), Boraginaceae
- Cryptantha spp. (forget-me-not), Boraginaceae
- Cucurbita palmata (coyote melon), Cucurbitaceae
- Cuscuta denticulata (small-toothed dodder), Convolvulaceae
- Cylindropuntia acanthocarpa var. coloradensis (buckhorn cholla, staghorn cholla), Cactaceae
- Cylindropuntia echinocarpa (silver cholla), Cactaceae
- Cylindropuntia ramosissima (pencil cholla), Cactaceae
- Cymopterus deserticola (desert cymopterus), Apiaceae
- Cymopterus terebinthinus, (turpentine cymopterus), Apiaceae
- Cynanchum utahense (synonym of Funastrum utahense)

=== D ===
- Dalea mollissima (silk dalea), Fabaceae
- Dasyochloa pulchella (desert fluff-grass), Poaceae
- Datura wrightii (jimson weed, thorn-apple, sacred datura), Solanaceae
- Dedeckera eurekensis (July gold), Polygonaceae
- Deinandra arida (Red Rock tarplant), Asteraceae
- Delphinium parishii (desert larkspur), Ranunculaceae
- Dipterostemon capitatus ssp. pauciflorus (desert hyacinth), Themidaceae
- Dicoria canescens (bugseed), Asteraceae, "canescens" = "covered with short white hairs"
- Dieteria canescens (hoary aster), Asteraceae, "canescens" = "covered with short white hairs"
- Distichlis spicata (saltgrass), Poaceae
- Dithyrea californica (spectacle-pod), Brassicaceae
- Dudleya saxosa ssp. aliodes (desert live-forever), Crassulaceae
- Dudleya saxosa ssp. saxosa (Panamint dudleya), Crassulaceae

=== E ===
- Echinocactus polycephalus (cotton-top), synonym of Homalocephala polycephala, Cactaceae
- Echinocereus engelmannii (hedge-hog cactus, calico cactus), Cactaceae
- Echinocereus mojavensis (Mojave mound cactus), Cactaceae
- Encelia actoni (Acton encelia), Asteraceae
- Encelia farinosa (brittlebush, incienso), Asteraceae
- Encelia frutescens (rayless encelia, green brittlebush), Asteraceae
- Encelia virginensis (Virgin River brittlebrush), Asteraceae
- Enceliopsis covillei (Panamint daisy), Asteraceae
- Enceliopsis nudicaulis var. nudicaulis (Naked-stemmed daisy), Asteraceae
- Ephedra californica (California ephedra), Ephedraceae
- Ephedra nevadensis (Nevada ephedra, Mormon tea, Nevada joint-fir), Ephedraceae
- Ephedra funerea (Death Valley ephedra), Ephedraceae
- Ephedra trifurca (long-leaved ephedra), Ephedraceae
- Ephedra viridis (green ephedra, mountain ephedra), Ephedraceae
- Equisetum laevigatum (Braun's hoursetail), Equisetaceae
- Eremalche exilis (white mallow), Malvaceae
- Eremalche rotundifolia (desert five-spot), Malvaceae
- Eremothera boothii subsp. condensata (), Onagraceae
- Eremothera boothii subsp. desertorum (Booth's primrose), Onagraceae
- Eremothera refracta (narrow-leaved primrose, narrow-leaved suncup), Onagraceae, "eremia" = "desert", "refracta" = "broken"
- Eriastrum densifolium (perennial eriastrum), Polemoniaceae
- Ericameria cooperi (Cooper's goldenbush), Asteraceae
- Ericameria cuneata var. spathulata (cliff goldenbush), Asteraceae
- Ericameria laricifolia (turpentine bush), Asteraceae
- Ericameria linearifolia (interior goldenbush, linear-leaved goldenbush, stenotopsis), Asteraceae
- Ericameria nauseosa var. mohavensis (rubber rabbitbrush), Asteraceae
- Ericameria paniculata (black-banded rabbitbrush), Asteraceae
- Erigeron concinnus (hairy daisy), Asteraceae
- Erigeron foliosus (fleabane daisy), Asteraceae
- Eriodictyon angustifolium (narrowleaf yerba santa), Boraginaceae
- Eriodictyon trichocalyx var. trichocalyx (yerba santa), Boraginaceae
- Eriogonum deflexum (flat-topped buckwheat, skeleton weed), Polygonaceae
- Eriogonum fasciculatum var. polifolium (Mojave Desert California buckwheat), Polygonaceae
- Eriogonum inflatum (desert trumpet), Polygonaceae
- Eriogonum plumatella (Yucca buckwheat, flat-topped buckwheat), Polygonaceae
- Eriogonum palmerianum (Palmer buckwheat), Polygonaceae
- Eriophyllum mohavense (Barstow wooly sunflower, woolly sunflower), Asteraceae
- Eriophyllum pringlei (Pringle's wooly daisy), Asteraceae
- Eriophyllum wallacei (Wallace's wooly daisy), Asteraceae
- Erodium cicutarium (red-stemmed filaree, cranesbill), Geraniaceae
- Erodium texanum (desert heron's bill), Geraniaceae
- Eschscholzia androuxii (Joshua Tree poppy), Papaveraceae
- Eschscholzia californica (California poppy), Papaveraceae
- Eschscholzia glyptosperma (desert gold-poppy), Papaveraceae
- Eschscholzia minutiflora (pygmy poppy), Papaveraceae
- Eschscholzia papastillii (cryptic desert poppy), Papaveraceae
- Eucnide urens (rock nettle, sting-bush), Loasaceae
- Euphorbia albomarginata (rattlesnake weed, white-margin sandmat), Euphorbiaceae
- Euphorbia schizoloba (Mojave spurge), Euphorbiaceae
- Euphorbia setiloba (Yuma spurge, bristle-lobed sandmat), Euphorbiaceae
- Euthamia occidentalis (western flat-topped goldenrod), Asteraceae

=== F ===
- Fagonia laevis (California fagonbush), Zygophyllaceae
- Fallugia paradoxa (Apache plume), Rosaceae
- Ferocactus cylindraceus (California barrel cactus, visnaga, bisnaga), Cactaceae
- Festuca octoflora (six-weeks fescue), Poaceae
- Funastrum cynanchoides (climbing milkweed), Apocynaceae
- Funastrum hirtellum (rambling milkweed), Apocynaceae

=== G ===
- Geraea canescens (desert sunflower), Asteraceae, "canescens" = "covered with short white hairs"
- Gilia latiflora (broad-flowered gilia), Polemoniaceae
- Gilmania luteola (golden carpet), Polygonaceae
- Glycyrrhiza lepidota (wild licorice), Fabaceae
- Glyptopleura setulosa (carveseed, keysia), Asteraceae
- Gnaphalium palustre (western marsh cudweed), Asteraceae
- Grusonia parishii (club cholla, mat cholla, horse crippler, dead cactus), Cactaceae, yellow flowers
- Grayia spinosa (hop-sage), Chenopodiaceae
- Gutierrezia microcephala (sticky snakeweed, matchweed), Asteraceae

=== H ===
- Hecastocleis shockleyi (hecastocleis), Asteraceae
- Heliotropium curassavicum (heliotrope), Boraginaceae
- Hesperocallis undulata) (desert lily), Agavaceae, "hesperos" = "western", "undulate" = "wavy margined (leaves)"
- Hesperoyucca whipplei) (our lord's candle), Agavaceae
- Hibiscus denudatus (pale face, rock hibiscus), Malvaceae
- Hilaria rigida (big galleta), Poaceae
- Holmgrenanthe petrophila (rock lady), Plantaginaceae
- Hulsea vestita ssp. parryi (Parry's sunflower), Asteraceae
- Hyptis emoryi (desert lavender), Fabaceae
- Hymenoclea salsola (See Ambrosia salsola)

=== I ===
- Isocoma acradenia (alkali goldenbush), Asteraceae

=== J ===
- Juniperus californica (California juniper), Cupressaceae
- Juniperus osteosperma (Utah juniper), Cupressaceae

=== K ===
- Keckiella antirrhinoides var. microphylla (snapdragon penstemon, yellow keckiella), Plantaginaceae
- Keckiella rothrockii (Rothrock's keckiella), Plantaginaceae
- Krameria erecta (pima rhatany), Krameriaceae
- Krameria bicolor (white rhatany), Krameriaceae
- Krascheninnikovia lanata (winter fat), Chenopodiaceae

=== L ===
- Lactuca serriola (prickly lettuce), Asteraceae
- Langloisia setosissima subsp. punctata (lilac sunbonnet), Polemoniaceae, "setosissima" = "very hairy bristly"
- Langloisia setosissima subsp. setosissima (bristly langloisia), Polemoniaceae
- Larrea tridentata (creosote bush), Zygophyllaceae
- Lasthenia gracilis (goldfields), Asteraceae
- Layia glandulosa (white tidy-tips), Asteraceae
- Lepidium flavum var. flavum (yellow pepper-grass), Brassicaceae
- Lepidium fremontii (desert alyssum, bush peppergrass), Brassicaceae
- Lepidium lasiocarpum (desert peppergrass), Brassicaceae
- Lepidospartum latisquamum (greenbroom), Asteraceae
- Lepidospartum squamatum (scale-broom), Asteraceae
- Leptosiphon breviculus (Mojave linanthus), Polemoniaceae
- Leptosyne bigelovii (Bigelow's tickseed, Bigelow's coreopsis), Asteraceae
- Linanthus dichotomus (evening snow), Polemoniaceae
- Linanthus maculatus (pygmy pink-spot, spotted gilia, Little San Bernardino Mountains linanthus), Polemoniaceae
- Linanthus parryae (Parry's linanthus, sandblossoms), Polemoniaceae
- Linum lewisii (flax), Linaceae
- Loeseliastrum matthewsii (desert calico), Polemoniaceae
- Loeseliastrum schottii (Schott gilia, little sunbonnets), Polemoniaceae
- Logfia filaginoides (herba impia, cottonrose), Asteraceae
- Lomatium mohavense (desert parsley), Apiaceae
- Lotus argophyllus (name changed to Acmispon argophyllus
- Lotus heermannii (name changed to Acmispon heermannii and then Acmispon tomentosus var. glabriusculus)
- Lotus humistratus (name changed to Acmispon brachycarpus
- Lotus purshianus (name changed to Acmispon americanus
- Lotus rigidus (name changed to
- Lotus scoparius (name changed to Acmispon glaber)
- Lotus strigosus (name changed to Acmispon strigosus<rp|728})
- Lupinus arizonicus (Arizona lupine), Fabaceae
- Lupinus concinnus (bajada lupine, elegant lupine), Fabaceae, "concinnus" = "neatly made" or "elegant"
- Lupinus excubitus (grape soda lupine), Fabaceae
- Lupinus odoratus (royal desert lupine), Fabaceae
- Lupinus shockleyi (desert lupine, Shockley lupine), Fabaceae
- Lycium cooperi (Cooper's box thorn, peach thorn), Solanaceae
- Lycium pallidum (rabbit thorn), Solanaceae

=== M ===
- Malacothrix coulteri (snake's head), Asteraceae
- Malacothrix glabrata (desert dandelion), Asteraceae
- Marah fabaceus (wild cucumber), Cucurbitaceae
- marah macrocarpus (manroot), Cucurbitaceae
- Mammillaria tetrancistra (nipple cactus), Cactaceae
- Marina parryi (Parry dalea, Parry's false prairie-clover), Fabaceae
- Menodora scabra var. glabrescens (rough menodora, broom twinberry), Oleaceae
- Menodora spinescens var. spinescens (spiny menodora), Oleaceae
- Mentzelia albicaulis (white-stemmed stick-leaf), Loasaceae
- Mentzelia involucrata (sand blazing star), Loasaceae
- Mentzelia laevicaulis (blazing star), Loasaceae
- Mimulus bigelovii (Bigelow's monkeyflower), Phrymaceae
- Mimulus mohavensis (Mojave monkeyflower), Phrymaceae
- Mimulus rupicola (Death Valley monkeyflower, rock midget), Phrymaceae
- Mirabilis laevis (wishbone bush), Nyctaginaceae
- Mirabilis multiflora (giant four o'clock), Nyctaginaceae
- Mohavea breviflora (lesser mohavea), Plantaginaceae
- Mohavea confertiflora (ghost-flower), Plantaginaceae
- Mollugo cerviana (carpet-weed), Molluginaceae
- Monardella exilis (Mojave pennyroyal), Lamiaceae
- Monoptilon bellidiforme (small desert star), Asteraceae
- Monoptilon bellioides (desert star), Asteraceae
- Muhlenbergia porteri (Porter's muhly), Poaceae

=== N ===
- Nama demissa (purple mat), Boraginaceae
- Neogaerrhinum filipes (twining snapdragon), Plantaginaceae, "fili" = "threadlike", "pes" = "foot" -> "threadlike stalks
- Nicolletia occidentalis (hole-in-the sand plant), Asteraceae
- Nicotiana obtusifolia (coyote tobacco), Solanaceae
- Nicotiana quadrivalvis (Indian tobacco), Solanaceae
- Nitrophila mohavensis (Amargosa nitrophila), Amaranthaceae
- Nolina bigelovii (Bigelow's nolina), Ruscaceae
- Nolina parryi (Parry's nolina, Parry's beargrass), Ruscaceae

=== O ===
- Oenothera avita (evening primrose), Onagraceae
- Oenothera primiveris subsp. bufonis (yellow evening primrose, spring evening primrose), Onagraceae
- Oligomeris linifolia (linear-leaved cambess), Resedaceae
- Opuntia basilaris (beavertail cactus), Cactaceae
- Opuntia chlorotica (pancake-pear), Cactaceae
- Opuntia polyacantha var. erinacea (Mojave prickly-pear, old man cactus), Cactaceae
- Orobanche cooperi (Cooper's broomrape), Orobanchaceae
- Oxytheca perfoliata (punctured bract), Polygonaceae

=== P ===
- Palafoxia arida (desert needles), Asteraceae
- Pectis papposa (cinch-weed), Asteraceae
- Pectocarya penicillata (hairy-leaved comb-bur, northern pectocarya), Boraginaceae
- Pectocarya setosa (stiff-stemmed comb-bur, round-nut pectocarya, popcorn flower), Boraginaceae
- Pediomelum castoreum (beaver dam breadroot), Fabaceae
- Pellaea mucronata (bird's foot fern), Pteridaceae
- Penstemon albomarginatus (white-margined beardtoungue), Plantaginaceae
- Penstemon calcareus (limestone beardtongue), Plantaginaceae
- Penstemon fruticiformis var. fruticiformis (Panamint penstemon), Plantaginaceae
- Penstemon palmeri var. palmeri (Palmer's penstemon), Plantaginaceae
- Penstemon pseudospectabilis (Mojave beardtongue), Plantaginaceae
- Penstemon thompsoniae (Thompson's beardtongue), Plantaginaceae
- Penstemon utahensis (Utah firecracker, Utah penstemon), Plantaginaceae
- Peritoma arborea (bladderpod), Cleomaceae
- Perityle emoryi (Emory rock daisy), Asteraceae
- Petalonyx nitidus (canyon petalonyx, smooth sandpaper plant), Loasaceaelis
- Petalonyx thurberi ssp. gilmanii (Death Valley sandpaper plant), Loasaceae
- Petalonyx thurberi ssp. thurberi (sandpaper plant), Loasaceae
- Peucephyllum schottii (pygmy cedar), Asteraceae
- Phacelia campanularia (desert Canterbury bell), Boraginaceae
- Phacelia crenulata (notch-leaved phacelia), Boraginaceae
- Phacelia curvipes (Washoe phacelia), Boraginaceae
- Phacelia distans (lace-leaf phacelia), Boraginaceae
- Phacelia fremontii (Fremont's phacelia), Boraginaceae
- Phacelia ivesiana (Ives phacelia), Boraginaceae
- Phacelia neglecta (alkali phacelia), Boraginaceae
- Phacelia pachyphylla (thick-leaved phacelia), Boraginaceae
- Phacelia parishii (Parish's phacelia), Boraginaceae
- Phacelia pedicellata (Specter phacelia), Boraginaceae
- Phacelia rotundifolia (round-leaved phacelia), Boraginaceae
- Phacelia vallis-mortae (Death Valley phacelia), Boraginaceae
- Pholisma arenarium (scaly-stemmed sand plant), Boraginaceae
- Phoradendron californicum (desert mistletoe), Viscaceae
- Phoradendron villosum (oak mistletoe), Viscaceae
- Phragmites australis (common reed), Poaceae
- Physalis crassifolia (thick-leaved ground-cherry), Solanaceae
- Physaria tenella (beadpod, bladderpod), Brassicaceae
- Pinus edulis (Colorado pinyon), Pinaceae
- Pinus flexilis (limber pine), Pinaceae
- Pinus longaeva (bristlecone pine), Pinaceae
- Pinus monophylla (singleleaf pinyon pine), Pinaceae
- Pinus sabiniana (gray pine, ghost pine, foothill pine), Pinaceae
- Plagiobothrys parishii (Parish's popcorn flower), Boraginaceae
- Plantago ovata var. fastigiata (desert plantain)
- Pluchea sericea (arrowweed), Asteraceae
- Populus fremontii (Fremont cottonwood), Salicaceae
- Porophyllum gracile (pore-leaf, odora, hierba del venado), Asteraceae
- Portulaca halimoides (desert portulaca, silk-cotton purslane), Portulacaceae
- Prosopis glandulosa ver. torreyana (honey mesquite), Fabaceae
- Prosopis pubescens (screw bean, tornillo), Fabaceae
- Prunus eremophila (Mojave Desert plum), Rosaceae
- Prunus fasciculata (desert almond), Rosaceae
- Psathyrotes annua (mealy rosette, annual turtleback), Asteraceae
- Psathyrotes ramosissima (turtleback, velvet rosette), Asteraceae
- Psilostrophe cooperi (paper daisy), Asteraceae
- Psorothamnus arborescens (indigo bush), Fabaceae
- Purshia tridentata (bitterbrush, antelope bush), Rosaceae

=== R ===
- Rafinesquia neomexicana (desert chicory), Asteraceae
- Rorippa nasturtium-aquaticum (yellow cress, water cress), Brassicaceae
- Rhus aromatica (skunkbrush), Anacardiaceae
- Robinia neomexicana (New Mexico locust), Fabaceae
- Rumex hymenosepalus (canaigre, wild rhubarb), Polygonaceae

=== S ===
- Salix exigua (sand-bar willow, narrow-leaved willow), Salicaceae, "salix" Latin for willow
- Salix laevigata (red willow), Salicaceae, "laevis" = "smooth or unhairy"
- Salix lasiolepis (arroyo willow), Salicaceae, "lasio" = "wooly"
- Salsola tragus (tumbleweed, Russian thistle), Chenopodiaceae, "salsola" = "salty"
- Salvia carduacea (thistle sage), Lamiaceae
- Salvia columbariae (chia), Lamiaceae
- Salvia dorii (desert sage, gray ball sage), Lamiaceae
- Salvia funerea (Death Valley sage), Lamiaceae
- Salvia mohavensis (Mojave sage), Lamiaceae
- Sarcobatus vermiculatus (greasewood), Chenopodiaceae; Greek "sarx" = "flesh", "batos" = "bramble"
- Sarcostemma cynanchoides (renamed to Funastrum cyanchoides)
- Sclerocactus polyancistrus (pineapple cactus, devil claw), Cactaceae, Greek "skleros" = "hard"
- Scopulophila rixfordii (Rixford rockwort), Caryophyllaceae
- Scutellaria mexicana (bladder sage, paper-bag bush), Lamiaceae
- Senecio flaccidus var. monoesis (groundsel, California butterweed), Asteraceae
- Senecio mohavensis (Mojave butterweed), Asteraceae
- Senegalia greggii (catclaw, wait-a-minute bush), Fabaceae
- Senna armata (desert senna, spiny senna), Fabaceae
- Sesuvium verrucosum (western sea purslane), Aizoaceae, "verrucosum" = "warty" referring to mipple-like projections visible with a hand lens
- Sphaeralcea ambigua (apricot mallow, desert mallow)
- Stanleya elata) (Panamint plume, tall prince's plume]]), Brassicaceae
- Stanleya pinnata) (prince's plume), Brassicaceae
- Stephanomeria exigua (annual mitral), Asteraceae
- Stephanomeria parryi (Parry's stephanomeria, Parry rock-pink), Asteraceae
- Stephanomeria pauciflora var. pauciflora (wire lettuce, perennial wire lettuce desert straw), Asteraceae
- Stephanomeria virgata var. pleurocarpa (tall stephanomeria), Asteraceae
- Stillingia linearifolia (linear-leaved stillingia), Euphorbiacae
- Stillingia paucidentata (tooth-leaf), Euphorbiaceae
- Stillingia spinulosa (annual stillingia), Euphorbiaceae
- Stipa hymenoides (Indian ricegrass), Poaceae
- Stipa speciosa (desert needle grass), Poaceae
- Suaeda nigra (bush seepweed, ink-blite), Chenopodiaceae
- Swallenia alexandrae (Eureka Valley dunes grass), Poaceae
- Symphyotrichum subulatum (annual saltmarsh aster), Asteraceae
- Syntrichopappus fremontii (false woolly daisy), Asteraceae
- Sysymbrium spp. (London rocket), Brassicaceae

=== T ===
- Tamarix aphylla (Athel tree), Tamaricaceae
- Tamarix ramosissima (salt cedar, tamarisk), Tamaricaceae
- Tauschia parishii (Parish's umbrellawort). Apiaceae
- Tetradymia axillaris var. longispina (cotton-thorn), Asteraceae, "tetra" = "four", "dymos" = "together" (first described genus member had 4 flowers per head), "aris" = "of the" -> "axillaris" = "of the (leaf) axil"
- Tetrapteron palmeri (tetrapteron, Palmer primrose), Onagracae
- Thamnosma montana (turpentine broom), Rutaceae
- Thelypodium integrifolium ssp. affine (alkali crucifer), Brassicaceae
- Thymophylla pentachaeta (thymophylla), Asteraceae
  - Thysanocarpus curvipes (fringe-pod), Brassicaceae
- Tidestromia lanuginosa (wooly tidestromia), Amaranthaceae
- Tidestromia suffruticosa (honey-sweet), Amaranthaceae
- Tiquilia canescens (woody crinklemat), Boraginaceae, "canescens" = "covered with short white hairs"
- Tiquilia nuttallii (Nuttall's crinklemat, Nuttall Sandmat, Nuttall's Coldenia), Boraginaceae
- Tiquilia plicata, (tiquilia), Boraginaceae
- Toxicoscordion brevibracteatum (death camas, desert zygadene), Melanthiaceae
- Tragia ramosa (noseburn), Euphorbiaceae, "ramosa" = "branched"
- Tribulus terrestris (puncture vine, goathead), Zygophyllaceae
- Trichoptilium incisum (yellow-heads), Asteraceae
- Tripterocalyx micranthus (small-flowered abronia), Nyctaginaceae
- Trixis californica var. californica (trixis), Asteraceae

=== U ===
- Uropapus lindleyi (silverpuffs), Asteraceae

=== V ===
- Verbena gooddingii (Gooding's verbena, southwestern verbena), Verbenaceae
- Viguiera parishii (Parish's goldeneye), Asteraceae

=== X ===
- Xanthisma gracile (annual bristleweed), Asteraceae
- Xylorhiza tortifolia var. tortifolia (Mojave aster), Asteraceae

=== Y ===
- Yucca baccata var. baccata (banana yucca, fleshy-fruited yucca, Spanish bayonet), Agavaceae
- Yucca brevifolia) (Joshua tree), Agavaceae)
- Yucca schidigera (Mojave yucca), Agavaceae

== List by plant family and genus ==
=== A ===
- Agavaceae (century plant family), Greek "agauos" = "admirable (appearance)"

- Agave, (century plant)), Greek "agauos" = "admirable (appearance)"

Agave deserti var. simplex (simple desert agave), "simplex" = "simple, undivided, or unbranched"
- Agave utahensis var. eborispina, (ivory spined agave), "utahensis" = "Utah", Latin "eboris" = "ivory" and "spina" = "thorn" -> (white marginal spines and terminal spine turning white with age)
- Agave utahensis var. nevadensis (Clark Mountain agave), "utahensis" = "Utah", "nevadensis" = "Nevada"

- Hesperocallis (Desert lily) (desert lily)), Greek "hesperos" = "of the evening, western", "kallos" = "beautiful"

- Hesperocallis undulata), "undulate" = "wavy (margins)"

- Hesperoyucca (chaparral yucca, Quixote plant, our lord's candle), Greek "hesperos" = "of the evening, western", misnamed "yucca" from the Caribbean name for the unrelated manihot or cassava

- Hesperoyucca whipplei), "whipplei" in honor of Pacific Railroad Survey surveyor Amiel Weeks Whipple

- Yucca (Spanish bayonet, yucca), misnamed "yucca" from the Caribbean name for the unrelated manihot or cassava

- Yucca baccata (banana yucca), blue yucca), Latin "bacca" = "small round fruit"
- Yucca brevifolia ((Joshua tree), "brevi" = "short", "folia" = "Leaf"
- Yucca schidigera (Mojave yucca), Latin "schidigera" = "having wood splinters" (leaf blade margins peeling off splinters)

- Aizoaceae (fig-marigold family, ice plant family)

- Sesuvium (sea-purslane)

- Sesuvium verrucosum (western sea-purslane)

- Trianthema (horse-purslane)

- Trianhema portulacastrum

- Amaranthaceae, amaranth family
  Amaranthus (amaranth, pigweed}

- Amaranthus blitoides (procumbent pigweed
- Amaranthus fimbriatus (fringed amaranth)
- Amaranthus palmeri
- Amaranthus torreyi

- Nitrophila

- Nitrophila mohavensis (Amargosa nitrophila)
- Nitrophila occidentalis

- Tidestromia

- Tidestromia lanuginosa (wooly tidestromia)
- Tidestromia suffruticosa var. oblongifolia

- Anacardiaceae (sumac family, cashew family)

- Rhus

- Rhus aromatica (skunk bush)

- Toxicodendron (poison oak, poison ivy)

- Toxicodendron diversilobum (western poison oak)

- Apiaceae, carrot family

- Bowlesia

- Bowlesia incana

- Cymopterus

- Cymopterus aboriginum
- Cymopterus deserticola (desert cympopterus)
- Cymopterus gilmanii (Gilman's cymopterus)
- Cymopterus panamintensis var. acutifolius
- Cymopterus panamintensis var. panamintensis
- Cymopterus ripleyi (Ripley's cymopterus)

- Daucus)

- Daucus pusillus)

- Lomatium)

- Lomatium foeniculaceum subsp. fimbriatum
- Lomatium mohavense
- Lomatium nevadense var. nevadense
- Lomatium nevadense var. parishii
- Lomatium parryi
- Lomatium utriculatum

- Oenanthe

- Oenanthe sarmentosa

- Vesper

- Vesper multinervatus, syn. Cymopterus multinervatus (purple-nerve cymopterus)

- Yabea

- Yabea microcarpa

- Apocynaceae, dogbane family

- Amsonia
- Amsonia tomentosa

- Asclepias (milkweed)

- Asclepias albicans (white-stemmed milkweed)
- Asclepias eriocarpa (Kotolo)
- Asclepias erosa (Desert milkweed)
- Asclepias fascicularis (narrow-leaf milkweed)
- Asclepias nyctaginifolia (Mojave milkweed)
- Asclepias subulata (rush milkweed)

- Funastrum

- Funastrum cynanchoides)
- Funastrum hirtellum (trailing townula)
- Funastrum utahense (Utah vine))

- Matelea

- Matelea parvifolia (spearleaf)

- Araliaceae (ginseng family))
  Hydrocotyle (marsh pennywort
  Hydrocotyle ranunculoides
  Hydrocotyle umbellata
  Hydrocotyle verticillata
- Asteraceae (Compositae), (sunflower family)

- Acamptopappus (goldenhead)

- Acamptopappus shockleyi (Shockley's goldenhead))
- Acamptopappus sphaerocephalus var. hirtellus)
- Acamptopappus sphaerocephalus var. sphaerocephalus)

- Achillea (yarrow)

- Achillea millefolium

- Adenophyllum)

- Adenophyllum cooperi
- Adenophyllum porophylloides

- Ageratina (snakeroot)

- Ageratina herbacea

- Almutaster (marsh alkali aster)

- Almutaster pauciflorus

- Amauriopsis (yellow ragleaf))

- Amauriopsis dissecta

- Ambrosia (ragweed, bur-sage, burrobrush)

- Ambrosia acanthicarpa (annual bur-sage)
- Ambrosia confertiflora
- Ambrosia dumosa (white bur-sage)
- Ambrosia eriocentra (wooly bur-sage)
- Ambrosia salsola var. pentalepis
- Ambrosia salsola var. salsola

- Amphipappus (chaff-bush)

- Amphipappus fremontii var. fremontii)
- Amphipappus fremontii var. spinosus)

- Ancistrocarphus (groundstar, wooly fishhooks)

- Ancistrocarphus filagineus

- Anisocoma (scalebud)

- Anisocoma acaulis

- Arida

- Arida arizonica (Silver Lake daisy)
- Arida carnosa

- Artemisia (mugwort, sagebrush, sagewort)

- Artemisia biennis (biennial wormwood), (non-native)
- Artemisia bigelovii (Bigelow sagebrush)
- Artemisia dracunculus (tarragon)
- Artemisia ludoviciana (silver wormword)
- Artemisia ludoviciana subsp. albula
- Artemisia ludoviciana subsp. incompta
- Artemisia nova (black sagebrush)
- Artemisia spinescens (budsage)
- Artemisia tridentata subsp. parishii
- Artemisia tridentata subsp. tridentata (big sagebrush)

- Atrichoseris (gravel-ghost)

- Atrichoseris platyphylla

- Baccharis

- Baccharis brachyphylla
- Baccharis salicifolia
- Baccharis salicina
- Baccharis sarothroides
- Baccharis sergiloides

- Bahia

- Bahia neomexicana

- Bahiopsis

- Bahiopsis parishii
- Bahiopsis reticulata

- Baileya (desert marigold)

- Baileya multiradiata
- Baileya pauciradiata
- Baileya reticulate

- Bebbia (sweetbush)

- Bebbia juncea

- Bidens

- Bidens frondosa (sticktight)
- Bidens laevis (bur-marigold

- Brickellia (brickellbush)

- Brickellia atractyloides var. arguta (pungent brickelbush)
- Brickellia atractyloides var. atractyloides (spearleaf brickelbush)
- Brickellia atractyloides var. odontolepis
- Brickellia desertorum
- Brickellia incana
- Brickellia longifolia var. longifolia
- Brickellia longifolia var. multiflora
  - Brickellia microphylla var. scabra
- Brickellia nevinii
- Brickellia oblongifolia var. linifolia

- Calycoseris (tack-stem

- Calycoseris parryi
- Calycoseris wrightii

- Cardus

- Cardus acanthoides (blessed thistle) (non-native)
- Centauria melitensis (tocolate) (non-native)
- Centauria solstitialis (yellow star-thistle) (non-native)

- Carthamus (distaff thistle)

- Carthamus creticus (smooth distaff thistle) (non-native)

- Centauria (knapweed, star-thistle)

- Centauria benedicta
- Chaenactis fremontii
- Cirsium mohavense
- Deinandra arida
- Dicoria canescens
- Dieteria canescens
- Encelia actoni
- Encelia farinosa
- Encelia frutescens
- Enceliopsis nudicaulis
- Ericameria cooperi
- Ericameria cuneata
- Ericameria linearifolia
- Ericameria nauseosa
- Ericameria paniculata
- Erigeron concinnus
- Eriophyllum mohavense
- Eriophyllum pringlei
- Eriophyllum wallacei
- Geraea canescens
- Glyptopleura setulosa
- Gutierrezia microcephala
- Hecastocleis shockleyi
- Isocoma acradenia
- Lasthenia gracilis
- Layia glandulosa
- Lepidospartum latisquamum
- Lepidospartum squamatum
- Leptosyne bigelovii
- Logfia filaginoides
- Malacothrix coulteri
- Malacothrix glabrata
- Monoptilon bellidiforme
- Monoptilon bellioides
- Nicolletia occidentalis
- Palafoxia arida
- Pectis papposa
- Perityle emoryi
- Peucephyllum schottii
- Porophyllum gracile
- Psthyrotes annua
- Psathyrotes ramosissima
- Psilostrophe cooperi
- Rafinesquia neomexicana
- Senecio flaccidus
- Senecio mohavensis
- Stephanomeria parryi
- Stephanomeria pauciflora
- Syntrocopappus fremontii
- Tetradymia axillaria
- Tetradymia canescens
- Tetradymia spinosa
- Tetradymia stenolepis
- Thymophylla pentachaeta
- Trichoptilium incisum
- Trixis californica var. californica
- Xanthisma gracile
- Xylorhiza tortifolia

=== B ===
- Bignoniaceae (bignonia family)

- Chilopsis linearis

- Boraginaceae (borage family)

- Amsinckia tessellata
- Cryptantha spp.
- Eriodictyon trichocalyx
- Heliotropium curassavicum
- Nama demissa
- Pectocarya penicillata
- Pectocarya setosa
- Phacelia campanularia
- Phacelia crenulata
- Phacelia curvipes
- Phacelia distans
- Phacelia fremontii
- Phacelia pachyphylla
- Phacelia parishii
- Phacelia pedicellata
- Phacelia rotundifolia
- Phacelia vallis-mortae
- Pholisma arenarium
- Plagiobothrys parishii
- Tiquilia plicata

- Brassicaceae (mustard family)

- Boechera pulchra
- Brassica tournefortii
- Caulanthus inflatus
- Dithyrea californica
- Lepidium flavum
- Lepidium fremontii
- Physaria tenella
- Stanleya elata
- Stanleya pinnata
- Thelypodium integrifolium

=== C ===
- Cactaceae (cactus family)

- Coryphantha chlorantha
- Cylindropuntia acanthocarpa
- Cylindropuntia echinocarpa
- Echinocereus engelmannii
- Echinocereus mojavensis
- Ferocactus cylindraceus
- Grusonia parishii
- Homalocephala polycephala, syn. Echinocactus polycephalus
- Mammillaria tetrancistra
- Opunita basilaris
- Opuntia chlorotica
- Opuntia polyacantha
- Sclerocactus polyancistrus

- Caryophyllaceae

- Achyronychia cooperi

- Chenopodiaceae

- Allenrolfea occidentalis
- Atriplex canescens
- Atriplex confertifolia
- Atriplex covellei
- Atriplex elegans
- Atriplex hymenelytra
- Atriplex polycarpa
- Atriplex serenana
- Atriplex spinifera
- Grayia spinosa
- Krascheninnikovia lanata
- Salsola tragus
- Sarcobatus vermiculatus
- Suaeda nigra

- Cleomaceae

- Cleomella obtusifolia
- Peritoma arborea

- Crassulaceae

- Dudleya saxosa

- Cupressaceae

- Juniperus californica
- Juniperus osteosperma

=== E ===
- Ephedraceae

- Ephedra nevadensis
- Ephedra trifurca
- Ephedra viridis

- Euphorbiaceae

- Euphorbia albomarginata
- Euphorbia setiloba
- Croton californicus
- Euphorbia schizoloba
- Stillengia linearifolia
- Stillingia spinulosa
- Tragia ramosa

=== F ===
- Fabaceae

- Acmispon rigidus
- Acmispon strigosus
- Astragalus coccinus
- Astragalus jaegerianus
- Astragalus layneae
- Astragalus lentigunosus
- Astragalus newberryi
- Dalea mollissima
- Glycorrhiza lepidota
- Lupinus arizonicus
- Lupinus concinnus
- Lupinus excubitus
- Lupinus odorata
- Lupius shockleyi
- Marina parryi
- Pediomelum castoreum
- Prosopis glandulosus
- Prosopis pubescens
- Psorothamnus arborescens
- Senegalia greggii
- Senna armata

=== G ===
- Geraniaceae

- Erodium

- Erodium cicutarium
- Erodium texanum

=== Z ===
- Zygophyllaceae (caltrop family)

== List by common names ==
- California barrel cactus (Ferocactus cylindraceus)
- Banana yucca (Yucca baccata)
- Beavertail prickly pear (Opuntia basilaris)
- California fan palm (Washingtonia filifera)
- Creosote bush
- Mojave suncup (Camissonia campestris)
- Newberry's milkvetch (Astragalus newberryi)
- Cooper's dyssodia (or dogweed) (Adenophyllum cooperi)
- Death Valley monkeyflower (Mimulus rupicola)
- Desert candle (Caulanthus inflatus)
- Desert five-spot
- Desert larkspur
- Desert Lily
- Desert rock pea
- Desert star
- Erigeron concinnus
- Ipomopsis arizonica
- Joshua Tree
- Jumping Cholla
- Larrea tridentata
- Linanthus demissus
- Lupinus arizonicus
- Mesquite
- Mojave prickly poppy
- Mojave sage
- Mojave yucca
- Mormon Tea
- Branched Pencil Cholla
- Phacelia calthifolia
- Phacelia crenulata
- Pinus monophylla
- Ocotillo
- Prairie clover
- Latimer's woodland gilia (Saltugilia latimeri)
- Senna covesii
- Teddy-bear Cholla
- Utah Juniper
- Western poison oak
- White woolly daisy
- Wide-bannered lupine
