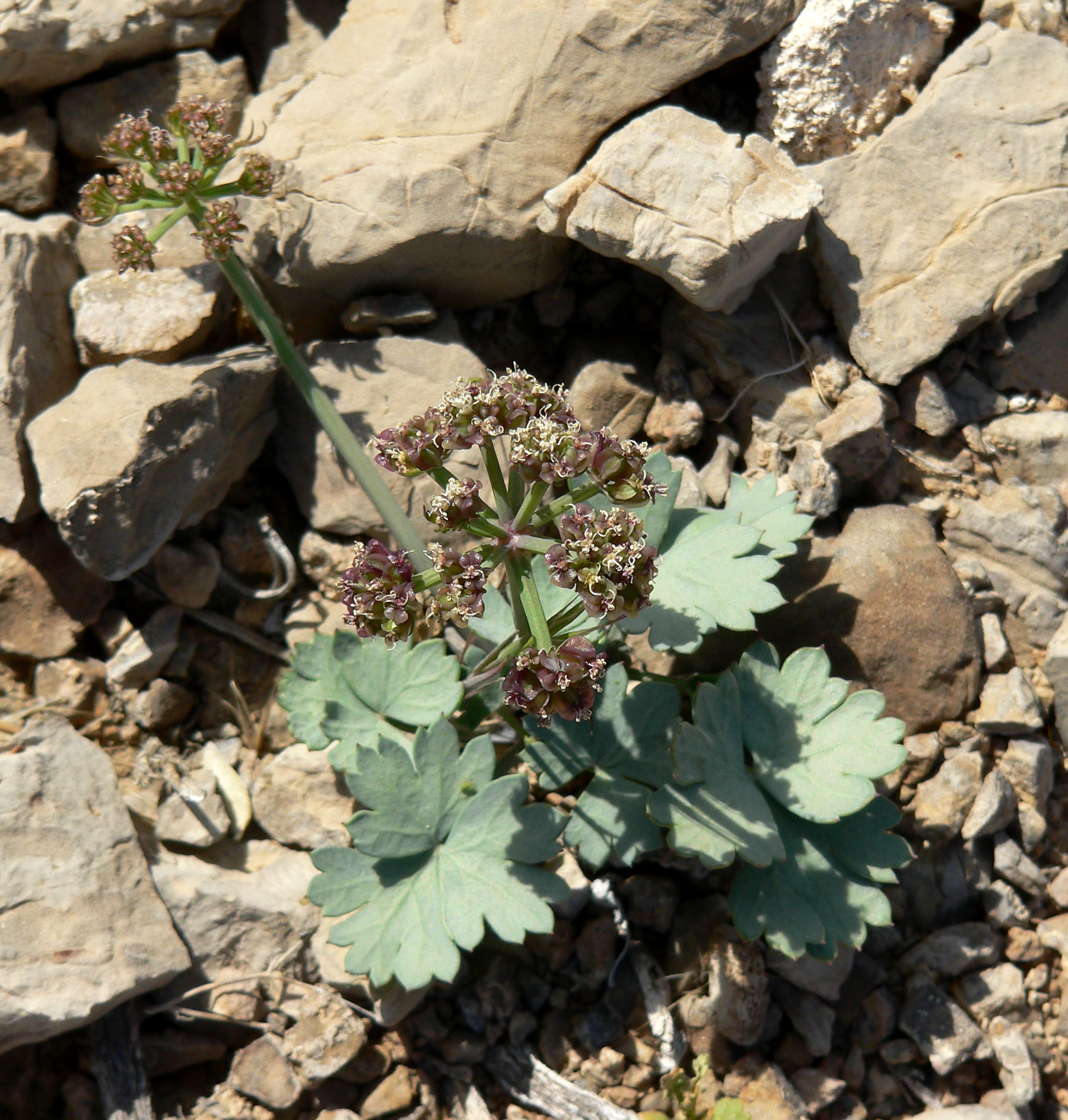

Conservation status
- Vulnerable (NatureServe)

Scientific classification
- Kingdom: Plantae
- Clade: Tracheophytes
- Clade: Angiosperms
- Clade: Eudicots
- Clade: Asterids
- Order: Apiales
- Family: Apiaceae
- Genus: Cymopterus
- Species: C. gilmanii

Binomial name
- Cymopterus gilmanii Morton

= Cymopterus gilmanii =

Species of flowering plant

Cymopterus gilmanii is a species of flowering plant in the carrot family known by the common name Gilman's springparsley.

This plant is native to the US states of California and Nevada, where it is an uncommon inhabitant of the scrublands on the limestone and gypsum slopes of the Mojave Desert mountains.

== Description ==
Cymopterus gilmanii has a short, fibrous stem from which it bears flat, thick, blue-green parsley-shaped leaves, each leaflet subdivided into pointed triangular segments.

The inflorescence is a spread umbel atop a tall peduncle, with white and purple flowers at the ends of pedicels.
