= Silverpuffs =

Silverpuffs is a common name for several plants and may refer to:

- Uropappus lindleyi
- Microseris species

== See also ==
- Silverpuff, Chaptalia texana
