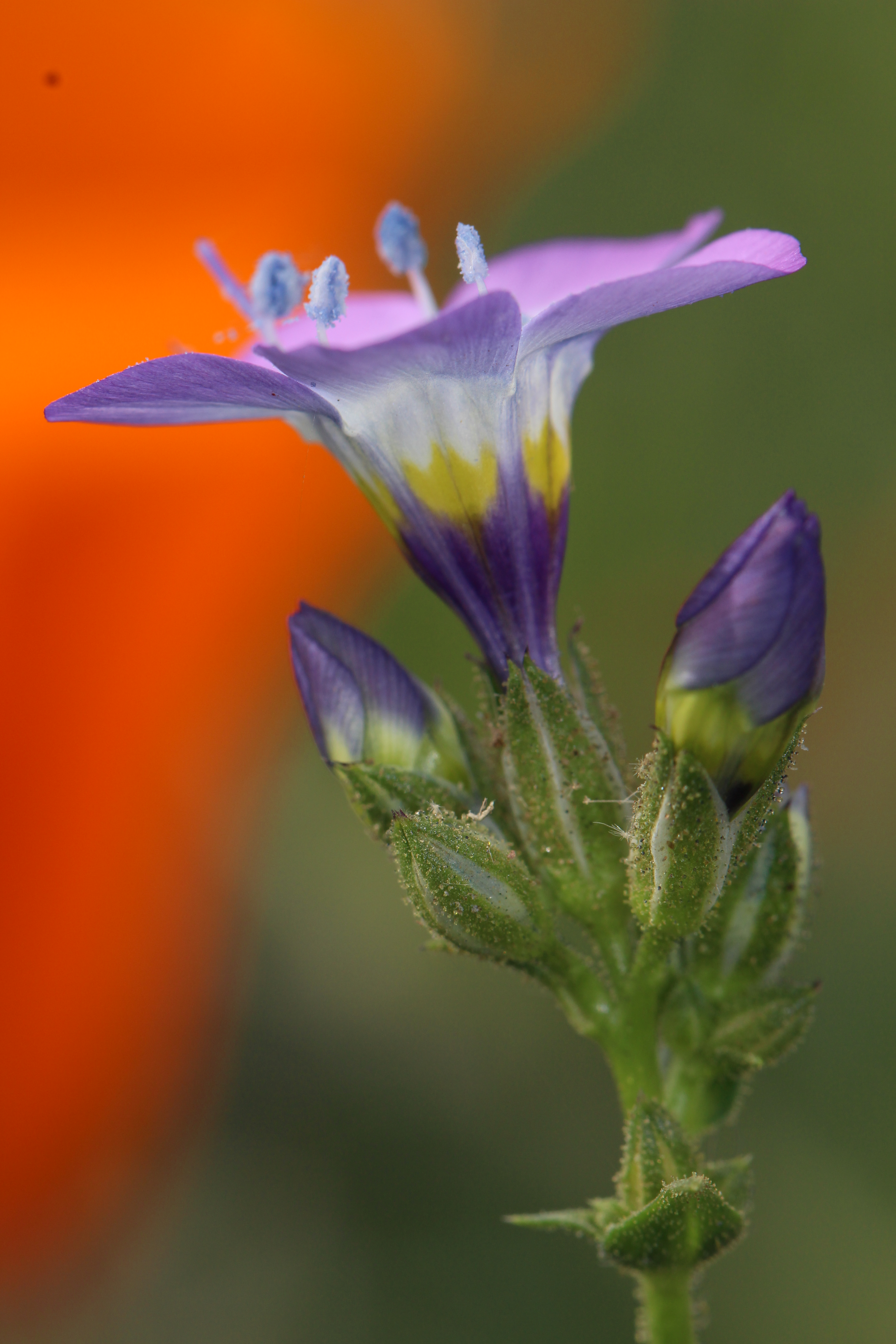

Scientific classification
- Kingdom: Plantae
- Clade: Embryophytes
- Clade: Tracheophytes
- Clade: Spermatophytes
- Clade: Angiosperms
- Clade: Eudicots
- Clade: Asterids
- Order: Ericales
- Family: Polemoniaceae
- Genus: Gilia
- Species: G. latiflora

Binomial name
- Gilia latiflora A.Gray

= Gilia latiflora =

Species of flowering plant

Gilia latiflora is a species of flowering plant in the phlox family known by the common names hollyleaf gilia and broad-flowered gilia. It is endemic to deserts and mountains of southern California and the adjacent margin of Nevada.

== Description ==
Gilia latiflora is lavender-colored. The plant starts from a basal rosette of frilly leaves, each of which is made up of many narrow-toothed lobes. The stem is generally too small to notice; instead the plant is scapose, sending stemlike inflorescences directly up from the ground.

Each multibranched inflorescence is green to reddish in color and approaches half a meter in maximum height. The calyx is 2–7 millimetres (0.1–0.3 in) and is more or less glandular. The flowers are fragrant. The corolla is 9–35 millimetres (0.4–1.4 in) across with a purple tube. The upper throat and lobe bases are white grading to lavender at the tips. Protruding from the throat are generally five stamens and one longer style.
