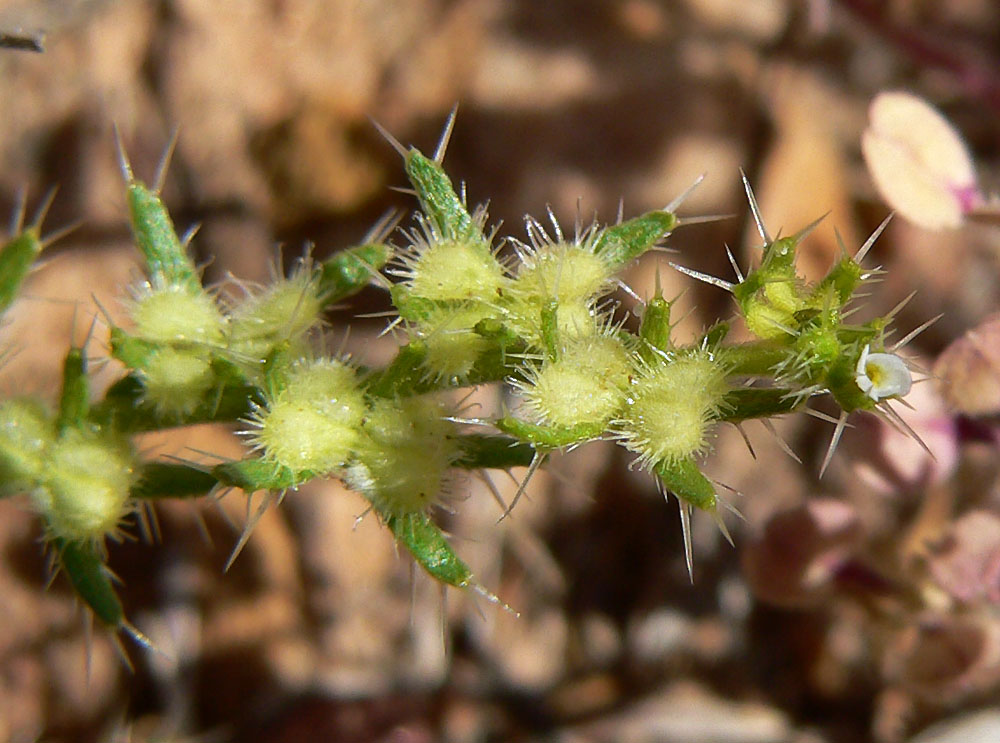

Scientific classification
- Kingdom: Plantae
- Clade: Tracheophytes
- Clade: Angiosperms
- Clade: Eudicots
- Clade: Asterids
- Order: Boraginales
- Family: Boraginaceae
- Genus: Pectocarya
- Species: P. setosa

Binomial name
- Pectocarya setosa A.Gray

= Pectocarya setosa =

Species of flowering plant

Pectocarya setosa, known by the common names moth combseed and round-nut pectocarya, is a species of flowering plant in the borage family.

== Distribution ==
The plant is native to western North America, in Northwestern Mexico in Baja California and Sonora, and the Pacific Northwest and Southwestern United States.

It grows in many types of habitats, including desert scrub, woodland, and grassland. It is found in the Mojave Desert, Great Basin, and Sonoran Desert.

== Description ==
Pectocarya setosa is an annual herb producing a slender, rough-haired stem, generally upright to erect in form to a maximum height of about 23 centimeters. The small, pointed linear leaves alternately arranged along the upper stem, and oppositely along the lower part.

The inflorescence is a series of flowers, each on a curved pedicel. The flower has small green sepals, which are lined with hairs and long bristles. The fruits are rounded or oval nutlets with membranous wings along the sides.
