= Skeletonweed =

Skeletonweed is a common name for many species of plants, including:

- Chaetadelpha wheeleri, an asterid
- Chondrilla juncea, an asterid
- Eriogonum deflexum, a buckwheat
- Pleiacanthus spinosus, an asterid
- Shinnersoseris spp. of the asterids
