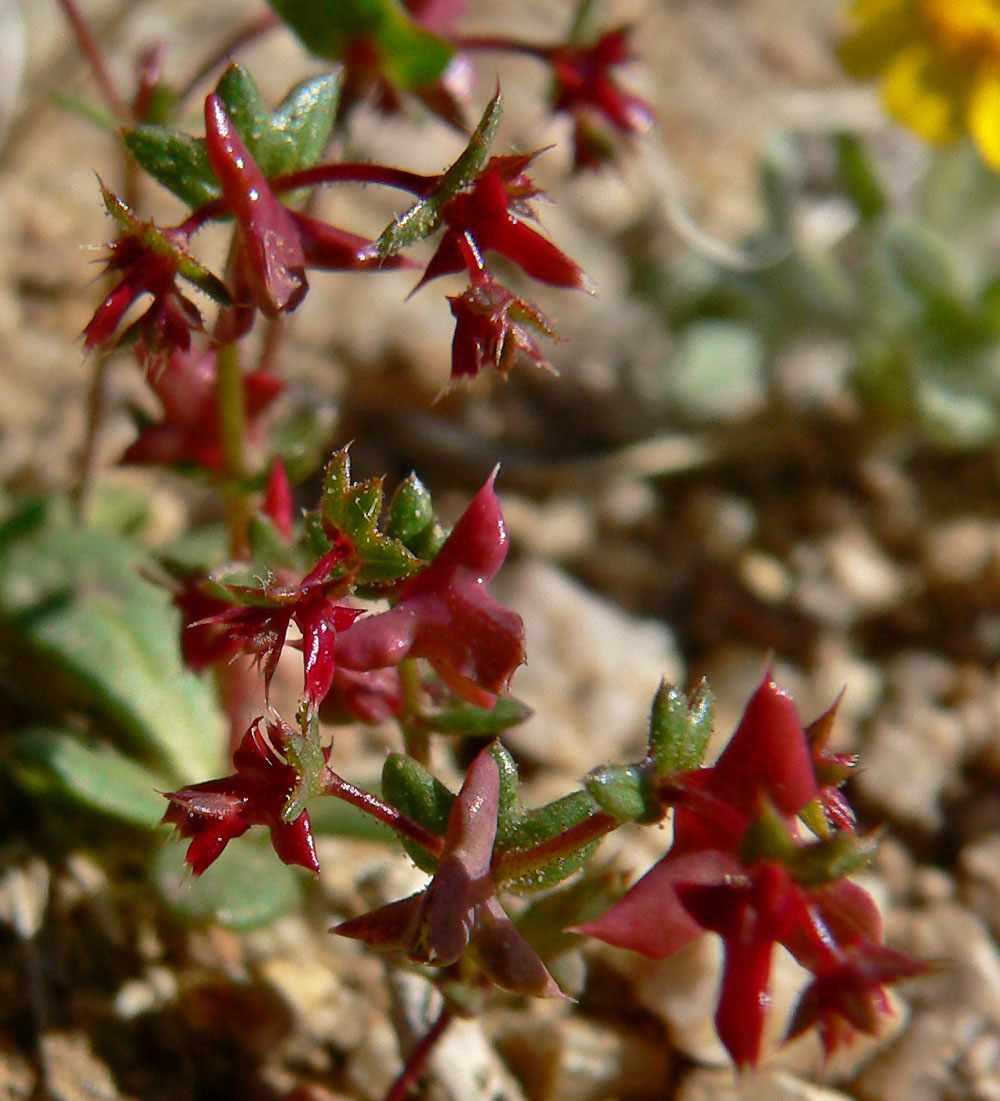
- Centrostegia thurberi

Scientific classification
- Kingdom: Plantae
- Clade: Tracheophytes
- Clade: Angiosperms
- Clade: Eudicots
- Order: Caryophyllales
- Family: Polygonaceae
- Subfamily: Eriogonoideae
- Genus: Centrostegia; A.Gray
- Species: C. thurberi

Binomial name
- Centrostegia thurberi A.Gray ex Benth.

Synonyms
- Centrostegia cryptantha (Curran) Goodd.; Centrostegia thurberi var. macrotheca (J.T.Howell) Goodman; Chorizanthe thurberi (A.Gray ex Benth.) S.Watson; Chorizanthe thurberi var. cryptantha Curran; Chorizanthe thurberi var. macrotheca J.T.Howell

= Centrostegia =

Genus of flowering plants

Centrostegia is a monotypic genus of plants in the family Polygonaceae. Its sole species is Centrostegia thurberi, known by the common names Thurber's spineflower and red triangles. It is a petite herb with a distinct red coloration native to the southwestern United States and northwestern Mexico.
