= Desert lupine =

Desert lupine is a common name for several plants and may refer to:

- Lupinus aridus
- Lupinus sparsiflorus
