= Cymopterus ripleyi =

Conservation status
- Vulnerable (NatureServe)

Scientific classification
- Kingdom: Plantae
- Clade: Tracheophytes
- Clade: Angiosperms
- Clade: Eudicots
- Clade: Asterids
- Order: Apiales
- Family: Apiaceae
- Genus: Cymopterus
- Species: C. ripleyi

Binomial name
- Cymopterus ripleyi Barneby

Species of flowering plant

Cymopterus ripleyi is a species of flowering plant in the carrot family known by the common name Ripley's springparsley, or Ripley's cymopterus. It is native to Nevada, Arizona and eastern California, where it grows in habitat with sandy soils, such as deserts. It is a stemless perennial herb, producing leaves and inflorescence from the taproot. The shiny, hairless leaves have small, rounded blades with approximately three leaflets each divided into lobes. The leaves are borne on petioles up to 10 centimeters long. The inflorescence is a spherical cluster of purplish or off-white flowers atop a long peduncle.
