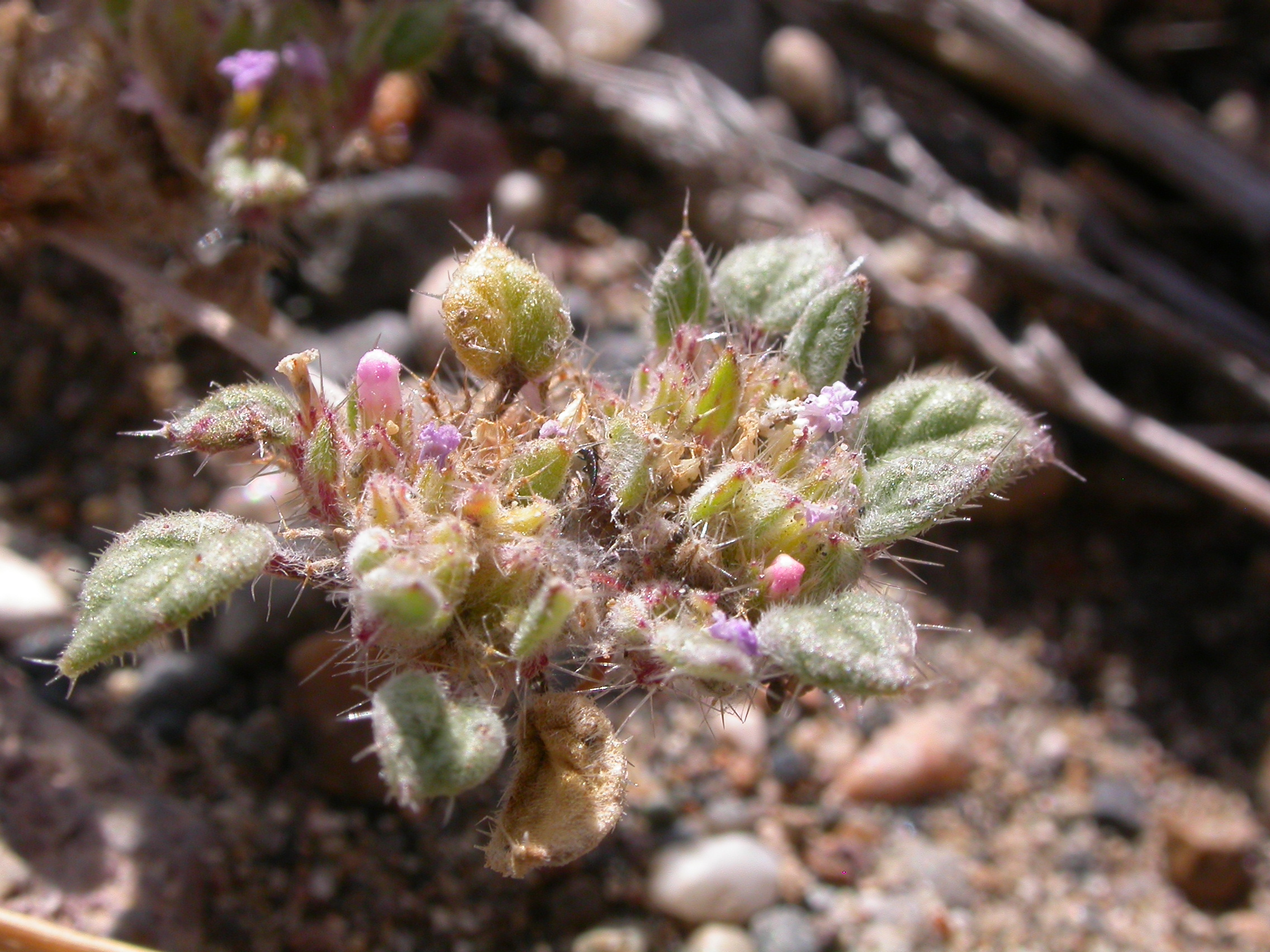
- Tiquilia nuttallii

Conservation status
- Secure (NatureServe)

Scientific classification
- Kingdom: Plantae
- Clade: Tracheophytes
- Clade: Angiosperms
- Clade: Eudicots
- Clade: Asterids
- Order: Boraginales
- Family: Ehretiaceae
- Genus: Tiquilia
- Species: T. nuttallii

Binomial name
- Tiquilia nuttallii (Hook.) A.T. Richardson

Synonyms
- Coldenia nuttallii

= Tiquilia nuttallii =

Species of plant

Tiquilia nuttallii (Nuttall's crinklemat, annual tiquilia, Nuttall sandmat, Nuttall's coldenia) is an annual, subshrub-like plant of middle and higher elevation deserts in the family Ehretiaceae. It is found in western North America from central Washington to western Colorado, and northern California and northern Arizona; it is also found in a disjunct population in Missouri.

It is a short, low-growing plant, seldom over 4 to 12 inches tall. Flowers are five- lobed. Leaves are small with ridges, hence the name crinklemat.
