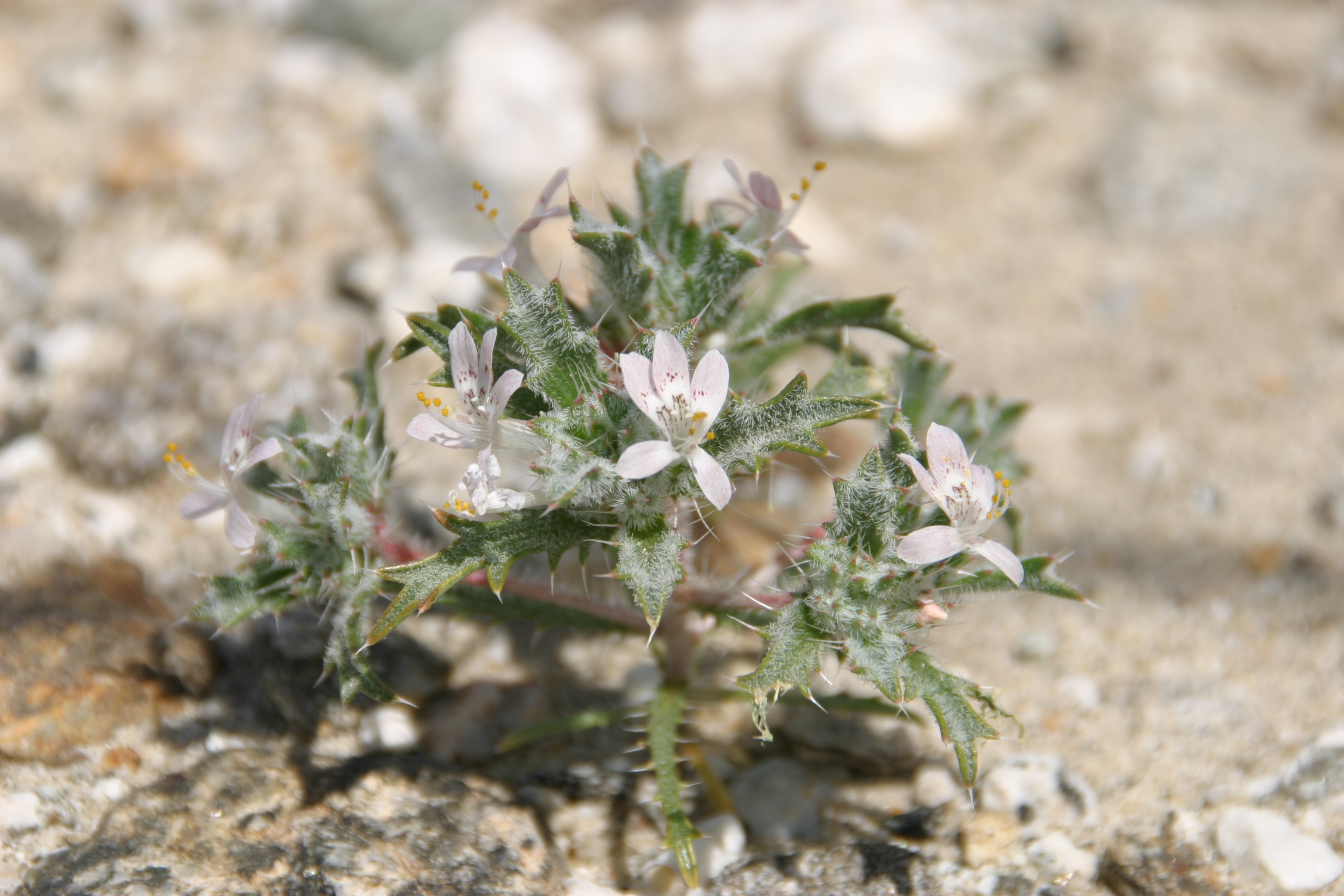

Scientific classification
- Kingdom: Plantae
- Clade: Tracheophytes
- Clade: Angiosperms
- Clade: Eudicots
- Clade: Asterids
- Order: Ericales
- Family: Polemoniaceae
- Genus: Loeseliastrum
- Species: L. schottii

Binomial name
- Loeseliastrum schottii (Torr.) Timbrook

= Loeseliastrum schottii =

Species of flowering plant

Loeseliastrum schottii is a species of flowering plant in the phlox family known by the common name Schott's calico. It is native to the southwestern United States and northern Mexico, where it is common in many parts of the desert region. It is a small, hairy annual herb with alternately arranged leaves each up to 4 centimeters long and edged with long bristle-tipped teeth. The flower generally has three lobes on its upper lip and two on its lower. It is spotted to mottled in pattern, varying in color from purple-speckled white to orange-speckled yellow, sometimes with reds and pinks. The protruding stamens are curved and tipped with yellow anthers.
