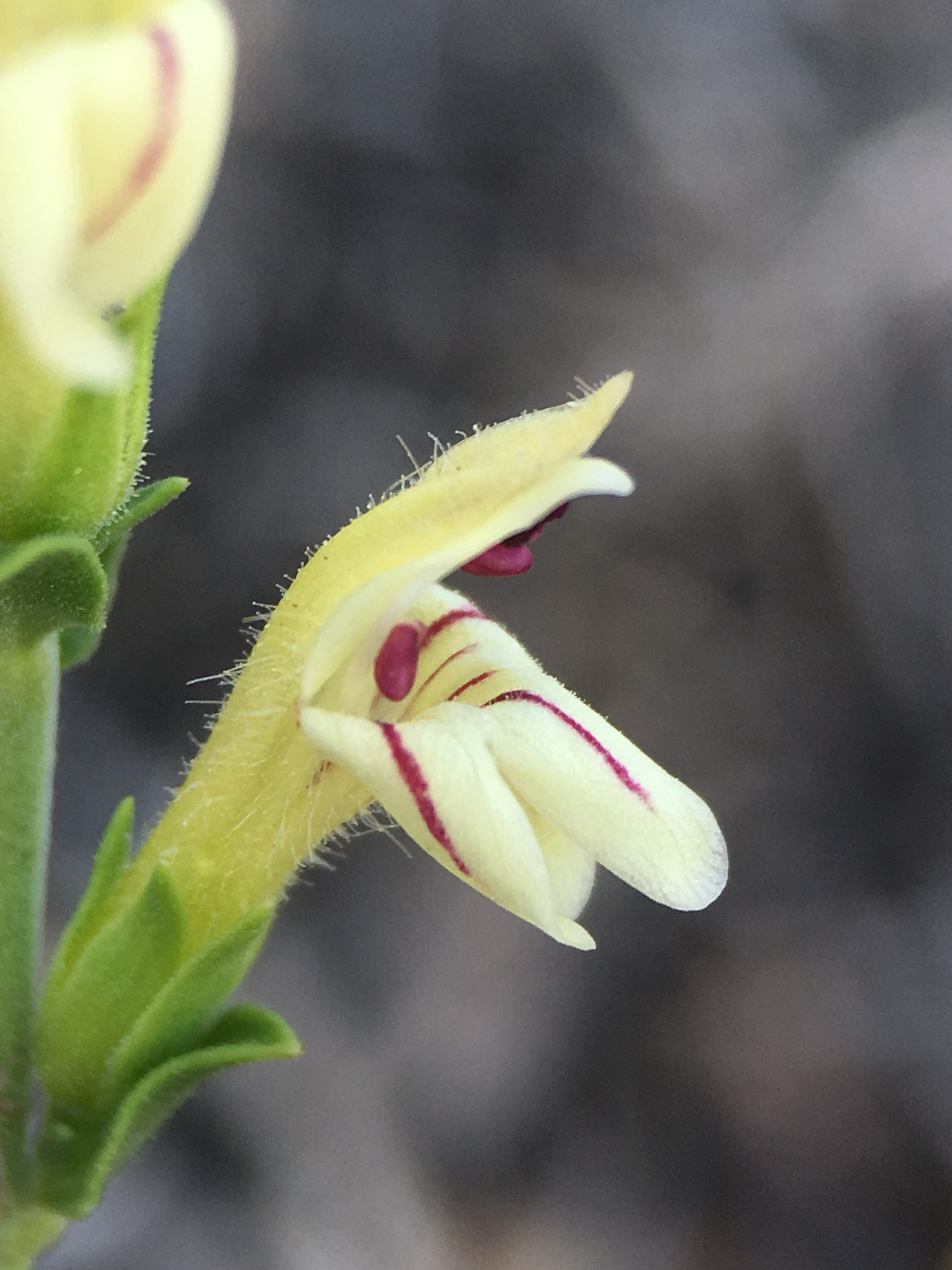

Scientific classification
- Kingdom: Plantae
- Clade: Tracheophytes
- Clade: Angiosperms
- Clade: Eudicots
- Clade: Asterids
- Order: Lamiales
- Family: Plantaginaceae
- Genus: Keckiella
- Species: K. rothrockii

Binomial name
- Keckiella rothrockii (Gray) Straw

= Keckiella rothrockii =

Species of flowering plant

Keckiella rothrockii is a species of flowering plant in the plantain family known by the common name Rothrock's keckiella. It is native to the desert mountains of southeastern California and adjacent Nevada, where it lives in sagebrush and woodland. This is a short, wide shrub reaching maximum heights near half a meter. The hairy green stems bear small oval-shaped leaves up to 1.5 centimeters long. The flowers vary in color from brownish to yellow to cream, and are sometimes striped with dull purple or brown. Each is up to about 2 centimeters long with curling lobes at the mouth. Inside the tubular flower are stamens, including a flat, sterile stamen known as a staminode.
