= Pygmy poppy =

Pygmy poppy is a common name for the following plant species:

- Plants in genus Canbya, especially:
  - Canbya candida, with white flowers
- Eschscholzia minutiflora, with yellow flowers
