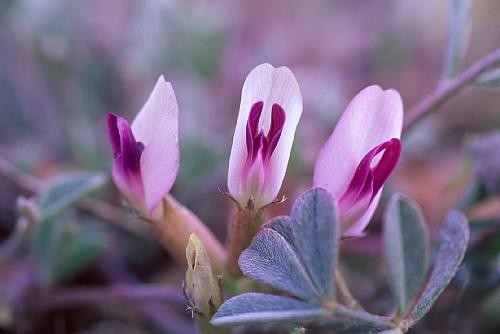
- Astragalus newberryi var. castoreus

Conservation status
- Secure (NatureServe)

Scientific classification
- Kingdom: Plantae
- Clade: Tracheophytes
- Clade: Angiosperms
- Clade: Eudicots
- Clade: Rosids
- Order: Fabales
- Family: Fabaceae
- Subfamily: Faboideae
- Genus: Astragalus
- Species: A. newberryi

Binomial name
- Astragalus newberryi A.Gray

Varieties
- Astragalus newberryi var. aquarii Isely; Astragalus newberryi var. blyae (Rose) Barneby; Astragalus newberryi var. castoreus M.E.Jones; Astragalus newberryi var. escalantinus Barneby; Astragalus newberryi var. newberryi

= Astragalus newberryi =

Species of flowering plant in the pea family

Astragalus newberryi (Newberry's milkvetch), is a flowering plant in the family Fabaceae, native to the western United States from Idaho to New Mexico and California. A variety is found in the Death Valley area and the eastern Mojave Desert in California and Nevada. It grows in rocky and gravelly areas between 1,300–2,350 metres (4,270–7,710 ft) elevation.

== Description ==
It is a perennial herbaceous plant, with pinnate leaves 1.5–15 cm long with 3–15 leaflets, each leaflet 5–20 mm long. The flowers are pink-purple in color; flowering is between April and June. The fruit is a pod 13–28 mm long, containing a single seed.

== General references ==
- Stewart, J. M. (1998) Mojave Desert Wildflowers pg. 139.
