= Manroot =

Manroot is a common name for several plants with very large roots including:

- Ipomoea leptophylla, a species of morning glory
- Ipomoea pandurata, a species of morning glory
- Marah, a genus of gourds native to western North America
