= Elegant lupine =

Elegant lupine is a common name for several plants and may refer to:

- Lupinus concinnus, native to the southwestern United States and northern Mexico
- Lupinus elegans, native to Mexico and Guatemala
