= Bugseed =

Bugseed is a common name for a plant that may refer to:

- Corispermum, Chenopodiaceae
- Dicoria canescens, Asteraceae
