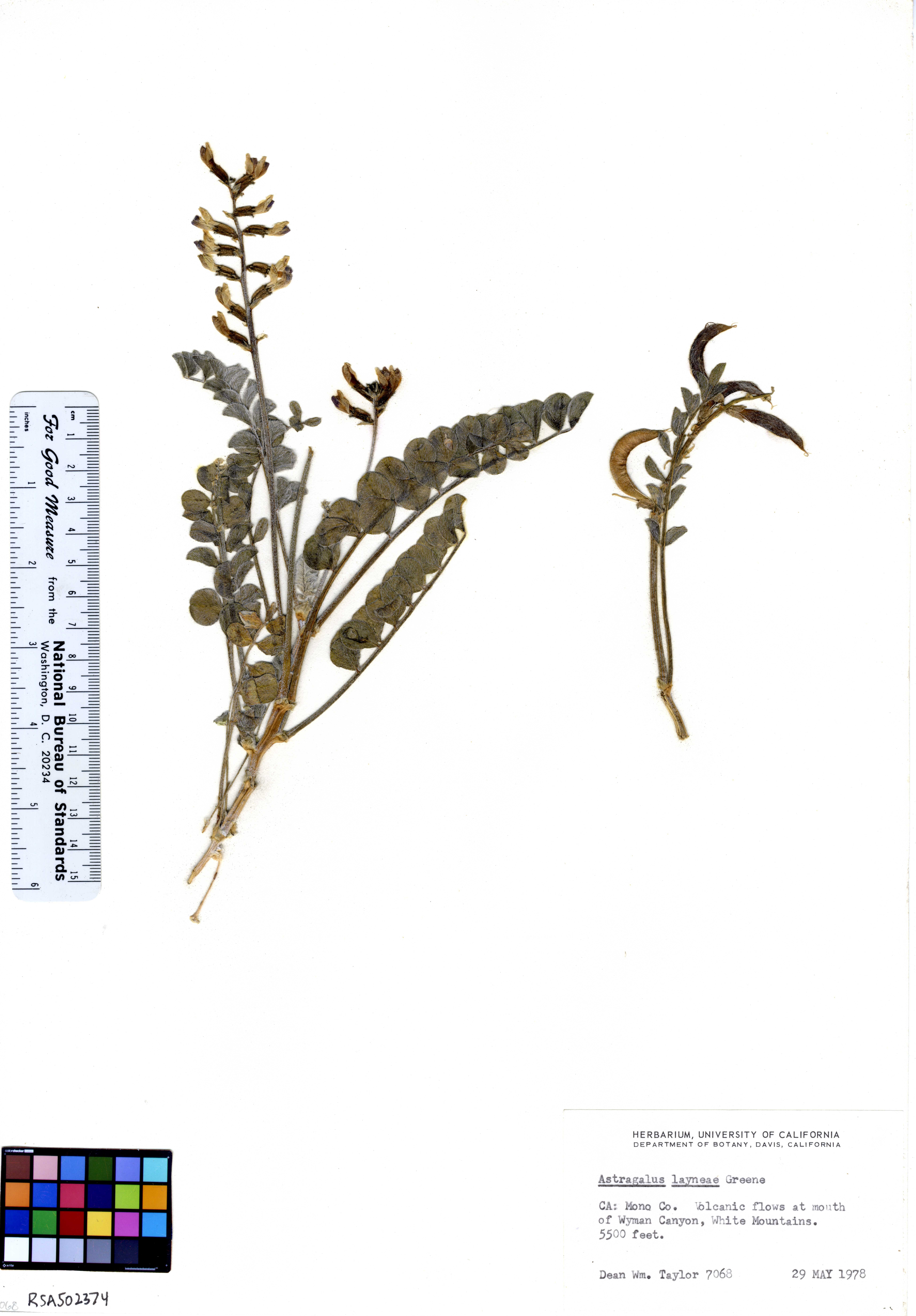
- herbarium specimen

Scientific classification
- Kingdom: Plantae
- Clade: Tracheophytes
- Clade: Angiosperms
- Clade: Eudicots
- Clade: Rosids
- Order: Fabales
- Family: Fabaceae
- Subfamily: Faboideae
- Genus: Astragalus
- Species: A. layneae

Binomial name
- Astragalus layneae Greene

= Astragalus layneae =

Species of legume

Astragalus layneae is a species of milkvetch known by the common name widow's milkvetch. It is native to the Mojave Desert and surrounding mountain ridges in California and Nevada.

== Description ==
This is a small perennial herb growing from a deep rhizome and producing erect stems no taller than about 16 centimeters. The leaves are made up of many oval to rounded leaflets, and stem and leaves are coated in gray-green hairs.

The inflorescence is covered in dark hairs and bears up to 45 flowers. Each flower is between one and two centimeters in length and has white petals tipped and streaked in bright purple. The fruit is a hanging legume pod up to 6.5 centimeters long. It is curved in shape and leathery and hairy in texture.
