= Cymopterus deserticola =

Conservation status
- Imperiled (NatureServe)

Scientific classification
- Kingdom: Plantae
- Clade: Tracheophytes
- Clade: Angiosperms
- Clade: Eudicots
- Clade: Asterids
- Order: Apiales
- Family: Apiaceae
- Genus: Cymopterus
- Species: C. deserticola

Binomial name
- Cymopterus deserticola Gray

Species of flowering plant

Cymopterus deserticola is a species of flowering plant in the carrot family known by the common names desert cymopterus or desert springparsley. This rare species is endemic to California, where it grows in creosote bush scrub and Joshua tree woodland of the Mojave Desert, from east of Victorville to Kramer Junction. It has no stem, instead sending its erect petioles holding the leaves and erect peduncles bearing the flowers straight out of the sand. Each leaf upon the petiole is a dull green and thick and fleshy, divided into several rubbery-looking leaflets which are again divided into triangular pointed lobes. The inflorescence is a spherical umbel of tiny purplish corollas surrounded by large green bracts.
