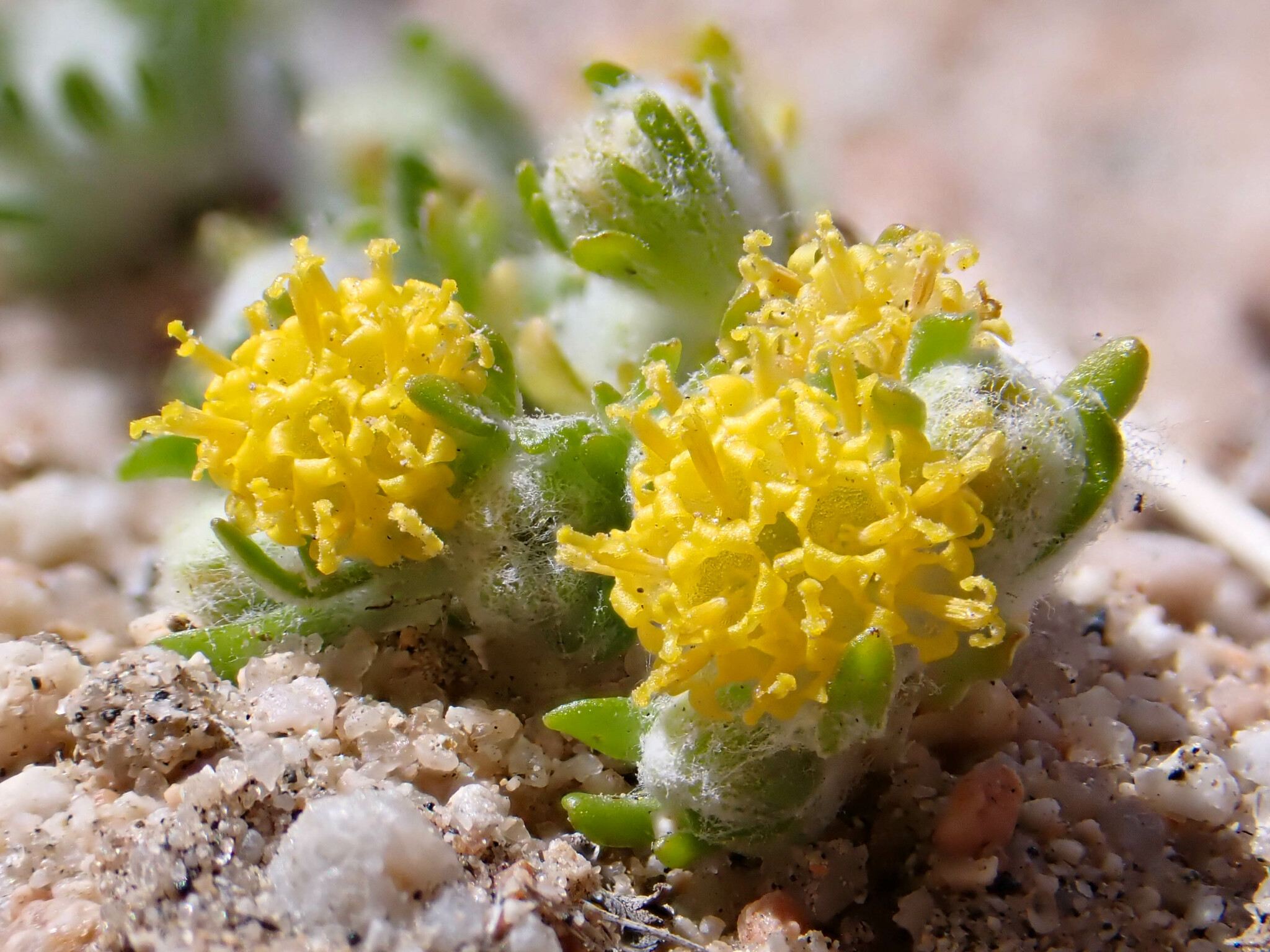

Scientific classification
- Kingdom: Plantae
- Clade: Tracheophytes
- Clade: Angiosperms
- Clade: Eudicots
- Clade: Asterids
- Order: Asterales
- Family: Asteraceae
- Genus: Eriophyllum
- Species: E. pringlei

Binomial name
- Eriophyllum pringlei A.Gray

Synonyms
- Actinolepis pringlei (A.Gray) Greene

= Eriophyllum pringlei =

Species of flowering plant

Eriophyllum pringlei is a North American species of flowering plant in the family Asteraceae known by the common name Pringle's woolly sunflower. It is native to the southwestern United States (Arizona, Nevada, California) and northern Mexico (Baja California), where it grows in several types of desert, canyon, and hillside habitat, such as chaparral and sagebrush.

Eriophyllum pringlei is a petite annual herb no more than about 8 centimeters (3.2 inches) high, growing in woolly tufts. The lobed leaves are up to about a centimeter (0.4 inches) long and coated in white woolly fibers. The inflorescence is a cluster of flower heads filled with 10-20 golden yellow disc florets but no ray florets.
