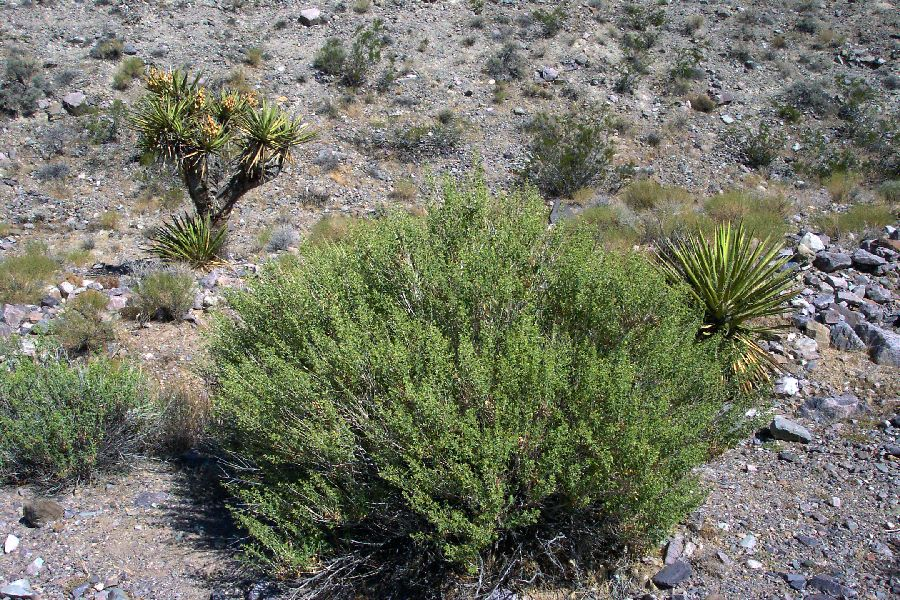

Scientific classification
- Kingdom: Plantae
- Clade: Tracheophytes
- Clade: Angiosperms
- Clade: Eudicots
- Clade: Asterids
- Order: Asterales
- Family: Asteraceae
- Genus: Brickellia
- Species: B. desertorum

Binomial name
- Brickellia desertorum Coville

Synonyms
- Brickellia californica var. desertorum Parish; Coleosanthus desertorum (Cov.) Cov.

= Brickellia desertorum =

Species of flowering plant

Brickellia desertorum is a species of flowering plant in the family Asteraceae known by the common names desert brickellbush and desert brickellia. It is native to Mexico, Central America, the West Indies, and the southwestern United States (the Mojave and Sonoran Deserts of California, Nevada, and Arizona).

Brickellia desertorum is a densely branching shrub with hairy stems growing to 1.5 metres (4.9 ft) tall. The small, toothed, oval-shaped leaves are up to 1.2 centimeters long. The inflorescences at the end of stem branches contain clusters of flower heads, each about a centimeter long and lined with greenish, purplish, or yellowish phyllaries. At the tip of the head are 8 to 12 tubular disc florets.

The fruit is a hairy cylindrical achene 2 or 3 millimeters long with a pappus of bristles.
