= Pediomelum castoreum =

Scientific classification
- Kingdom: Plantae
- Clade: Tracheophytes
- Clade: Angiosperms
- Clade: Eudicots
- Clade: Rosids
- Order: Fabales
- Family: Fabaceae
- Subfamily: Faboideae
- Genus: Pediomelum
- Species: P. castoreum

Binomial name
- Pediomelum castoreum (S.Watson) Rydb.

Synonyms
- Psoralea castorea

Species of legume

Pediomelum castoreum is a species of flowering plant in the legume family known by the common names beaver Indian breadroot and beaver dam breadroot. It is native to the deserts around the intersection of California, Nevada, and Arizona, where it grows in local habitat including disturbed areas. It is a perennial herb with no stem or a short stem that is mostly underground, leaving the plant at ground level. The compound leaves are each made up of five or six oval leaflets which may be over 4 centimeters long. The leaf is borne on a long petiole. The inflorescence is a raceme of several blue or purple pealike flowers each roughly a centimeter long. The fruit is a hairy oval legume pod tipped with a long, curved beak. It contains ridged gray seeds each about 6 millimeters long.
