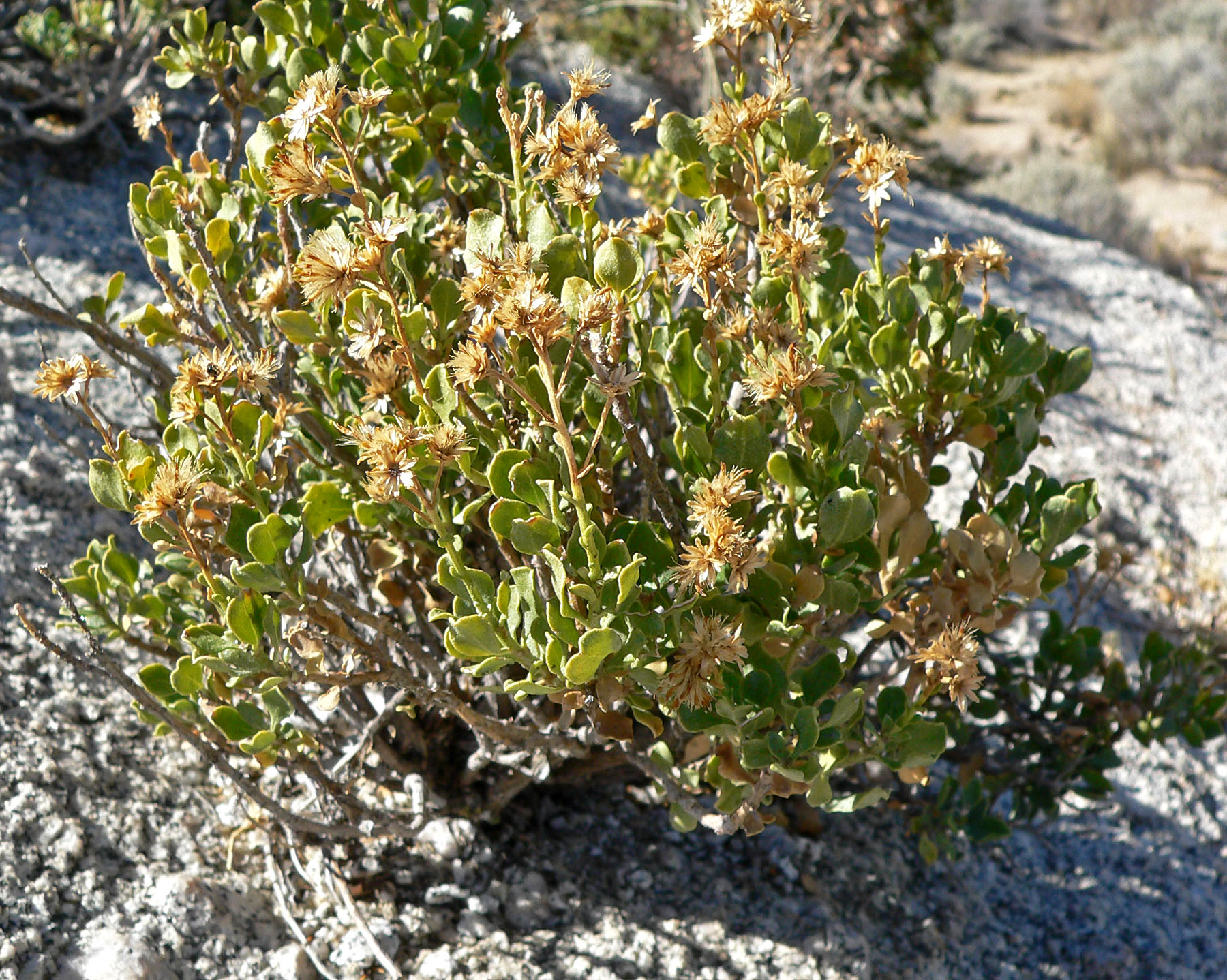

Scientific classification
- Kingdom: Plantae
- Clade: Tracheophytes
- Clade: Angiosperms
- Clade: Eudicots
- Clade: Asterids
- Order: Asterales
- Family: Asteraceae
- Genus: Ericameria
- Species: E. cuneata

Binomial name
- Ericameria cuneata (Gray) McClatchie

Synonyms
- Aster cuneatus (A.Gray) Kuntze; Bigelowia rupestris Greene; Chrysoma cuneata (A.Gray) Greene; Haplopappus cuneatus A.Gray; Aplopappus cuneatus A.Gray; Bigelowia spathulata A.Gray, syn of var. spathulata

= Ericameria cuneata =

Species of flowering plant

Ericameria cuneata is a species of flowering shrub in the family Asteraceae known by the common name cliff goldenbush. This plant is native to the southwestern United States (California, Nevada, Arizona, New Mexico) and northwestern Mexico (Baja California).

Ericameria cuneata grows on cliffs, mountainsides, and rocky hillsides. It is a small, glandular shrub sometimes reaching as much as 100 cm (40 inches) in height. Its wavy-edged leaves are rounded and oval-shaped, often with visible resin glands, and up to 2.5 centimeters (1 inch) long. Atop each of the many erect branches is an inflorescence of several golden yellow flower heads, each with few or up to 70 disc florets and sometimes a few short ray florets.

Varieties

- Ericameria cuneata var. cuneata - California
- Ericameria cuneata var. macrocephala Urbatsch - San Diego County in California
- Ericameria cuneata var. spathulata (A.Gray) H.M.Hall - California, Nevada, Arizona, New Mexico, Baja California
