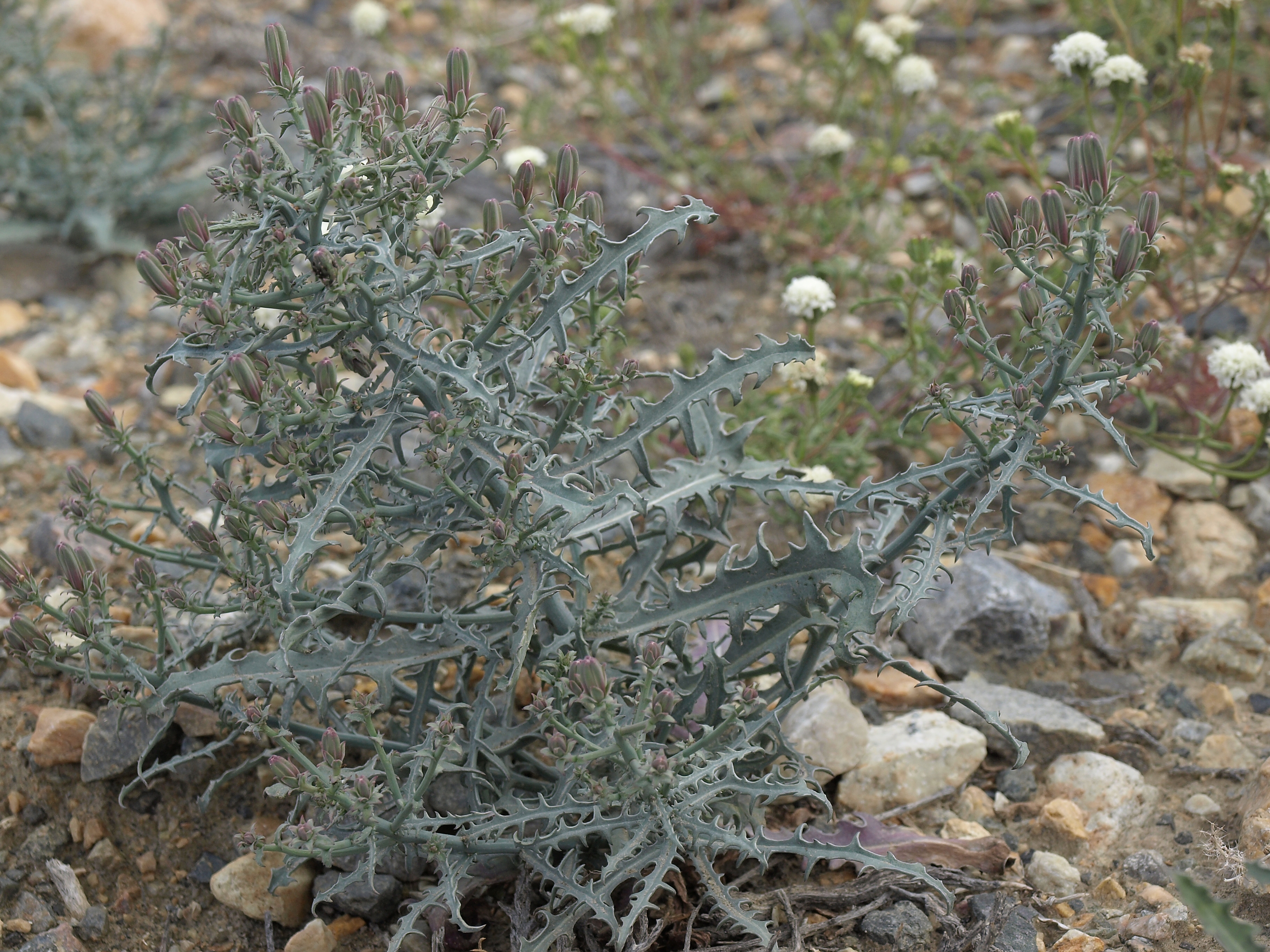

Scientific classification
- Kingdom: Plantae
- Clade: Tracheophytes
- Clade: Angiosperms
- Clade: Eudicots
- Clade: Asterids
- Order: Asterales
- Family: Asteraceae
- Genus: Stephanomeria
- Species: S. parryi

Binomial name
- Stephanomeria parryi A.Gray

= Stephanomeria parryi =

Species of plant

Stephanomeria parryi is a species of flowering plant in the family Asteraceae known by the common name Parry's wirelettuce. It is native to the southwestern United States, where it grows in many types of habitat, including many desert areas. It is a perennial herb growing from a thick root and producing one or more slender, upright stems up to about 40 centimeters tall. The green leaves are linear to lance-shaped with lobed edges and are up to 8 centimeters long near the base of the plant. Flower heads occur on the spreading branches. Each has up to 13 or 14 ray florets, each with an elongated tube and a whitish ligule up to 1.5 centimeters long. The fruit is an achene tipped with a spreading cluster of long, tan, plumelike pappus bristles.
