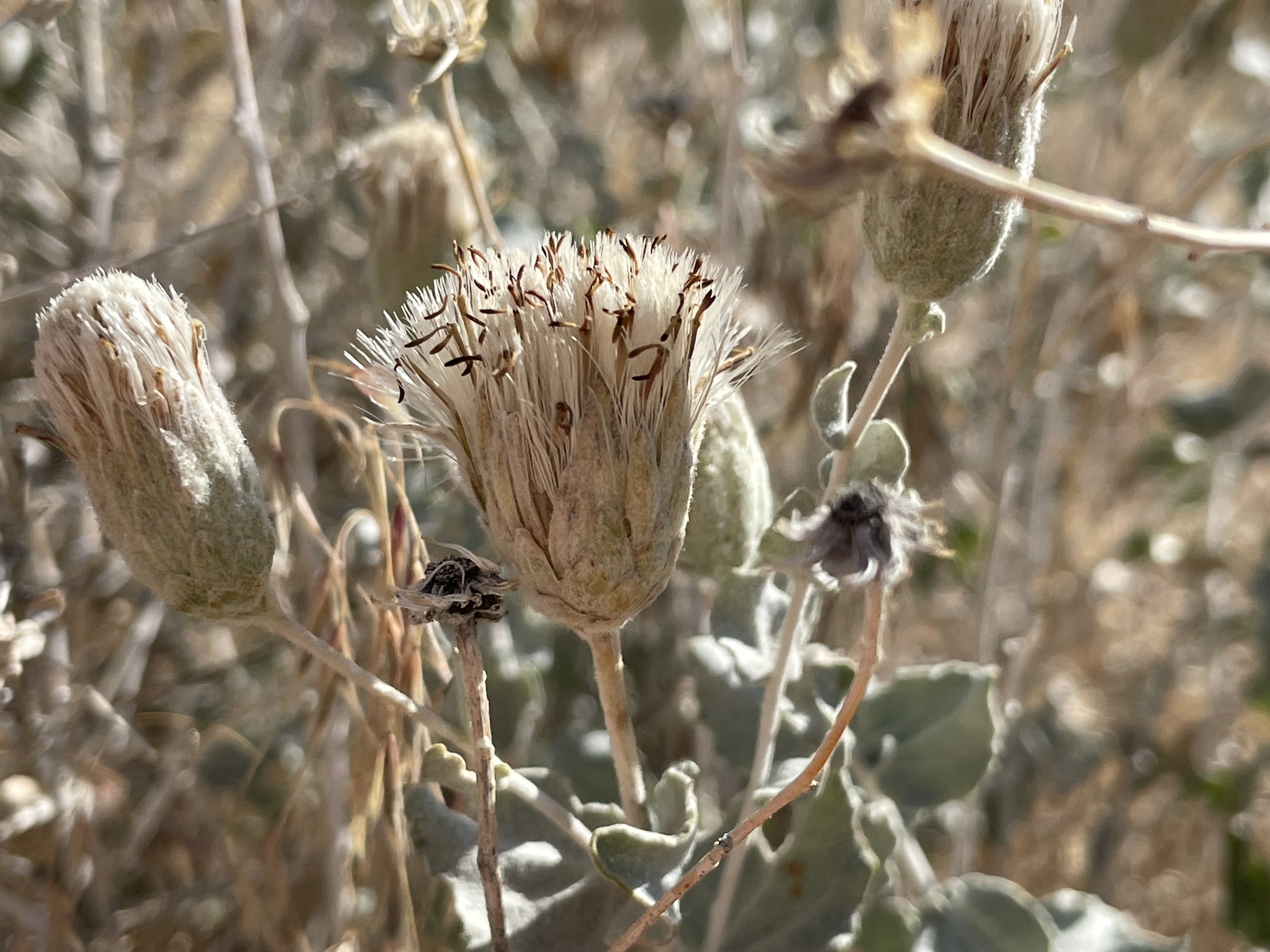

Scientific classification
- Kingdom: Plantae
- Clade: Tracheophytes
- Clade: Angiosperms
- Clade: Eudicots
- Clade: Asterids
- Order: Asterales
- Family: Asteraceae
- Genus: Brickellia
- Species: B. incana

Binomial name
- Brickellia incana A.Gray

Synonyms
- Coleosanthus incanus (A.Gray) Kuntze

= Brickellia incana =

Species of flowering plant

Brickellia incana is a North American species of flowering plant in the family Asteraceae known by the common name woolly brickellbush. It is native to the Mojave Desert and Sonoran Desert in the southwestern United States, in California, Nevada, and Arizona.

Brickellia incana is a shrub growing in a spherical clump on the sandy desert floor, 40 centimeters to 1 meter tall. The leaves are gray-green to white with a thin coat of woolly fibers, oval in shape and up to 3 centimeters long.

The inflorescences hold solitary flower heads, each about 2.4 centimeters long and lined with woolly gray-green to grayish purple phyllaries. Each flower head holds an array of about 60 red, yellowish, or grayish disc florets. The fruit is a hairy cylindrical achene about a centimeter long with a pappus of bristles.
