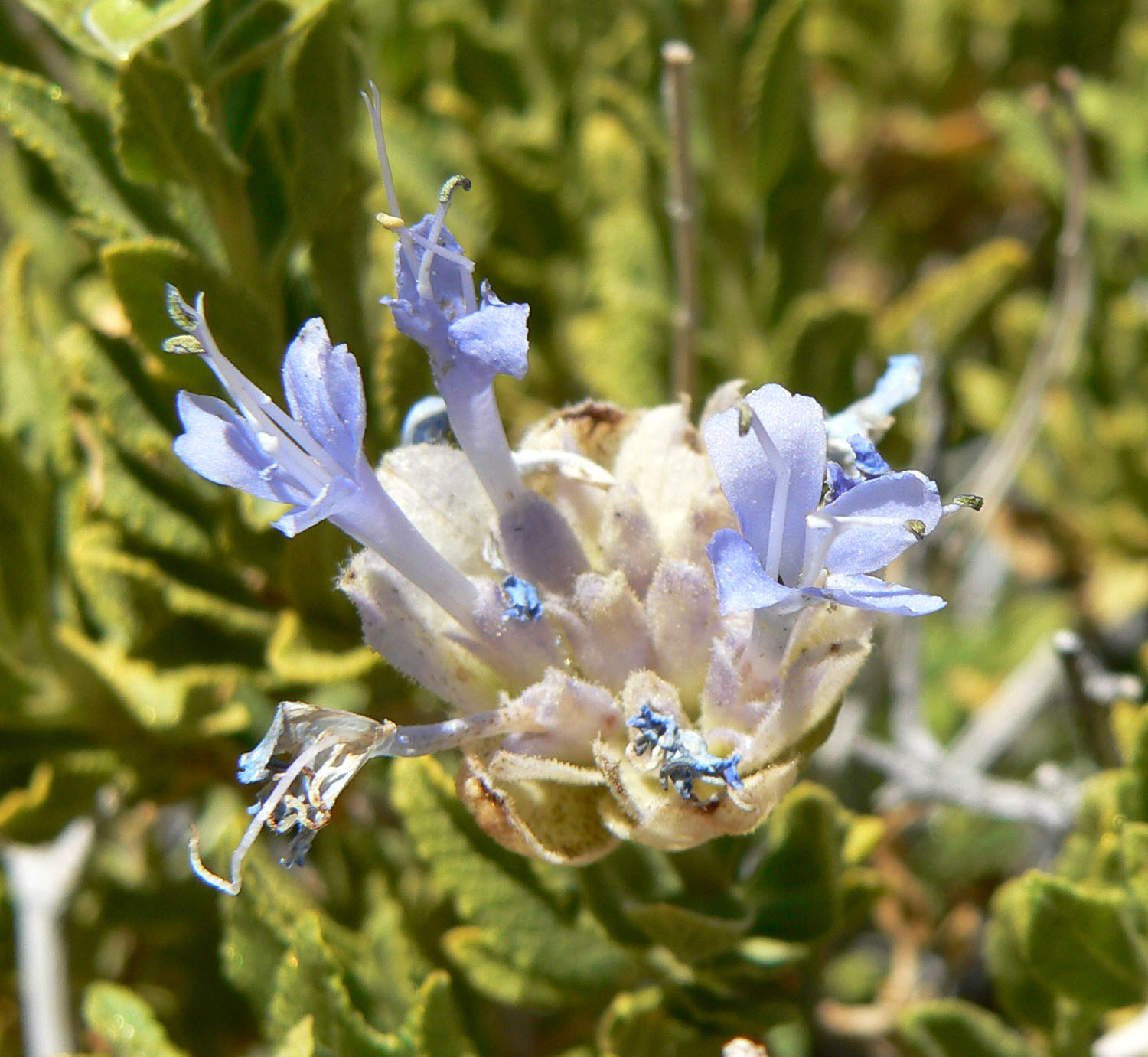

Scientific classification
- Kingdom: Plantae
- Clade: Tracheophytes
- Clade: Angiosperms
- Clade: Eudicots
- Clade: Asterids
- Order: Lamiales
- Family: Lamiaceae
- Genus: Salvia
- Species: S. mohavensis

Binomial name
- Salvia mohavensis Greene

= Salvia mohavensis =

Species of shrub

Salvia mohavensis (Mojave sage) is a species of sage endemic to the Mojave Desert. It is a low rounded shrub growing to 1 m tall with small opposite evergreen leaves 1.5–2 cm long, which are dark green or may appear nearly gray due to a covering of fine white hairs. The 2 cm long flowers are pale blue with protruding stamens, and occur in headlike whorls that occur singly at the tip of the stem. It blooms from April to June.
