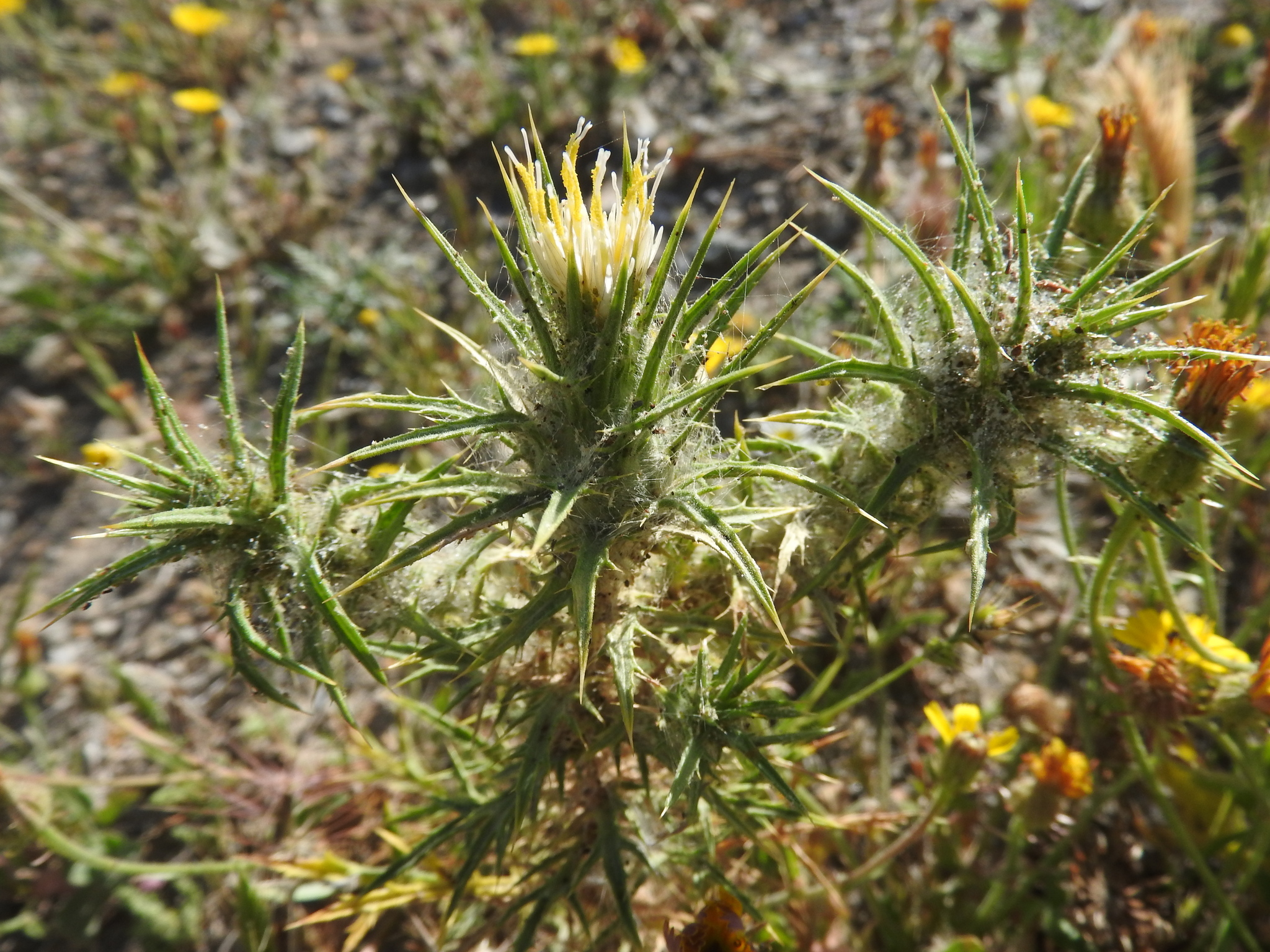
- In Algeria

Scientific classification
- Kingdom: Plantae
- Clade: Embryophytes
- Clade: Tracheophytes
- Clade: Angiosperms
- Clade: Eudicots
- Clade: Asterids
- Order: Asterales
- Family: Asteraceae
- Genus: Carthamus
- Species: C. creticus

Binomial name
- Carthamus creticus L.

Synonyms
- Carthamus lanatus subsp. baeticus (Boiss. & Reut.) Maire; Carthamus baeticus (Boiss. & Reut.) Nyman; Carthamus lanatus subsp. baeticus (Boiss. & Reut.) Nyman; Carthamus lanatus var. creticus (L.) Halácsy; Kentrophyllum baeticum Boiss. & Reut.; Carthamus lanatus subsp. creticus (L.) Holmboe; Carthamus divaricatus Bég. & Vacc.; Centaurea cretica (L.) Spreng.

= Carthamus creticus =

Species of flowering plant

Carthamus creticus is a plant species in the family Asteraceae, related to safflower.

It is native to the Mediterranean region including Europe (Spain, Portugal, France, Britain, Italy, Greece, Malta, Serbia, Bosnia, etc.), North Africa (Morocco, Algeria, Libya) and southwestern Asia (Turkey, Palestine, Cyprus). It is also naturalized in New Zealand and California.
