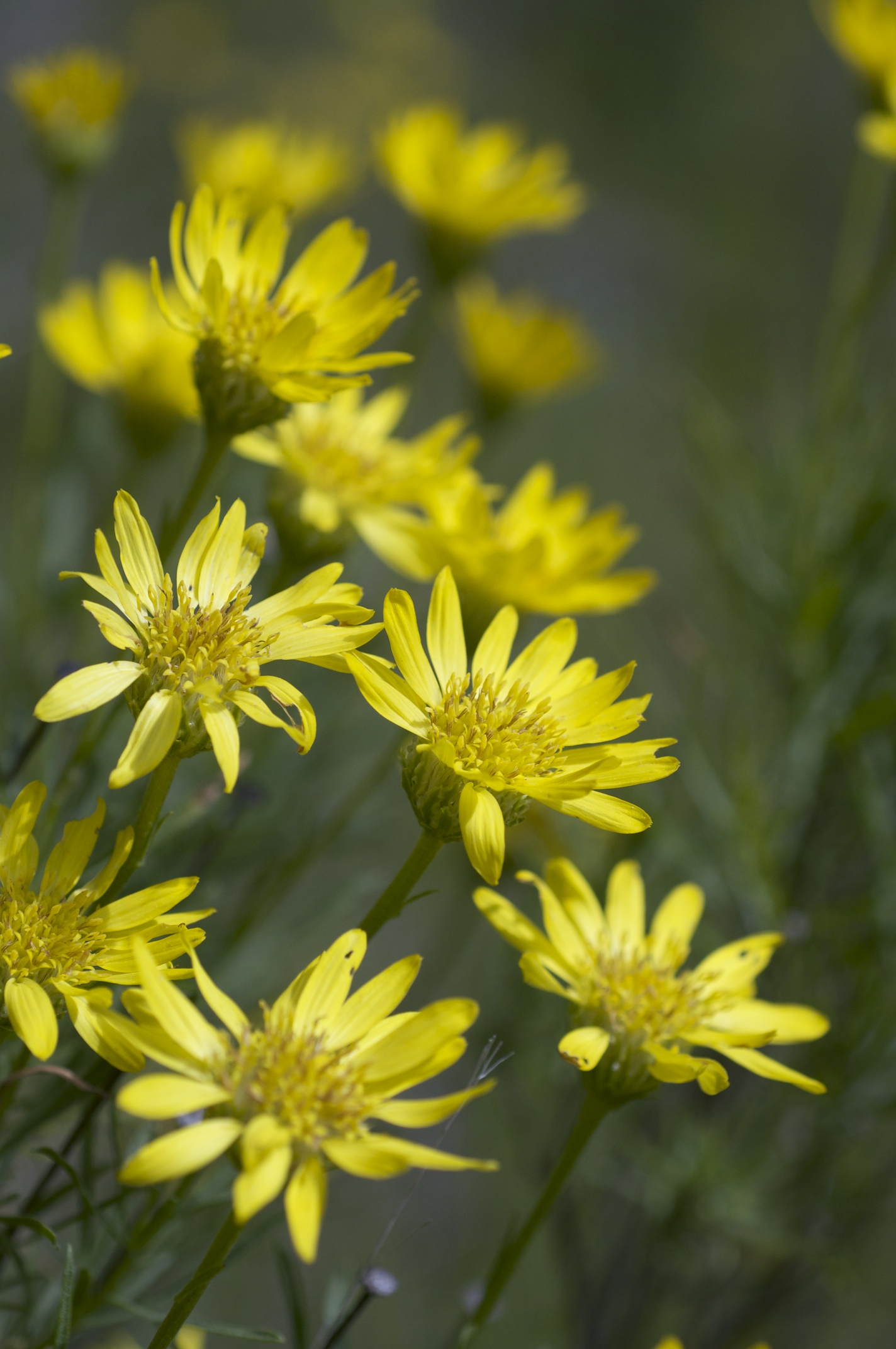

Scientific classification
- Kingdom: Plantae
- Clade: Tracheophytes
- Clade: Angiosperms
- Clade: Eudicots
- Clade: Asterids
- Order: Asterales
- Family: Asteraceae
- Genus: Ericameria
- Species: E. linearifolia

Binomial name
- Ericameria linearifolia (DC.) Urbatsch & Wussow

Synonyms
- Aster linearifolius (DC.) Kuntze; Aplopappus interior Coville; Aplopappus linearifolius DC.; Haplopappus interior Coville; Haplopappus linearifolius DC.; Stenotopsis interior (Coville) Rydb.; Stenotus interior (Coville) Greene; Stenotus linearifolius (DC.) Torr. & A.Gray

= Ericameria linearifolia =

Species of flowering plant

Ericameria linearifolia is a flowering plant in the family Asteraceae known by the common names narrowleaf goldenbush and interior goldenbush. It is native to California, Nevada, southwestern Utah, and Arizona.

Ericameria linearifolia is a shrub up to 150 cm (59 in) tall. One plant can produce several yellow flower heads, each at the end of a long leafless and unbranched stem. Each head contains up to 18 ray florets and as many as 60 disc florets. It grows in dry creek beds, deserts, mesas, and mountainsides with rocky or sandy soil.
