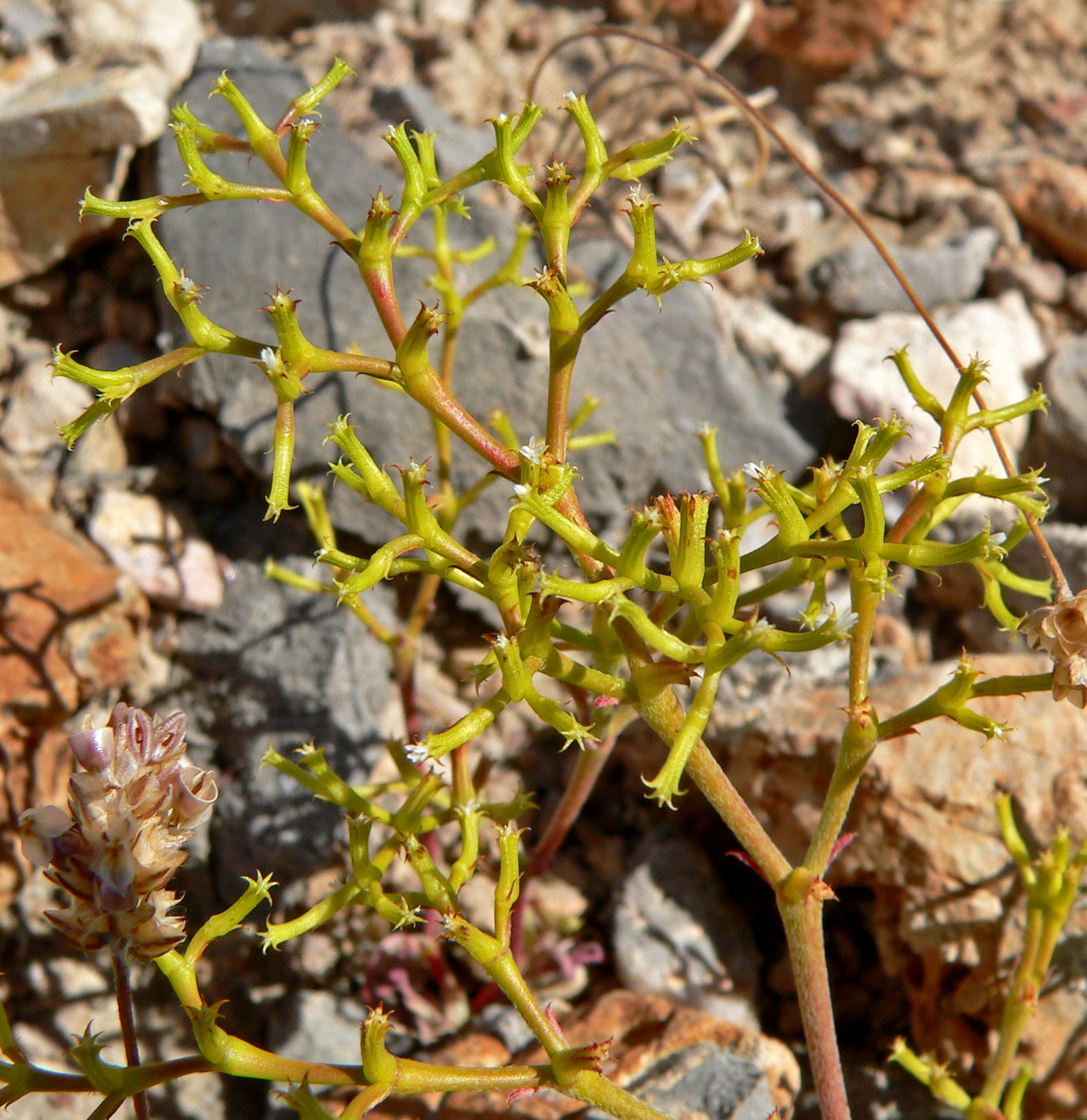

Scientific classification
- Kingdom: Plantae
- Clade: Tracheophytes
- Clade: Angiosperms
- Clade: Eudicots
- Order: Caryophyllales
- Family: Polygonaceae
- Genus: Chorizanthe
- Species: C. brevicornu

Binomial name
- Chorizanthe brevicornu Torr.

= Chorizanthe brevicornu =

Species of flowering plant

Chorizanthe brevicornu is a species of flowering plant in the buckwheat family which is known by the common name brittle spineflower. It is native to the southwestern United States and northern Mexico, where it is widely distributed but is most abundant in the deserts. The plant extends an erect, naked, highly branching stem which is greenish in color. Most of the leaves grow from the base of the plant, but a few small ones may appear up on the stem. At the end of each of the many branches is a tube-shaped inflorescence which opens into a tiny white or greenish-yellow flower a few millimeters wide. Chorizanthe brevicornu relies on wind and small mammals for seed dispersal. The brittle nature of the plant allows the inflorescence to break apart, aiding in spreading seeds across arid landscapes.

There are two subvarieties of C. brevicornu. This species includes two recognized varieties: C. brevicornu var. brevicornu and C. brevicornu var. spathulata.It is an annual herb that typically blooms between February and May.
