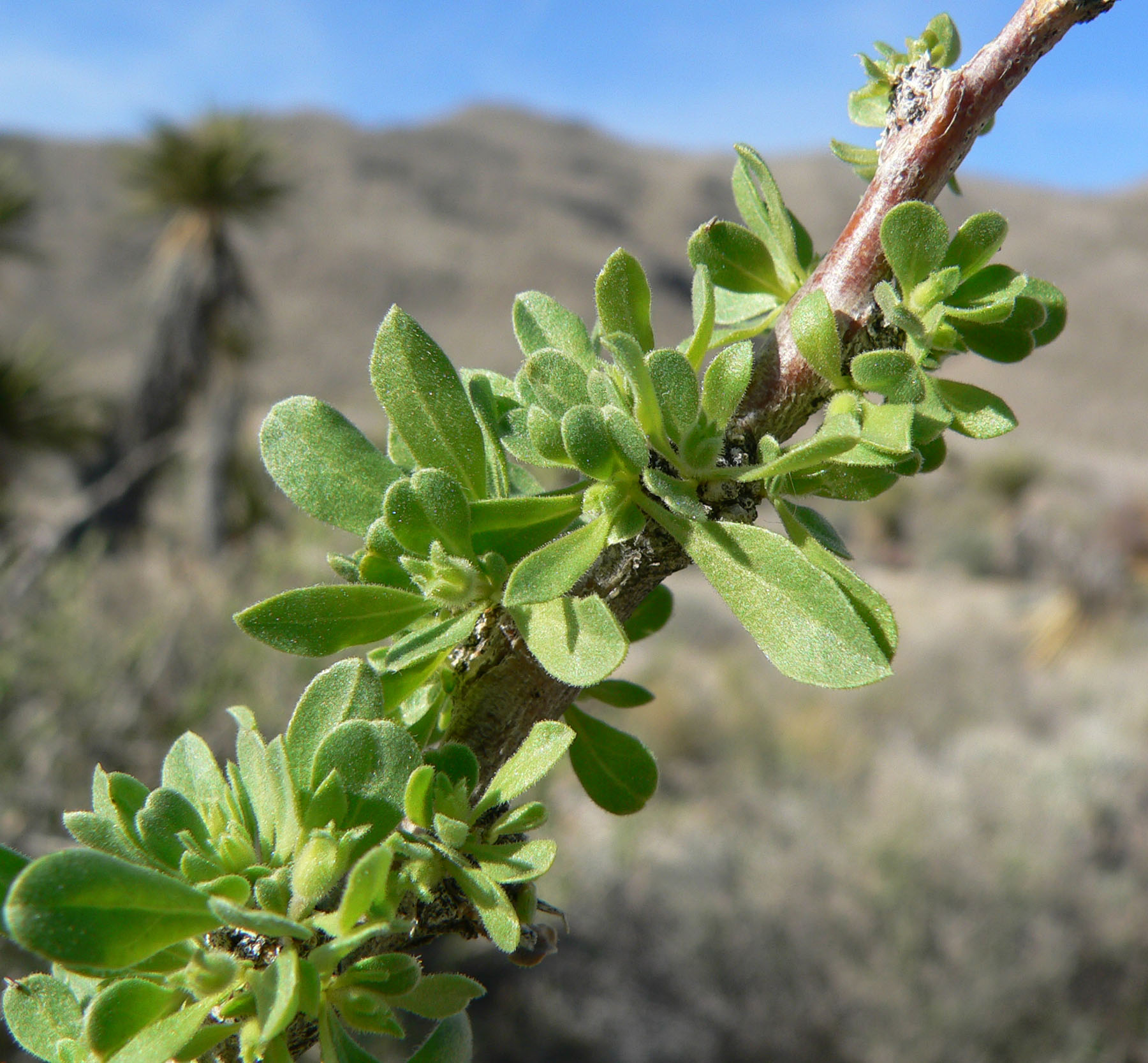

Scientific classification
- Kingdom: Plantae
- Clade: Tracheophytes
- Clade: Angiosperms
- Clade: Eudicots
- Clade: Asterids
- Order: Solanales
- Family: Solanaceae
- Genus: Lycium
- Species: L. cooperi

Binomial name
- Lycium cooperi A.Gray

= Lycium cooperi =

Species of flowering plant

Lycium cooperi is a species of flowering plant in the nightshade family known by the common name peach thorn. It is native to the southwestern United States, where it grows in a variety of desert and mountain habitat types. This is a bushy, erect shrub approaching a maximum height of 4 metres (13 ft) with many rigid, thorny branches. The branches are lined thickly with fleshy oval or widely lance-shaped leaves each 1–3 centimetres (0.39–1.18 in) long and coated with glandular hairs. The inflorescence is a small cluster of tubular flowers roughly 1–2 centimetres (0.39–0.79 in) long including the calyx of fleshy sepals at the base. The flower is white or greenish with lavender or green veining. The corolla is a tube opening into a face with four or five lobes. The fruit is a yellow or orange berry under a centimeter wide containing many seeds.
