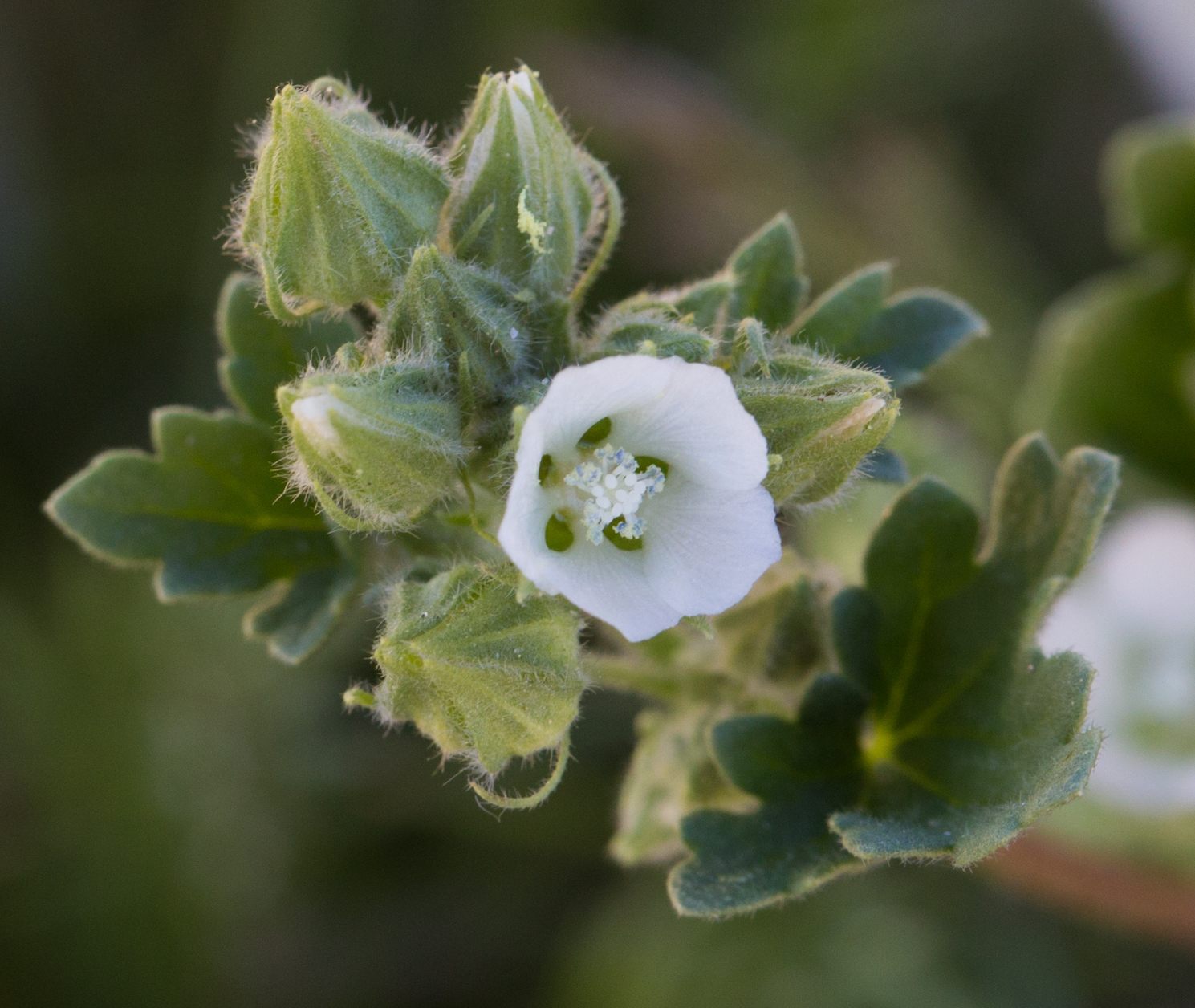
- In San Diego County, California

Scientific classification
- Kingdom: Plantae
- Clade: Tracheophytes
- Clade: Angiosperms
- Clade: Eudicots
- Clade: Rosids
- Order: Malvales
- Family: Malvaceae
- Genus: Eremalche
- Species: E. exilis

Binomial name
- Eremalche exilis (A.Gray) Greene

= Eremalche exilis =

Species of flowering plant

Eremalche exilis is a species of flowering plant in the mallow family known as white mallow or desert mallow. It is native to Baja California, Mexico and the southwestern United States where it grows in desert and other dry scrub habitats.

== Description ==
It is an annual herb growing mostly decumbent along the ground with hairy stems approaching 40 cm (16 in) in maximum length. The leaves are up to 2.5 cm (0.98 in) long and have three to five lobes which may be toothed at the tips. Solitary flowers can be found in the leaf axils, each a white, pink, or very pale purple cup usually less than 1 cm (0.39 in) wide. The fruit is disc divided into up to 13 segments. It flowers in the late winter to spring.
