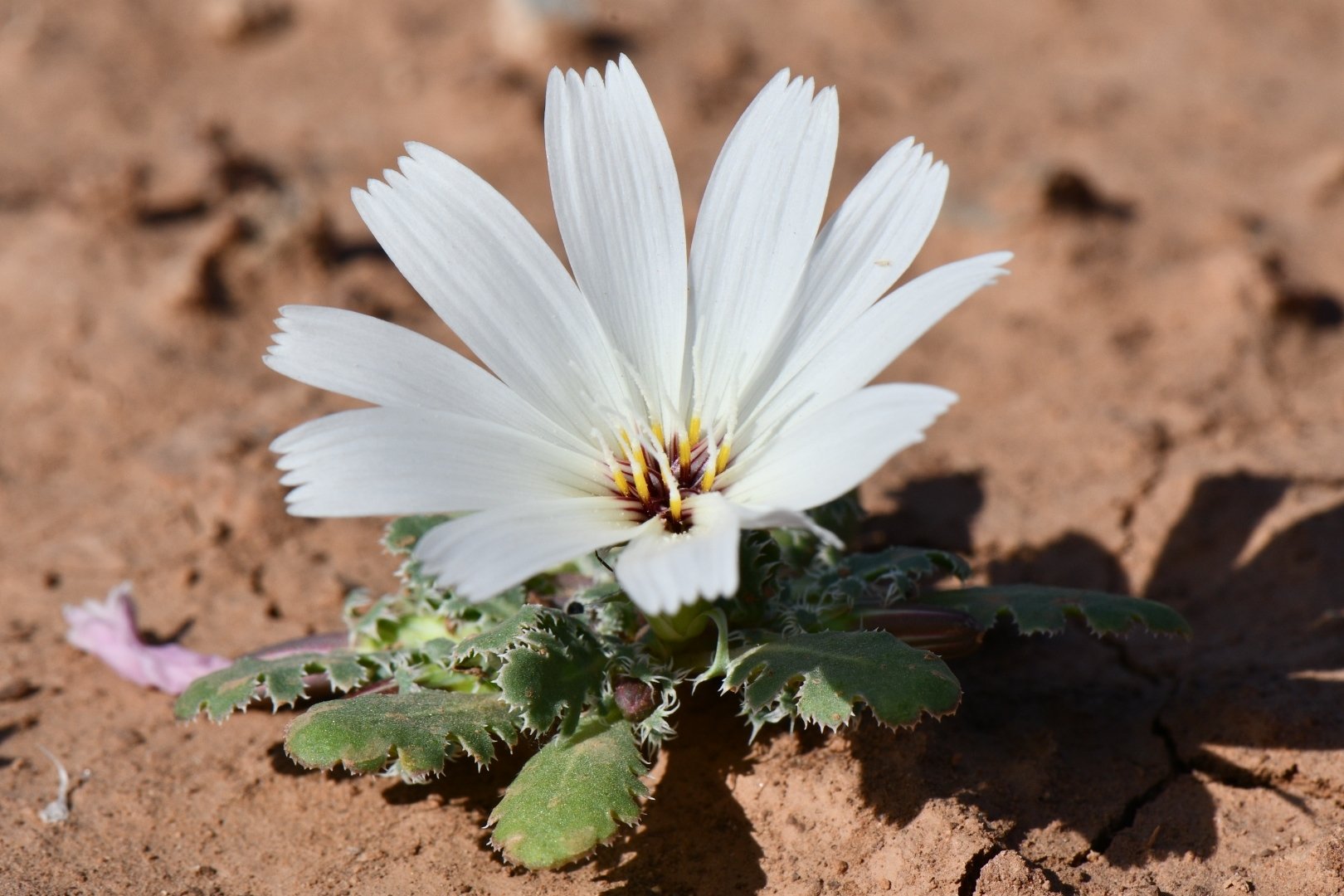

Scientific classification
- Kingdom: Plantae
- Clade: Embryophytes
- Clade: Tracheophytes
- Clade: Spermatophytes
- Clade: Angiosperms
- Clade: Eudicots
- Clade: Asterids
- Order: Asterales
- Family: Asteraceae
- Genus: Glyptopleura
- Species: G. setulosa

Binomial name
- Glyptopleura setulosa A.Gray

= Glyptopleura setulosa =

Species of flowering plant

Glyptopleura setulosa, the holy dandelion, is a species of North American plants in the family Asteraceae.

The species is native to the Western United States, primarily the Mojave Desert and Colorado Plateau regions in California, Nevada, Utah, and Arizona.
