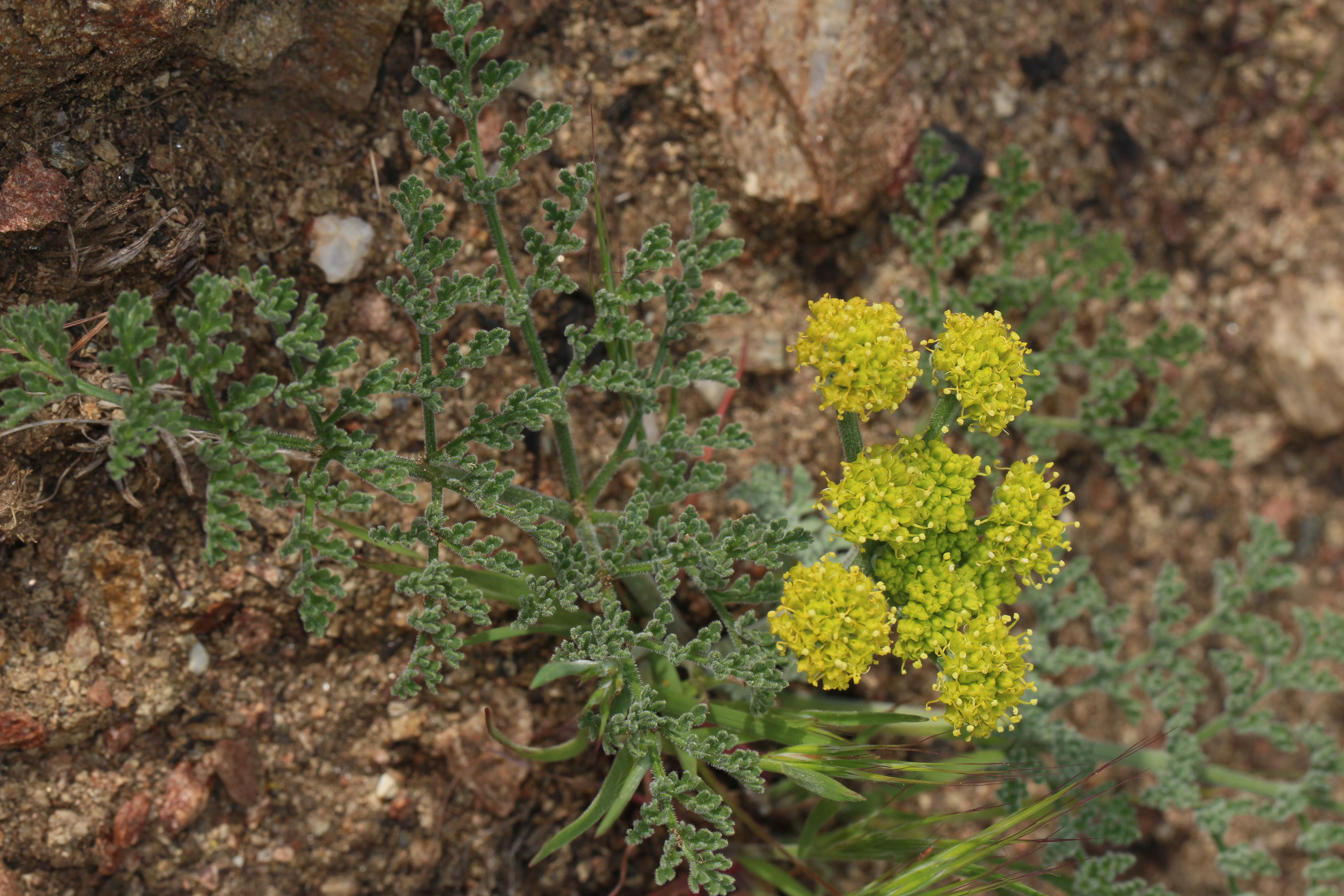

Scientific classification
- Kingdom: Plantae
- Clade: Tracheophytes
- Clade: Angiosperms
- Clade: Eudicots
- Clade: Asterids
- Order: Apiales
- Family: Apiaceae
- Genus: Lomatium
- Species: L. mohavense

Binomial name
- Lomatium mohavense J.M.Coult. & Rose

= Lomatium mohavense =

Species of flowering plant

Lomatium mohavense is a species of flowering plant in the carrot family known by the common name Mojave desertparsley. It is native to southern California with a few outlying populations in Arizona, Nevada and Baja California. It is found in several types of mountain and desert habitat, including chaparral, woodland, and scrub, mostly from 2,000–7,000 feet (600–2,100 m) elevation.

== Description ==
Lomatium mohavense is a hairy gray-green perennial herb growing 10 to 40 centimeters tall from an elongated taproot. There is generally no stem, the erect or spreading leaves and inflorescence emerging from ground level. The leaves may approach 20 centimeters long, their blades intricately divided and subdivided into crowded clusters of tiny segments. The inflorescence is an umbel of yellow to brownish to dark purple flowers.
