= Horse crippler =

Horse crippler is a common name for several cacti and may refer to:

- Grusonia parishii, native to California, Nevada, and Arizona
- Homalocephala texensis, native to New Mexico, Oklahoma, and Texas
