= Atriplex spinifera =

Conservation status
- Vulnerable (NatureServe)

Scientific classification
- Kingdom: Plantae
- Clade: Embryophytes
- Clade: Tracheophytes
- Clade: Angiosperms
- Clade: Eudicots
- Order: Caryophyllales
- Family: Amaranthaceae
- Genus: Atriplex
- Species: A. spinifera

Binomial name
- Atriplex spinifera J.F.Macbr.

Species of flowering plant

Atriplex spinifera is a species of saltbush, known by the common names spiny saltbush and spinescale saltbush.

It is endemic to California, where it grows in dry habitat with saline soils, such as salt flats. Its distribution includes the Mojave Desert, the southern Transverse Ranges, and the Central Valley, and surrounding mountain ranges. It is a halophyte.

== Description ==
Atriplex spinifera is a grayish or whitish brambly shrub with erect branching stems growing to a maximum height near 2 meters. The tangled branches are stiff and tipped with spiny points. The leaves are oval in shape and less than 3 centimeters in length.

The shrub is dioecious, with male and female individuals. The male flowers are small clusters in the leaf axils. The female flowers are solitary or borne in small clusters, and are enclosed in scaly bracts which become spherical as the fruit grows within.
