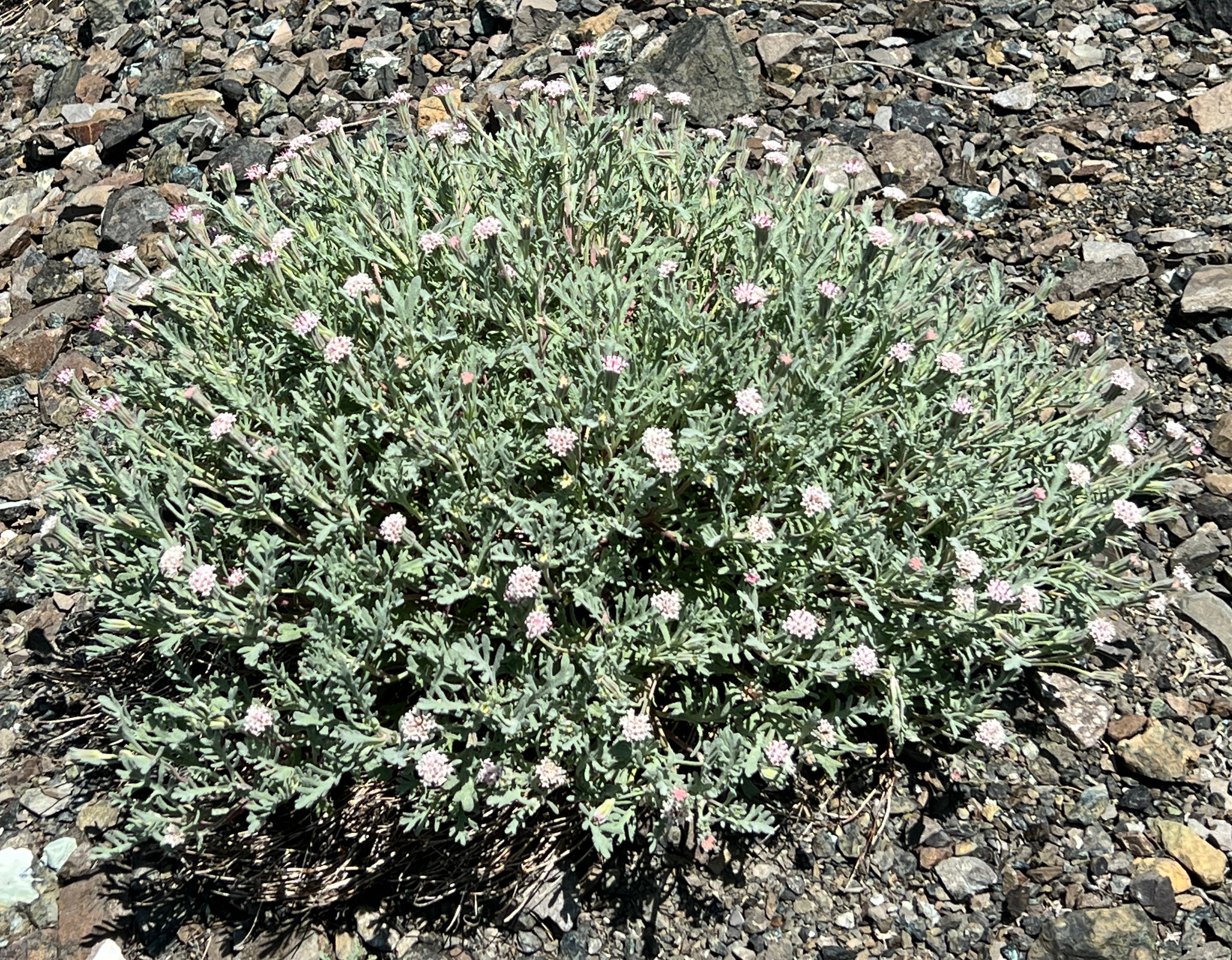

Scientific classification
- Kingdom: Plantae
- Clade: Tracheophytes
- Clade: Angiosperms
- Clade: Eudicots
- Clade: Asterids
- Order: Asterales
- Family: Asteraceae
- Genus: Chaenactis
- Species: C. thompsonii

Binomial name
- Chaenactis thompsonii Cronquist

= Chaenactis thompsonii =

Species of flowering plant

Chaenactis thompsonii is a North American species of flowering plants in the aster family known by the common name Thompson's pincushion and native to Washington State.

== Range and Habitat ==
Chaenactis thompsonii is endemic to the Wenatchee Mountains of the north-central Cascades in the US State of Washington. It grows in full sun and is strongly associated with rocky serpentine soils. Along with Lomatium cuspidatum, Oreocarya thompsonii, and Poa curtifolia, it is a strong indicator for serpentine in the area.

== Description ==
Chaenactis thompsonii is a perennial up to 30 cm (12 inches) tall, usually not forming extensive clumps or mats. Each vegetative branch may produce 1-3 flower heads each containing white or pale lavender disc florets but no ray florets, with wooly (tomentose) flower stalks (peduncles) and floral bracts (involucre). Leaves are sparsely woolly and singly pinnate with 2-5 pairs of generally flat entire lobes from multiple stems. The somewhat similar and much more widespread Chaenactis douglasii usually has doubly pinnate leaves, produces much taller flowering stem, and does not grow in serpentine soils.

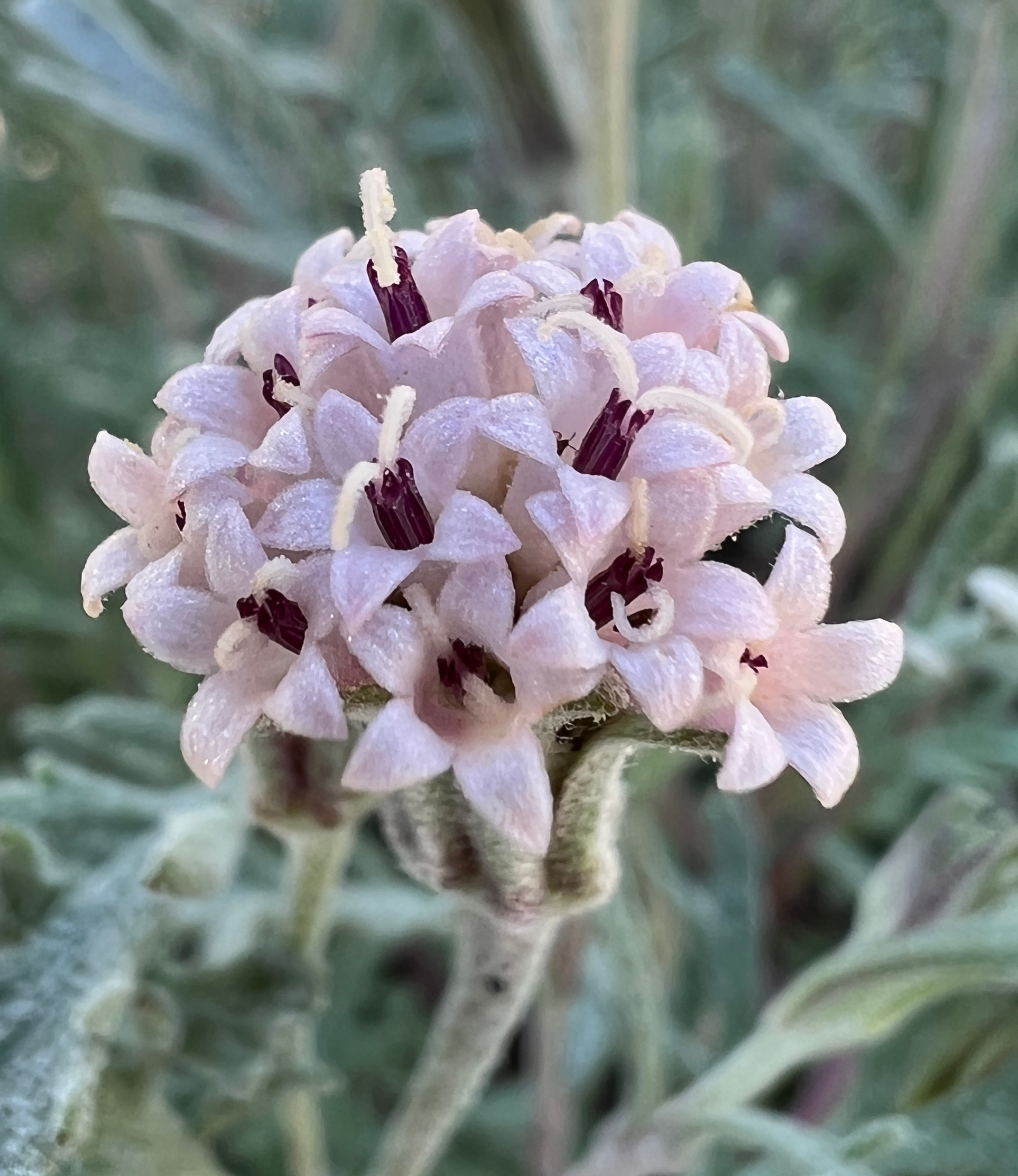
Chaenactis thompsonii flower

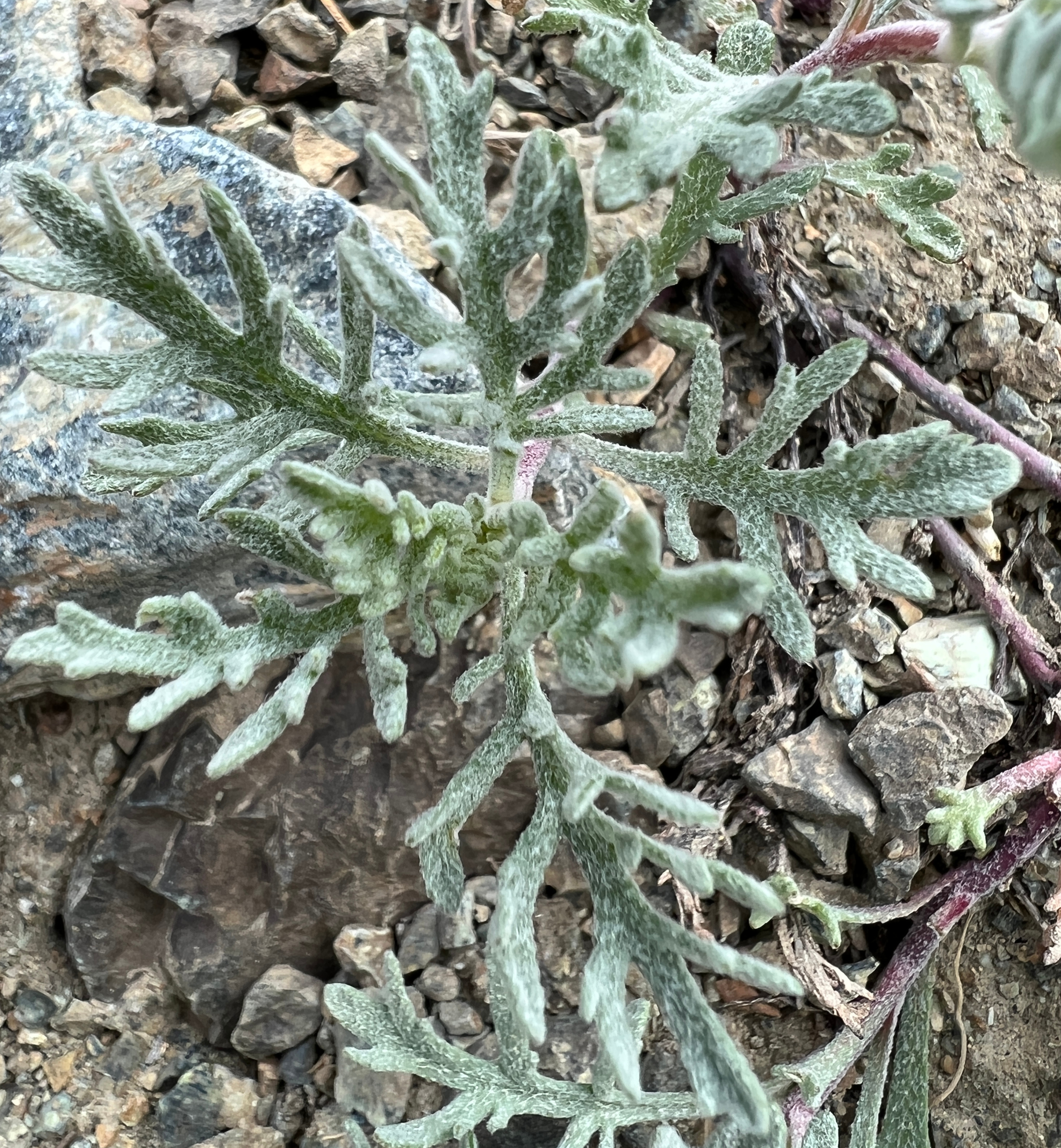
Chaenactis thompsonii leaves
