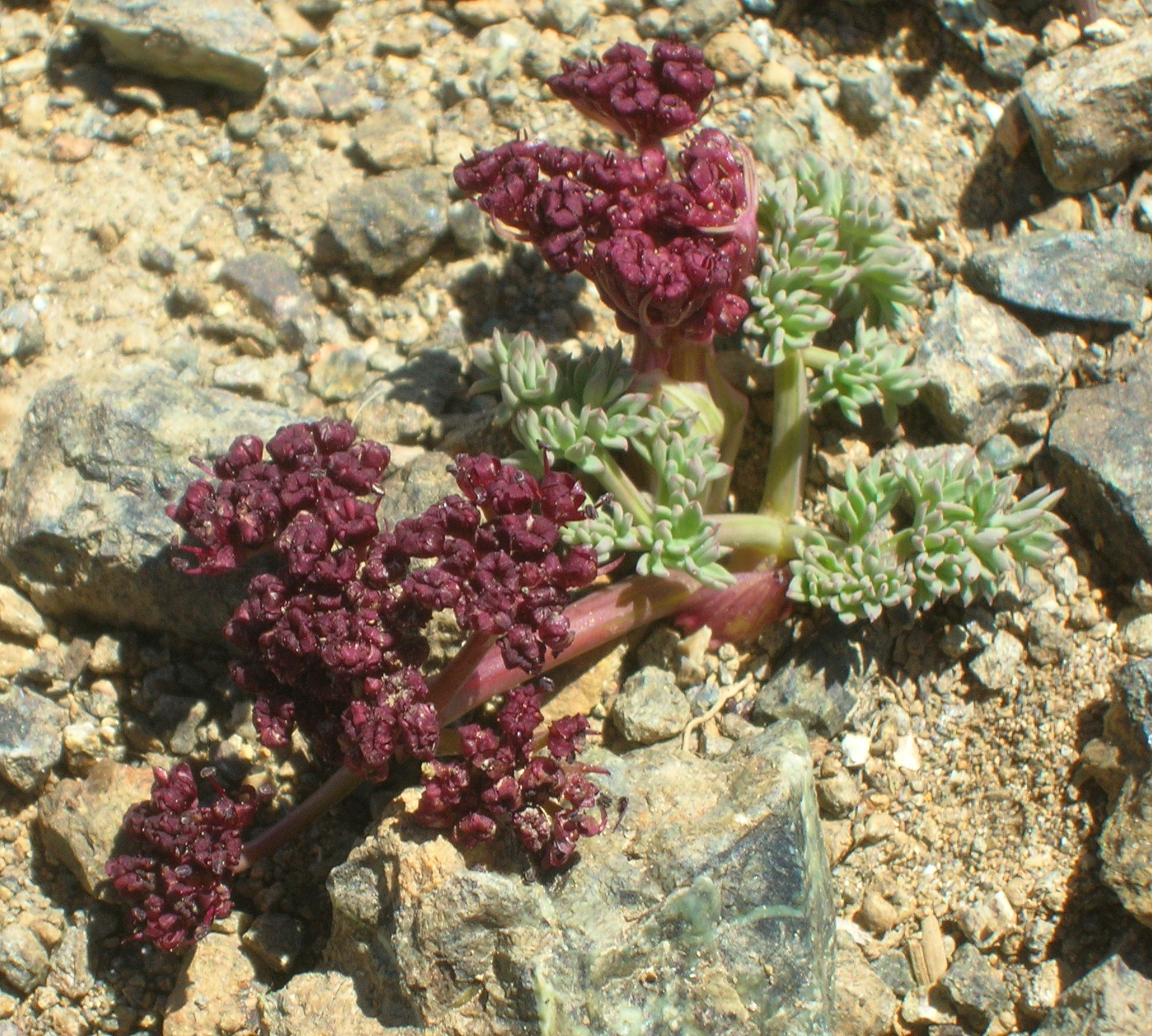
- In flower with leaves emerging

Scientific classification
- Kingdom: Plantae
- Clade: Tracheophytes
- Clade: Angiosperms
- Clade: Eudicots
- Clade: Asterids
- Order: Apiales
- Family: Apiaceae
- Genus: Lomatium
- Species: L. cuspidatum

Binomial name
- Lomatium cuspidatum (Math. & Const.)

= Lomatium cuspidatum =

Species of flowering plant

Lomatium cuspidatum (Wenatchee desertparsley) is a perennial herb of the family Apiaceae, native to the U.S. state of Washington. It is found primarily on open rocky slopes in the Wenatchee Mountains, strongly associated with serpentine scree and soils.

== Description ==
Plants are small, usually less than 20 cm (8 inches) tall. Foliage has a blue-gray to green color, and is held on thick fleshy stalks. Leaves are fleshy and are dissected into leaflets that have a sharp extended tip, referred to by the species name cuspidatum. Flowers appear early in the growth season (May to June) and are held above the foliage in a compound umbel on thick fleshy stalks that arise from the base of the plant. The flowers are brownish purple to brownish red in color.

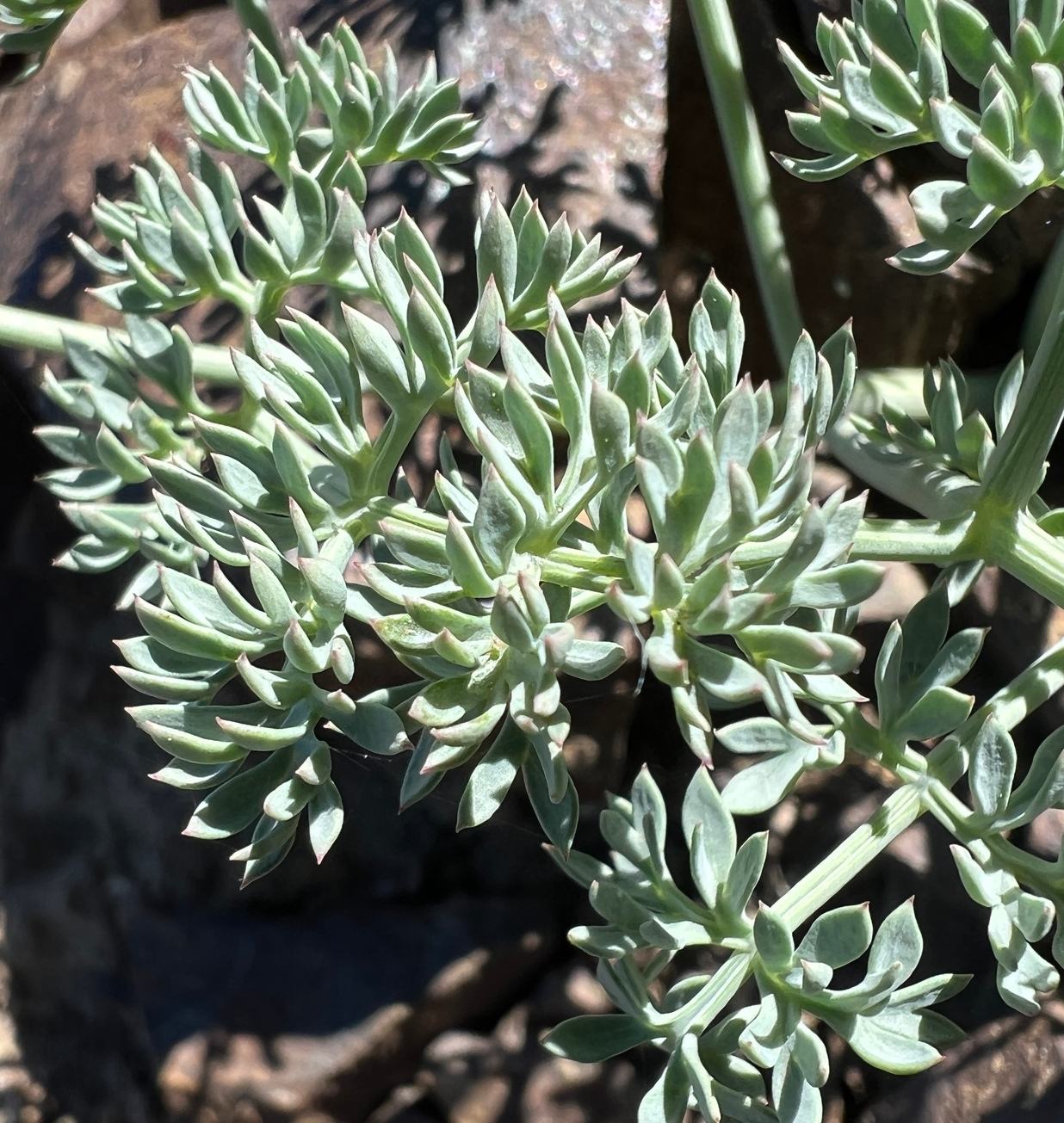
Lomatium cuspidatum, showing fleshy stems and leaves and the characteristic cusped leaflet tips.

Similar plants with yellow flowers and flatter leaflets that grow in the northern Wenatchee Mountains on non-serpentine soil are now classified as a distinct species Lomatium roneorum.

== Range and Ecology ==
Lomatium cuspidatum is endemic to serpentine regions (north Teanaway) of the Wenatchee Mountains in Washington State. It grows on seasonally dry sunny slopes composed mostly of small loose rocks (scree) and unstratified soils that are largely derived from serpentinite rock. Due to seasonal dryness, slope instability, and the unusual mineral composition of serpentine-related rocks, such slopes support a sparse and very restricted flora, including four species found only in this region (Lomatium cuspidatum, Chaenactis thompsonii, Oreocarya thompsonii, and Poa curtifolia). Several other plants are less narrowly restricted but are notably associated with serpentine soils and bedrock outcrops in the Wenatchee Mountains, including Polystichum lemmonii, Ivesia tweedyi, Androsace nivalis, Adiantum aleuticum, Aspidotis densa, Galium serpenticum, and Claytonia megarhiza.
