= Reuben Nevius =

American botanist and Episcopal priest

Reuben Denton Nevius (1827 – 14 December 1913) was an American botanist and Episcopal priest, missionary, and the first registrar of the Diocese of Olympia, Washington.

Born in Ovid, New York, the Rev. Reuben Denton Nevius received in 1849 his D.D. from Union College in Schenectady, New York. In 1850, Nevius went to Columbus, Georgia for further religious study. After ordination, he served as an Episcopal priest in Wetumpka, Alabama.

Nevius moved to Christ Church in Tuscaloosa in 1855. His interest in botanical science intensified, and he began four decades of correspondence with Asa Gray at Harvard University, sending him samples of plants and searching out examples at Gray’s request. Gray named five new plant species after Nevius, including two native to Oregon—Chaenactis nevii (Nevius's sunflower, John Day Valley) and Allium nevii (Nevius's wild onion, Hood River area). Although a Northerner, Nevius remained in Tuscaloosa during the Civil War. Following the war, in 1866 he accepted an invitation to become rector of All Saints’ Church in Oil City, Pennsylvania. While there, he married Margaret Tuomey. In 1869, the couple relocated to Mobile, Alabama, where Nevius had been appointed rector of St. John’s Episcopal Church, but Margaret died from yellow fever the following year.

In 1872, Nevius was given the ecclesiastical responsibility for a wide circuit in eastern Oregon, where he established seven new congregations. His circuit-riding responsibilities later included eastern Washington and Idaho. He directed the building of many new churches, some of which are still standing.

Asa Gray named the plant genus Neviusia in his honor. There has been a controversy over assigning credit for the discovery of this genus.

== Bibliography ==
- Albert Allen, Mission Accomplished: The Life of Reuben Denton Nevius, D.D. (New York: Vantage Press, 1998).
- David Powers and Gregory Nelson, A Gentleman of the Old School: Reuben Denton Nevius, 1827-1913, Botanist, Builder, Teacher, Churchman (Keizer, Oregon: Gregory L. Nelson, 2001).

== See also ==
- St. John's Episcopal Church (Olympia, Washington)
