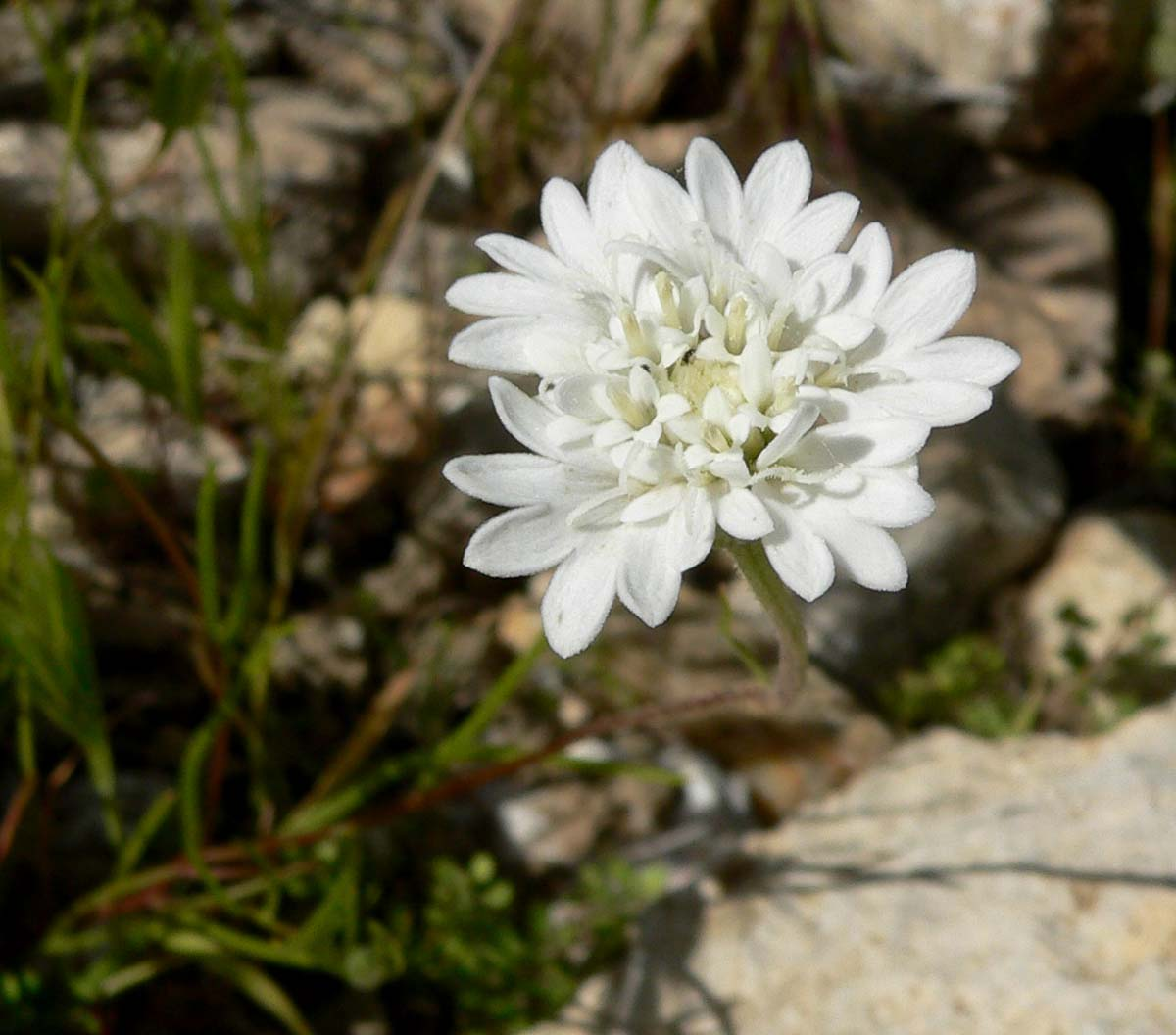
- Chaenactis fremontii

Scientific classification
- Kingdom: Plantae
- Clade: Tracheophytes
- Clade: Angiosperms
- Clade: Eudicots
- Clade: Asterids
- Order: Asterales
- Family: Asteraceae
- Subfamily: Asteroideae
- Tribe: Chaenactideae; B.G.Baldwin

Genera
- Chaenactis DC.; Dimeresia A.Gray; Orochaenactis Coville

= Chaenactideae =

Tribe of plants

Chaenactideae is a tribe of flowering plants in the subfamily Asteroideae of the family Asteraceae.

Chaenactideae genera recognized by the Global Compositae Database as of April 2022:

- Chaenactis DC.
- Dimeresia A.Gray
- Orochaenactis Coville
