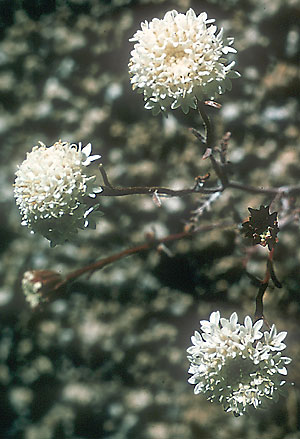

Scientific classification
- Kingdom: Plantae
- Clade: Tracheophytes
- Clade: Angiosperms
- Clade: Eudicots
- Clade: Asterids
- Order: Asterales
- Family: Asteraceae
- Genus: Chaenactis
- Species: C. xantiana

Binomial name
- Chaenactis xantiana A.Gray

Synonyms
- Chaenactis floribunda Greene

= Chaenactis xantiana =

Species of flowering plant

Chaenactis xantiana, the Mojave pincushion or Xantus pincushion, is a flowering plant in the family Asteraceae, native to the western United States, from southeastern Oregon, Nevada, southern and eastern California and northwestern Arizona. It is very common in the Antelope Valley in the Mojave Desert, and grows in sandy soils.

== Description ==
Chaenactis xantiana is an annual plant growing to 50 cm tall. The leaves are somewhat succulent, 3–7 cm long and 3–4 mm broad, in a basal rosette on the young plants which wither away during flowering, and spirally arranged leaves on the flowering stem; they are green, finely flecked with white scales giving an overall grayish color to the plant.

The Mojave pincushion flowers are produced in a capitulum 3–6 cm diameter, and are white.

It is similar to Chaenactis stevioides (Esteve pincushion).

The species is named for Hungarian-American ichthyologist John Xantus (1825-1894).
