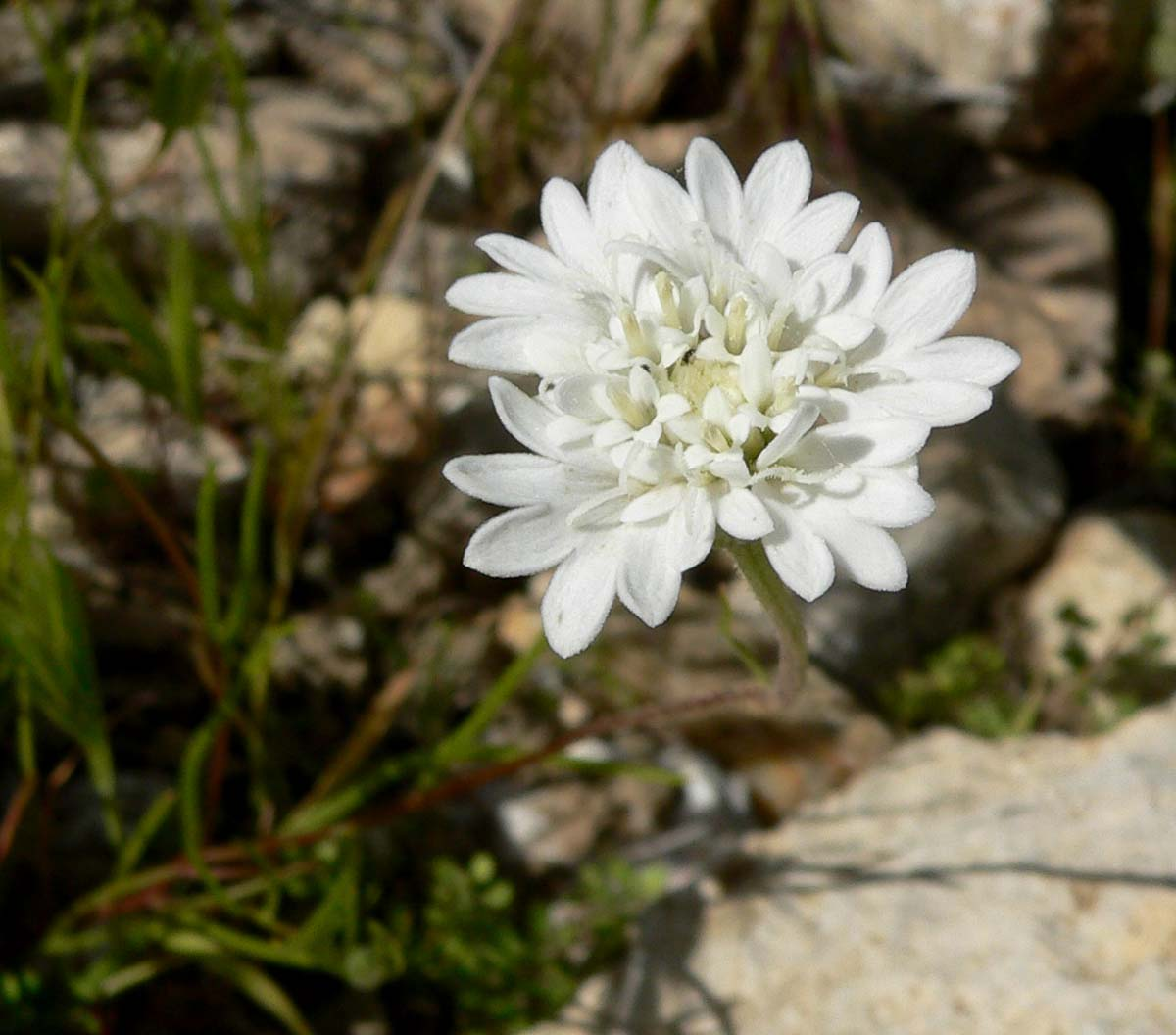
- Chaenactis fremontii

Scientific classification
- Kingdom: Plantae
- Clade: Embryophytes
- Clade: Tracheophytes
- Clade: Spermatophytes
- Clade: Angiosperms
- Clade: Eudicots
- Clade: Asterids
- Order: Asterales
- Family: Asteraceae
- Subfamily: Asteroideae
- Tribe: Chaenactideae
- Genus: Chaenactis; DC.

Synonyms
- Acicarphaea Walp.; Macrocarphus Nutt.; Acarphaea Harv. & A.Gray ex A.Gray

= Chaenactis =

Genus of flowering plants

Chaenactis is a genus of plants in the family Asteraceae which are known generally as pincushions and dustymaidens.

These wildflowers are native to western North America, especially the desert southwest of the United States. They are quite variable in appearance. They are generally aster-like in appearance with many disc florets in each head. There may be only disc florets, but sometimes there are also enlarged ray florets along the edges of the corolla. They may be white to yellow or pink.

== Species ==
Species include:

- Chaenactis alpigena — Southern Sierra pincushion; California, Nevada.
- Chaenactis artemisiifolia — White pincushion; California, Baja California.
- Chaenactis carphoclinia — Pebble pincushion; California, Baja California, Nevada, Arizona, Utah, New Mexico.
- Chaenactis cusickii — Oregon, Idaho.
- Chaenactis douglasii — Douglas' dustymaiden; California, Nevada, Arizona, Utah, New Mexico, Colorado, Wyoming, Nebraska, South Dakota, North Dakota. Montana Idaho Oregon Washington British Columbia Alberta
- Chaenactis evermannii — Idaho.
- Chaenactis fremontii — Fremont's pincushion; California, Baja California, Nevada, Arizona, Utah.
- Chaenactis furcata — Baja California.
- Chaenactis glabriuscula — Yellow pincushion; California, Baja California.
- Chaenactis lacera — Baja California, Baja California Sur
- Chaenactis macrantha — Bighead dustymaiden; California, Nevada, Arizona, Utah, Idaho, Oregon.
- Chaenactis nevadensis — Nevada dustymaiden; California, Nevada.
- Chaenactis nevii — Oregon
- Chaenactis parishii — Parish's dustymaiden; California, Baja California.
- Chaenactis santolinoides - Santolina dustymaiden; California.
- Chaenactis stevioides — Esteve's pincushion; California, Baja California, Baja California Sur, Nevada, Arizona, Sonora, Utah, Idaho, Oregon, Idaho, Wyoming, Colorado, New Mexico, New York State.
- Chaenactis suffrutescens — Shasta dustymaiden; California, Oregon.
- Chaenactis thompsonii — Washington
- Chaenactis xantiana — Mojave pincushion; California, Baja California, Nevada, Arizona, Oregon.
