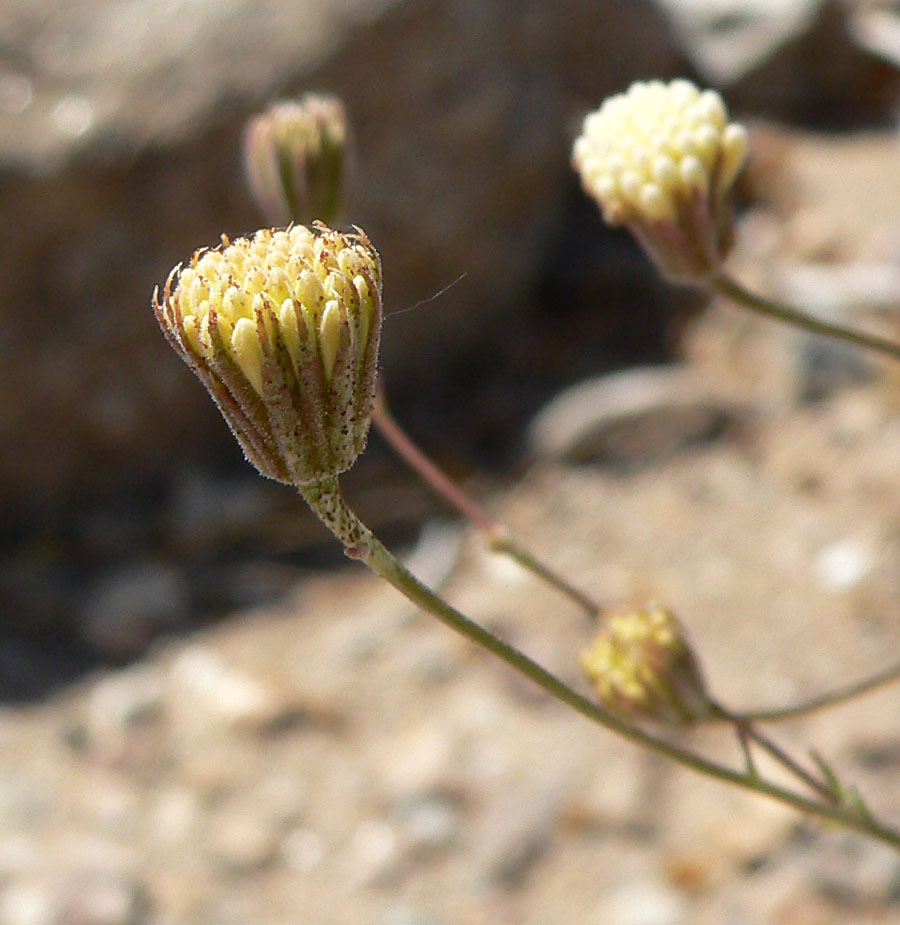
- Chaenactis carphoclinia var. carphoclinia in Death Valley, California

Scientific classification
- Kingdom: Plantae
- Clade: Tracheophytes
- Clade: Angiosperms
- Clade: Eudicots
- Clade: Asterids
- Order: Asterales
- Family: Asteraceae
- Genus: Chaenactis
- Species: C. carphoclinia

Binomial name
- Chaenactis carphoclinia A.Gray

Synonyms
- Chaenactis attenuata A.Gray; Chaenactis paleolifera A.Nelson; Chaenactis peirsonii Jeps., syn of var. peirsonii

= Chaenactis carphoclinia =

Species of flowering plant

Chaenactis carphoclinia is a species of flowering plant in the daisy family known by the common name pebble pincushion. It is native to the southwestern United States and northwestern Mexico, where it grows in rocky and gravelly habitat, such as the California deserts. The species is found in southern California, Nevada, Utah, Arizona, southwestern New Mexico, Baja California, Sonora.

== Description ==
Chaenactis carphoclinia, or pebble pincushion, is an annual herb growing an erect, branching stem up to about 60 centimeters (2 feet) in maximum height. The longest leaves are about 10 centimeters (4 inches) long and are usually divided into a few lobes. The inflorescence bears a few flower heads, each up to a centimeter wide. The head is lined with flat, sharp-pointed phyllaries which are reddish. The head contains several white or pink-tinted flowers with long, protruding anthers. The fruit is an achene a few millimeters in length tipped with a scaly pappus.

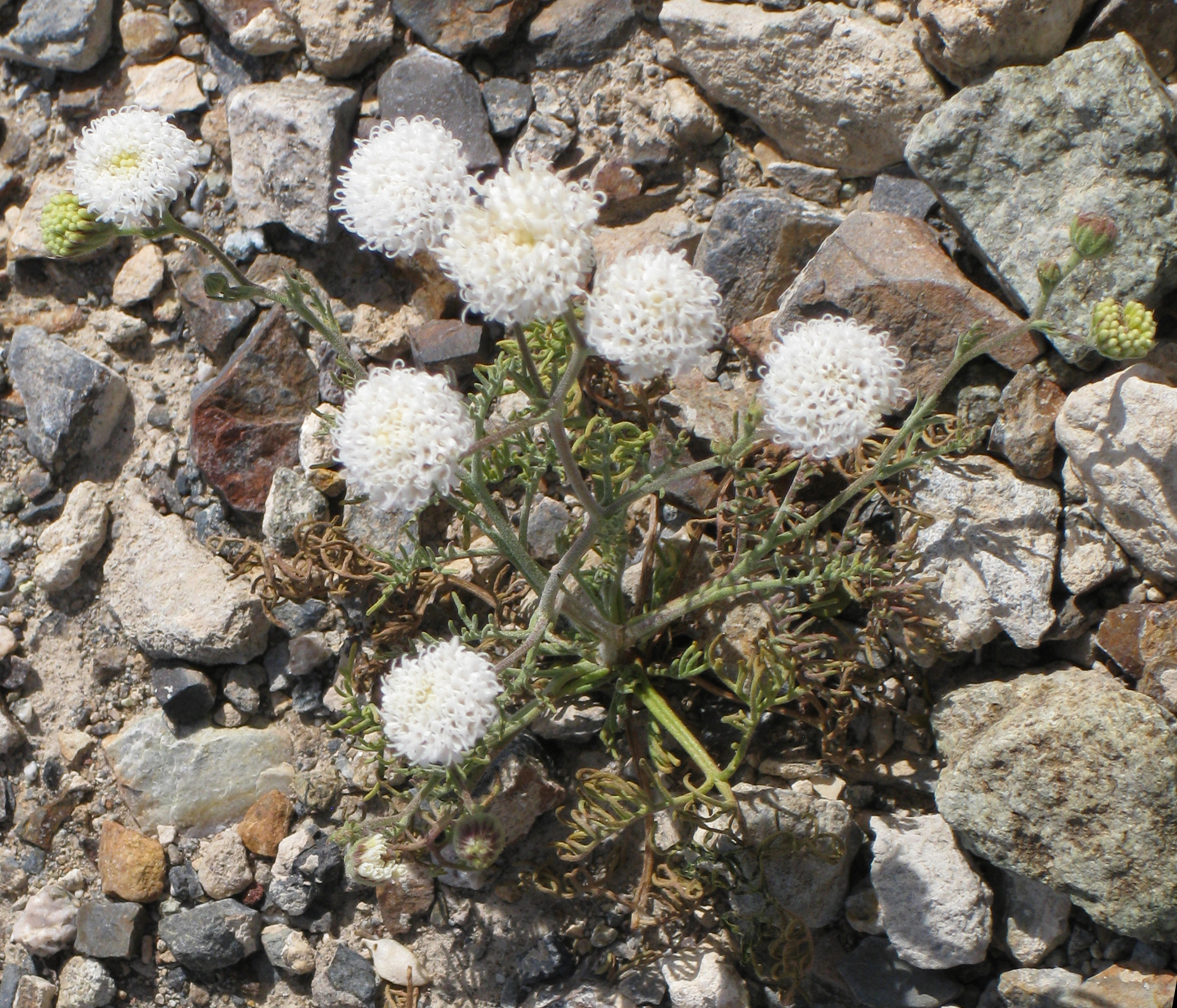
Small plant of C. carphoclinia, in 2016 Death Valley superbloom

Varieties

There are two varieties of Chaenactis carphoclinia:

- Chaenactis carphoclinia var. carphoclinia is a smaller variety found throughout the species range
- Chaenactis carphoclinia var. piersonii is a larger variety known only from the Santa Rosa Mountains in southern California
