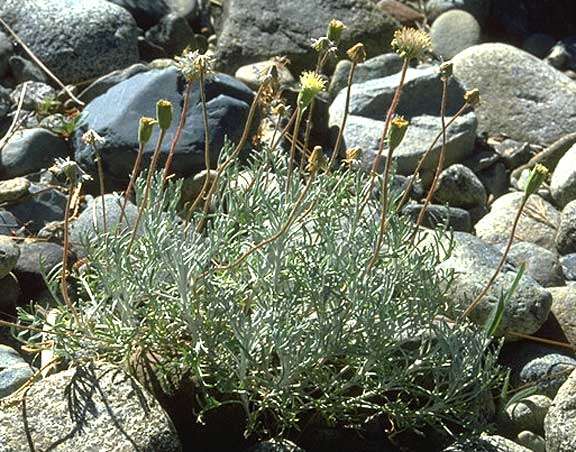

Conservation status
- Vulnerable (NatureServe)

Scientific classification
- Kingdom: Plantae
- Clade: Tracheophytes
- Clade: Angiosperms
- Clade: Eudicots
- Clade: Asterids
- Order: Asterales
- Family: Asteraceae
- Genus: Chaenactis
- Species: C. suffrutescens

Binomial name
- Chaenactis suffrutescens A.Gray

= Chaenactis suffrutescens =

Species of flowering plant

Chaenactis suffrutescens is a species of flowering plant in the aster family known by the common name Shasta chaenactis.

It is native to California, where it is known only from Shasta and Trinity Counties in the far northern part of the state, and also to Oregon, where it has been found in Josephine County. It grows in coniferous forests and other habitat in the Klamath Mountains and the southernmost Cascade Range mountains, sometimes on serpentine soils.

== Description ==
Chaenactis suffrutescens is a spreading subshrub producing several branching erect stems reaching up to about 50 cm (20 inches) tall. The leaves are several centimeters long and divided into several lobes which are subdivided into smaller lobes. The leaves are coated in feltlike white woolly fibers.

The inflorescence is a cylindrical flower head atop an erect, stout peduncle. Each head is lined with glandular, hairy phyllaries and contains several white or pink-tinged disc florets with protruding anthers. The disc florets have ray-like lobes on their corollas, but there are no true ray florets.

The fruit is an achene over a centimeter long including the pappus of scales.
