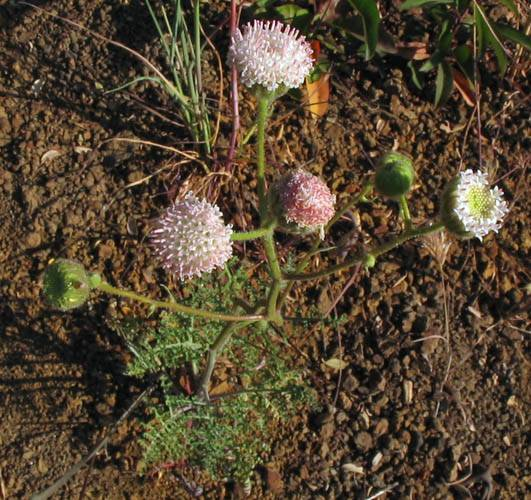

Conservation status
- Vulnerable (NatureServe)

Scientific classification
- Kingdom: Plantae
- Clade: Tracheophytes
- Clade: Angiosperms
- Clade: Eudicots
- Clade: Asterids
- Order: Asterales
- Family: Asteraceae
- Genus: Chaenactis
- Species: C. artemisiifolia

Binomial name
- Chaenactis artemisiifolia (Harv. & A.Gray) A.Gray

Synonyms
- Chaenactis artemisiaefolia (Harv. & A.Gray) A.Gray; Acarphaea artemisiifolia Harv. & A.Gray ex A.Gray; Acicarphaea artemisiifolia Walp.; Acarphaea artemisiaefolia Harv. & A.Gray ex A.Gray; Acicarphaea artemisiaefolia Walp.

= Chaenactis artemisiifolia =

Species of flowering plant

Chaenactis artemisiifolia, with the common name white pincushion, is a species of flowering plant in the daisy family. It is native to the coastal Peninsular Ranges of Southern California and Baja California, in the chaparral and woodlands.

== Description ==
Chaenactis artemisiifolia is a robust annual herb producing an erect stem occasionally as tall as two meters-6 feet but usually under one meter-3 feet in height. There is a basal rosette of leaves and sparse leaves along the stem. The leaves are up to about 15 centimeters (6 inches) or more in length and they are divided into many lobes which are further subdivided into smaller, lacy lobes. The leaves and stem are lightly woolly; older plants have thinner coats of hair.

The stem branches about midway up and bears several flower heads in a wide open inflorescence. Each head is a hairy hemispheric cup of sharp-tipped phyllaries which can be up to a centimeter long. The flower heads are discoid, containing only disc florets, but some of them are flat enough to resemble ray florets or petals. The florets are white to pink. The anthers and curly styles protrude far from each floret, making the flower head look like a pincushion. The fruit is a compressed achene about half a centimeter long with no pappus.
