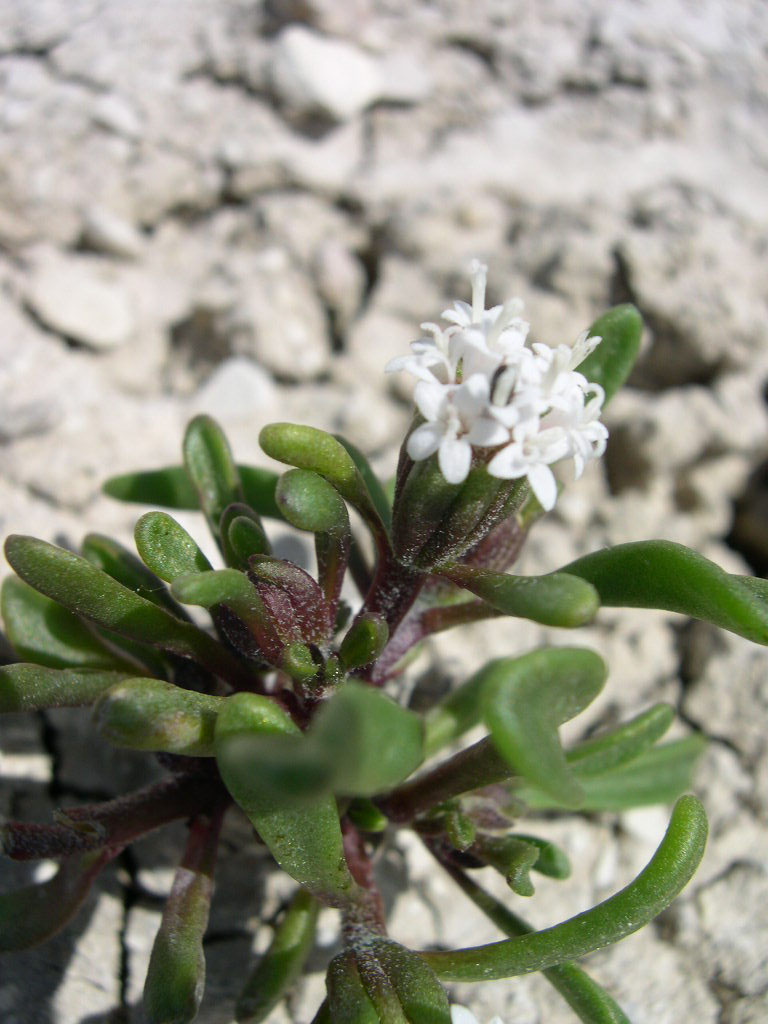

Scientific classification
- Kingdom: Plantae
- Clade: Tracheophytes
- Clade: Angiosperms
- Clade: Eudicots
- Clade: Asterids
- Order: Asterales
- Family: Asteraceae
- Genus: Chaenactis
- Species: C. cusickii

Binomial name
- Chaenactis cusickii Greene

= Chaenactis cusickii =

Species of flowering plant

Chaenactis cusickii is a North American species of flowering plants in the aster family known by the common name Morning brides or Cusick's pincushion. It has been found only in southeastern Oregon and southwestern Idaho.

== Description ==
Chaenactis cusickii is a small perennial rarely more than 15 cm (6 inches) tall. Each branch produces 1-5 (occasionally more) flower heads each containing white or pale pink disc florets but no ray florets.

The species is named for American botanist William Conklin Cusick (1842-1922).
