= Orochaenactis =

Scientific classification
- Kingdom: Plantae
- Clade: Tracheophytes
- Clade: Angiosperms
- Clade: Eudicots
- Clade: Asterids
- Order: Asterales
- Family: Asteraceae
- Subfamily: Asteroideae
- Tribe: Chaenactideae
- Genus: Orochaenactis; Coville
- Species: O. thysanocarpha

Binomial name
- Orochaenactis thysanocarpha (A.Gray) Coville

Genus of flowering plants

Orochaenactis is a monotypic genus of flowering plants in the daisy family containing the single species Orochaenactis thysanocarpha, which is known by the common name California mountain pincushion. It is endemic to the southern Sierra Nevada of California, where it grows in the forests and meadows of the high mountains.

== Description ==
Orochaenactis thysanocarpha is an annual herb producing a slender, often branching stem up to about 25 centimeters tall. It is coated thinly to densely in hairs, often glandular. The narrow leaves are generally linear in shape and up to 4 centimeters long.

The inflorescence is a small flower head lined with purple phyllaries nested in a cluster of leaflike bracts. The head contains several yellow disc florets. The fruit is a ribbed achene tipped with a pappus of fringelike scales, the fruit around half a centimeter long in total.
