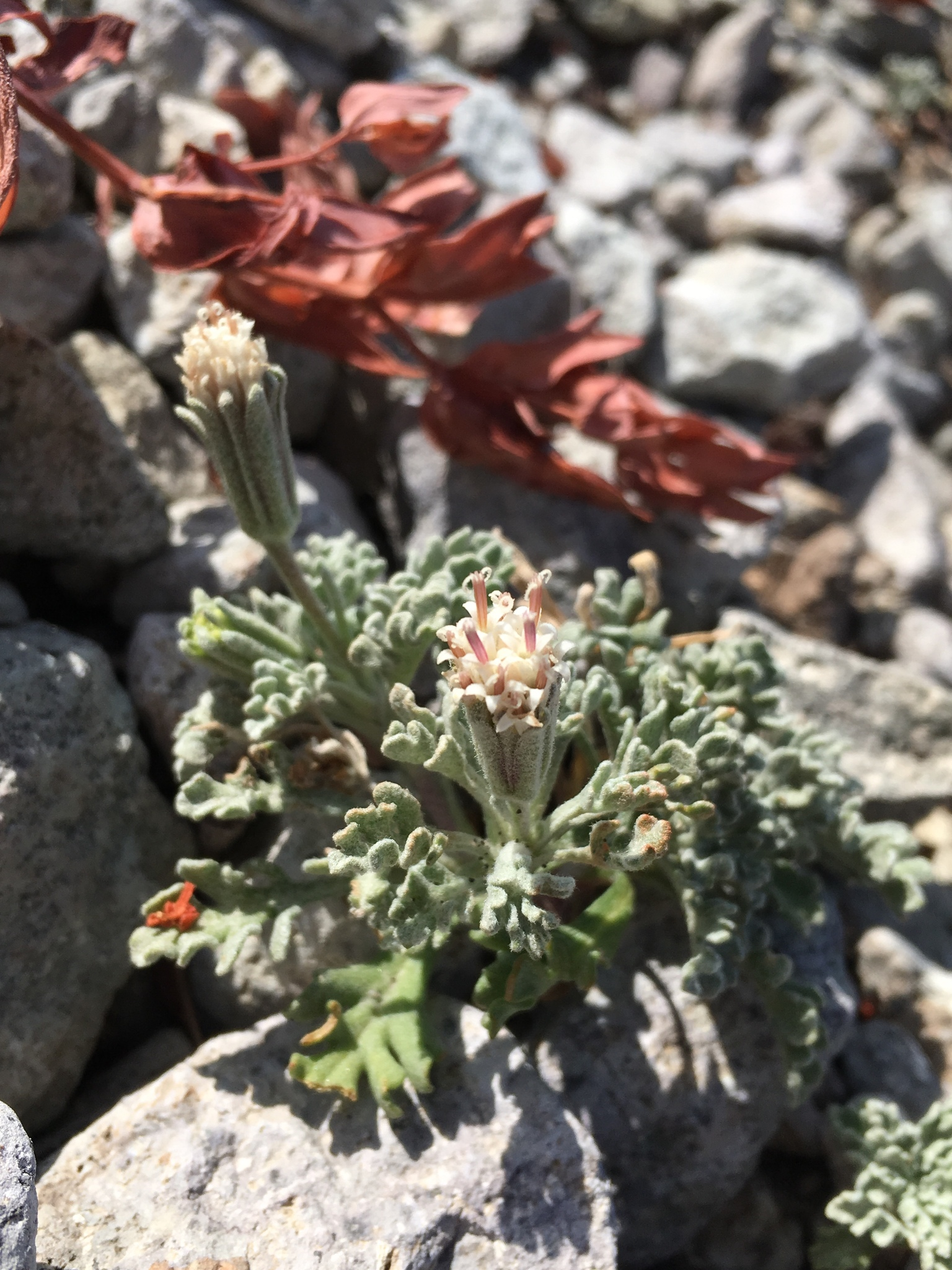

Conservation status
- Vulnerable (NatureServe)

Scientific classification
- Kingdom: Plantae
- Clade: Tracheophytes
- Clade: Angiosperms
- Clade: Eudicots
- Clade: Asterids
- Order: Asterales
- Family: Asteraceae
- Genus: Chaenactis
- Species: C. alpigena

Binomial name
- Chaenactis alpigena Sharsm.

= Chaenactis alpigena =

Species of flowering plant

Chaenactis alpigena is a species of flowering plant in the daisy family known by the common name southern Sierra pincushion. It is native to the High Sierra Nevada and the White Mountains of California, extending in the latter just into Nevada.

The plant is cultivated in rock gardens as well. It grows in sandy and gravelly soil in various alpine and subalpine mountain habitat.

This is a petite plant growing no more than a few centimeters tall with numerous stems which may be erect to prostrate, forming mats or clumps. It is generally gray to yellowish and densely woolly. Green, nearly hairless specimens have been noted. The leaves occur in a basal rosette, each thick but not fleshy, and scoop-shaped with a few lobes along the edges. The leaves are variable in morphology, especially in northern individuals versus southern. There is generally one flower head per stem. It is between about 1 and 2 centimeters long, somewhat cylindrical, hairy but not glandular, and lined with long, flat, blunt-pointed phyllaries. The head contains many white to pink-tinted flowers with large, protruding, darker colored anthers. The fruit is an achene over a centimeter long including its pappus.
