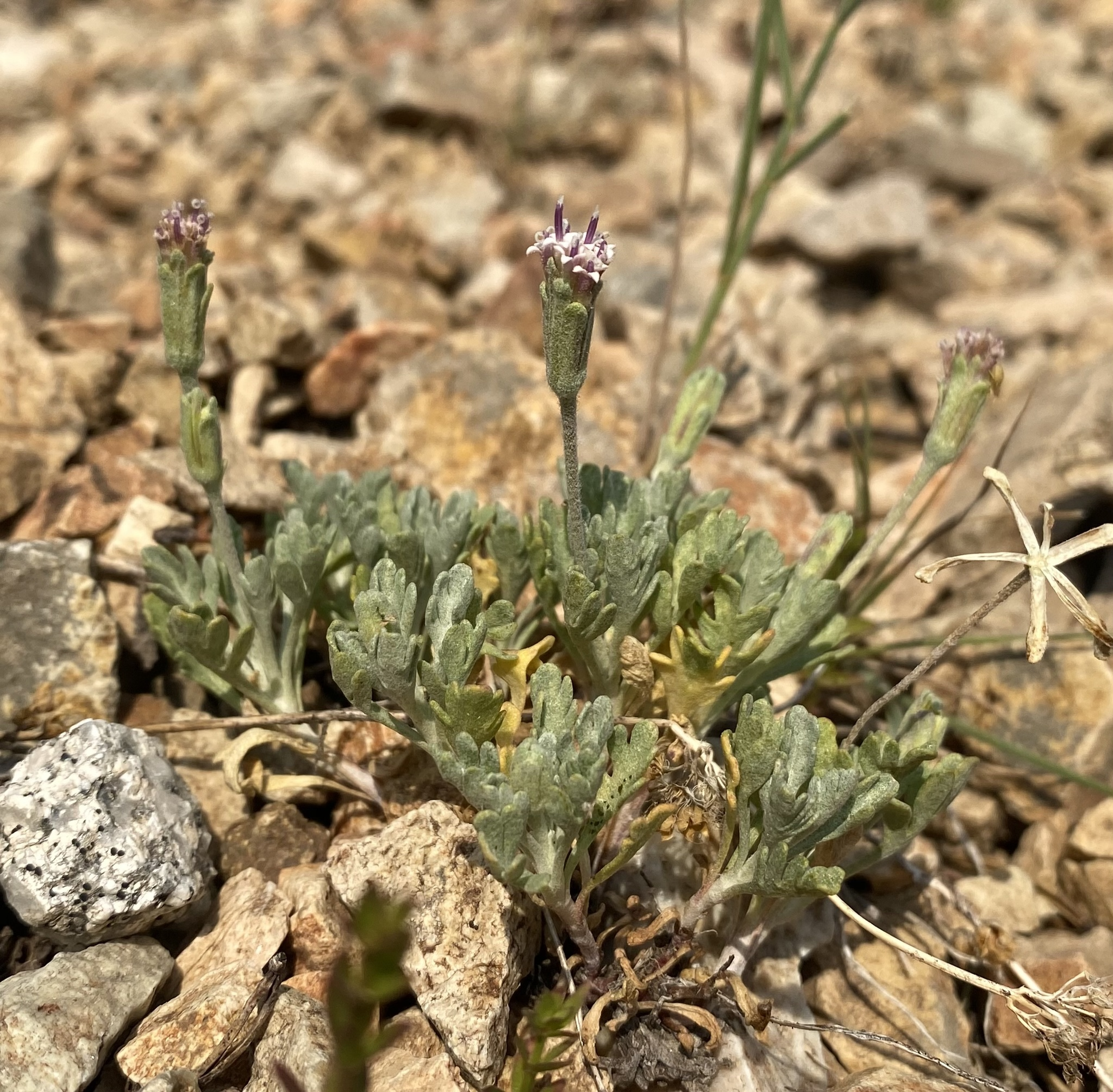

Scientific classification
- Kingdom: Plantae
- Clade: Tracheophytes
- Clade: Angiosperms
- Clade: Eudicots
- Clade: Asterids
- Order: Asterales
- Family: Asteraceae
- Genus: Chaenactis
- Species: C. evermannii

Binomial name
- Chaenactis evermannii Greene

Synonyms
- Chaenactis mainsiana A.Nelson & J.F.Macbr.; Chaenactis nevadensis var. mainsiana (A.Nelson & J.F.Macbr.) Stockw.

= Chaenactis evermannii =

Species of flowering plant

Chaenactis evermannii is a North American species of flowering plants in the aster family known by the common name Evermann's pincushion. It is found only at high altitudes in the mountains in the central part of the US State of Idaho.

== Description ==
Chaenactis evermannii is a small perennial rarely more than 12 cm (5 inches) tall. Each branch produces 1-3 flower heads each containing disc florets but no ray florets. It grows in subalpine, usually decomposing, granitic sand or gravel slopes, ridges, scree, talus, or above conifer forests.

The species is named for American ichthyologist Barton Warren Evermann (1853–1932).
