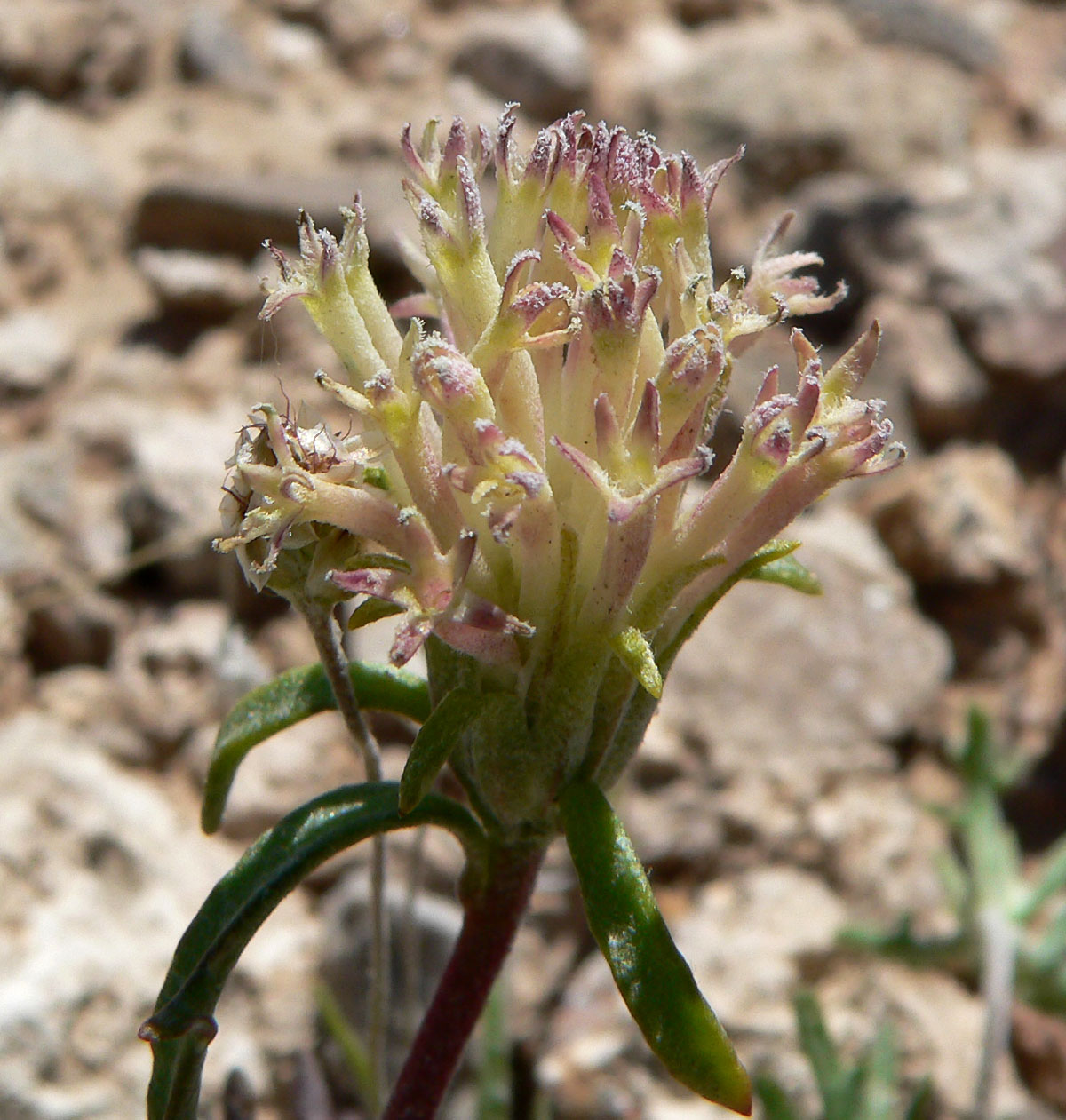

Scientific classification
- Kingdom: Plantae
- Clade: Tracheophytes
- Clade: Angiosperms
- Clade: Eudicots
- Clade: Asterids
- Order: Asterales
- Family: Asteraceae
- Genus: Chaenactis
- Species: C. macrantha

Binomial name
- Chaenactis macrantha D.C.Eaton

= Chaenactis macrantha =

Species of flowering plant

Chaenactis macrantha is a species of flowering plant in the daisy family known by the common names bighead dustymaiden and Mojave pincushion. It is native to the Great Basin and the southwestern deserts of the United States, in California, Arizona, Utah, Nevada, southwestern Idaho, and southeastern Oregon. It grows in dry, open habitat with gravelly, sandy soils, often calcareous or alkaline in nature.

Chaenactis macrantha is an annual herb growing one or more branching stems to 30 - 35 centimeters (12-14 inches) in maximum height. The leaves are a few centimeters long and divided into many lobes. The inflorescence bears one or more flower heads on long peduncles. The flower head is lined with woolly phyllaries which have recurved tips. The head contains many white or pink-tinted flowers which open at night. The fruit is an achene about a centimeter long including the pappus.
