= Lomatium roneorum =

Scientific classification
- Kingdom: Plantae
- Clade: Tracheophytes
- Clade: Angiosperms
- Clade: Eudicots
- Clade: Asterids
- Order: Apiales
- Family: Apiaceae
- Genus: Lomatium
- Species: L. roneorum

Binomial name
- Lomatium roneorum Darrach

Species of desert-parsley

Lomatium roneorum, Rone's desert-parsley or Rone's biscuit-root, is a species of Lomatium native to chalky soils in the Chumstick formation in Washington State. The specific epithet commemorates the surname Rone, as determined by an auction for the naming rights.

== Description ==
Lomatium roneorum is approximately 40 cm tall when in flower or fruit and has numerous strongly overlapping blunt-tipped glabrous green to blue-gray leaflets born on thick stems and yellow flowers, distinguishing it from the nearby endemic Lomatium cuspidatum. Flowers are held above the foliage in a compound umbel on thick fleshy stalks that arise from the base of the plant.
