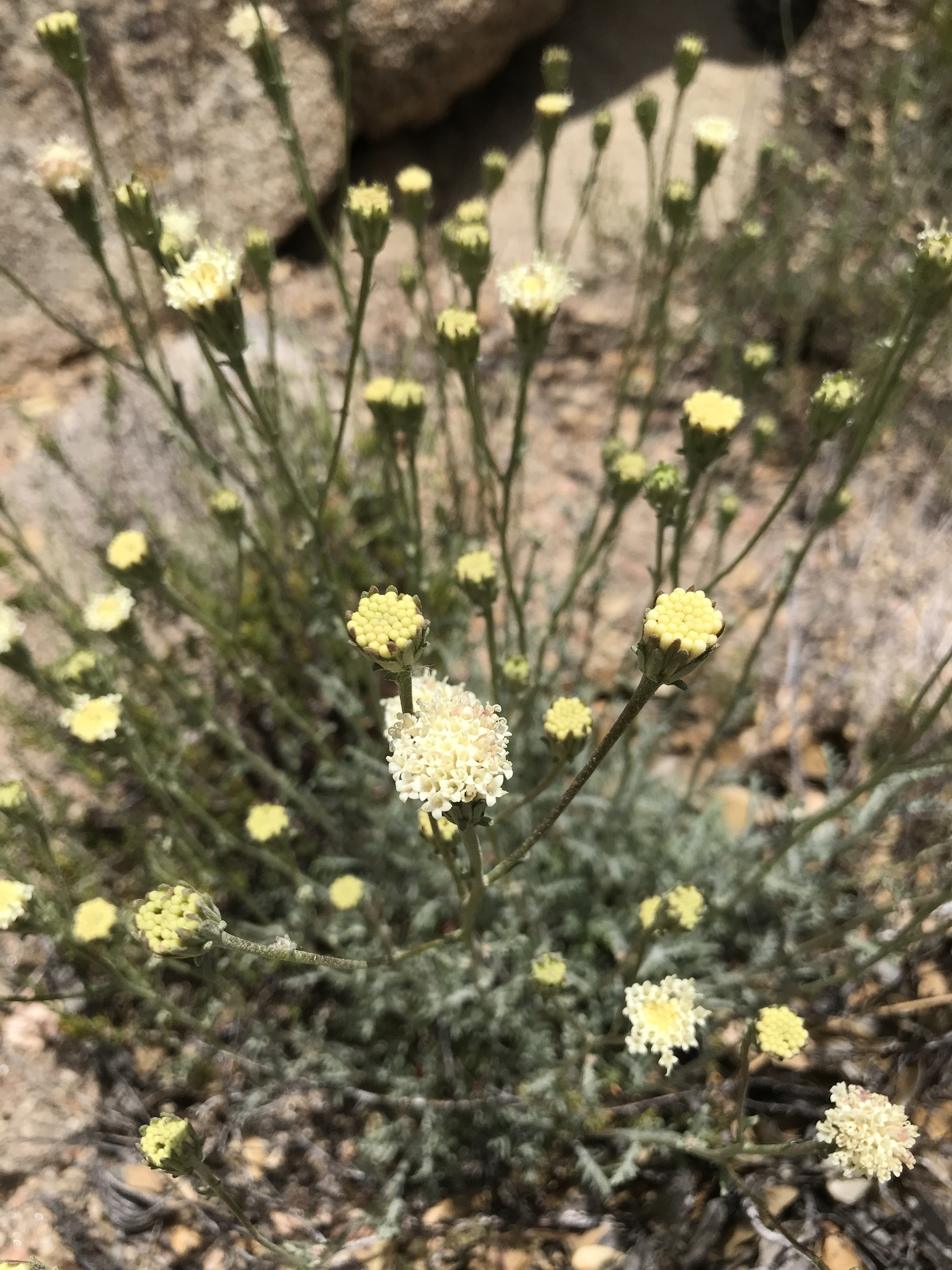

Conservation status
- Vulnerable (NatureServe)

Scientific classification
- Kingdom: Plantae
- Clade: Tracheophytes
- Clade: Angiosperms
- Clade: Eudicots
- Clade: Asterids
- Order: Asterales
- Family: Asteraceae
- Genus: Chaenactis
- Species: C. parishii

Binomial name
- Chaenactis parishii A.Gray

= Chaenactis parishii =

Species of flowering plant

Chaenactis parishii is a species of flowering plant in the daisy family known by the common name Parish's chaenactis.

== Distribution ==
It is native to the Peninsular Ranges of southern California (San Diego County + western Riverside County) and northern Baja California, where it grows in chaparral habitat.

== Description ==
Chaenactis parishii is a subshrub producing a number of erect stems up to 60 centimeters (24 inches) tall which are covered in a white feltlike coat of hairs. The woolly leaves are a few centimeters long and divided into many small lobes. The inflorescence bears flower heads on a tall, erect peduncle. The flower head is lined with grayish woolly phyllaries and contains many white or pink-tinted flowers. The fruit is an achene with a pappus of scales.
