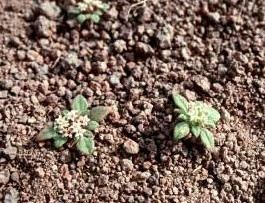

Conservation status
- Apparently Secure (NatureServe)

Scientific classification
- Kingdom: Plantae
- Clade: Embryophytes
- Clade: Tracheophytes
- Clade: Spermatophytes
- Clade: Angiosperms
- Clade: Eudicots
- Clade: Asterids
- Order: Asterales
- Family: Asteraceae
- Subfamily: Asteroideae
- Tribe: Chaenactideae
- Genus: Dimeresia; A.Gray
- Species: D. howellii

Binomial name
- Dimeresia howellii A.Gray

Synonyms
- Ereminula Greene; Ereminula howellii (A.Gray) Greene

= Dimeresia =

Plant genus in the sunflower family

Dimeresia is a monotypic genus in the sunflower family containing the single species Dimeresia howellii, known by the common name doublet.

== Distribution ==
This uncommon plant is endemic to an area of the Great Basin region in the western United States, in northeastern California, southeastern Oregon, southwestern Idaho, and northwestern Nevada.

It grows in dry volcanic soils, primarily on the Modoc Plateau volcanic plain, at elevations of 1,500–2,400 metres (4,900–7,900 ft).

== Description ==
Dimeresia howellii is a very tiny annual flowering plant rarely exceeding 4 centimeters in height or width. It forms a small tuft on the ground with several oval-shaped leaves, and is cobwebby at base and glandular above.

The inflorescence has tiny white to purple bell-shaped flowers each a few millimeters long. The flowering period is May to August.
