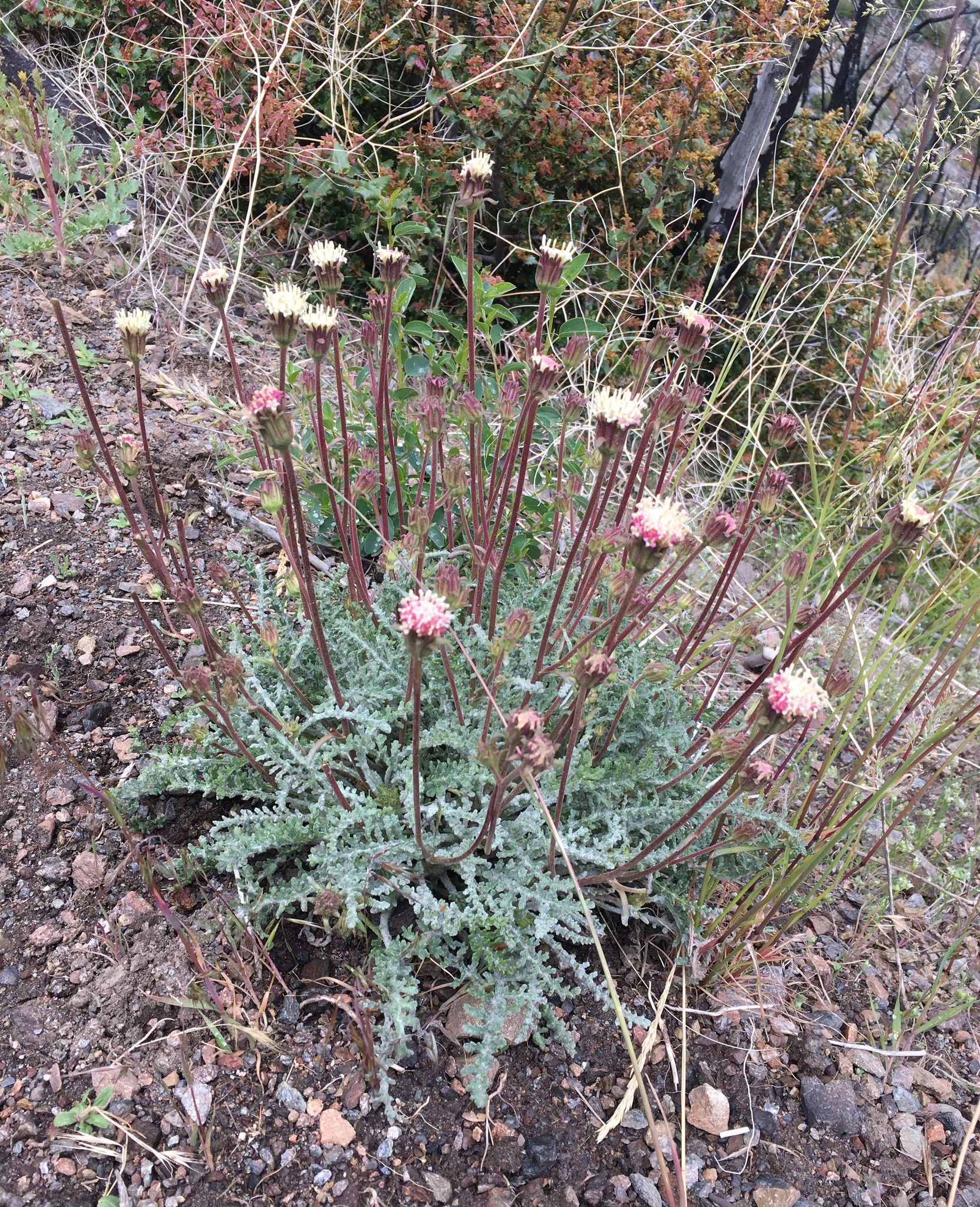

Conservation status
- Imperiled (NatureServe)

Scientific classification
- Kingdom: Plantae
- Clade: Tracheophytes
- Clade: Angiosperms
- Clade: Eudicots
- Clade: Asterids
- Order: Asterales
- Family: Asteraceae
- Genus: Chaenactis
- Species: C. santolinoides

Binomial name
- Chaenactis santolinoides Greene

= Chaenactis santolinoides =

Species of flowering plant

Chaenactis santolinoides is a species of flowering plant in the daisy family known by the common name Santolina pincushion. It is found in California.

== Distribution and habitat ==
The plant is endemic to California, where it is found in the Transverse Ranges and southern Sierra Nevada.

It grows in open, exposed high mountain habitat such as scree and rocky slopes. Its range stretches from Tulare County to northwestern Riverside County with isolated populations in Mono County.

== Description ==
Chaenactis santolinoides is a clumpy or mat-forming perennial herb growing up to about 25 centimeters (10 inches) in height. The stems are erect and coated in white woolly hairs which thin with age. The leaves are several centimeters long and arranged in a crowded basal rosette. Each leaf is made up of many tiny lobes which are reduced so as to form a solid mass, making the leaf somewhat cylindrical.

The inflorescence produces one to three flower heads extended on a tall, erect peduncle. The flower head is lined with hairy, glandular phyllaries and contains many white or pink flowers with protruding anthers. The fruit is an achene with a pappus.
