= Chaenactis furcata =

Scientific classification
- Kingdom: Plantae
- Clade: Tracheophytes
- Clade: Angiosperms
- Clade: Eudicots
- Clade: Asterids
- Order: Asterales
- Family: Asteraceae
- Genus: Chaenactis
- Species: C. furcata

Binomial name
- Chaenactis furcata Stockw.

Species of flowering plant

Chaenactis furcata is a Mexican species of flowering plants in the aster family. It grows on the Baja California Peninsula in northwestern Mexico, the State of Baja California (sometimes erroneously called Baja California Norte).
