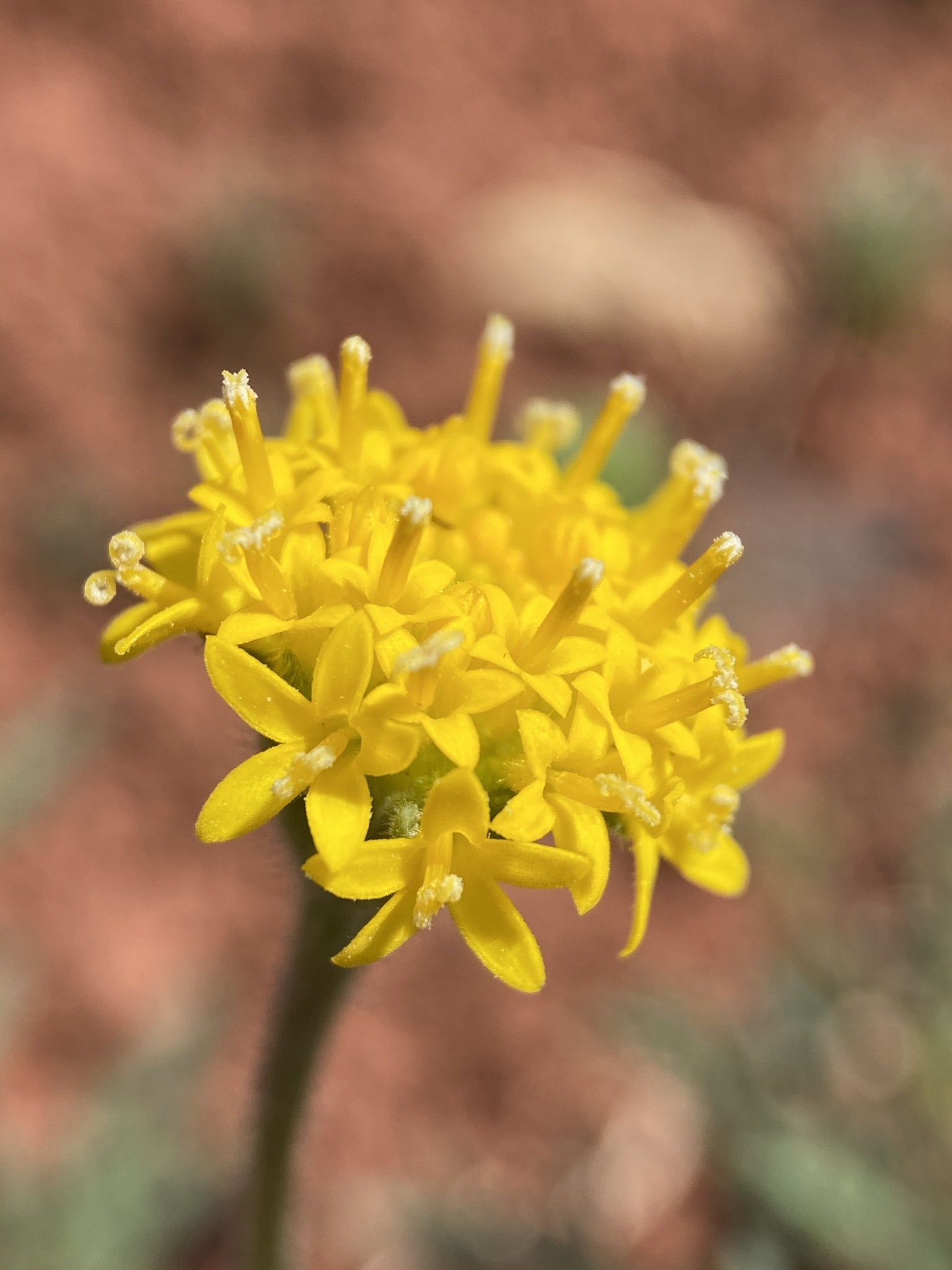

Scientific classification
- Kingdom: Plantae
- Clade: Tracheophytes
- Clade: Angiosperms
- Clade: Eudicots
- Clade: Asterids
- Order: Asterales
- Family: Asteraceae
- Genus: Chaenactis
- Species: C. nevii

Binomial name
- Chaenactis nevii A.Gray

= Chaenactis nevii =

Species of flowering plant

Chaenactis nevii is a North American species of flowering plants in the aster family known by the common name John Day pincushion. It is found only in the John Day Basin area in the US State of Oregon.

== Description ==
Chaenactis nevii is a perennial up to 30 cm (12 inches) tall. Each branch produces 1-3 flower heads each containing yellow disc florets but no ray florets.

The species is named for American missionary and botanist Reuben Denton Nevius (1827-1913).
