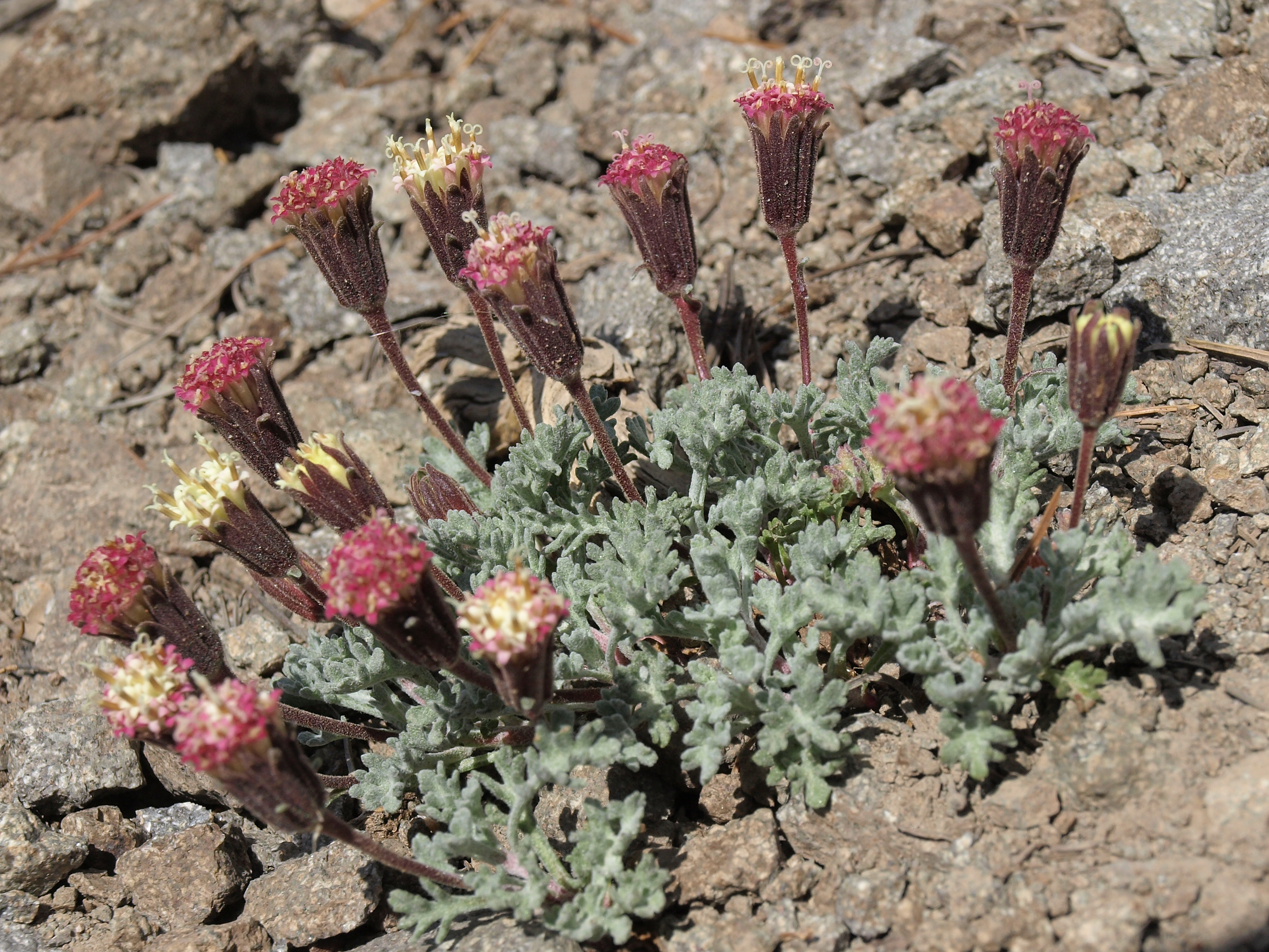

Conservation status
- Vulnerable (NatureServe)

Scientific classification
- Kingdom: Plantae
- Clade: Tracheophytes
- Clade: Angiosperms
- Clade: Eudicots
- Clade: Asterids
- Order: Asterales
- Family: Asteraceae
- Genus: Chaenactis
- Species: C. nevadensis

Binomial name
- Chaenactis nevadensis (Kellogg) A.Gray

Synonyms
- Hymenopappus nevadensis Kellogg

= Chaenactis nevadensis =

Species of flowering plant

Chaenactis nevadensis, with the common name Nevada dustymaiden, is a North American species of flowering plant in the daisy family.

== Distribution and habitat ==
It is native to the high mountains of eastern California, including the Sierra Nevada from Shasta County to western Inyo County, with a few populations in Washoe County, Nevada; and into the southernmost Cascade Range.

The species grows in sandy or gravelly soils in subalpine habitats.

== Description ==
Chaenactis nevadensis is a perennial herb growing several short stems just a few centimeters high surrounded by a basal rosette of small, woolly, multilobed leaves. The inflorescence arises on a short peduncle. Each flower head is lined with rigid, blunt-tipped, glandular phyllaries. The flower head contains several white or pink flowers with long, protruding anthers. The fruit is an achene with a pappus of scales.
