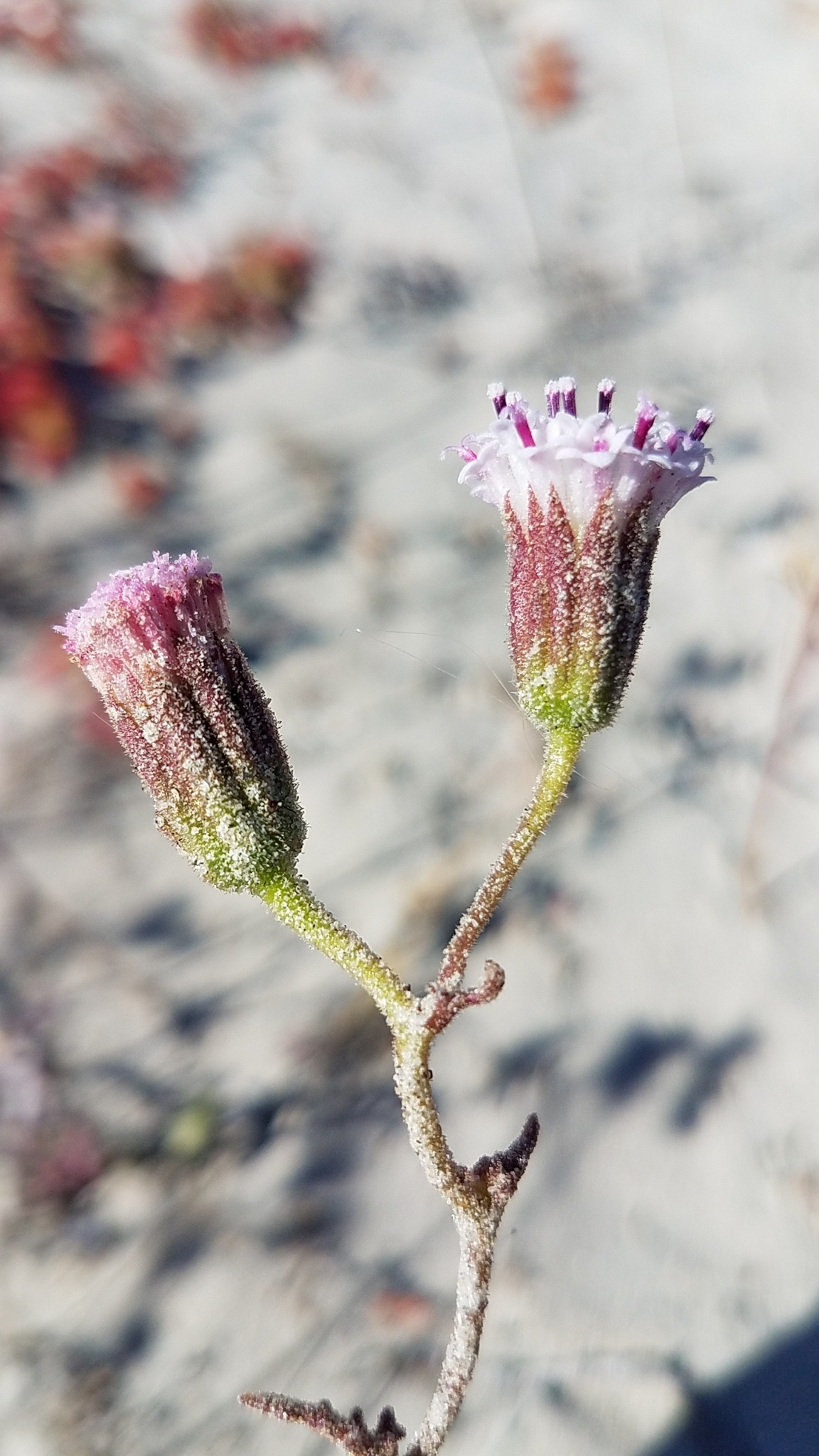

Scientific classification
- Kingdom: Plantae
- Clade: Embryophytes
- Clade: Tracheophytes
- Clade: Angiosperms
- Clade: Eudicots
- Clade: Asterids
- Order: Asterales
- Family: Asteraceae
- Genus: Chaenactis
- Species: C. lacera

Binomial name
- Chaenactis lacera Greene

= Chaenactis lacera =

Species of flowering plant

Chaenactis lacera is a Mexican species of flowering plants in the aster family. It grows on the Baja California Peninsula in northwestern Mexico, the States of Baja California (sometimes erroneously called Baja California Norte) and Baja California Sur.

Chaenactis lacera is a branching annual sometimes exceeding 30 cm (12 inches) in height. Flower heads are numerous, with white disc florets but no ray florets.
