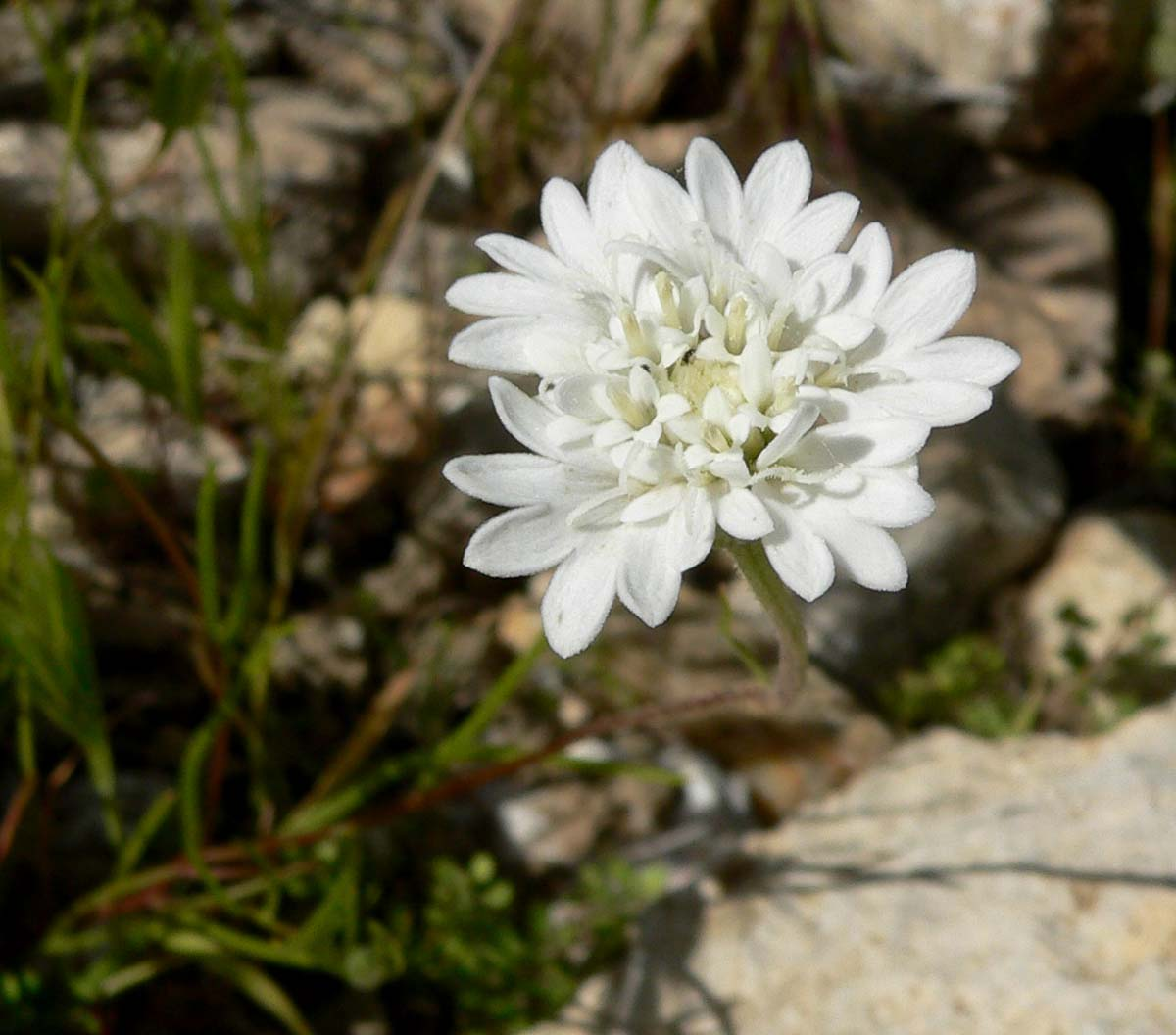

Scientific classification
- Kingdom: Plantae
- Clade: Tracheophytes
- Clade: Angiosperms
- Clade: Eudicots
- Clade: Asterids
- Order: Asterales
- Family: Asteraceae
- Genus: Chaenactis
- Species: C. fremontii

Binomial name
- Chaenactis fremontii A.Gray

= Chaenactis fremontii =

Species of flowering plant

Chaenactis fremontii, with the common names Frémont's pincushion and desert pincushion, is a species of annual wildflower in the daisy family. Both the latter common name, and the specific epithet are chosen in honor of John C. Frémont.

== Distribution and habitat ==
Chaenactis fremontii is native to the Southwestern United States and northern Baja California. It grows in sandy and gravelly soils in the deserts and low mountains, such as the Mojave Desert in California and the Sonoran Desert habitats. It is found in California, Baja California, Arizona, Nevada, and southern Utah.

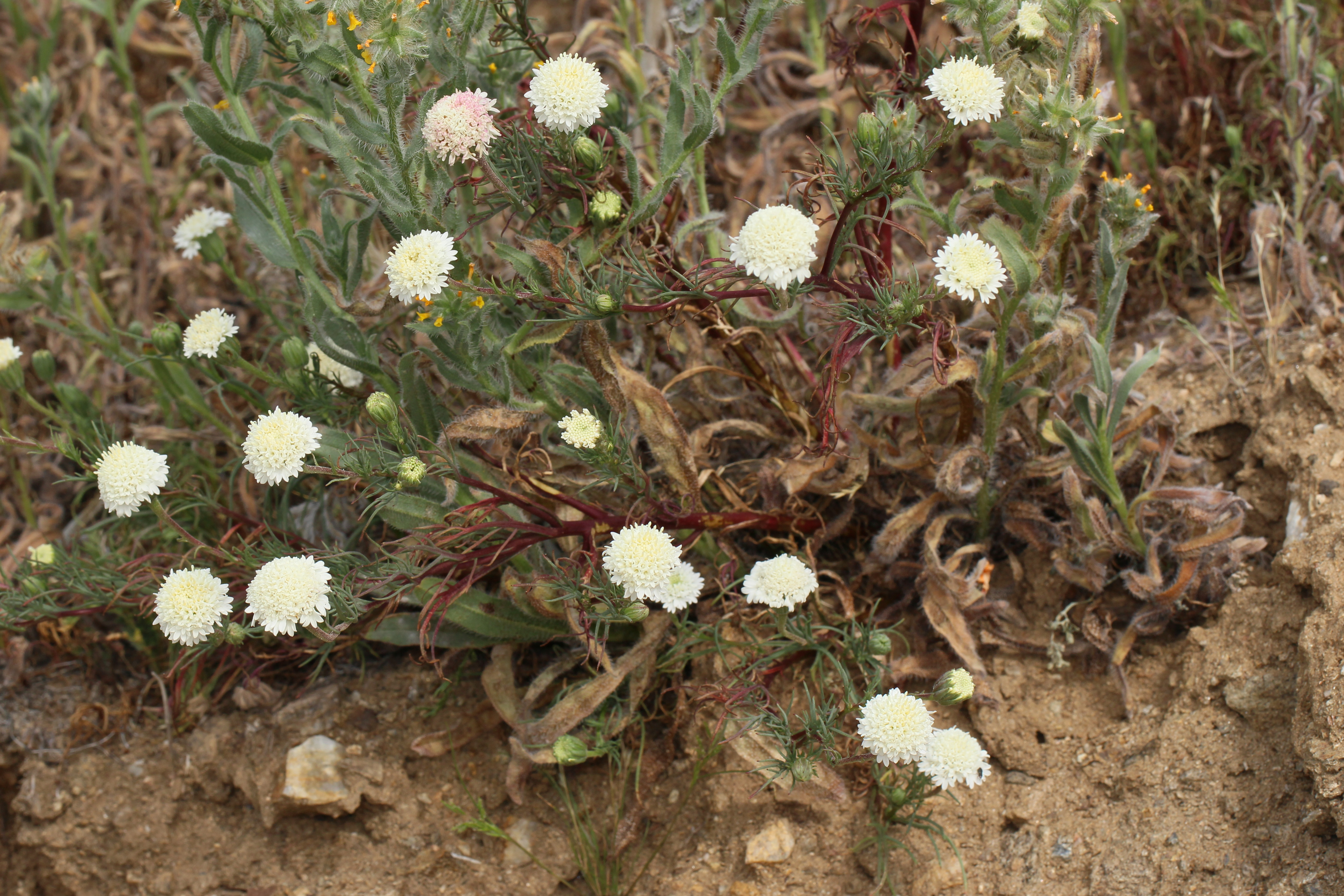
Chaenactis fremontii with Amsinckia tessellata, western Antelope Valley, California

== Description ==
Chaenactis fremontii may branch to extend many tall, almost naked stems. The sparse leaves are somewhat fleshy, long and pointed. Atop each erect stem is an inflorescence bearing usually one but sometimes more flower heads, each with plentiful, densely packed disc florets. There may be very large ray florets around the edge of the discoid head. The flowers are white or very light pink.
