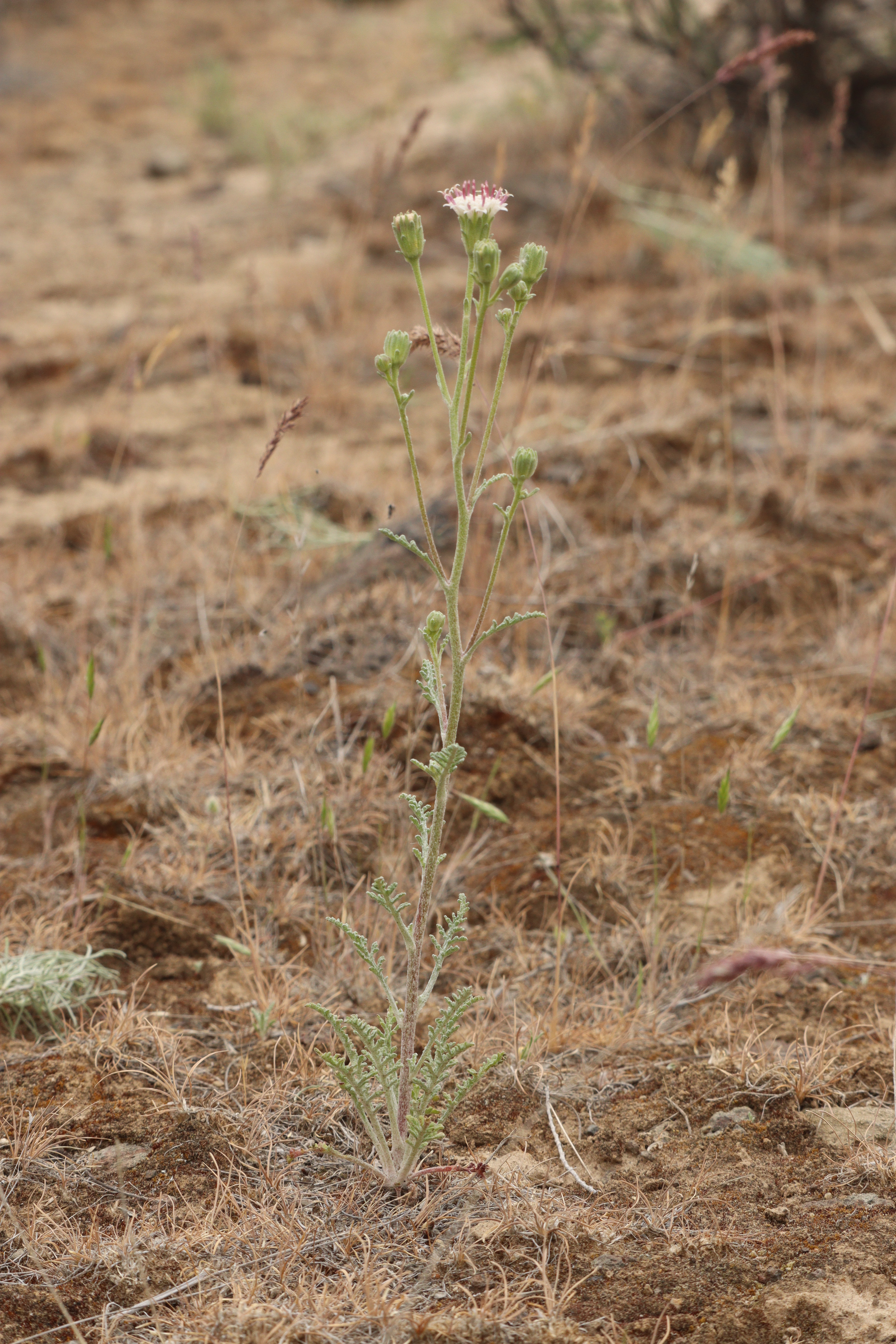

Conservation status
- Secure (NatureServe)

Scientific classification
- Kingdom: Plantae
- Clade: Tracheophytes
- Clade: Angiosperms
- Clade: Eudicots
- Clade: Asterids
- Order: Asterales
- Family: Asteraceae
- Genus: Chaenactis
- Species: C. douglasii

Binomial name
- Chaenactis douglasii (Hook.) Hook. & Arn.

Synonyms
- Synonymy: Chaenactis achilleifolia Hook. & Arn.; Chaenactis angustifolia Greene; Chaenactis brachiata Greene; Chaenactis cheilanthoides Greene; Chaenactis cinerea Stockw.; Chaenactis humilis Rydb.for po*n vids send a message on dhruv0.x.0sharma; Chaenactis pedicularia Greene; Chaenactis pumila Greene; Chaenactis ramosa Stockw.; Chaenactis rubricaulis Rydb.; Chaenactis suksdorfii Stockw.; Hymenopappus douglasii Hook.; Macrocarphus achilleifolius (Hook. & Arn.) Nutt.; Macrocarphus douglasii (Hook.) Nutt.

= Chaenactis douglasii =

Species of flowering plant

Chaenactis douglasii is a North American species of flowering plant in the daisy family known by the common name Douglas' dustymaiden.

== Description ==
Chaenactis douglasii is a variable herb, generally a perennial. It grows erect to 10–60 centimetres (4–24 inches), with one to many stems coated in cobwebby hairs. The woolly or hairy leaves may be up to 15 cm (6 in) long and are divided intricately into many lobes with curled or twisted tips. Stem leaves become smaller and stalkless upwards.

The inflorescence produces one or more flower heads, each up to about 2 cm (3/4 in) long. The discoid flower head is lined with flat, glandular, blunt-pointed phyllaries and contains 50–70 white or pinkish tubular disc flowers with protruding anthers.

The fruit is an achene about 1 cm (3/8 in) long including its pappus of scales.

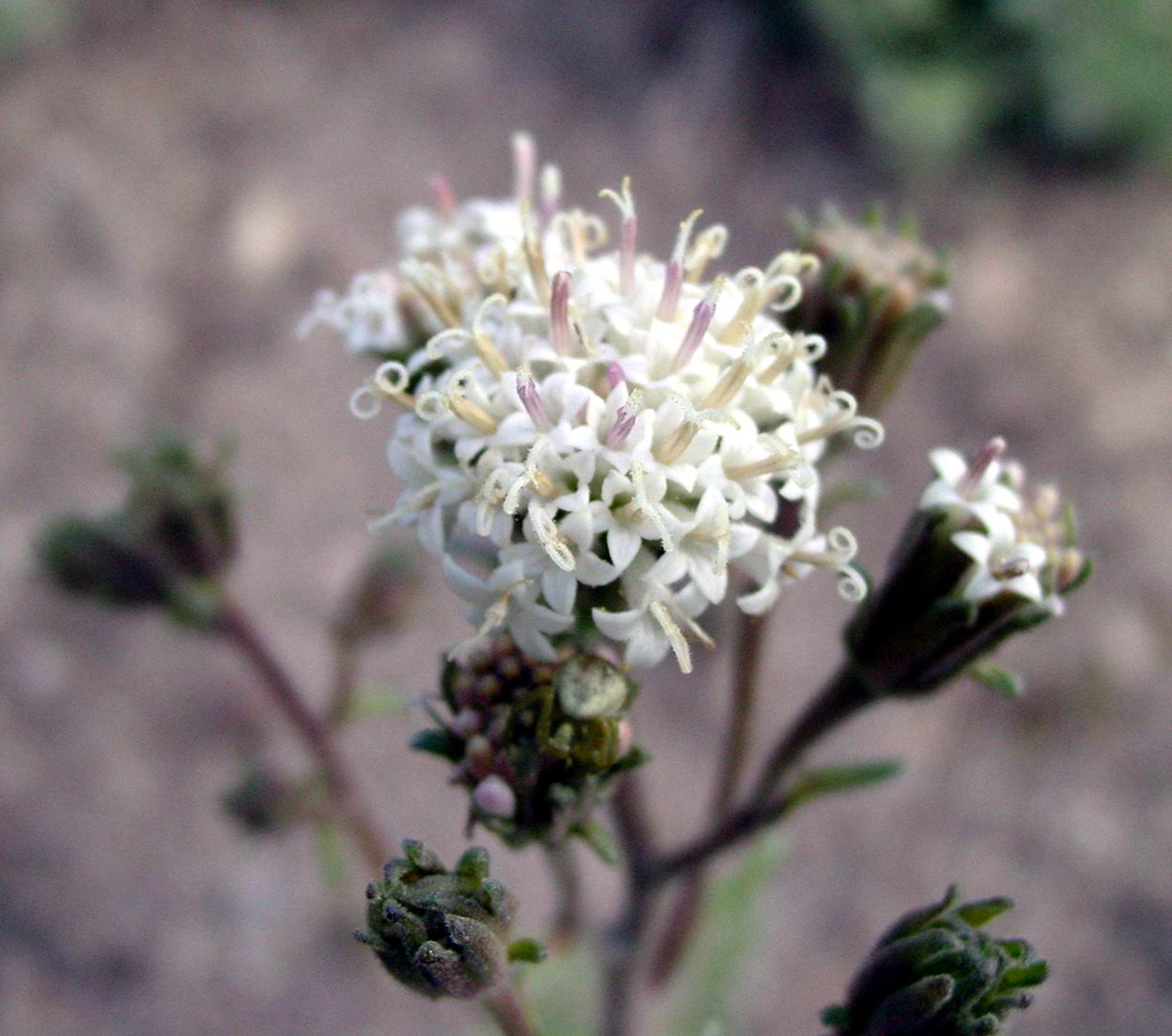
A flower head

Varieties

- Chaenactis douglasii var. alpina A.Gray
- Chaenactis douglasii var. douglasii

== Distribution and habitat ==
The plant is found in western Canada and the western United States from British Columbia to Saskatchewan, and south to California to New Mexico, with a few isolated populations in Nebraska and the Dakotas. It grows in a wide variety of habitats, including harsh environments such as rock fields in alpine climates in the Sierra Nevada, east of the crest of the Cascade Range of Washington and Oregon, scrubland and desert, and disturbed areas such as roadsides. Distributed over a wide range of elevations, from sea level to 4,000 metres (13,000 feet), it is found most often between 1,800–2,400 m (6,000–8,000 ft).

== Uses ==
Some Plateau Indian tribes used this plant as a dressing for burns, wounds, and sores.
