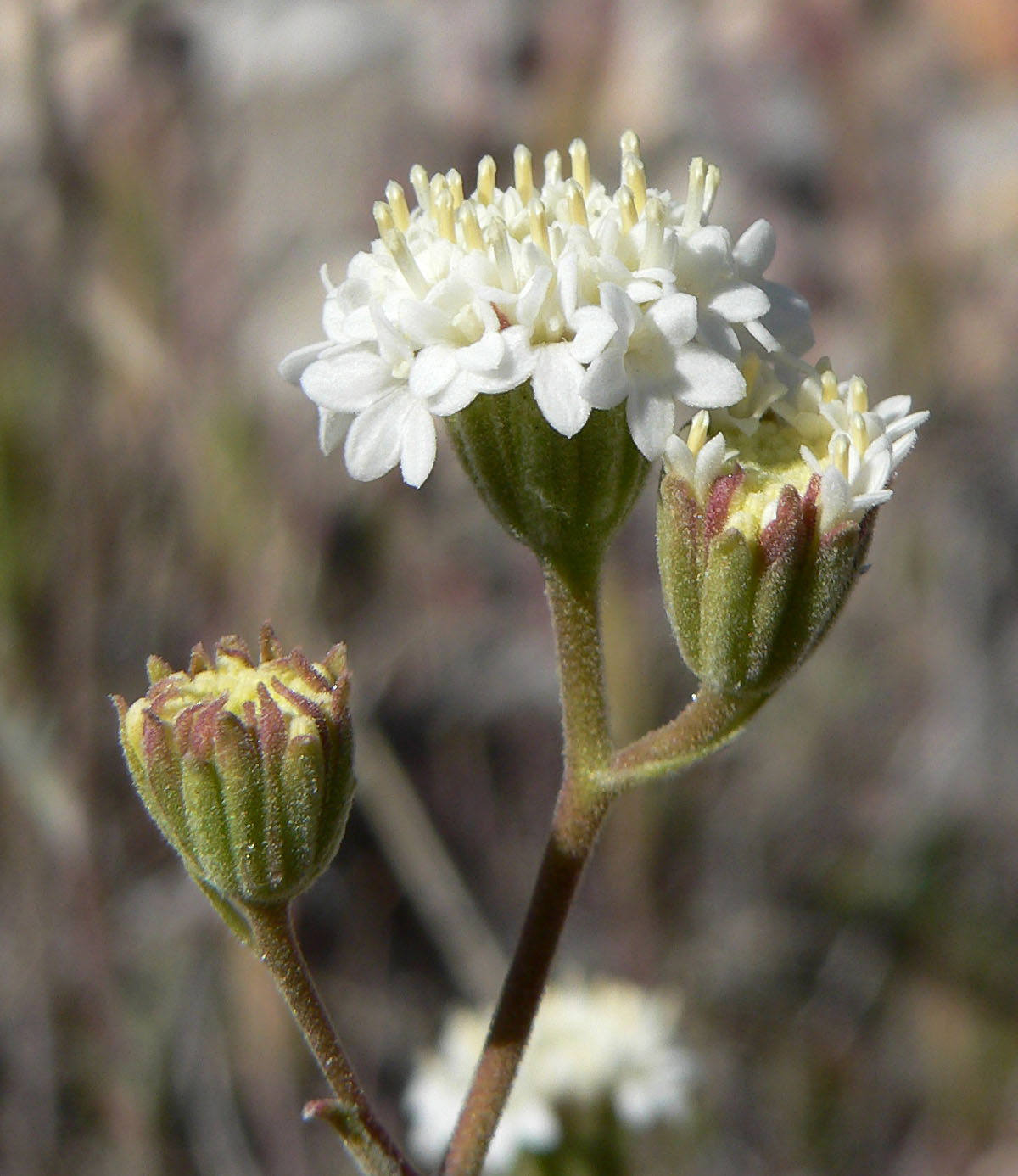

Conservation status
- Secure (NatureServe)

Scientific classification
- Kingdom: Plantae
- Clade: Tracheophytes
- Clade: Angiosperms
- Clade: Eudicots
- Clade: Asterids
- Order: Asterales
- Family: Asteraceae
- Genus: Chaenactis
- Species: C. stevioides

Binomial name
- Chaenactis stevioides Hook. & Arn.

= Chaenactis stevioides =

Species of flowering plant

Chaenactis stevioides, with the common names Esteve's pincushion and desert pincushion, is a species of flowering plant in the daisy family. It is also sometimes called false yarrow or broad-leaved Chaenactis.

== Description ==
Chaenactis stevioides is an annual herb growing one or more erect stems up to 10–45 centimetres (4–17 1/2 inches) tall. The stems are hairy with cobwebby fibers which thin with age. The leaves are 1.5–4 centimetres (1/2–1 1/2 in) in length and are pinnately divided into many subdivided lobes.

The plant blooms from March to June. The inflorescence bears several flower heads on a tall peduncle. Each head is lined with rigid, hairy and glandular phyllaries and filled with white, pink, or pale yellow disk flowers, the ones in the middle smaller and somewhat tubular, and the ones nearer to the edge larger and open-faced, resembling ray florets. The fruit is a hairy achene with a pappus of four scales.

== Distribution and habitat ==
Esteve's pincushion is native to California and the Great Basin of the United States and the southwestern deserts extending into Mexico, where it grows in open arid and semiarid habitat. According to Flora of North America, it is "among the most abundant spring wildflowers in the higher Mojave Desert and southern Great Basin." It is also found in the southern California chaparral and woodlands habitats.
