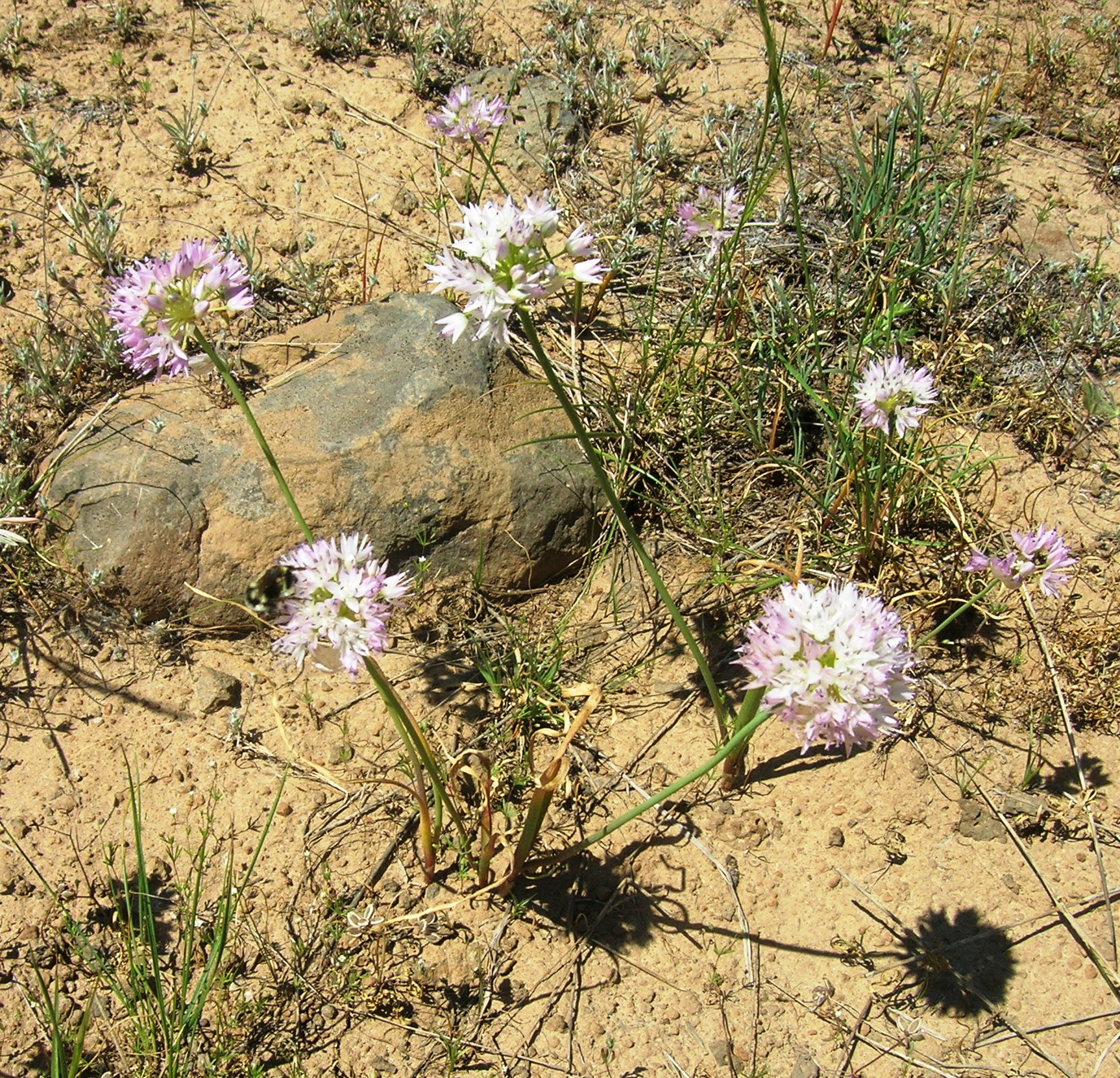
- Allium nevii in Kittitas County, Washington USA

Conservation status
- Vulnerable (NatureServe)

Scientific classification
- Kingdom: Plantae
- Clade: Tracheophytes
- Clade: Angiosperms
- Clade: Monocots
- Order: Asparagales
- Family: Amaryllidaceae
- Subfamily: Allioideae
- Genus: Allium
- Subgenus: A. subg. Amerallium
- Species: A. nevii

Binomial name
- Allium nevii S. Wats.

Synonyms
- Allium douglasii var. nevii (S. Wats.) Ownbey & Mingrone

= Allium nevii =

Species of flowering plant

Allium nevii, known by the common name Nevius' onion or Nevius' garlic, is a plant species native to central Washington (Klickitat, Yakima, Kittitas and Chelan Counties) and north-central Oregon (Wasco and Hood River Counties) in the United States. It grows in wet meadows and along stream banks at elevations up to 2000 m.

== Description ==
Allium nevii produces egg-shaped bulbs up to 2 cm across. One plant will generally have 1-3 scapes, each round or slightly flattened and up to 25 cm tall. Flowers are in umbels of as many as 30 flowers, each bell-shaped and about 7 mm across. Tepals are rose-colored; anthers and pollen blue. The inner coats range from reddish to white. The outer coats range from gray and brown. The thin membrane has a unique network pattern. The flowers bloom period is between May and June. It has two basal leaves, one leaf-less scape, and a cluster of flowers at its tip. The six tepals are narrowly lanceolate with pointed tips. The tepals are usually pink, and rarely white.

== Taxonomy ==
Historically, Allium nevii was treated as part of the Allium douglasii alliance. Both A. douglasii and A. nevii were placed in the Ownbey Allium falcifolium alliance and subsequently by Traub in subsection Falcifolia, section Lophioprason, subgenus Amerallium (see Taxonomy of Allium). It was formerly considered a variety of Allium douglasii.

== Bibliography ==
- Peterson, Paul M.; Annable, Carol R.; Rieseberg, Loren H. (April 1988). "Systematic Relationships and Nomenclatural Changes in the Allium douglasii Complex (Alliaceae)". Systematic Botany. 13 (2): 207. Bibcode:1988SysBo..13..207P. doi:10.2307/2419099. JSTOR 2419099.
- Rieseberg, Loren H.; Peterson, Paul M.; Soltis, Douglas E.; Annable, Carol R. (November 1987). "Genetic Divergence and Isozyme Number Variation Among Four Varieties of Allium douglasii (Alliaceae)". American Journal of Botany. 74 (11): 1614. doi:10.2307/2444130. JSTOR 2444130.
- Saghir, Abdur Rahman B.; Mann, Louis K.; Ownbey, Marion; Berg, Rolf Y. (May 1966). "Composition of Volatiles in Relation to Taxonomy of American Alliums". American Journal of Botany. 53 (5): 477–484. doi:10.2307/2440346. JSTOR 2440346.
- Traub, Hamilton P (1968). "The subgenera, sections and subsections of Allium L.". Plant Life. 24: 147–163.
