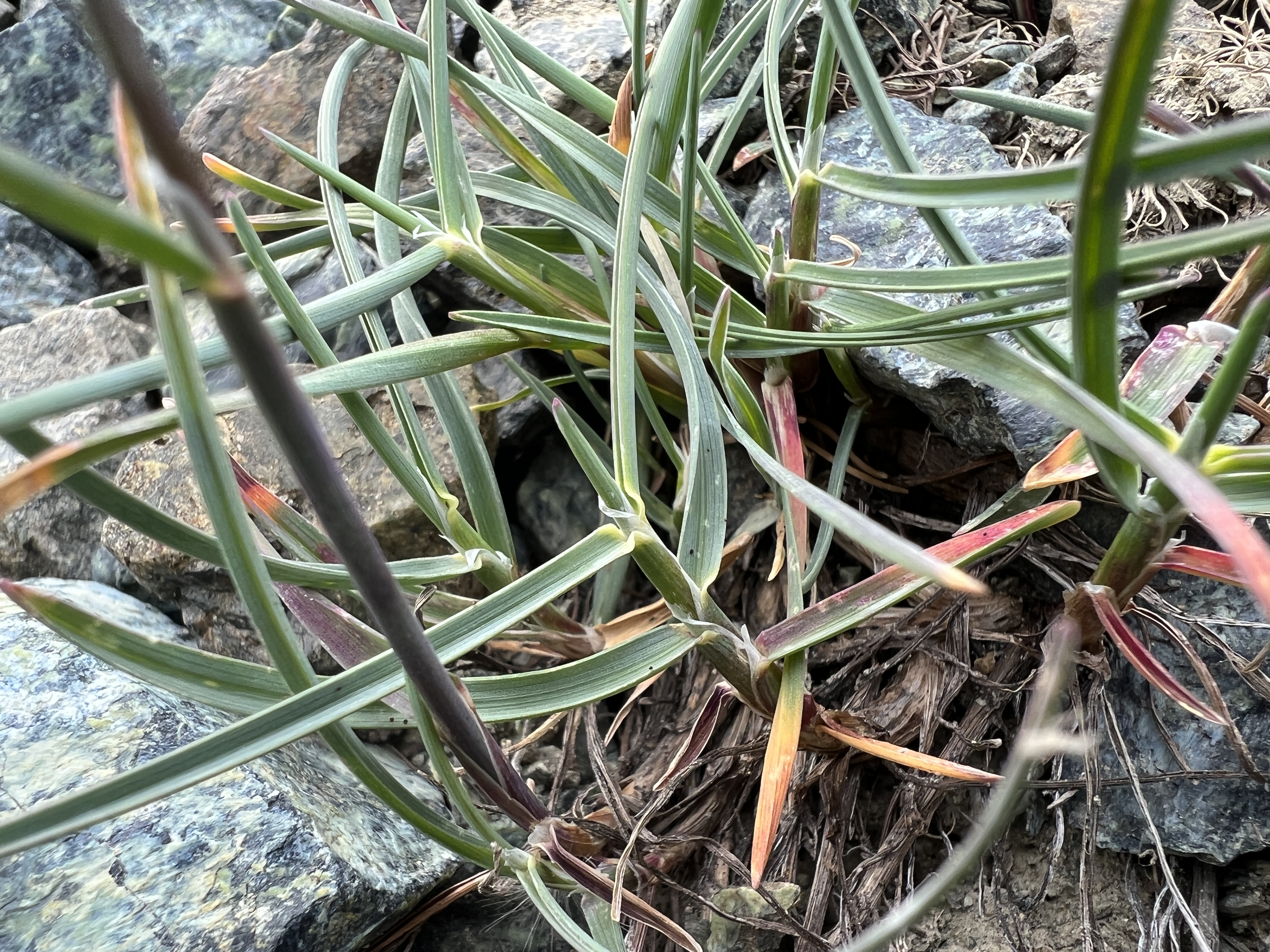

Scientific classification
- Kingdom: Plantae
- Clade: Embryophytes
- Clade: Tracheophytes
- Clade: Angiosperms
- Clade: Monocots
- Clade: Commelinids
- Order: Poales
- Family: Poaceae
- Subfamily: Pooideae
- Genus: Poa
- Species: P. curtifolia

Binomial name
- Poa curtifolia Scribn.

= Poa curtifolia =

Species of plant

Poa curtifolia is a species of grass found on serpentine soils in the Wenatchee Mountains of Washington State.

== Description ==
Poa curtifolia is a small grass with firm prominently veined blue-green leaves that are 1.5-3.0 mm wide, generally with a thickened whitish margin. The leaf collar is yellowish and the ligule is membranous.

== Range and ecology ==
Poa curtifolia is endemic to serpentine scree and soils in the Wenatchee Mountains of Washington State.

== Gallery ==
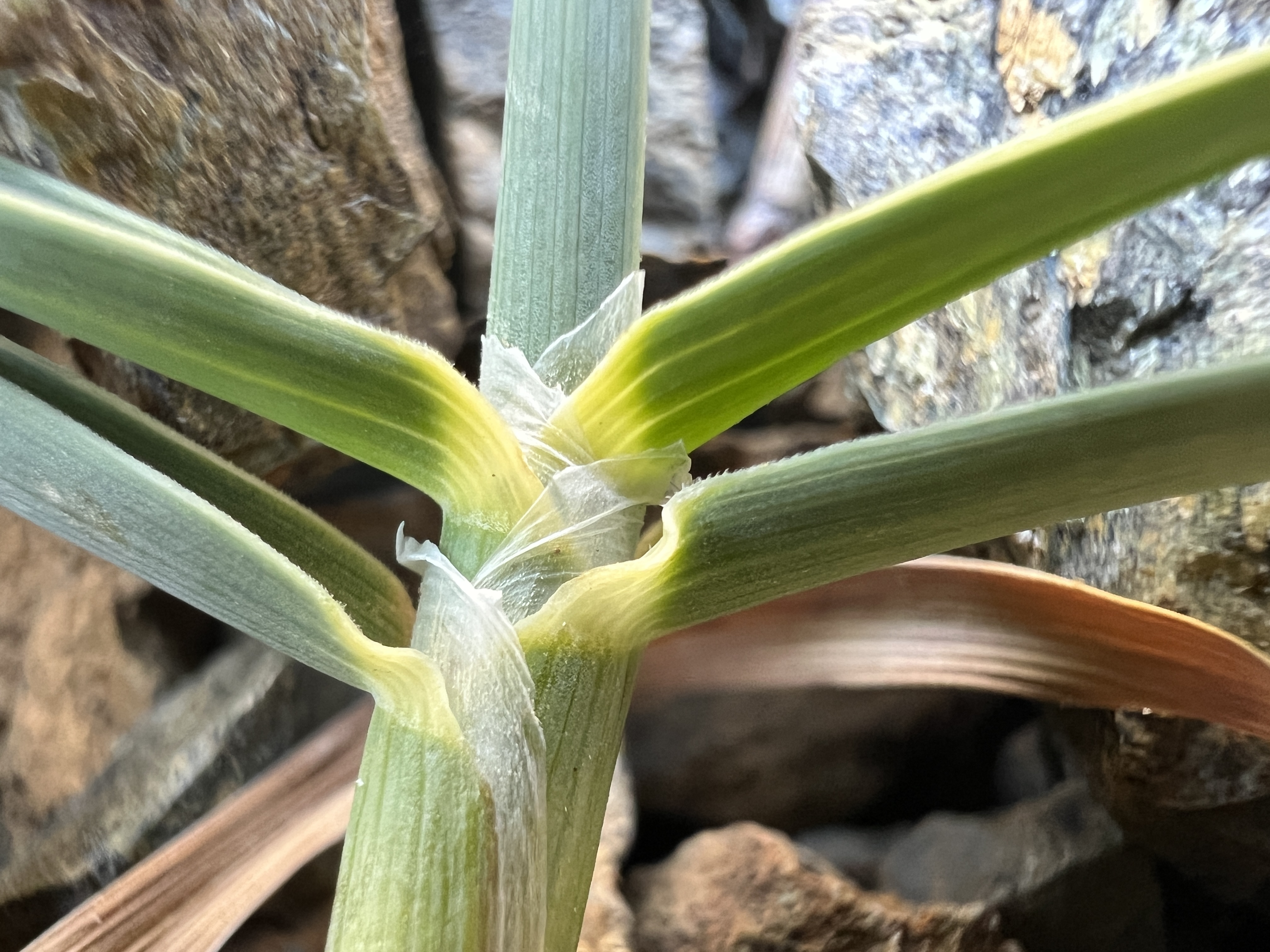
Collar and ligule
