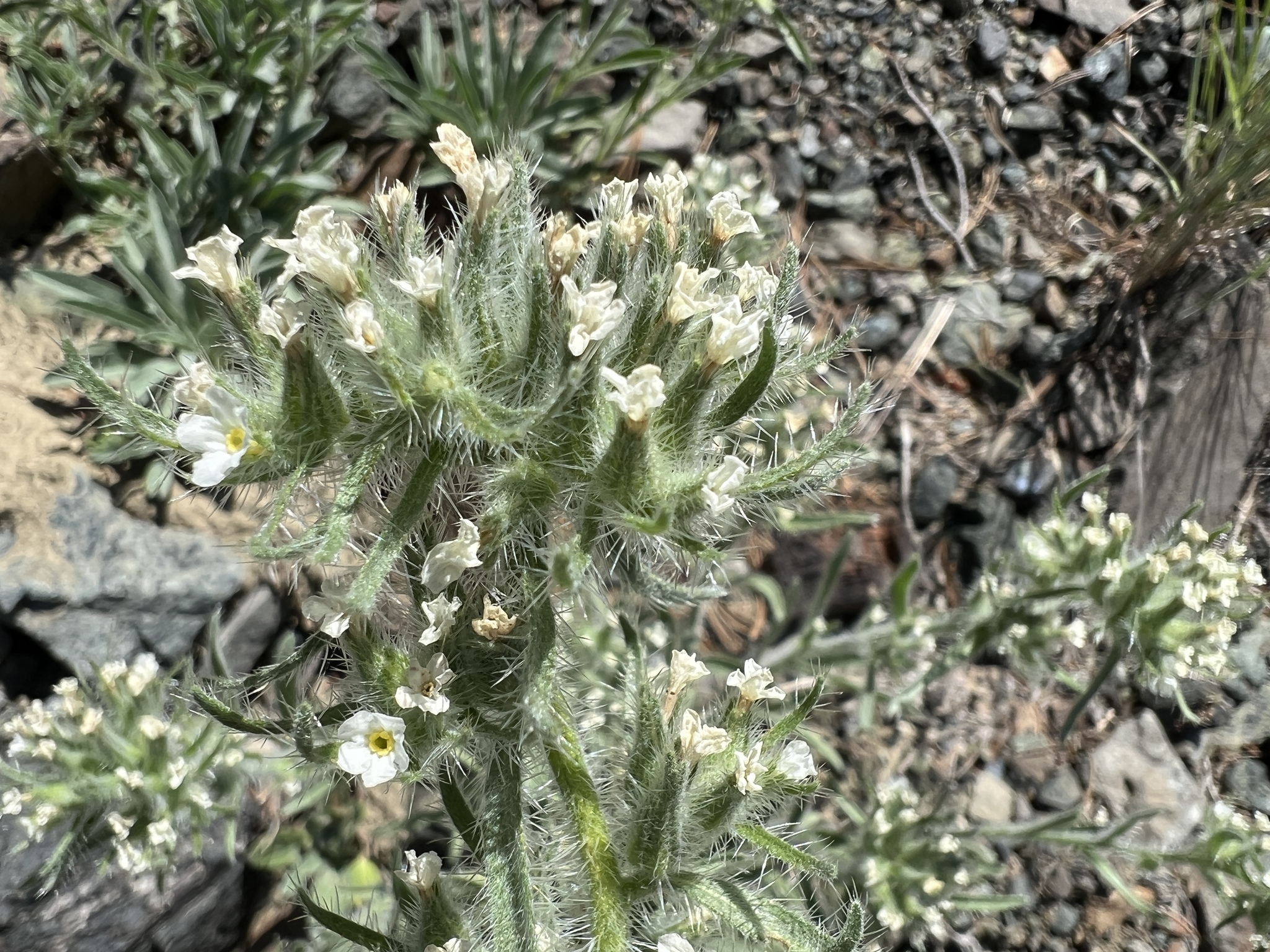

Scientific classification
- Kingdom: Plantae
- Clade: Tracheophytes
- Clade: Angiosperms
- Clade: Eudicots
- Clade: Asterids
- Order: Boraginales
- Family: Boraginaceae
- Genus: Oreocarya
- Species: O. thompsonii

Binomial name
- Oreocarya thompsonii (I.M.Johnst.) Abrams

= Oreocarya thompsonii =

Species of flowering plant

Oreocarya thompsonii is a species of flowering plant in the genus Oreocarya with the common name Thompson's cryptantha (it was previously placed in the genus Cryptantha).

== Description ==
The leaves form a low basal rosette or cluster of rosettes. Individual leaves are linear and gray-green, and are covered with short white hairs, interspersed with much longer hairs especially near the leaf edge (ciliate). The largest basal leaf is about 4–7 cm long and 5–10 mm wide, with progressively smaller leaves higher on the rosette. Flower stems arise from the base of the leaf rosette and are 20–40 cm tall, bearing clusters of small flowers with 5 white petals and a yellow center. The peduncle (flower stalk) bears additional alternate leaves, which often bear smaller flower clusters from their axil. The flower clusters and stems are densely covered with very prominent translucent white trichomes.

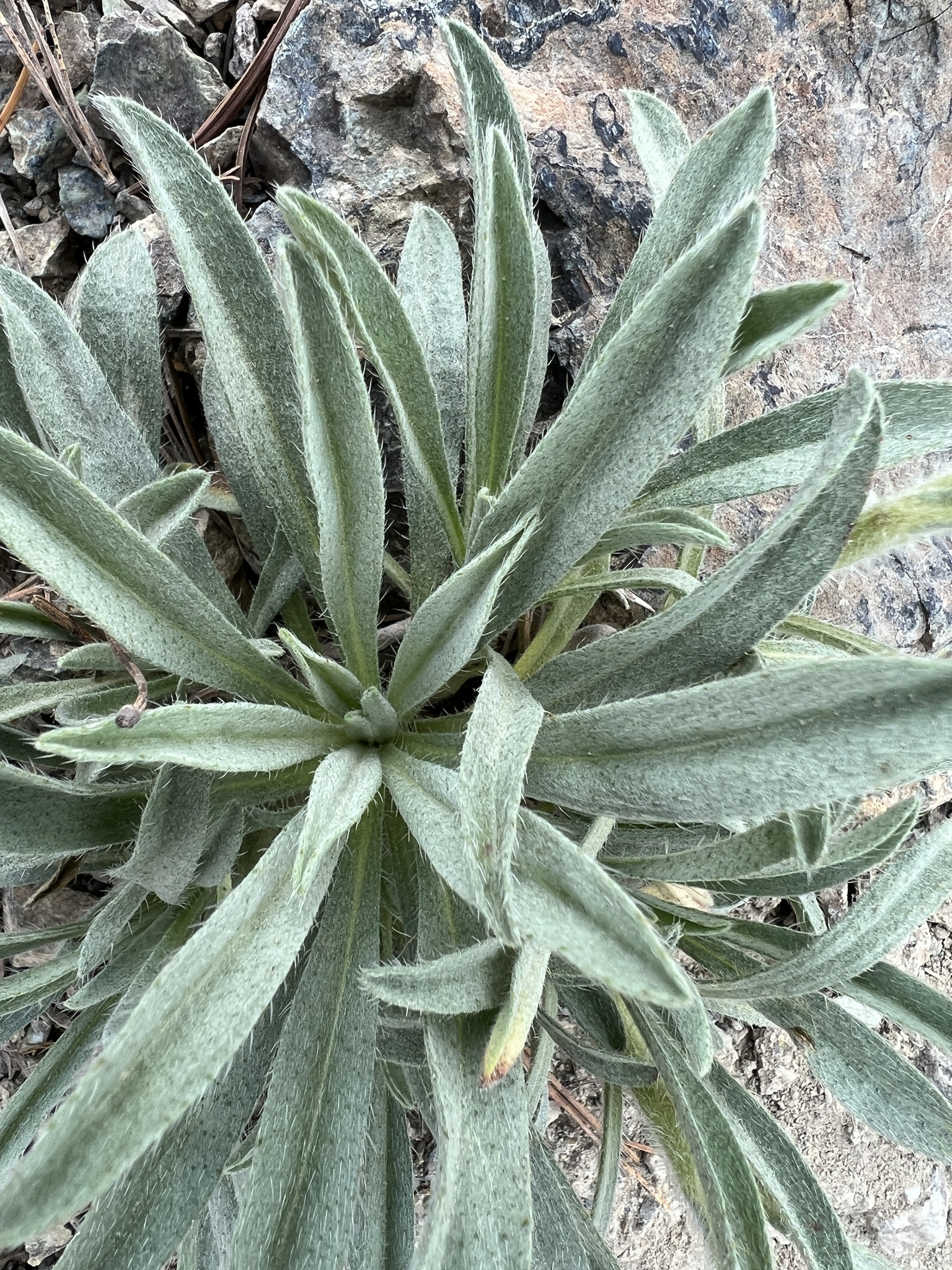
Oreocarya thompsonii leaf rosette growing in the Wenatchee Mountains, WA

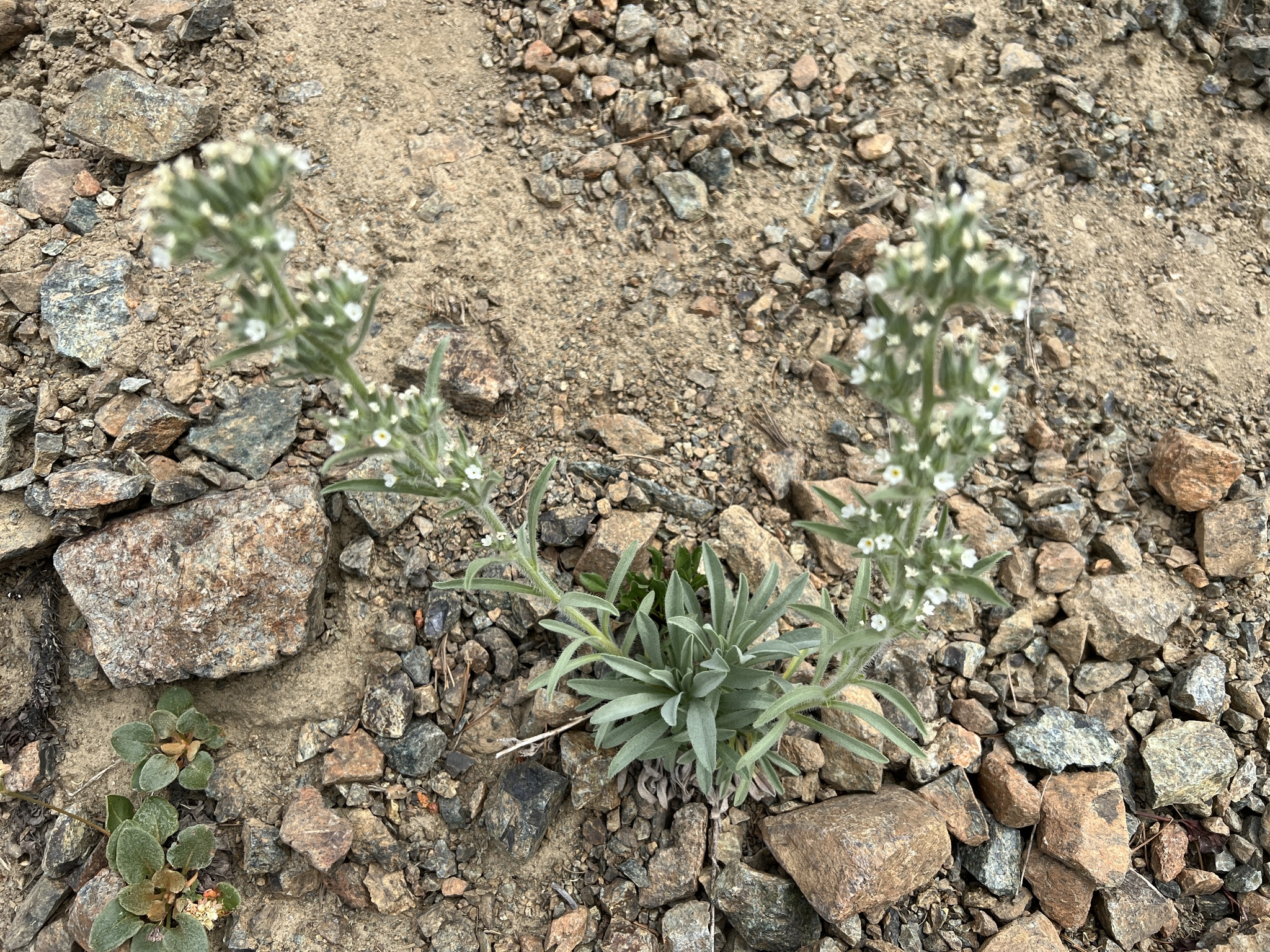
Oreocarya thompsonii growing in the Wenatchee Mountains, WA

== Range ==
Oreocarya thompsonii is endemic to the Wenatchee Mountains in Washington State.

== Habitat ==
Oreocarya thompsonii is found on high rocky slopes, usually associated with serpentine rock.
