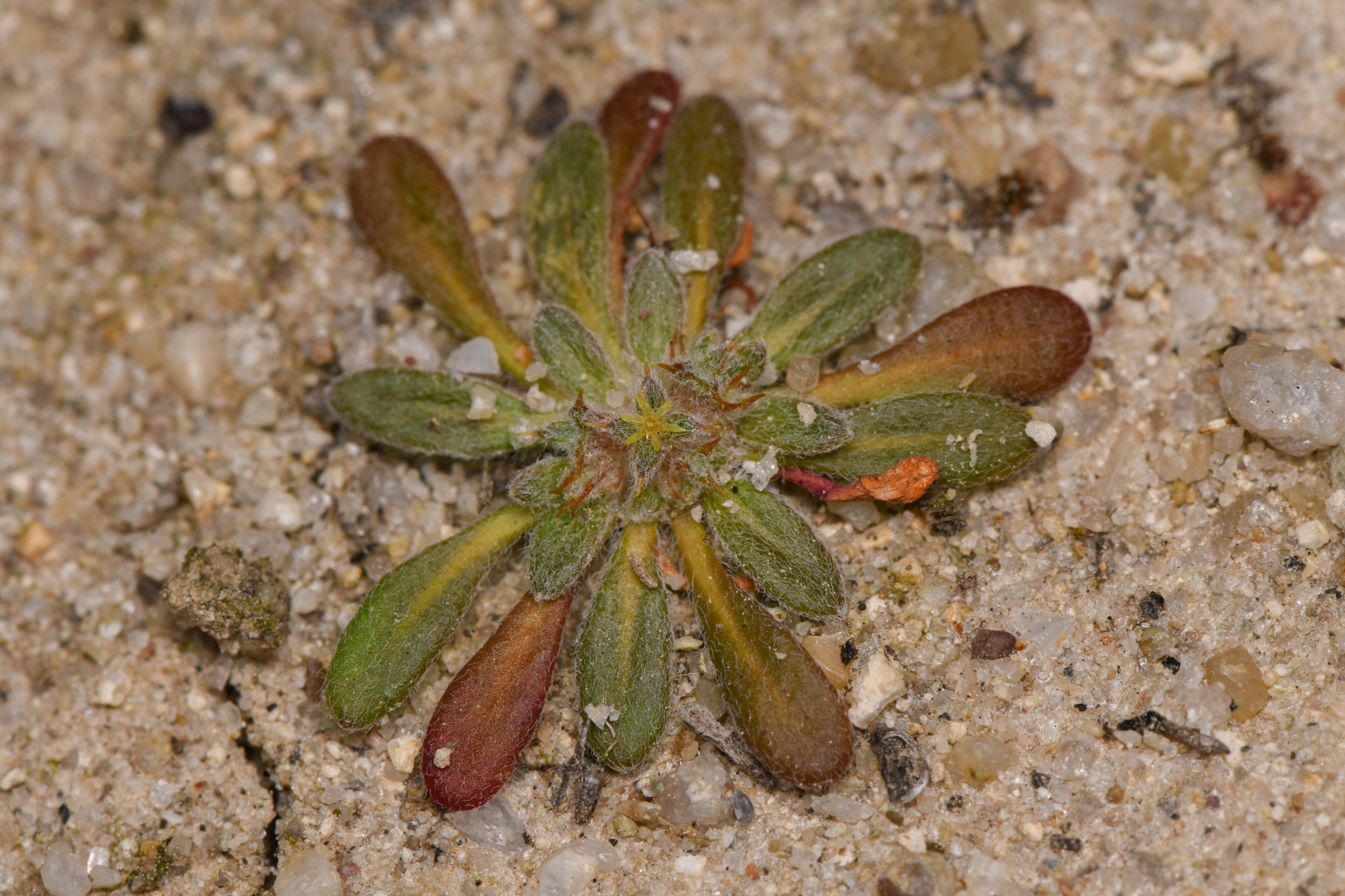

Conservation status
- Endangered (ESA)

- Critically Imperiled (NatureServe)

Scientific classification
- Kingdom: Plantae
- Clade: Tracheophytes
- Clade: Angiosperms
- Clade: Eudicots
- Order: Caryophyllales
- Family: Polygonaceae
- Genus: Chorizanthe
- Species: C. orcuttiana

Binomial name
- Chorizanthe orcuttiana Parry

= Chorizanthe orcuttiana =

Species of flowering plant

Chorizanthe orcuttiana is a rare small annual plant in the buckwheat family, Polygonaceae. It is known commonly as Orcutt's spineflower or the San Diego spineflower, and it is endemic to San Diego County, California. The plant is diminutive, and a hand-lens is necessary for proper identification. The plant is very sensitive to temperature and precipitation, and under drought or hot conditions the seeds will not germinate or survive. The plant is visible anywhere from February through July during good rain year, but most years the plant is only visible from April to June. Each minute flower yields one seed.

== Description ==
This species is an annual herb, growing in a prostrate habit with the entire plant covered in dense, white, silky hairs. Before anthesis, the basal leaves form a rosette 0.5 to 5 cm (0.20 to 1.97 in) in diameter. The leaves are shaped narrowly oblanceolate, measuring 0.5 to 1.5 cm (0.20 to 0.59 in) long by 0.2 to 0.35 cm (0.079 to 0.138 in) wide, with an acute tip. C. orcuttiana also expresses two types of leaf shapes on different individuals, with one type being oblanceolate with an obtuse leaf apex and a reddish tinge on the upper surface, and the other slightly elongated. The leaves are attached to the plant via a pubescent petiole.

The inflorescence is cymose. There may be awns on the inflorescence, and if there are, they usually measure 0.6 to 1 mm (0.024 to 0.039 in). The involucres are in small clusters roughly 0.5 to 1 cm (0.20 to 0.39 in) across. There are 2 bracts, positioned opposite. In some plants, one of the two bracts tends to be laminar, oblanceolate, and awnless, while the one opposite to it is greatly reduced and terminated by a short, straight awn. The involucres are shaped campanulate, 3-angled and 3-ribbed and colored greenish. The involucres are faintly transversely ridged, with 3 teeth and hooked awns. The involucre tubes are 1.8 to 2 mm (0.071 to 0.079 in) long, and pubescent.

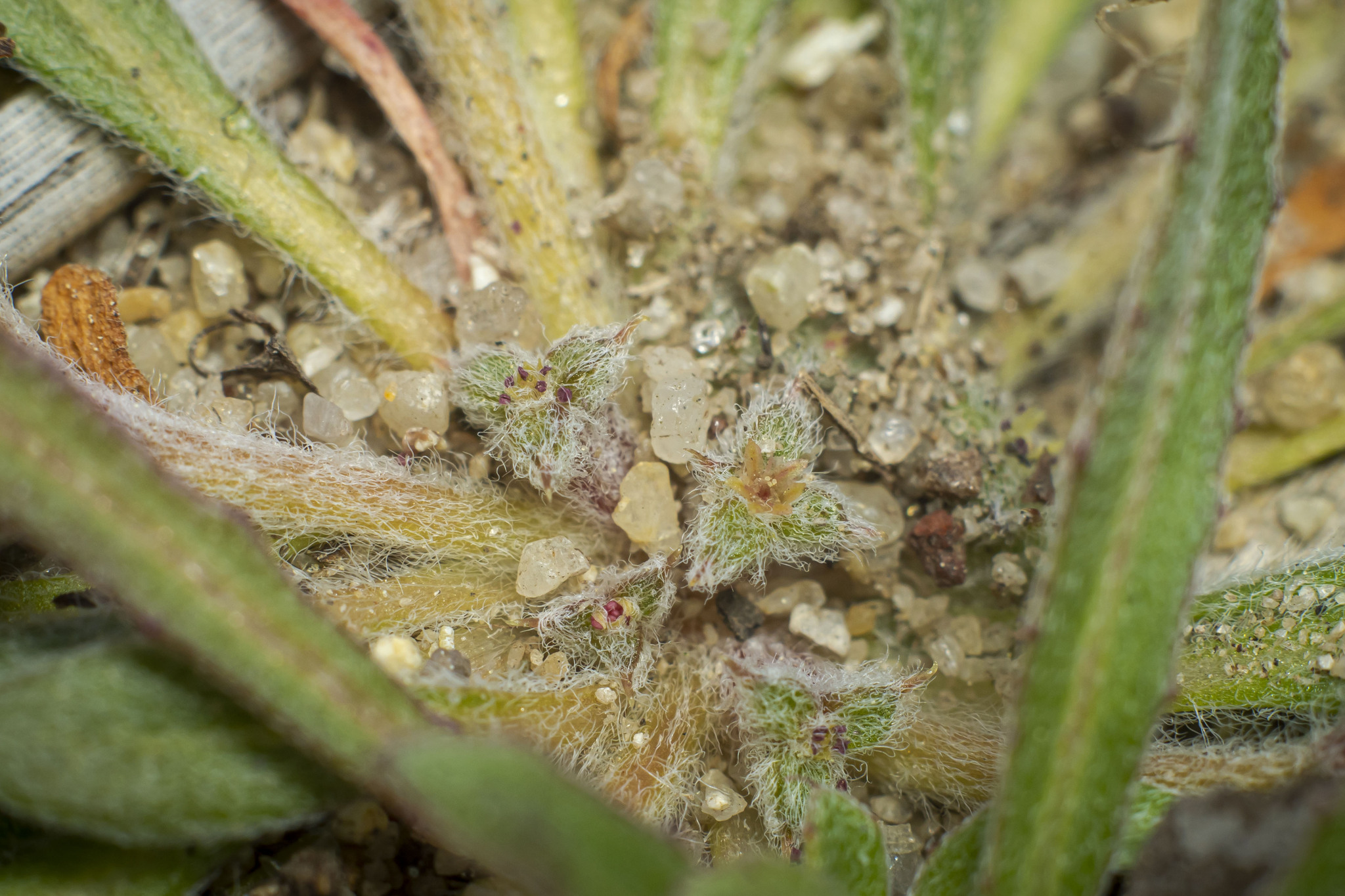
The diminutive pale yellow flowers are in the center of the hairy triangular involucres

The flowers first emerge in tight bundles in the center of the rosette, with each of the individual flowers enclosed inside an involucre. The flowers are 1.5 to 1.8 mm (0.059 to 0.071 in) large, covered in dense hair, and with a yellow perianth. There are 9 stamens attached at the top of the floral tube, with reddish anthers. Anthesis occurs in February, and within 30 days, the plants begin to branch. The branching plants are significantly larger, and reach between 1 and 17 cm (0.39 and 6.69 in) in diameter.

== Taxonomy ==
This species is octoploid, and may have arose through ancient hybridization between other Chorizanthe, perhaps C. procumbens and C. polygonoides, leading to a doubling of the chromosomes.

=== Characteristics ===
This species co-occurs with other similar small plants, such as Mucronea californica and Camissoniopsis bistorta, which can make identification difficult when plants are still in their vegetative stages. M. californica has rosettes of elongated leaves, but they tend to have rounded or truncated leaf apices and only slightly papillate leaves that are hairy on the edges. C. bistorta has a wider range of sizes, but has a mean rosette size of around 2 to 3 cm (0.79 to 1.18 in). C. bistorta is easier to distinguish because their leaves tend to be more purplish-gray, with dense, white, coarse pubescence and a purple underside of the leaf, along with an acute leaf apex.

== Distribution and habitat ==
The plant requires open habitat near the coast, such as sandstone bluffs and openings in maritime chaparral. About 82% to 93% of San Diego County's maritime chaparral habitat has been destroyed for development and damaged by human activity such as recreation; there are just over 3000 acres remaining. All the known occurrences are within five kilometers of the coastline. It grows on soils of white sand which are neutral or somewhat acidic and low in organic material. The substrates originate from iron-rich sandstone.

== Conservation ==
The plant was believed to be extinct until it was re-discovered on Point Loma. Since its re-discovery, two additional populations were discovered on Naval Base Point Loma, and one small population is seen infrequently at Oak Crest Park in Encinitas, California. Lately, this population has been made up of one single plant. Most of its historic range has been developed, but due to its diminutive, infrequent nature, there is a significant chance that other undiscovered populations exist, possibly at Torrey Pines State Park, where it has been noted before. The most recent estimate for a total remaining global population is between 470 and 3000 individuals. It is a federally listed endangered species of the United States.

The worst threat to the species is the invasion of non-native plant species, such as ice plant (Carpobrotus edulis) and Natal grass (Melinis repens). The plant is threatened by its limited number of populations and small population size, which increase the likelihood of extinction; the plant may be naturally rare, but its rarity is exacerbated by other conditions, such as fire suppression.
