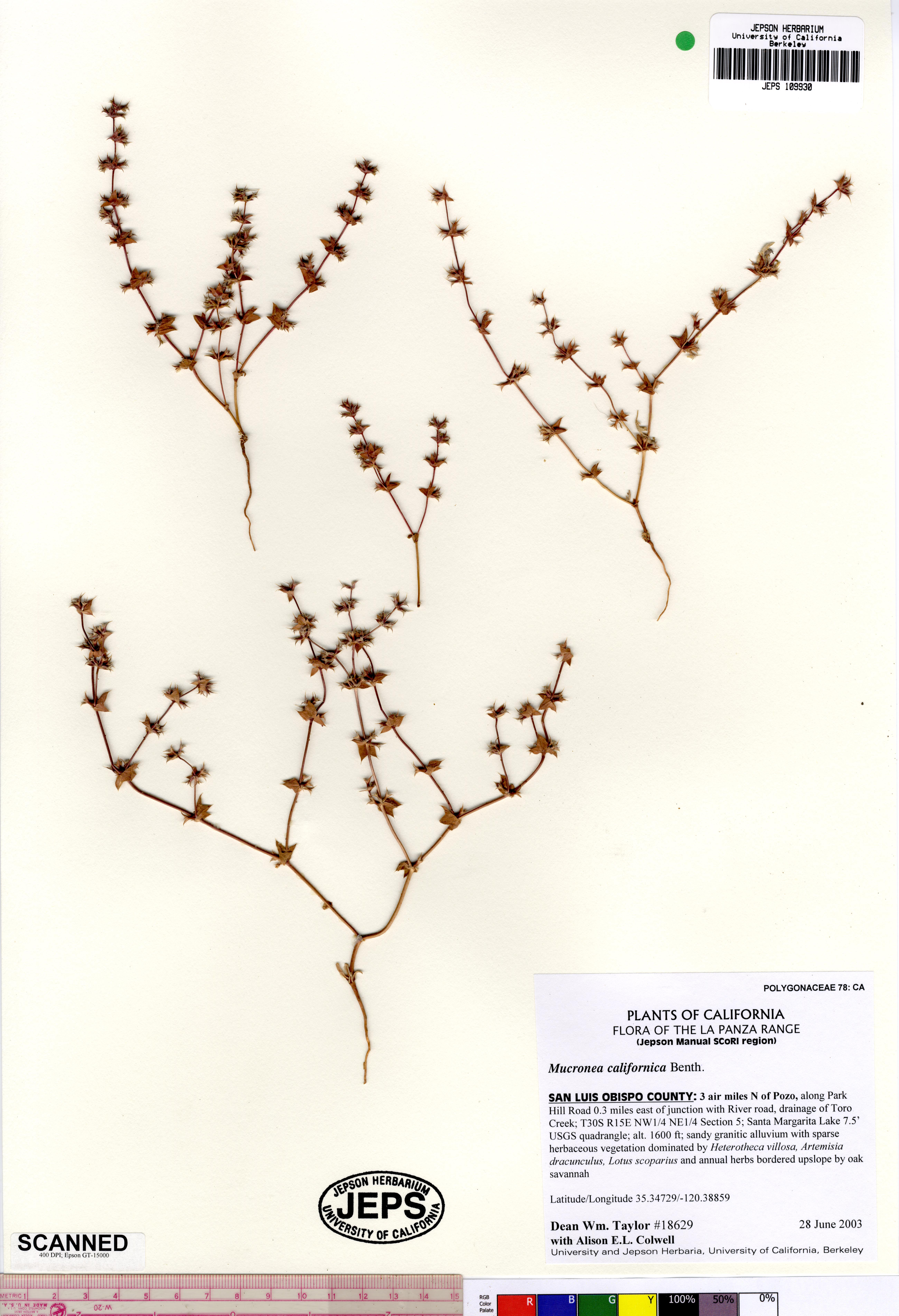

Scientific classification
- Kingdom: Plantae
- Clade: Tracheophytes
- Clade: Angiosperms
- Clade: Eudicots
- Order: Caryophyllales
- Family: Polygonaceae
- Subfamily: Eriogonoideae
- Genus: Mucronea; Benth.

Species
- Mucronea californica; Mucronea perfoliata

= Mucronea =

Genus of flowering plants

Mucronea is a genus of plants in the family Polygonaceae with two species restricted to California. Known generally as spineflowers, they are closely related to genus Chorizanthe. They are annual herbs producing slender, erect, glandular stems from taproots. The leaves are located in a rosette around the base of the stem and wither quickly. The inflorescence is an open array of flowers, each blooming in an involucre of spiny bracts lined with awn-tipped teeth. The six-lobed flowers are white to pink.

== Species ==
- Mucronea californica Bentham – California spineflower
- Mucronea perfoliata (A. Gray) A. Heller – Perfoliate spineflower
