= Chorizanthe leptotheca =

Conservation status
- Vulnerable (NatureServe)

Scientific classification
- Kingdom: Plantae
- Clade: Tracheophytes
- Clade: Angiosperms
- Clade: Eudicots
- Order: Caryophyllales
- Family: Polygonaceae
- Genus: Chorizanthe
- Species: C. leptotheca

Binomial name
- Chorizanthe leptotheca Goodman

Species of flowering plant

Chorizanthe leptotheca is a species of flowering plant in the buckwheat family known by the common names Ramona spineflower and Peninsular spineflower. It is native to the Peninsular Ranges of southern California and Baja California, where it grows in chaparral and forest habitat. It is very similar to its close relative, Turkish rugging (Chorizanthe staticoides).

Chorizanthe leptotheca is an erect herb growing up to about 35 centimeters tall. The leaves are basal, oval in shape and up to about 3 centimeters long. The herbage is fuzzy to quite hairy in texture, and generally reddish in color. The inflorescence is a loose cluster of flowers, each surrounded by six reddish bracts coated in curly hairs and tipped in hooked awns. The flower itself is up to 6 millimeters wide, pink or red in color and hairy.
