= Chorizanthe wheeleri =

Conservation status
- Vulnerable (NatureServe)

Scientific classification
- Kingdom: Plantae
- Clade: Tracheophytes
- Clade: Angiosperms
- Clade: Eudicots
- Order: Caryophyllales
- Family: Polygonaceae
- Genus: Chorizanthe
- Species: C. wheeleri

Binomial name
- Chorizanthe wheeleri S.Wats.

Species of flowering plant

Chorizanthe wheeleri is a rare species of flowering plant in the buckwheat family known by the common names Santa Barbara spineflower and Wheeler's spineflower. It is endemic to Santa Cruz and Santa Rosa Islands, two of the Channel Islands of California.

It resembles the closely related plant known as Turkish rugging (Chorizanthe staticoides) and any reported mainland occurrences are actually specimens of this much more common species.

Chorizanthe wheeleri is erect, growing up to about 25 centimeters tall, reddish in color and hairy in texture. The inflorescence is a dense cluster of flowers, each flower surrounded by six hairy bracts with hooked awns at the tips. The flower is white to red and only 2 or 3 millimeters wide.
