= C. diffusa =

C. diffusa may refer to:

- Chorizanthe diffusa, the diffuse spineflower, a flowering plant species endemic to California
- Canscora diffusa, a plant species

== See also ==
- List of Latin and Greek words commonly used in systematic names#D
