= Chorizanthe blakleyi =

Conservation status
- Imperiled (NatureServe)

Scientific classification
- Kingdom: Plantae
- Clade: Tracheophytes
- Clade: Angiosperms
- Clade: Eudicots
- Order: Caryophyllales
- Family: Polygonaceae
- Genus: Chorizanthe
- Species: C. blakleyi

Binomial name
- Chorizanthe blakleyi Hardham

Species of flowering plant

Chorizanthe blakleyi is a rare species of flowering plant in the buckwheat family known by the common name Blakley's spineflower. It is endemic to the Sierra Madre Mountains of Santa Barbara County, California, where it is known from only eight occurrences, four of which are within the bounds of the Los Padres National Forest. It grows only on north-facing slopes in chaparral and woodland habitat. This plant grows upright to no more than 15 centimeters tall. It is yellow-green and hairy, with a few basal leaves up to about 2 centimeters long. The inflorescence contains several flowers, each surrounded by a tube of six hairy bracts with straight or hooked awns. The flower is a few millimeters wide with white or pink deeply notched tepals.
