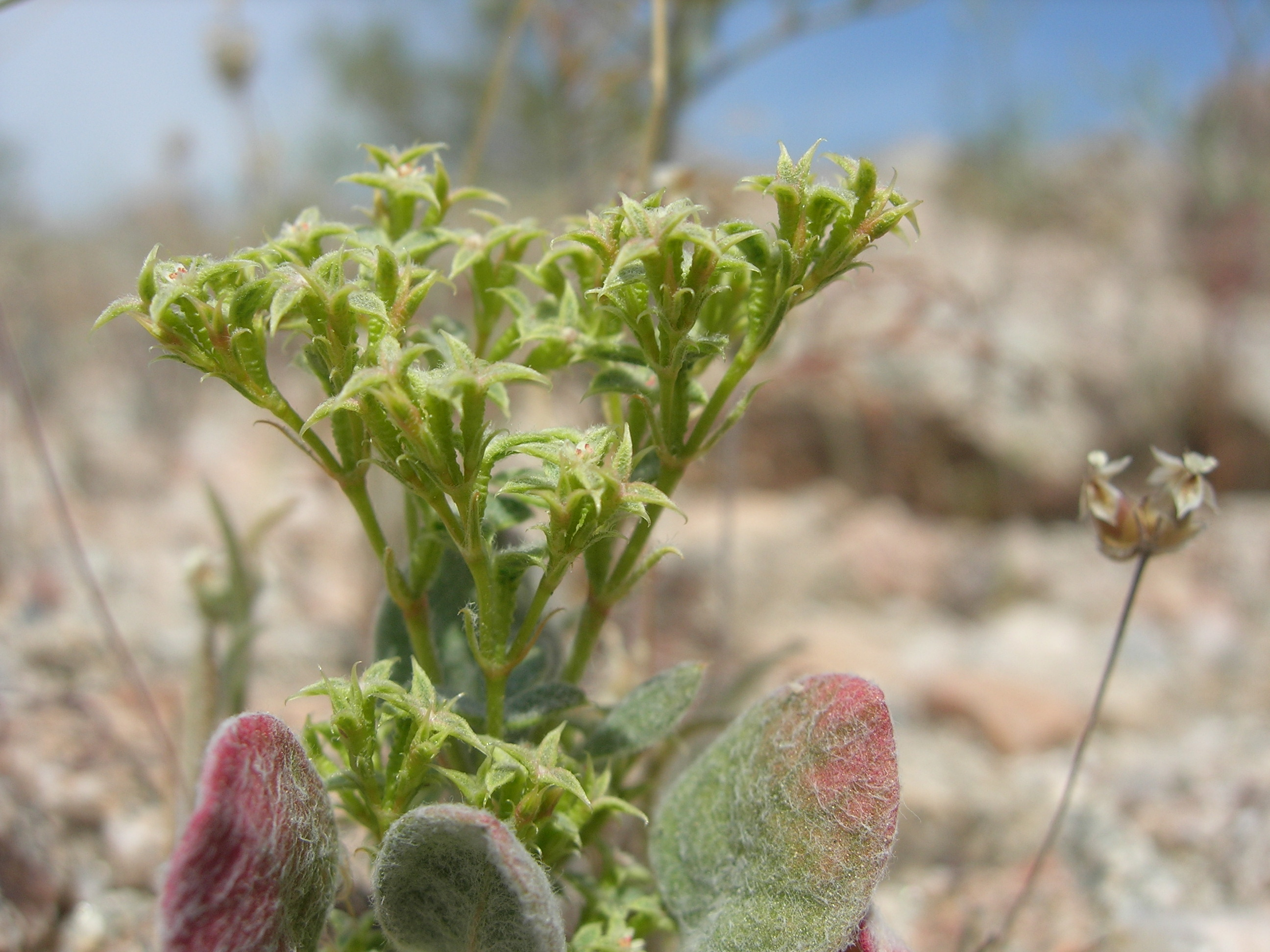

Scientific classification
- Kingdom: Plantae
- Clade: Tracheophytes
- Clade: Angiosperms
- Clade: Eudicots
- Order: Caryophyllales
- Family: Polygonaceae
- Genus: Chorizanthe
- Species: C. corrugata

Binomial name
- Chorizanthe corrugata Torr. & A.Gray

= Chorizanthe corrugata =

Species of flowering plant

Chorizanthe corrugata is a species of flowering plant in the buckwheat family known by the common name wrinkled spineflower. It is native to the Mojave and Sonoran Deserts of the southwestern United States and two states of northwest Mexico, Baja California and Sonora.

== Description ==
Chorizanthe corrugata is an erect, branching herb growing to a maximum height near half a meter. Most of the rounded or oval leaves are located about the base of the plant, each up to 2 centimeters long.

The inflorescence is made up of a cluster of flowers, each opening from a cylindrical, tubular involucre in shades of green or tan. The plant can be identified by the transversely corrugated surface of this involucral tube. Along the top edge of the tube are three narrow bracts tipped in hooked awns. The flower itself is only about 2 millimeters long, hairy, and white in color.
