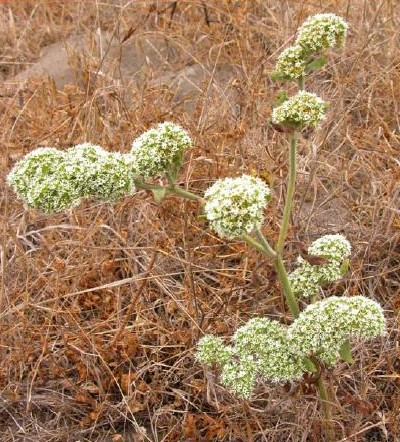

Conservation status
- Endangered (ESA)

Scientific classification
- Kingdom: Plantae
- Clade: Tracheophytes
- Clade: Angiosperms
- Clade: Eudicots
- Order: Caryophyllales
- Family: Polygonaceae
- Genus: Chorizanthe
- Species: C. robusta

Binomial name
- Chorizanthe robusta Parry

= Chorizanthe robusta =

Species of flowering plant

Chorizanthe robusta is a species of flowering plant in the buckwheat family. It is endemic to California, where it is a rare, federally listed endangered species.

== Description ==
Chorizanthe robusta is variable in form, growing decumbent or erect and reaching a maximum length of half a meter. It is grayish in color and hairy. The inflorescence is made up of several flowers with each flower surrounded by white or pink bracts with hooked tips. The flower itself is just a few millimeters long and white to pink in color.

== Varieties ==
It is composed of two varieties:

- var. robusta, known generally as the robust spineflower, which is known only from southern Santa Cruz and Monterey Counties,
- var. hartwegii, the Scotts Valley spineflower, which is known from a few locations in Scotts Valley in Santa Cruz County.

The plant is closely related to Chorizanthe pungens, another rare endemic from the area.
