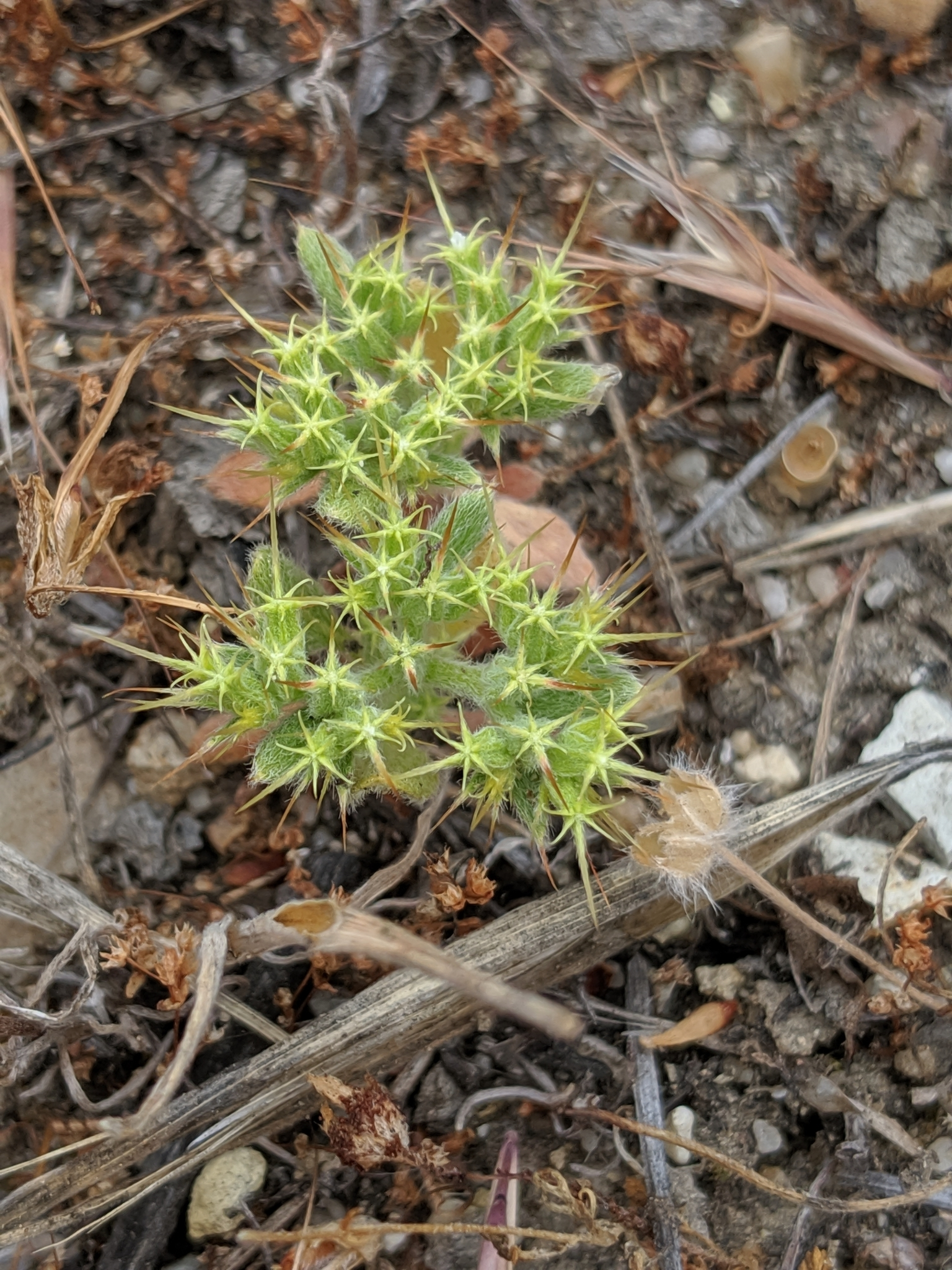

Conservation status
- Vulnerable (NatureServe)

Scientific classification
- Kingdom: Plantae
- Clade: Tracheophytes
- Clade: Angiosperms
- Clade: Eudicots
- Order: Caryophyllales
- Family: Polygonaceae
- Genus: Chorizanthe
- Species: C. uniaristata

Binomial name
- Chorizanthe uniaristata Torr. & A.Gray

= Chorizanthe uniaristata =

Species of flowering plant

Chorizanthe uniaristata is a species of flowering plant in the family Polygonaceae known by the common name one-awn spineflower. It is endemic to central California, where it is known from several of the local mountain ranges, as well as the Central Coast.

It grows in sandy, gravelly, and rocky soils in chaparral and woodland. This plant has upright or decumbent stems up to about 25 centimeters in length. It is hairy and gray, green, or reddish in color. The inflorescence is a cluster of flowers, with each flower surrounded by an array of six hairy bracts. One bract is much longer than the others and has a long, straight awn; the other bracts have hooked awns. The flower is 2 or 3 millimeters long and usually white.
