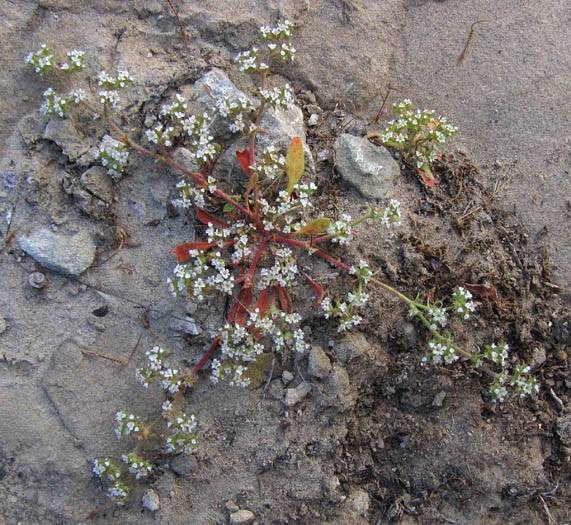

Conservation status
- Vulnerable (NatureServe)

Scientific classification
- Kingdom: Plantae
- Clade: Tracheophytes
- Clade: Angiosperms
- Clade: Eudicots
- Order: Caryophyllales
- Family: Polygonaceae
- Genus: Chorizanthe
- Species: C. parryi

Binomial name
- Chorizanthe parryi S.Wats.

= Chorizanthe parryi =

Species of flowering plant

Chorizanthe parryi is a species of flowering plant in the buckwheat family known by the common name Parry's spineflower and San Bernardino spineflower.

The plant is endemic to Southern California, where it is found in the San Bernardino Mountains, San Gabriel Mountains and Western Transverse Ranges, the Colorado Desert, and along the southern coast. It is found mainly in chaparral scrub plant communities.

== Description ==
Chorizanthe parryi is a small, sprawling herb with roughly hairy stems spreading along the ground or somewhat upright. There are a few leaves up to four centimeters long located mainly around the base of the stems where they emerge from the ground.

The flowers have urn-shaped bases of woolly bracts whose points may be straight or hooked, the characteristic which differentiates the two varieties. The tiny flower is white and sometimes hairy.

=== Varieties ===
- Chorizanthe parryi var. fernandina — San Fernando Valley spineflower, endemic to Southern California and formerly known in 10 locations in the foothills around the San Fernando Valley and ranges in Los Angeles, Orange, and Ventura counties. Those were lost to development, and botanists thought the species was extinct from 1929 until it was discovered in 1999. It is now only known from 2 populations: on Laskey Mesa in Upper Las Virgenes Canyon Open Space Preserve of the Simi Hills in Ventura County; and on the proposed Newhall Ranch mega−development site in the Santa Clara River Valley at the base of the northern Santa Susana Mountains in Los Angeles County. It is a state California Department of Fish and Wildlife and California Native Plant Society listed Critically endangered species.
- Chorizanthe parryi var. parryi — Parry's spineflower, San Bernardino spineflower.
