= Chorizanthe ventricosa =

Priest Valley spineflower

Scientific classification
- Kingdom: Plantae
- Clade: Tracheophytes
- Clade: Angiosperms
- Clade: Eudicots
- Order: Caryophyllales
- Family: Polygonaceae
- Genus: Chorizanthe
- Species: C. ventricosa

Binomial name
- Chorizanthe ventricosa Goodman

Synonyms
- Chorizanthe palmeri var. ventricosa (Goodman) Munz

Species of flowering plant

Chorizanthe ventricosa, common name Priest Valley spineflower, is a plant species endemic to a small region in the Coastal Ranges of west-central California. It is found only on serpentine outcrops in grasslands and pine-oak woodlands at elevations of 500–1000 m. It has been reported from 4 counties: Monterey, San Benito, Fresno and San Luis Obispo.

Chorizanthe ventricosa is an herb up to 70 cm tall, forming large spreading colonies. Leaves are up to 5 cm long. Flowers are formed in clusters up to 6 cm across, with green bracts with pointed tips giving the impression of spines. Flowers are 2-colored, white or yellow plus red or maroon.
