= Chorizanthe rectispina =

Conservation status
- Imperiled (NatureServe)

Scientific classification
- Kingdom: Plantae
- Clade: Tracheophytes
- Clade: Angiosperms
- Clade: Eudicots
- Order: Caryophyllales
- Family: Polygonaceae
- Genus: Chorizanthe
- Species: C. rectispina

Binomial name
- Chorizanthe rectispina Goodman

Species of flowering plant

Chorizanthe rectispina is a species of flowering plant in the buckwheat family known by the common names prickly spineflower and straight-awned spineflower. It is endemic to California, where it is known from about twenty occurrences from Monterey to Santa Barbara Counties. It grows in dry habitat types such as chaparral and woodland in the hills of the Central Coast Ranges. It is a low, spreading plant with stems up to about 25 centimeters long, grayish to greenish in color and hairy in texture. The inflorescence is a cluster of flowers, each flower surrounded by six hairy bracts which are grayish to pink in color and tipped with awns. One bract is longer than the others and has a straight awn, and the other smaller bracts may have hooked awns. The tiny flower at the center of the bract array is a few millimeters wide and white and yellow in color.
