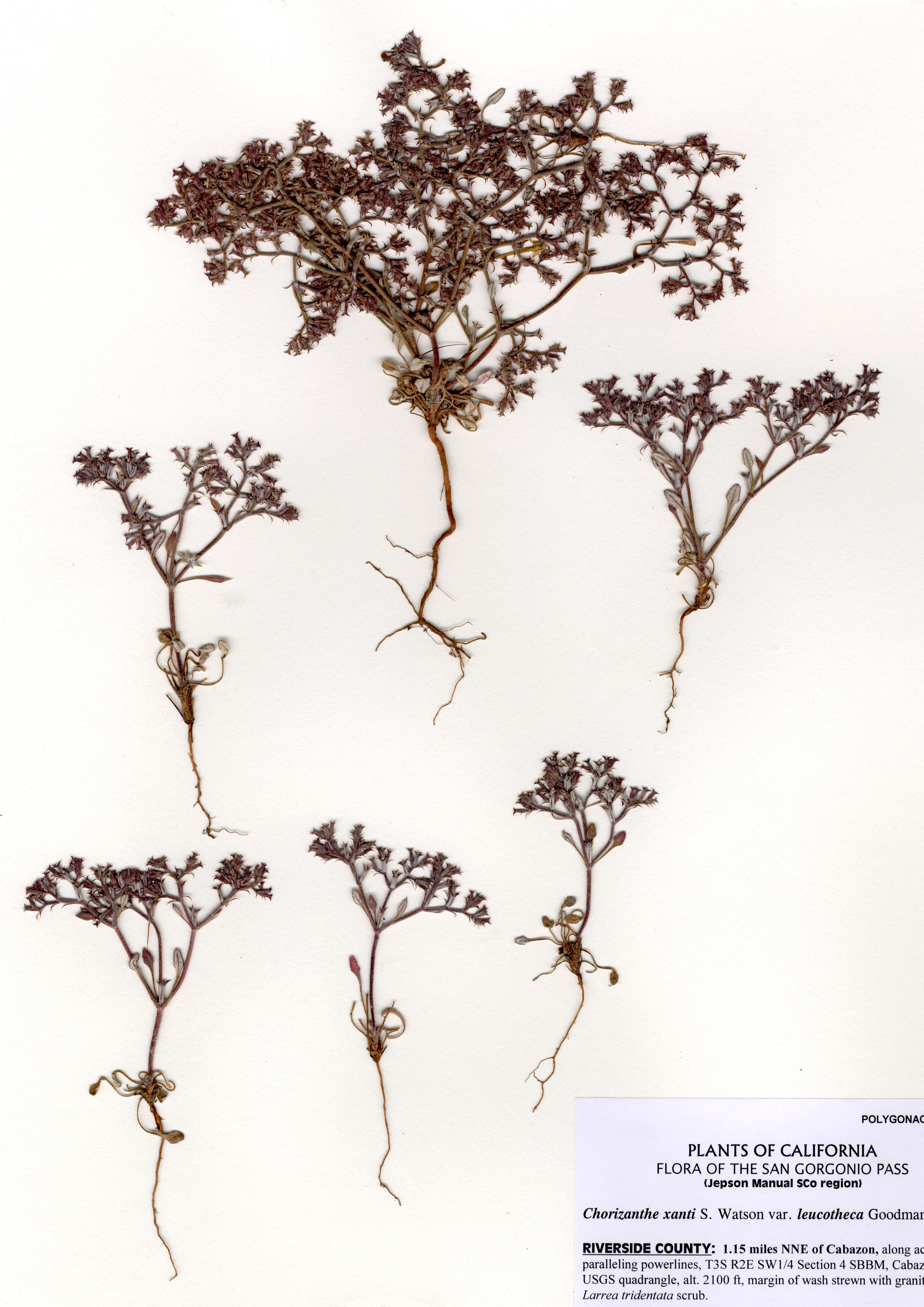
- var. leucotheca herbarium specimen

Scientific classification
- Kingdom: Plantae
- Clade: Tracheophytes
- Clade: Angiosperms
- Clade: Eudicots
- Order: Caryophyllales
- Family: Polygonaceae
- Genus: Chorizanthe
- Species: C. xanti

Binomial name
- Chorizanthe xanti S.Wats.

= Chorizanthe xanti =

Species of flowering plant

Chorizanthe xanti is a species of flowering plant in the buckwheat family known by the common name Riverside spineflower. It is endemic to California, where it grows in several of the mountain ranges from the Sierra Nevada to the Southern California Transverse Ranges in forest, woodland, and scrub habitats.

== Description ==
Chorizanthe xanti is generally erect in form, reaching up to about 30 centimeters in height, and reddish in color and coated in thin to dense hairs. The inflorescence is a loose cluster of flowers, each flower surrounded by six reddish, curly-haired bracts tipped with hooked awns. The flower is up to 6 millimeters wide and pink to red in color. There are two varieties of this species.

The rarer, var. leucotheca, is known only from the San Jacinto and San Bernardino Mountains. It has a much more thickly woolly inflorescence than the more common variety.
