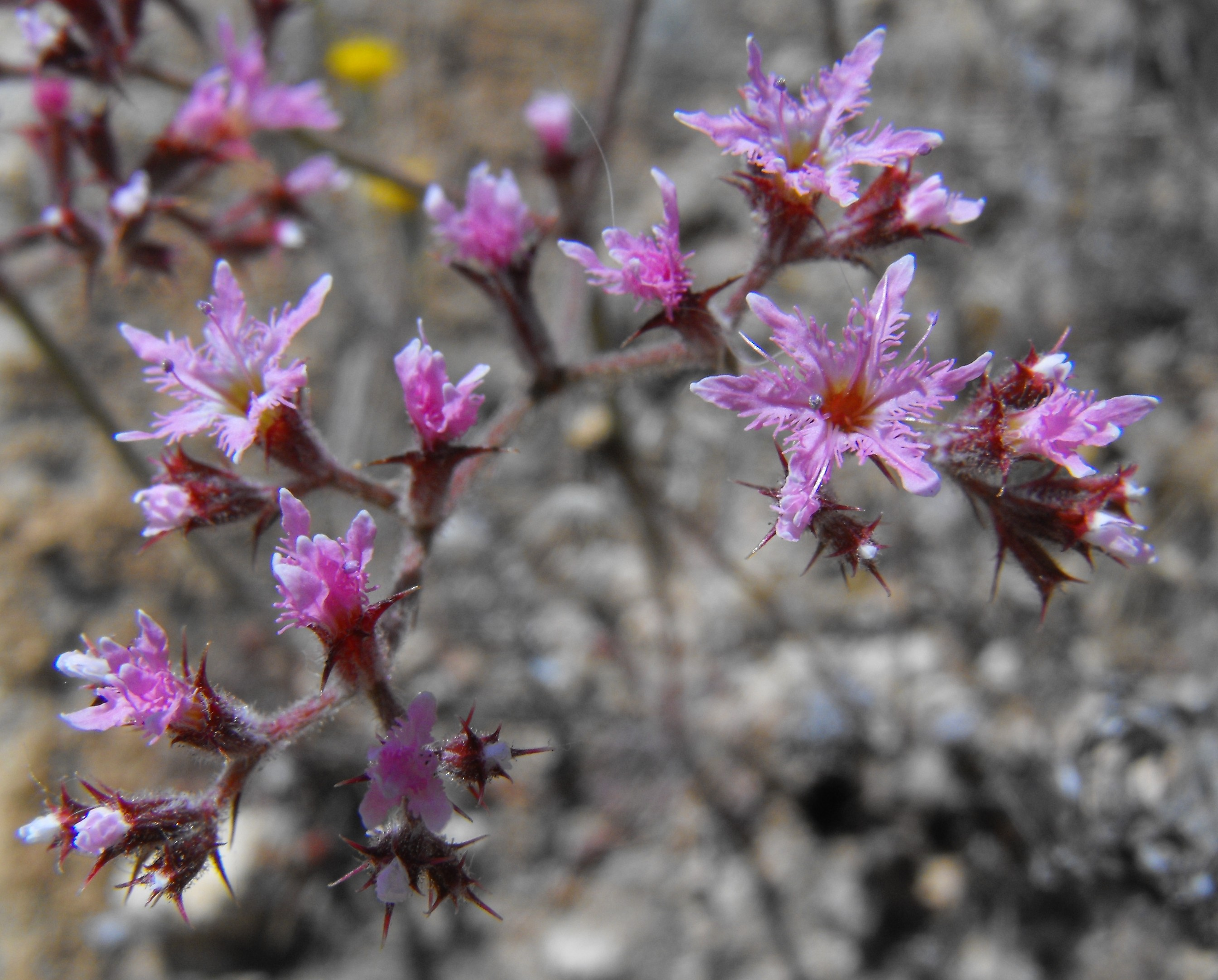

Conservation status
- Vulnerable (NatureServe)

Scientific classification
- Kingdom: Plantae
- Clade: Tracheophytes
- Clade: Angiosperms
- Clade: Eudicots
- Order: Caryophyllales
- Family: Polygonaceae
- Genus: Chorizanthe
- Species: C. fimbriata

Binomial name
- Chorizanthe fimbriata Nutt.

= Chorizanthe fimbriata =

Species of flowering plant

Chorizanthe fimbriata, the fringed spineflower, is an annual plant in the family Polygonaceae, the buckwheats. It is a member of the genus Chorizanthe, the spineflowers, and is native to southern California and northern Baja California.

== Distribution ==
The Chorizanthe fimbriata species is endemic to the San Jacinto Mountains (California) and the Peninsular Ranges in Southern California and Baja California, below 1,600 metres (5,200 ft). It is found in coastal sage and montane chaparral and woodlands habitats.

== Description ==
The Chorizanthe fimbriata plant is low-lying at 10–50 centimetres (3.9–19.7 in), and spreading 1–3.5 metres (3.3–11.5 ft) in diameter. It bears small star-shaped 5-lobed reddish-purple flowers with yellow tubes.

Varieties

There are two varieties of the Fringed spineflower:

Chorizanthe fimbriata var. fimbriata
Chorizanthe fimbriata var. laciniata
