= Chorizanthe breweri =

Conservation status
- Vulnerable (NatureServe)

Scientific classification
- Kingdom: Plantae
- Clade: Tracheophytes
- Clade: Angiosperms
- Clade: Eudicots
- Order: Caryophyllales
- Family: Polygonaceae
- Genus: Chorizanthe
- Species: C. breweri

Binomial name
- Chorizanthe breweri S.Wats.

Species of flowering plant

Chorizanthe breweri is a rare species of flowering plant in the buckwheat family known by the common names San Luis Obispo spineflower and Brewer's spineflower. It is endemic to California, where it is known from about twenty occurrences in the Central Coast Ranges of San Luis Obispo and far southern Monterey Counties. It grows in the chaparral and woodlands of the range, generally on serpentine soils. This small plant produces decumbent stems extending along the ground and sometimes growing upright to a maximum length of about half a meter. The herbage is mostly reddish in color and somewhat hairy. The inflorescence is a cluster of flowers, each surrounded by six hairy reddish bracts with hooked tips. The flower itself is only about 3 millimeters wide and is white to red and hairy.
