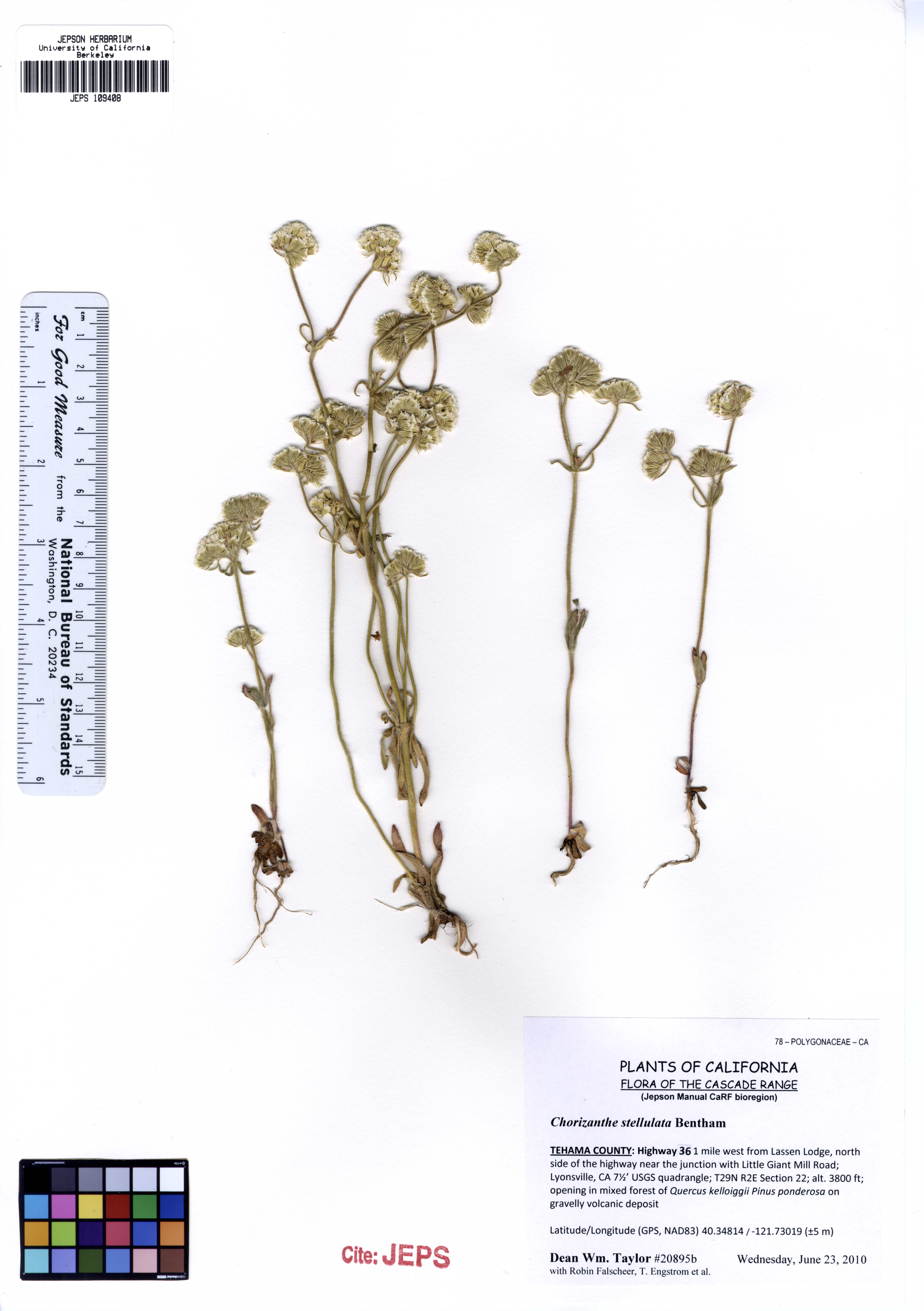

Conservation status
- Vulnerable (NatureServe)

Scientific classification
- Kingdom: Plantae
- Clade: Tracheophytes
- Clade: Angiosperms
- Clade: Eudicots
- Order: Caryophyllales
- Family: Polygonaceae
- Genus: Chorizanthe
- Species: C. stellulata

Binomial name
- Chorizanthe stellulata Benth.

= Chorizanthe stellulata =

Species of flowering plant

Chorizanthe stellulata is a species of flowering plant in the buckwheat family known by the common name starlet spineflower. It is endemic to California, where it grows in the dry woodlands of the low mountains and foothills along the central part of the state, such as the Sierra Nevada foothills. The plant takes an erect form, reaching up to 30 centimeters tall. The leaves are located at the base of the plant, and there is also a whorl of leaves at mid-stem. The inflorescence is a dense cluster of flowers, each flower surrounded by hairy, bristly white bracts tipped with hooked awns. The flower is 4 or 5 millimeters long and white to pink in color.
