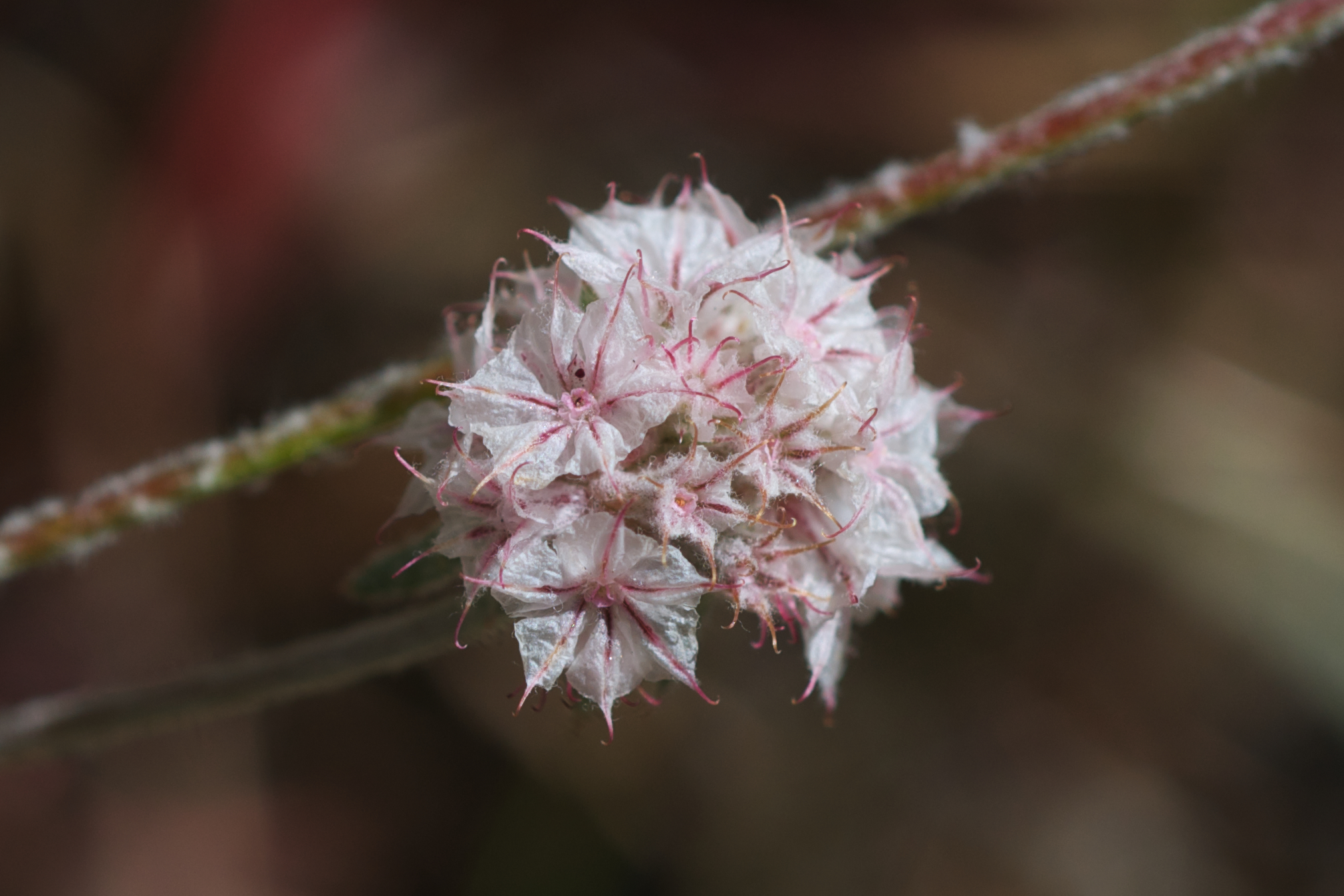

Conservation status
- Vulnerable (NatureServe)

Scientific classification
- Kingdom: Plantae
- Clade: Tracheophytes
- Clade: Angiosperms
- Clade: Eudicots
- Order: Caryophyllales
- Family: Polygonaceae
- Genus: Chorizanthe
- Species: C. membranacea

Binomial name
- Chorizanthe membranacea Benth.

= Chorizanthe membranacea =

Pink spineflower

Species of flowering plant

Chorizanthe membranacea is a species of flowering plant in the buckwheat family known by the common name pink spineflower. It is native to Oregon and California, where it is widespread and in some areas quite common. It can be found in a wide variety of habitats.

This herb grows erect to a maximum height near 1 metre (3.3 ft). It is woolly in texture and most of its parts may bear a pink tint. The leaves are mostly linear in shape and they may occur along the stem as well as at the base. The longest may reach 5 centimeters.

The inflorescence is a dense cluster of flowers, each surrounded by a unit of six fused bracts which are generally white to pinkish in color. The bracts are tipped with hooked awns. The flower itself is just a few millimeters long, white to pink, and quite hairy. There are sometimes small inflorescences located in the cauline leaf axils along the stem.

Chorizanthe membranacea is easily distinguished from other spineflowers by its relative abundance of leaves, its height and upright habit, and the fusion of the bracts of the involucre into a continuous body.
