= Chorizanthe spinosa =

Scientific classification
- Kingdom: Plantae
- Clade: Tracheophytes
- Clade: Angiosperms
- Clade: Eudicots
- Order: Caryophyllales
- Family: Polygonaceae
- Genus: Chorizanthe
- Species: C. spinosa

Binomial name
- Chorizanthe spinosa S.Wats.

Species of plant

Chorizanthe spinosa is an uncommon species of flowering plant in the buckwheat family known by the common name Mojave spineflower. It is endemic to California, where it is known only from the scrub habitat at the western edges of the Mojave Desert.

Chorizanthe spinosa is prostrate or upright, reaching up to 40 centimeters in length. It is grayish in color and hairy in texture. The inflorescence is an open or dense cluster of flowers, with each flower surrounded by green, gray, or pink bracts. There are generally five bracts per flower, with one bract much longer than the others. The bracts are tipped with straight awns. The flower at the center is only about 4 millimeters wide and usually white in color.
