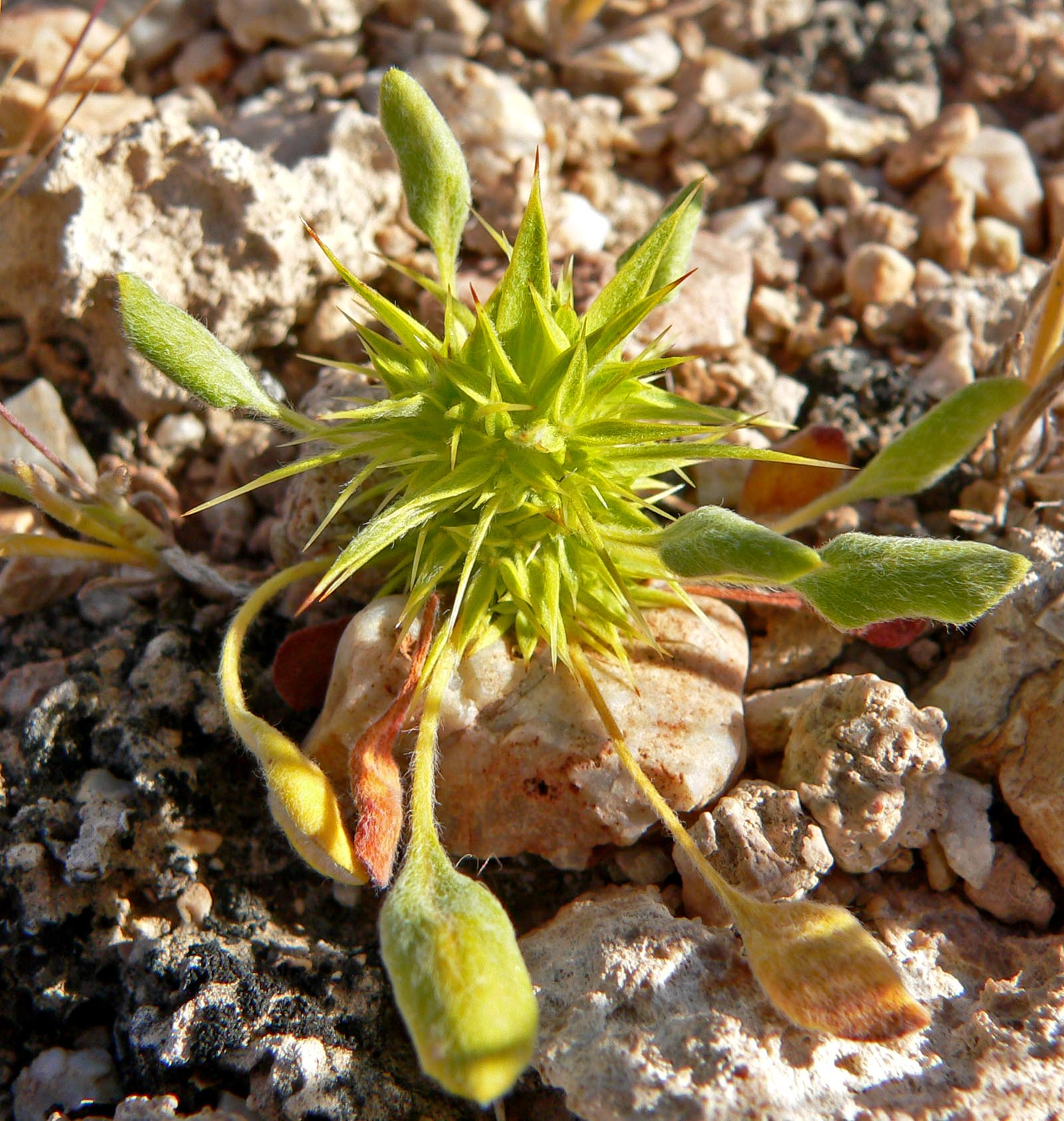

Scientific classification
- Kingdom: Plantae
- Clade: Tracheophytes
- Clade: Angiosperms
- Clade: Eudicots
- Order: Caryophyllales
- Family: Polygonaceae
- Genus: Chorizanthe
- Species: C. rigida

Binomial name
- Chorizanthe rigida (Torr. Torr. & A. Gray

= Chorizanthe rigida =

Species of flowering plant

Chorizanthe rigida, with the common names of devil's spineflower, rigid spineflower, spiny-herb, rigid spiny-herb, is an annual plant in the family Polygonaceae the buckwheats. It is a member of the genus Chorizanthe, the spineflowers and is found in the southwestern United States and northwest Mexico, in the states of California, Nevada, Utah, Arizona, Baja California, and Sonora.

== Distribution ==
Chorizanthe rigida is a common desert plant found in the Sonoran and Mojave Desert – in bajadas (washes), flat mesas that flood with annual rains, and rocky hillsides and ridgelines. A locale range example is its presence in most habitats of the Muggins Mountains Wilderness in southwestern Arizona.

In desert flats, the short 3 inch plant can be easily obscured, by downstream-washed debris that easily collects on the spineflower skeleton. Thus small hillocks of debris are found, a spineflower in the core; possibly this is the advantageous form of germinating at least the source location into a second generation.

In flat mesas the plant can be hidden under clumps and not seen. On a roadside, its skeleton will be left as a single erect plant, the taller plants being found in the highest water-pooled areas. In the eastern Colorado Desert the plant can be found in any major wash in mid spring following at least moderate winter rains.

== Description ==
The Chorizanthe rigida plant, is a short, erect and sometimes single-stalked, but multi-stalked to 5 stalks or more, 2.5-2.5–6.0 inches (1–2 dm) in height. It grows quickly, especially following spring rains. With the onset of early summer it turns into a spine-skeleton. It has a main taproot, mostly longer than the plant is tall, taking advantage of the rainfall's ground moisture.

The devil's spineflower is extremely conspicuous when growing in its bright new green; when desiccated its spiny skeleton is blackish, dark gray, or of medium browns and blends in easily to the desert background ground colors.

In the hottest sections of the western Sonoran Desert of southwestern Arizona the Rigid Spineflower is mostly a 2.5 to 5 inch plant and is often not noticed when the plant goes dry, (see here (a multi-stalked short plant)).

== Gallery ==
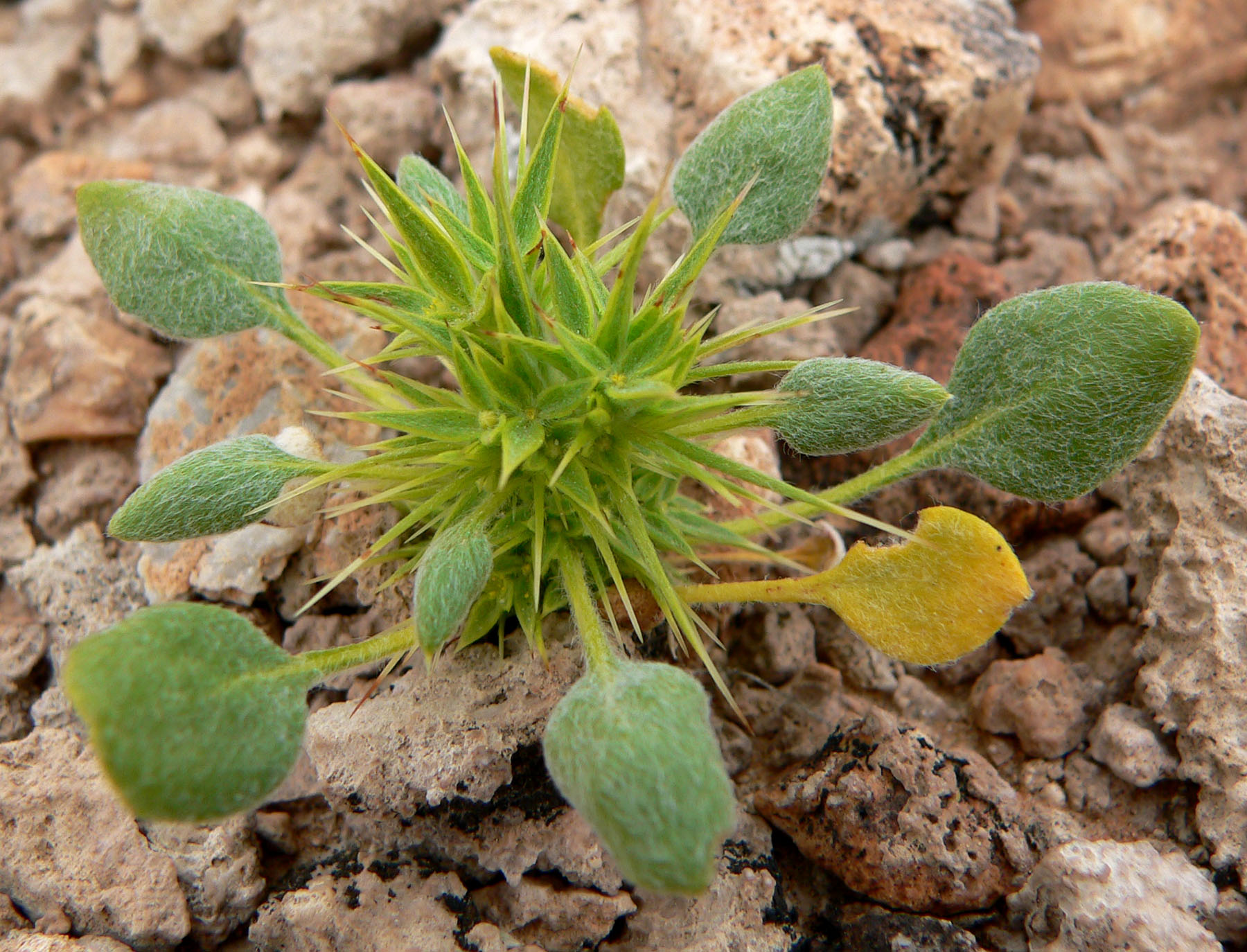

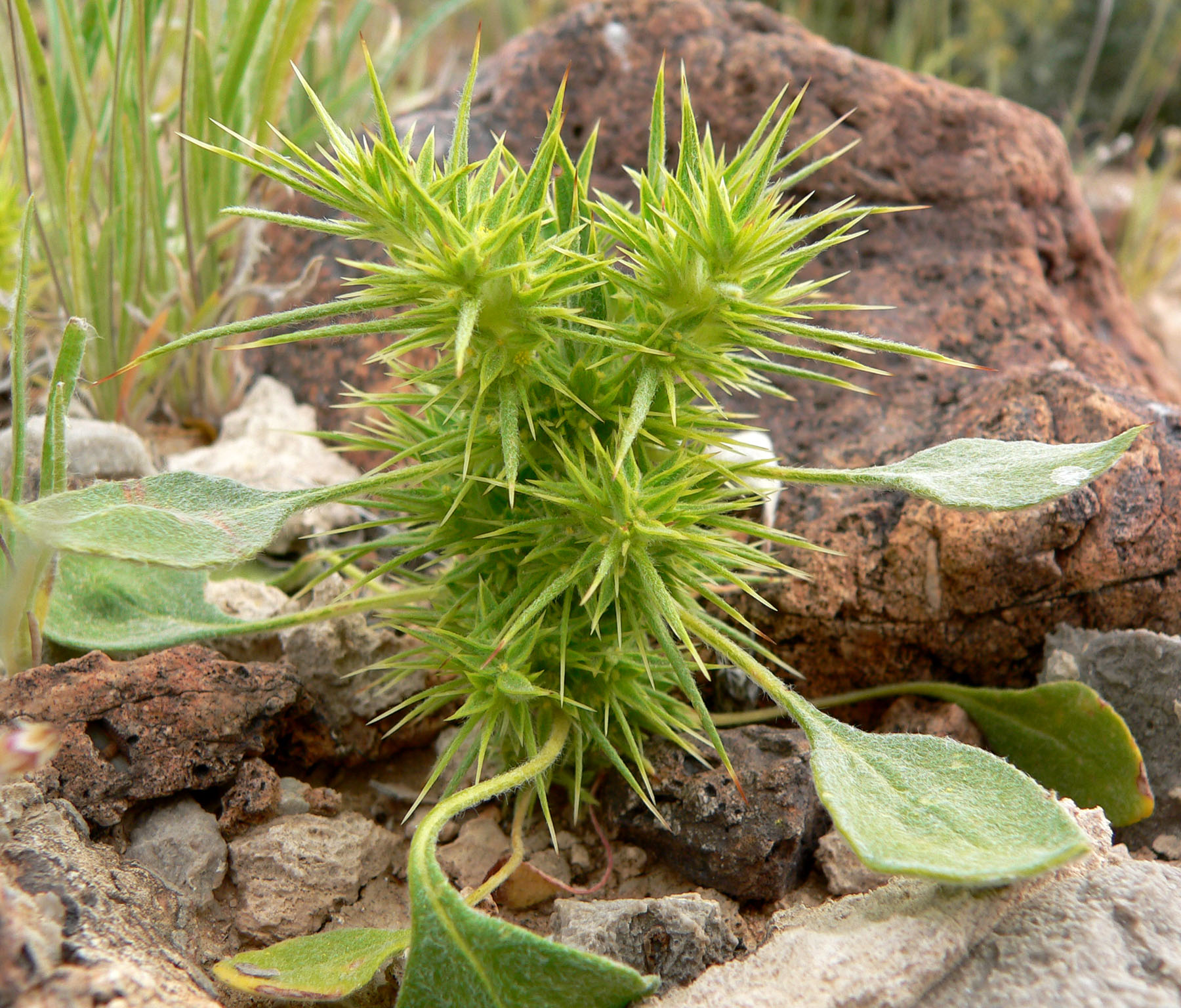

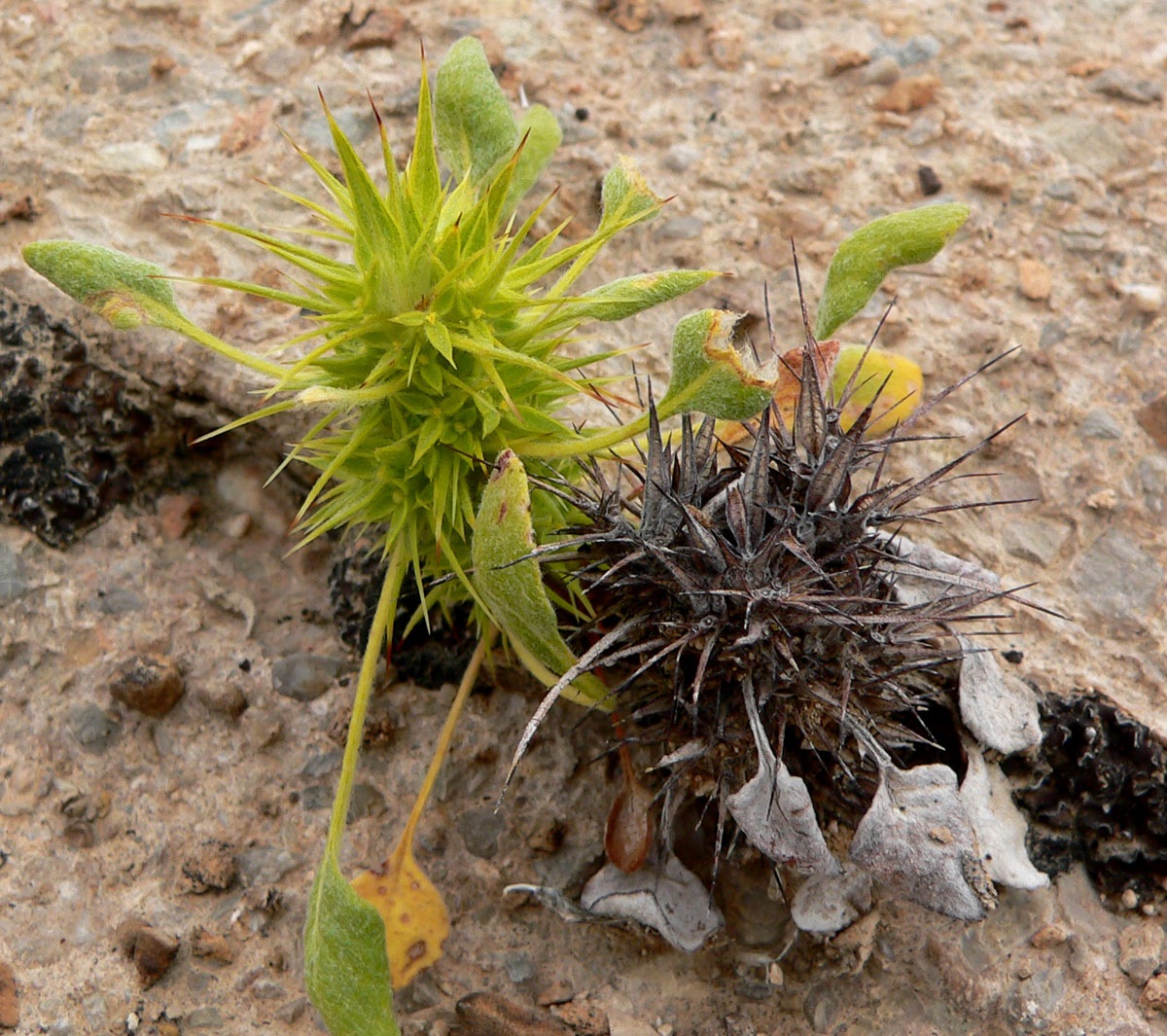

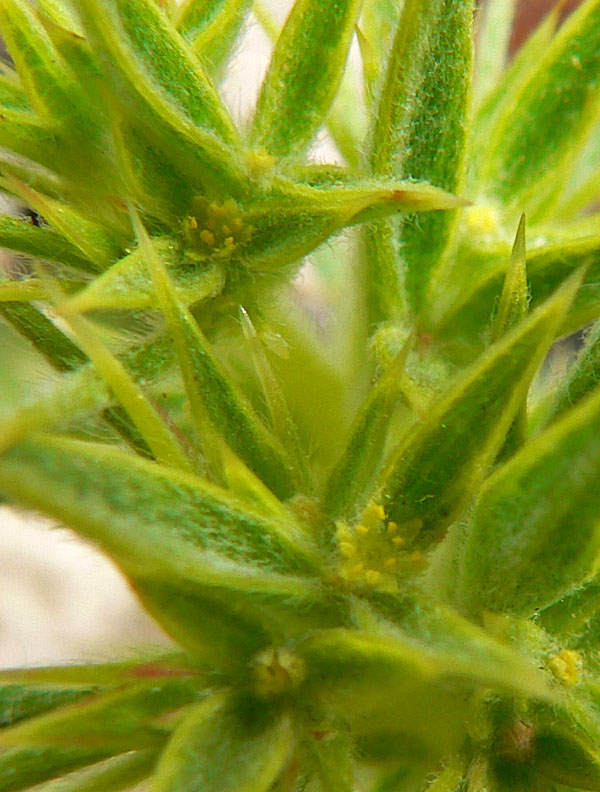
