= Chorizanthe angustifolia =

Conservation status
- Imperiled (NatureServe)

Scientific classification
- Kingdom: Plantae
- Clade: Tracheophytes
- Clade: Angiosperms
- Clade: Eudicots
- Order: Caryophyllales
- Family: Polygonaceae
- Genus: Chorizanthe
- Species: C. angustifolia

Binomial name
- Chorizanthe angustifolia Nutt.

Species of flowering plant

Chorizanthe angustifolia is a species of flowering plant in the buckwheat family known by the common name narrowleaf spineflower.

It is endemic to California, where it is known only from the coastline of San Luis Obispo and Santa Barbara Counties, but is locally common.

== Description ==
Chorizanthe angustifolia is small, hairy herb.

It sends out prostrate inflorescences along the sandy soil of its habitat, each no longer than about 10 centimeters. The inflorescence is a headlike cluster of several pink flowers, each surrounded by six bracts tipped in hooked spines. The flower itself is only 2 or 3 millimeters wide and white to pink in color.
