= Chorizanthe palmeri =

Scientific classification
- Kingdom: Plantae
- Clade: Tracheophytes
- Clade: Angiosperms
- Clade: Eudicots
- Order: Caryophyllales
- Family: Polygonaceae
- Genus: Chorizanthe
- Species: C. palmeri

Binomial name
- Chorizanthe palmeri S.Wats.

Species of flowering plant

Chorizanthe palmeri is a species of flowering plant in the buckwheat family known by the common name Palmer's spineflower. It is endemic to California, where it is known only from the Central Coast Ranges of western Monterey and San Luis Obispo Counties.

It grows on mountain slopes of serpentine soils. This herb is variable in appearance, with isolated populations often appearing quite different from one another, but not different enough to be considered separate taxa. In general, it is an erect plant growing up to 40 centimeters tall. The stem, leaves, bracts, and flowers can all be reddish to decidedly purple-red in color, and when a good-sized population is in bloom it can be spotted even from aircraft as a mark of red against an otherwise brownish hillside landscape. The inflorescence is a cluster of flowers surrounded by six red or purple bracts with hooked awns. The flower is a few millimeters across and is red or purple with a white or yellow throat.
