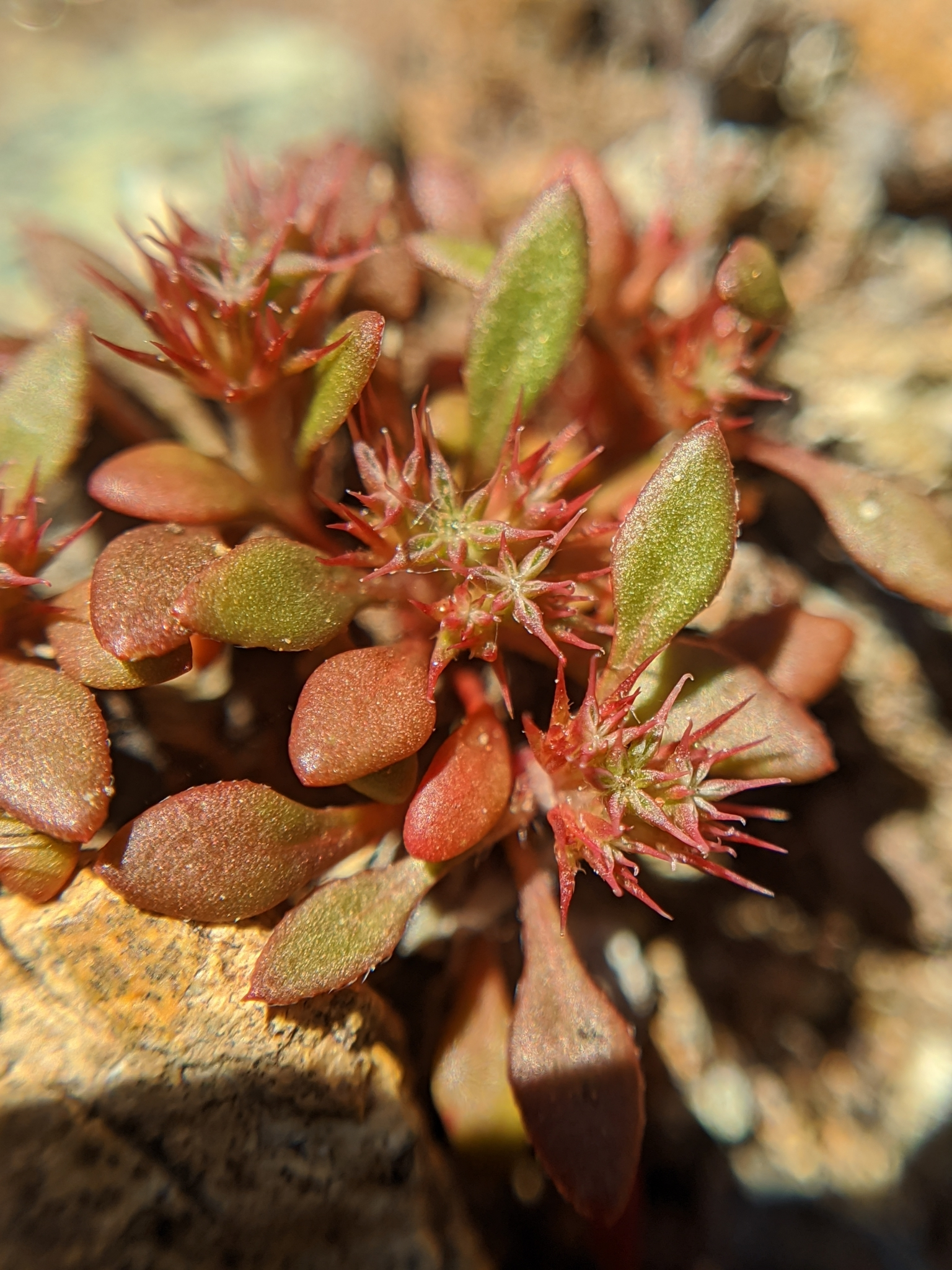

Scientific classification
- Kingdom: Plantae
- Clade: Tracheophytes
- Clade: Angiosperms
- Clade: Eudicots
- Order: Caryophyllales
- Family: Polygonaceae
- Genus: Chorizanthe
- Species: C. aphanantha

Binomial name
- Chorizanthe aphanantha K.M.Nelson & D.J.Keil

= Chorizanthe aphanantha =

Species of plant

Chorizanthe aphanantha is a critically endangered species of flowering plant in the family Polygonaceae with the common name Irish Hills Spineflower. It is endemic to the Irish Hills in San Luis Obispo County California.

== Description ==
Chorizanthe aphanantha is a low-growing tufted or mat-forming plant up to 26 cm in diameter. Stems branch from the base and are usually prostrate, each bearing a spoon-shaped leaf that is 4-8 mm long and 0.6-5 mm wide and glabrous or covered with tiny hairs. Tiny white flowers are born on short thick hairy basal stems, but are most often apparent from the spiny red and green involucre (floral bract) and fruiting structure that persists after the white petals drop.

== Range and habitat ==
Chorizanthe aphanantha grows in chaparral, usually on serpentine soils in the Irish Hills in San Luis Obispo County California.
