= Chorizanthe biloba =

Conservation status
- Vulnerable (NatureServe)

Scientific classification
- Kingdom: Plantae
- Clade: Tracheophytes
- Clade: Angiosperms
- Clade: Eudicots
- Order: Caryophyllales
- Family: Polygonaceae
- Genus: Chorizanthe
- Species: C. biloba

Binomial name
- Chorizanthe biloba Nutt.

Species of flowering plant

Chorizanthe biloba is a species of flowering plant in the buckwheat family known by the common name twolobe spineflower. It is endemic to California, where it is known only from the Central Coast Ranges. There are two varieties, both of which are uncommon to rare.

C. b. var. biloba is known from several areas of the Central Coast Ranges, including the foothills of the Santa Lucia Mountains and Diablo Range. It grows erect up to 40 centimeters tall. It produces an inflorescence of several flowers, each surrounded by six bracts tipped in hooked spines. The tiny flower has deeply notched or jagged tepals.

The rare C. b. var. immemora, the Hernandez spineflower, is known from only about five occurrences near the border between San Benito and Monterey Counties. It is similar to var. biloba but has more shallow notches in its tepals.
