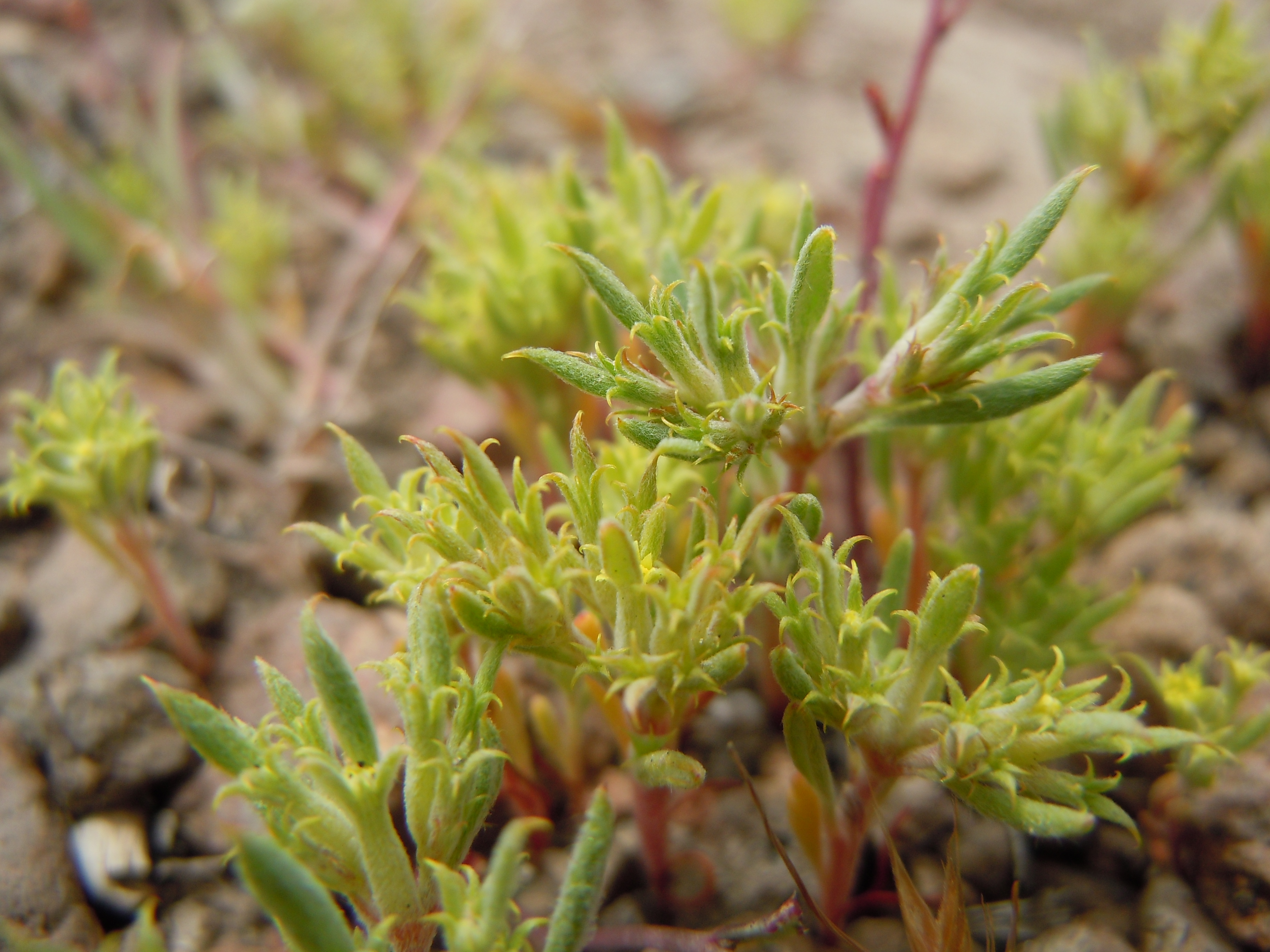

Scientific classification
- Kingdom: Plantae
- Clade: Tracheophytes
- Clade: Angiosperms
- Clade: Eudicots
- Order: Caryophyllales
- Family: Polygonaceae
- Genus: Chorizanthe
- Species: C. watsonii

Binomial name
- Chorizanthe watsonii Torr. & A.Gray

= Chorizanthe watsonii =

Species of flowering plant

Chorizanthe watsonii (kor-i-ZAN-the WAT-son-ee-eye) is a species of flowering plant in the buckwheat family known by the common name Fivetooth Spineflower or Watson's Spineflower. They are an annual herb native to the western United States including Idaho, California, Oregon, Nevada, Utah, Washington and Arizona, namely the Mojave Desert which runs through many of them.

== Habitat and description ==
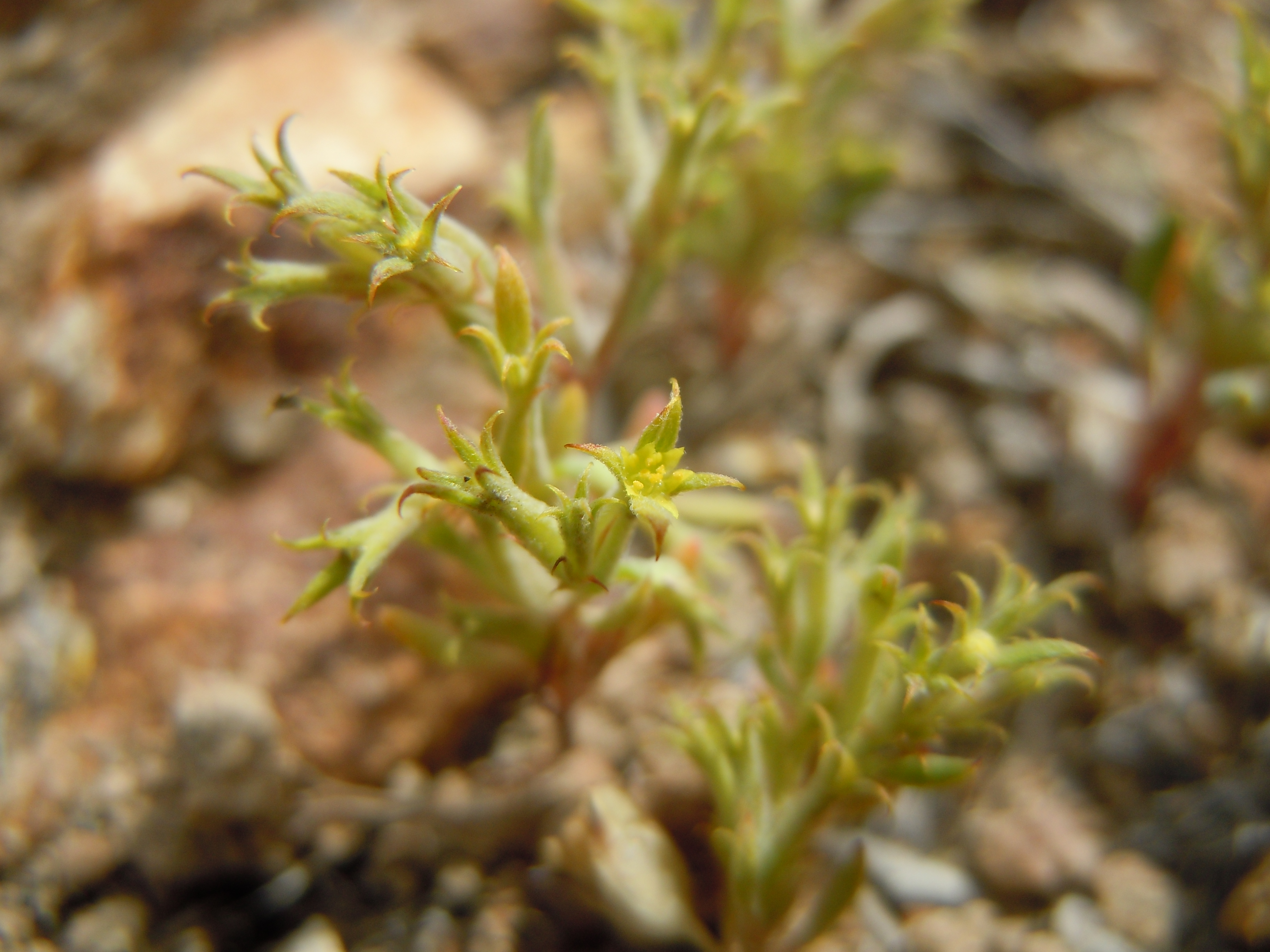
Chorizanthe watsonii's small yellow flowers shown clearly surrounded by its five bracts.

It grows in many types of desert plant communities, in areas of sandy to gravelly flats and slopes and mixed grassland including Pinyon-Juniper woodland, Joshua Tree woodland, and sagebrush scrub. The warmer northern Mojave Desert and the cold Great Basin Desert finds them widely distributed at elevations of 300–2400m.

This small plant grows a woolly erect stem up to about 2-15 centimeters tall with leaves 3-20mm in length. The inflorescence is a cluster of flowers surrounded by five hairy greenish to reddish bracts tipped with hooked awns 1–2 mm in length. The flower is 0.5–1 cm in diameter and yellow in color and grow from April/May to July/August in the USA's summer months. Specimens observed in the northern areas of the range, (such as the south-east Washington's Palouse Prairies) usually have three stamens.
