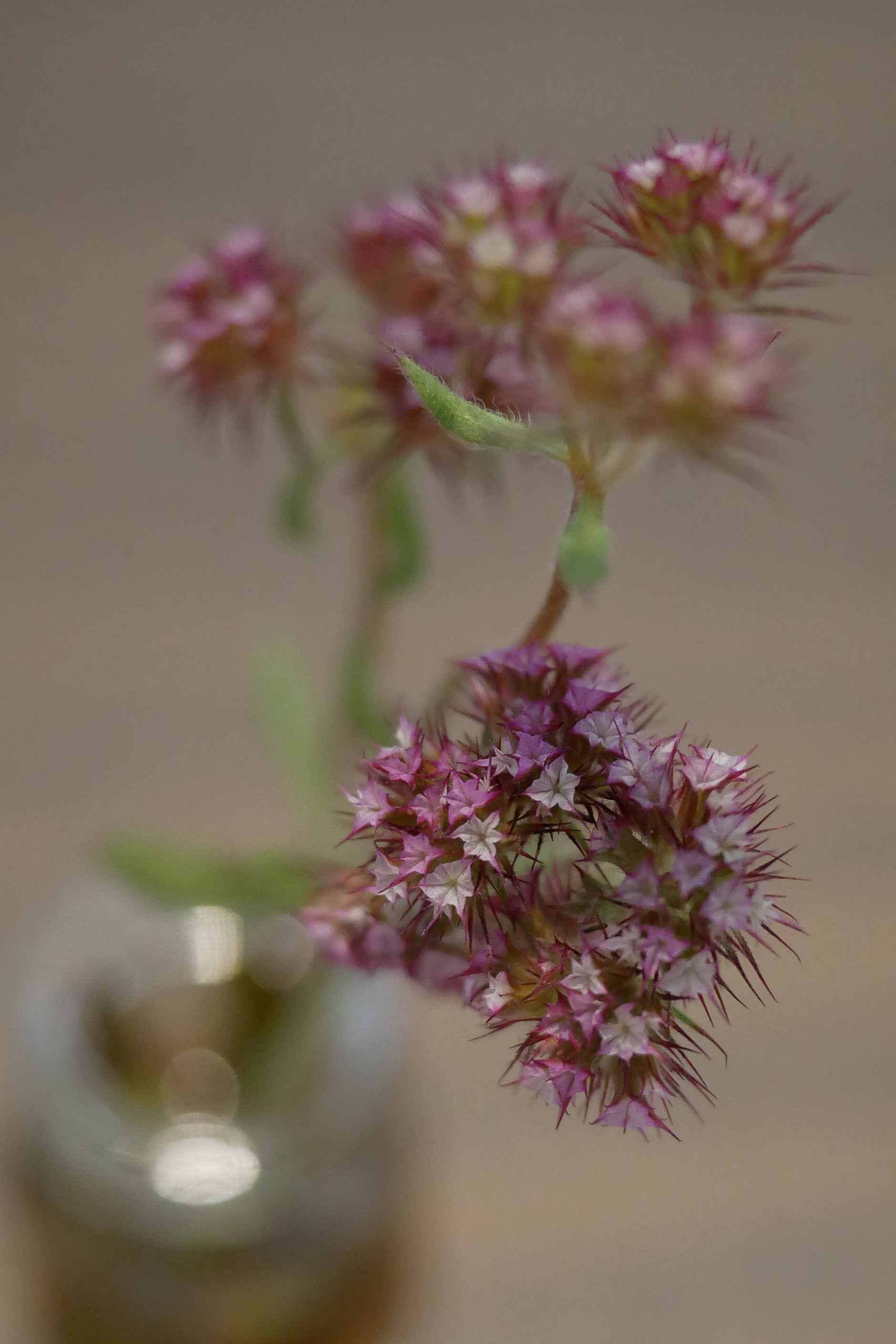

Scientific classification
- Kingdom: Plantae
- Clade: Tracheophytes
- Clade: Angiosperms
- Clade: Eudicots
- Order: Caryophyllales
- Family: Polygonaceae
- Genus: Chorizanthe
- Species: C. douglasii

Binomial name
- Chorizanthe douglasii Benth.

Synonyms
- Chorizanthe nortonii

= Chorizanthe douglasii =

Species of flowering plant

Chorizanthe douglasii is a species of flowering plant in the buckwheat family known by the common names San Benito spineflower and Douglas' spineflower. It is endemic to California, where it grows in the mountains of the Southern California Coast Ranges, from the Santa Lucia Range east to the Gabilan Range.

== Description ==
It is an erect herb producing a hairy stem up to about half a meter in maximum height. The leaves are up to 4 centimeters long and mainly arranged about the base of the plant, with a whorl of leaves at the middle of the stem as well. The inflorescence is a cluster of flowers, each surrounded by six purple to bright pink bracts which may be all fused together. The bracts are tipped in straight awns. The flower itself is 3 or 4 millimeters wide and white or pink in color.
