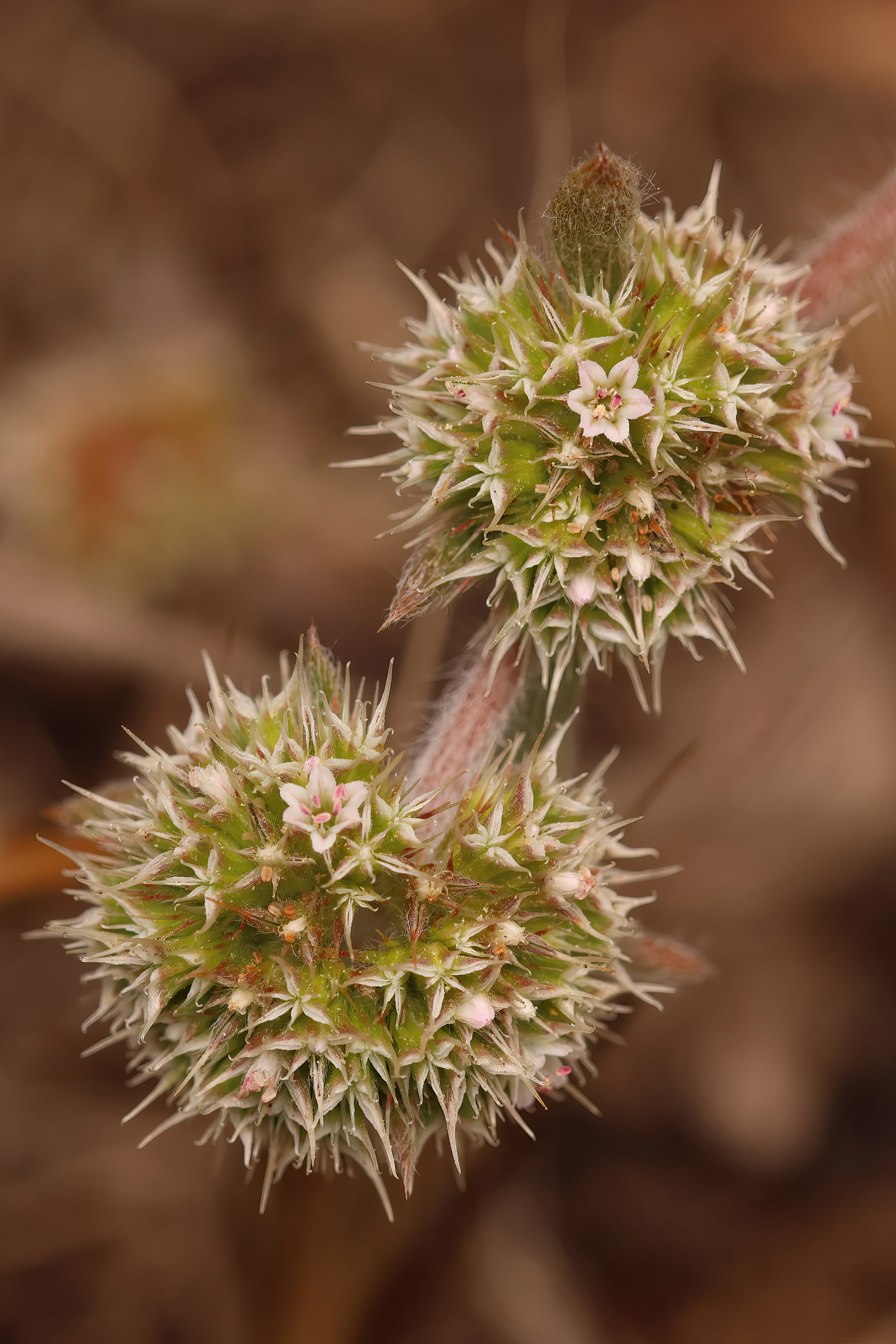
- Chorizanthe cuspidata var. villosa in Point Reyes

Conservation status
- Imperiled (NatureServe)

Scientific classification
- Kingdom: Plantae
- Clade: Tracheophytes
- Clade: Angiosperms
- Clade: Eudicots
- Order: Caryophyllales
- Family: Polygonaceae
- Genus: Chorizanthe
- Species: C. cuspidata

Binomial name
- Chorizanthe cuspidata S.Wats.

= Chorizanthe cuspidata =

Species of flowering plant

Chorizanthe cuspidata is a species of flowering plant in the buckwheat family known by the common name San Francisco spineflower. It is endemic to California, where it is known only from the San Francisco Bay Area and to the immediate north and south. It grows in sandy coastal habitat.

== Description ==
The Chorizanthe cuspidata plant grows flat along the ground, its stems extending up to about half a meter in length. The leaves are located about the base of the stem and are generally oval in shape and up to 5 centimeters long. The herbage is hairy to woolly in texture and green to reddish in color.

The inflorescence is a dense cluster of cylindrical flowers, each bordered by white or pink bracts with hooked or straight spines at the tips. The flower itself is 2 or 3 millimeters long, white or pink, and hairy. The minute tepals are lobed, with the central lobe longest and coming to a point.

Varieties

There are two varieties of this species:

- Chorizanthe cuspidata var. cuspidata is quite rare due to its Bay Area habitat having been mostly consumed for development.
- Chorizanthe cuspidata var. villosa can be found in the protected habitat of Point Reyes National Seashore.
