= Chorizanthe obovata =

Conservation status
- Vulnerable (NatureServe)

Scientific classification
- Kingdom: Plantae
- Clade: Tracheophytes
- Clade: Angiosperms
- Clade: Eudicots
- Order: Caryophyllales
- Family: Polygonaceae
- Genus: Chorizanthe
- Species: C. obovata

Binomial name
- Chorizanthe obovata Goodman

Species of flowering plant

Chorizanthe obovata is a species of flowering plant in the buckwheat family known by the common name spoonsepal spineflower. It is endemic to California, where it grows in the mountains of the Central Coast Range from Monterey to Santa Barbara Counties.

Chorizanthe obovata grows in chaparral and woodland habitat. The plant is variable in appearance, growing prostrate or erect, its stem up to 40 centimeters long. The herbage is red to gray-green in color and hairy in texture. The inflorescence is a cluster of flowers surrounded by six bracts, each tipped with hooked awns except the longest, which may have a straight awn. The flower itself is 4 or 5 millimeters wide and white to pinkish in color.
