= Chorizanthe polygonoides =

Scientific classification
- Kingdom: Plantae
- Clade: Tracheophytes
- Clade: Angiosperms
- Clade: Eudicots
- Order: Caryophyllales
- Family: Polygonaceae
- Genus: Chorizanthe
- Species: C. polygonoides

Binomial name
- Chorizanthe polygonoides Torr. & A.Gray

Species of flowering plant

Chorizanthe polygonoides is a species of flowering plant in the buckwheat family known by the common name knotweed spineflower. It is native to California and Baja California, where it grows widely scattered in many types of habitat. It is a petite plant taking a prostrate form with stems just a few centimeters long at maximum. It may be green to red in color and is hairy in texture. The leaves are no more than a centimeter long and the flower is under two millimeters wide. The minute flower is surrounded by three hairy point-tipped bracts.
