= Chorizanthe procumbens =

Scientific classification
- Kingdom: Plantae
- Clade: Tracheophytes
- Clade: Angiosperms
- Clade: Eudicots
- Order: Caryophyllales
- Family: Polygonaceae
- Genus: Chorizanthe
- Species: C. procumbens

Binomial name
- Chorizanthe procumbens Torr. & A.Gray

Species of flowering plant

Chorizanthe procumbens is a species of flowering plant in the buckwheat family known by the common name prostrate spineflower. It is native to California and Baja California, where it grows in scrub and chaparral habitat. It is variable in appearance, up to 25 centimeters long or much shorter, usually growing prostrate along the ground. It is often yellowish green in color but there are grayish and reddish forms. The inflorescence is a cluster of flowers with each minute white or yellow flower surrounded by spine-tipped bracts.
