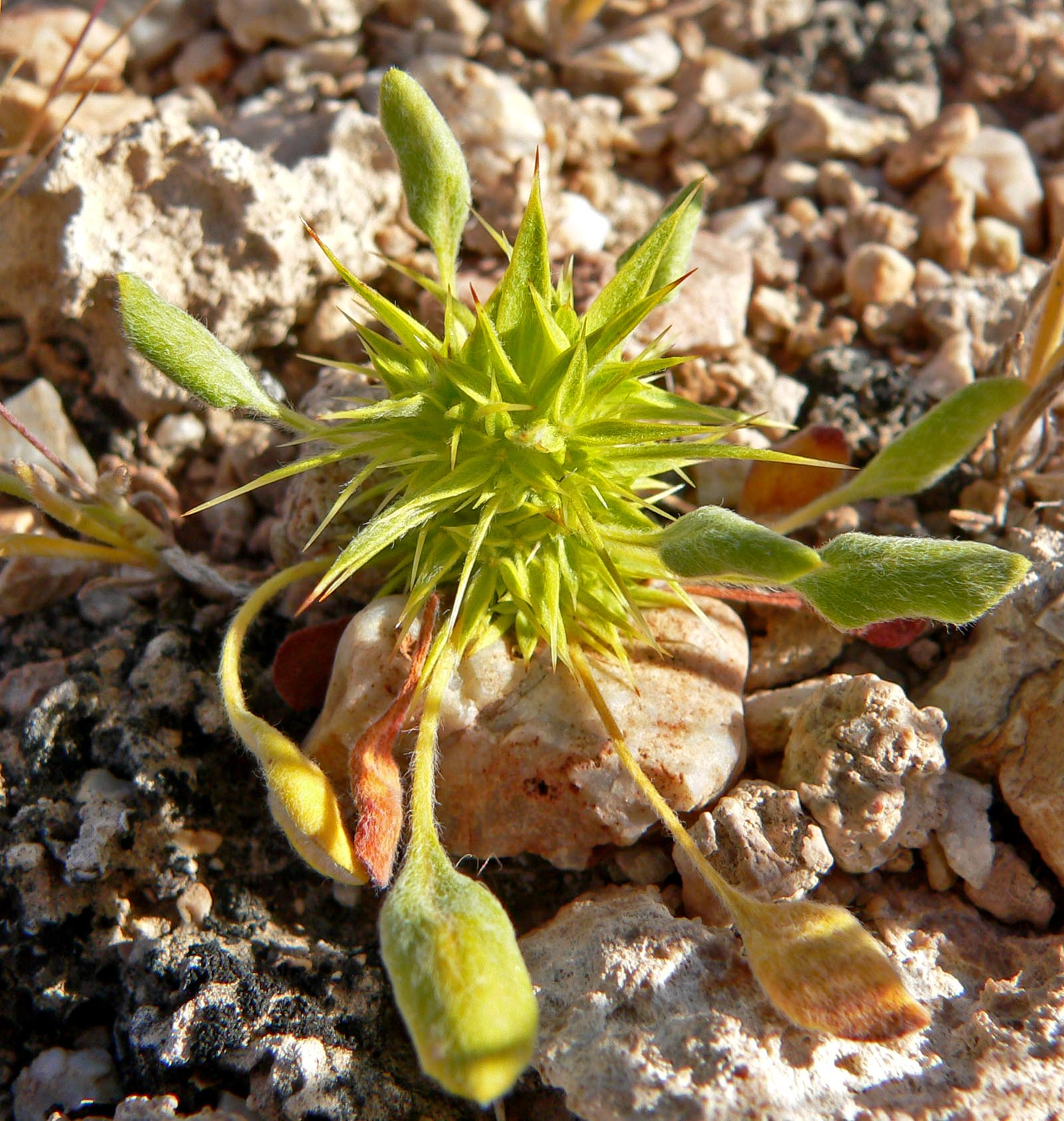
- Rigid spineflower (C. rigida)

Scientific classification
- Kingdom: Plantae
- Clade: Tracheophytes
- Clade: Angiosperms
- Clade: Eudicots
- Order: Caryophyllales
- Family: Polygonaceae
- Subfamily: Eriogonoideae
- Genus: Chorizanthe; R.Br. ex Bentham

Species
- 61, see text

Synonyms
- Acanthogonum Torr.; Eriogonella Goodman; Trigonocarpus Bertero ex Steud.

= Chorizanthe =

Genus of flowering plants

Chorizanthe is a genus of plants in the buckwheat family known generally as spineflowers. These are small, squat, herbaceous plants with spiny-looking inflorescences of flowers. The flowers may be in shades of red or yellow to white. The bracts are pointed and sometimes tipped with a hooked awn, and the inflorescence often dries into a rounded, spiny husk. Spineflowers are found in western North America and South America.

The word Chorizanthe comes from the Greek roots chorizo and anthos meaning "to divide," and "flower," thus meaning "divided flowers," but actually used in reference to the divided calyx.

== Species ==
61 species are accepted.

- Chorizanthe angustifolia Nutt. – narrowleaf spineflower
- Chorizanthe aphanantha K.M.Nelson & D.J.Keil
- Chorizanthe biloba Goodman – twolobe spineflower
- Chorizanthe blakleyi Hardham – Blakley's spineflower
- Chorizanthe brevicornu Torr. – brittle spineflower
- Chorizanthe breweri S.Watson – San Luis Obispo spineflower
- Chorizanthe clevelandii Parry
- Chorizanthe commissuralis J.Rémy
- Chorizanthe corrugata (Torr.) Torr. & A.Gray – wrinkled spineflower
- Chorizanthe cuspidata S.Watson – San Francisco spineflower
- Chorizanthe dasyantha Phil.
- Chorizanthe diffusa Benth. – diffuse spineflower
- Chorizanthe douglasii Benth. – San Benito spineflower
- Chorizanthe eastwoodiae (Goodman) D.Gowen & L.A.Johnson
- Chorizanthe fimbriata Nutt. – fringed spineflower
- Chorizanthe flava Brandegee
- Chorizanthe flavescens Phil.
- Chorizanthe frankenioides J.Rémy
- Chorizanthe gajardoi Teillier & J.Macaya
- Chorizanthe glabrescens Benth.
- Chorizanthe howellii Goodman – Mendocino spineflower
- Chorizanthe inequalis Stokes
- Chorizanthe interposita Goodman
- Chorizanthe kingii Phil.
- Chorizanthe leptotheca Goodman – Ramona spineflower
- Chorizanthe macraei Benth.
- Chorizanthe membranacea Benth. – pink spineflower
- Chorizanthe mieresii Teillier & J.Macaya
- Chorizanthe minutiflora R.Morgan, Styer & Reveal
- Chorizanthe mutabilis Brandegee
- Chorizanthe navasiae Teillier & J.Macaya
- Chorizanthe novoana Teillier & J.Macaya
- Chorizanthe obovata Goodman – spoonsepal spineflower
- Chorizanthe orcuttiana Parry – San Diego spineflower
- Chorizanthe palmeri S.Watson – Palmer's spineflower
- Chorizanthe paniculata Benth.
- Chorizanthe parryi S.Watson – San Bernardino spineflower
- Chorizanthe peduncularis Benth.
- Chorizanthe polygonoides A.Gray – knotweed spineflower
- Chorizanthe procumbens Nutt. – prostrate spineflower
- Chorizanthe pulchella Brandegee
- Chorizanthe pungens Benth. – Monterey spineflower
- Chorizanthe rectispina Goodman – prickly spineflower
- Chorizanthe rigida (Torr.) Torr. & A.Gray – devil's spineflower, rigid spineflower
- Chorizanthe robusta Parry – robust spineflower
- Chorizanthe rosasii Teillier & J.Macaya
- Chorizanthe rosulenta Reveal
- Chorizanthe spinosa S.Watson – Mojave spineflower
- Chorizanthe staticoides Benth. – Turkish rugging
- Chorizanthe stellulata Benth. – starlet spineflower
- Chorizanthe turbinata Wiggins
- Chorizanthe uniaristata Torr. & A.Gray – one-awned spineflower
- Chorizanthe vaginata Benth.
- Chorizanthe valida S.Watson – Sonoma spineflower
- Chorizanthe ventricosa Goodman – Priest Valley spineflower
- Chorizanthe virgata Benth.
- Chorizanthe viridis Phil.
- Chorizanthe watsonii A.Gray – fivetooth spineflower
- Chorizanthe wheeleri S.Watson – Santa Barbara spineflower
- Chorizanthe xanti S.Watson – Riverside spineflower
