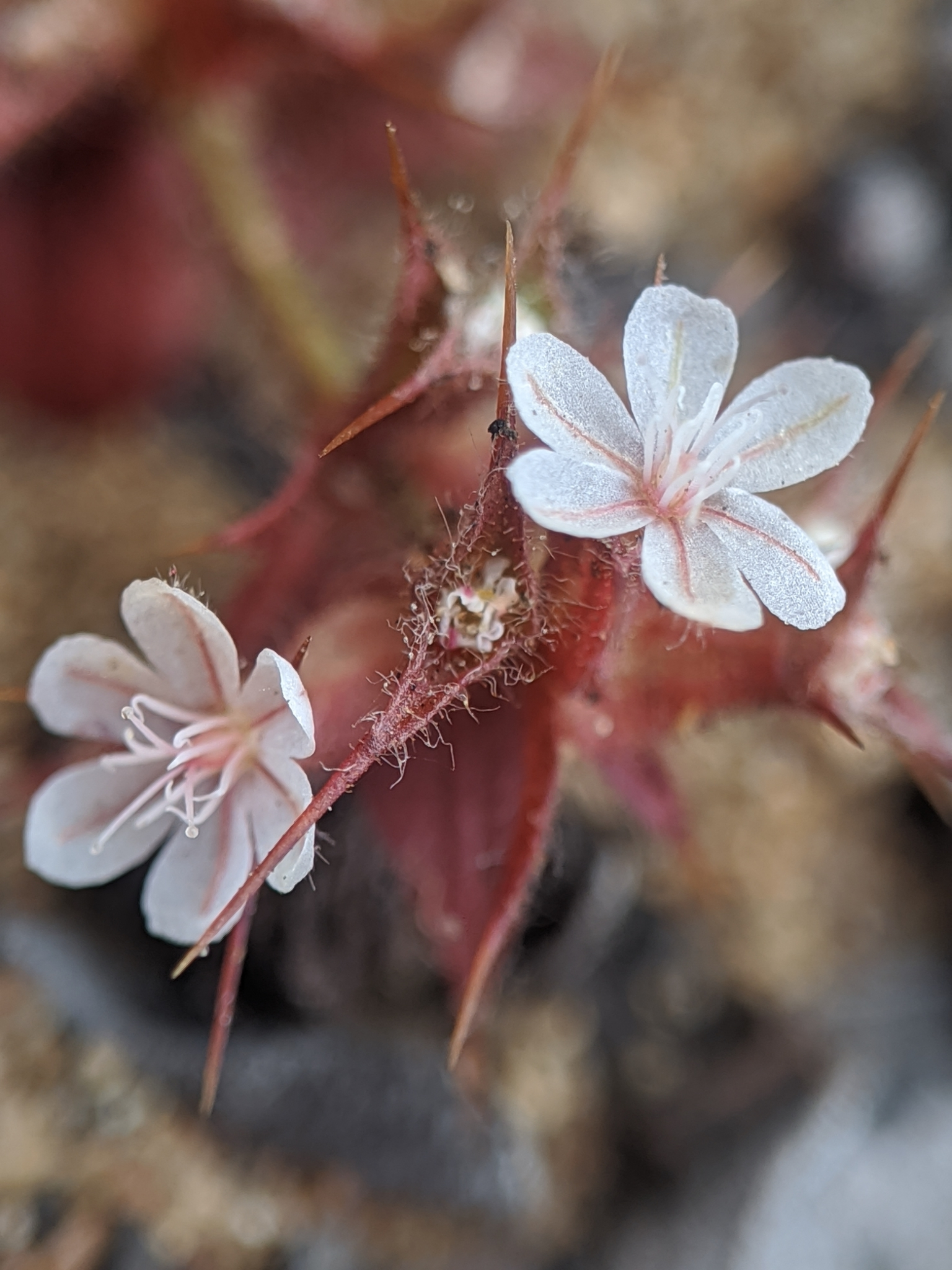

Conservation status
- Vulnerable (NatureServe)

Scientific classification
- Kingdom: Plantae
- Clade: Tracheophytes
- Clade: Angiosperms
- Clade: Eudicots
- Order: Caryophyllales
- Family: Polygonaceae
- Genus: Mucronea
- Species: M. californica

Binomial name
- Mucronea californica Bentham

Synonyms
- Chorizanthe californica (Benth.) A.Gray; Chorizanthe californica var. suksdorfii J.F.Macbr.; Mucronea californica var. suksdorfii (J.F.Macbr.) Goodman

= Mucronea californica =

Species of flower plant

Mucronea californica is a rare species of annual plant in the family Polygonaceae known by the common names California spineflower or California mucronea. An ephemeral plant found growing in the sandy microhabitats of coastal sage scrub, chaparral and dunes, this plant is threatened by the urbanization and development of its viable habitat and has been locally extirpated over much of its range. It has small, white to pink flowers that top inflorescences spined with awns.

== Description ==
An ephemeral annual plant, this species grows narrow leaves from a rosette, and develops a spiny, awn-covered inflorescence with white to pink flowers on the top.

=== Morphology ===
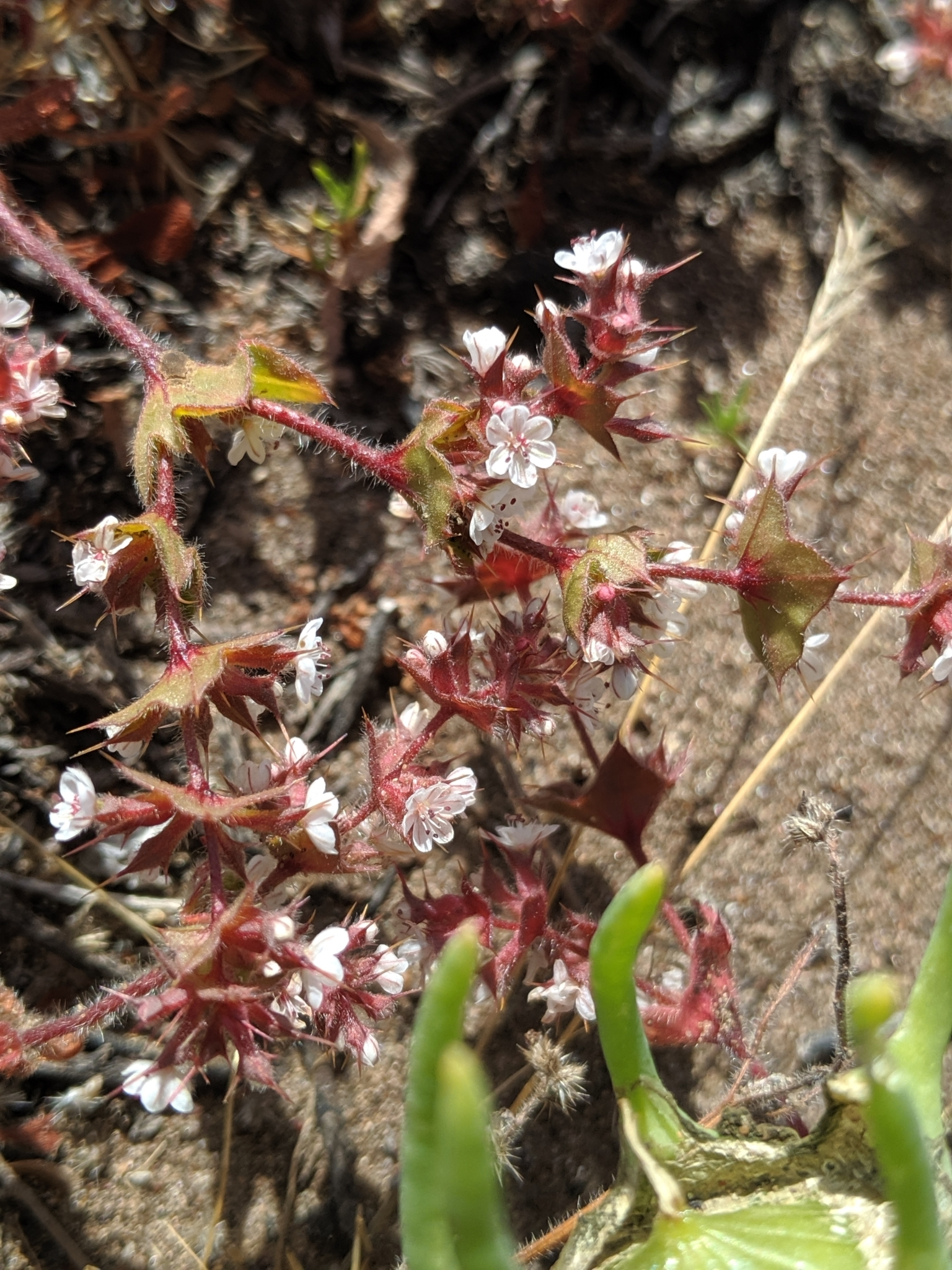
The inflorescence with flowers

This species grows 5 to 30 cm (2.0 to 11.8 in) by 10 to 60 cm (3.9 to 23.6 in) in diameter. The leaves form a basal rosette, attached to the plant via a petiole 0.5 to 3 cm (0.20 to 1.18 in) long. The leaves are shaped narrowly spatulate to obovate, measuring 1 to 5 cm (0.39 to 1.97 in) long by 2 to 8 mm (0.079 to 0.315 in).

The inflorescence is cyme-like. There are 3 bracts, which are spreading to nearly erect, and are connate for half of their length, shaped triangular to ovate or oblong. The bracts become acerose at the terminal nodes, and then linear to linear-lanceolate, 0.5 to 1 cm (0.20 to 0.39 in) long, with the apex acute to obtuse. The inflorescence is covered in awns, which are 1 to 2.5 mm (0.039 to 0.098 in) long.

The involucres are 3-angled and obscurely ribbed, with 3 teeth. Their surface is glandular to slightly hirsute, with awns 1 to 2.5 mm (0.039 to 0.098 in) long. Flowering is from March to August. The singular flowers have a perianth 1.5 to 2.5 mm (0.059 to 0.098 in) large, pubescent near the base on the lower surface. The tepals are oblong, with an entire apex. There are 6 to 9 stamens. The fruits are achenes 2 to 3 mm (0.079 to 0.118 in).

== Distribution and habitat ==
This species is endemic to California, and is found mostly on the Pacific Coast ranging from San Luis Obispo south to San Diego County, along with a number of locations inland from Monterey County to western Riverside County. It is found along sandy openings in a variety of habitats, from coastal sage scrub, chaparral communities, and dunes to sandy substrates in grasslands and pine-oak woodlands. It is threatened and in substantial decline from the extensive urbanization in southern California, which has made it locally extirpated over much of its historical range.

== Gallery ==
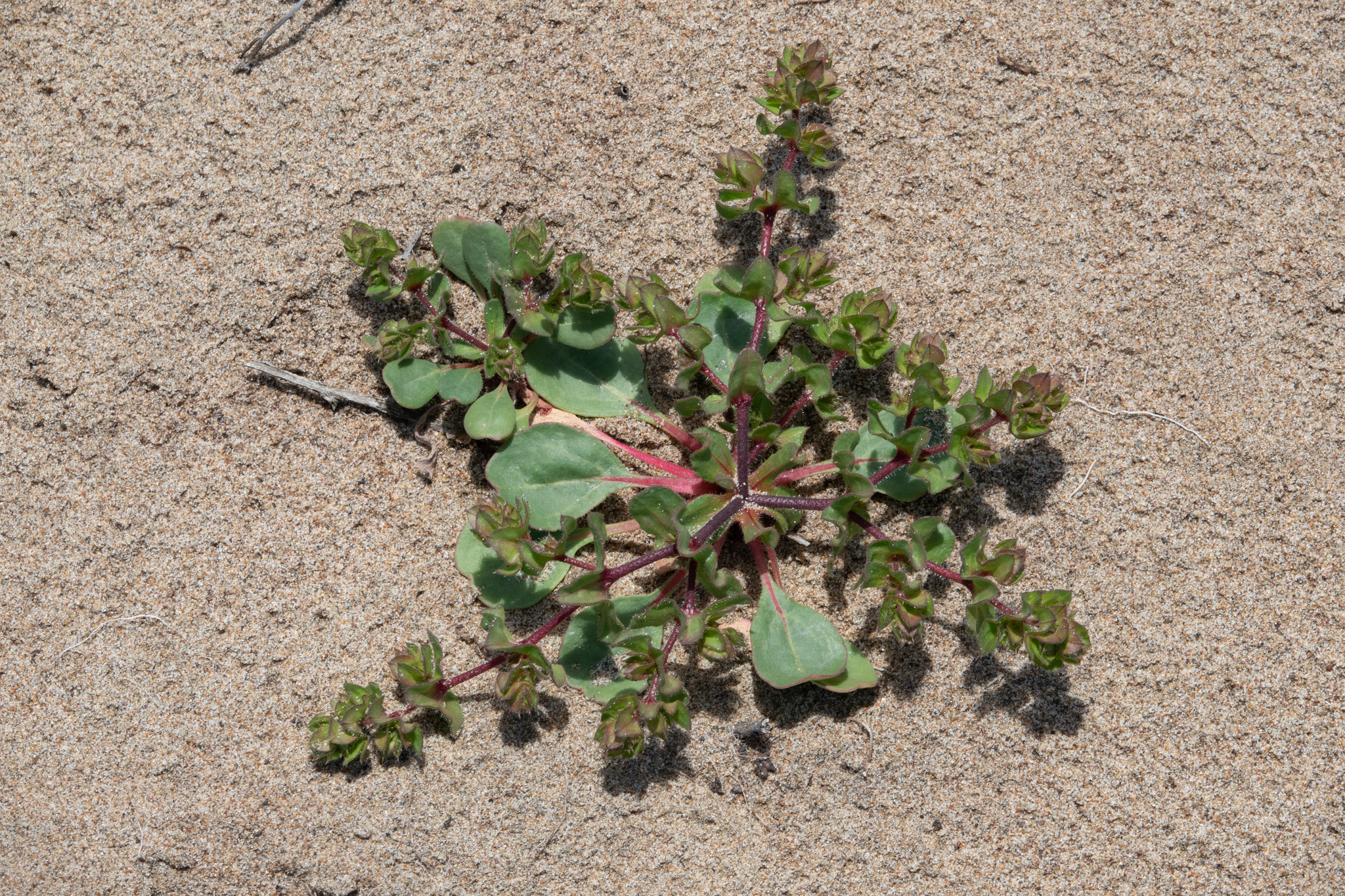
Growing in habitat, San Luis Obispo County

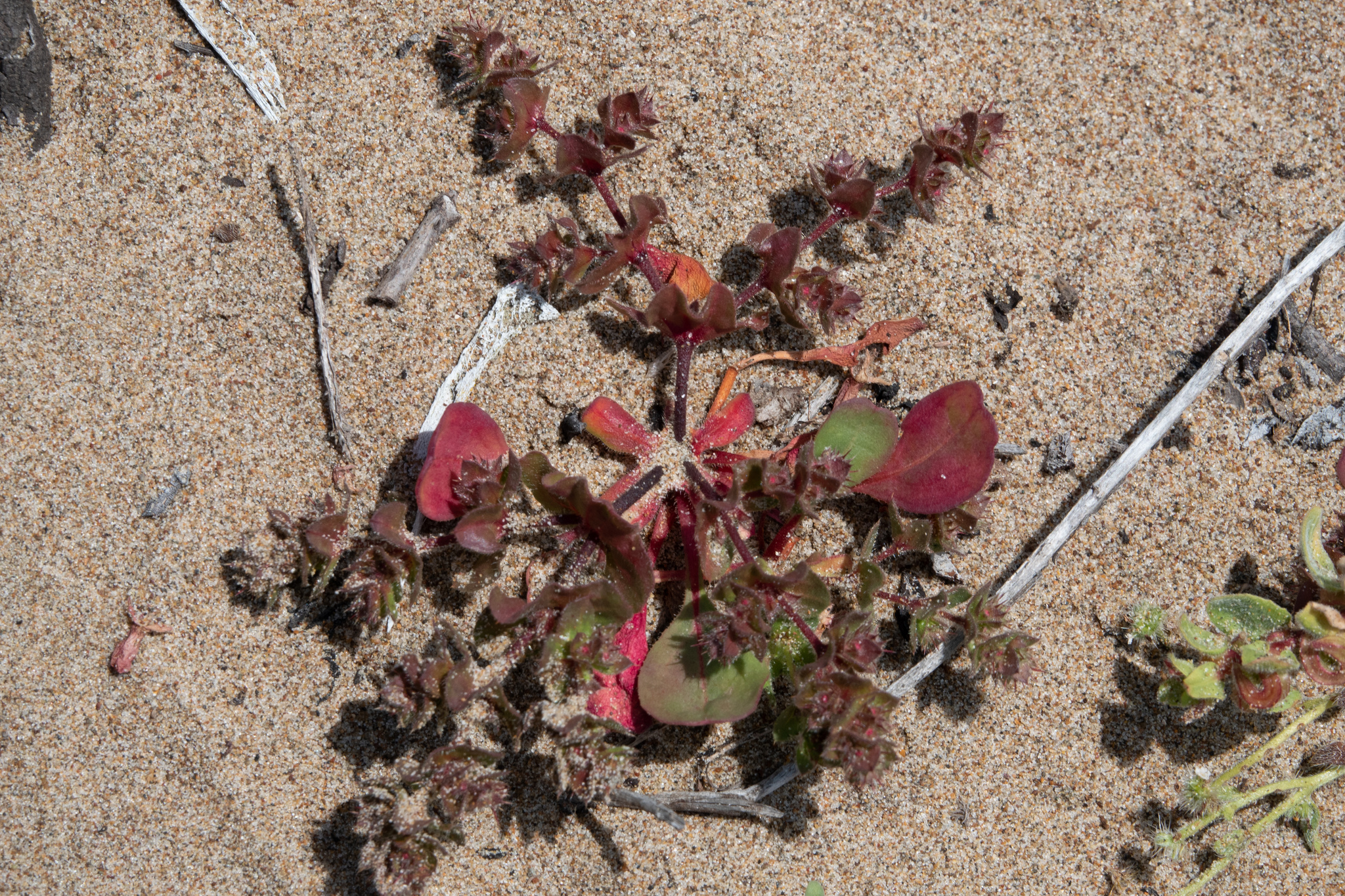
Growing in sand with developing inflorescences

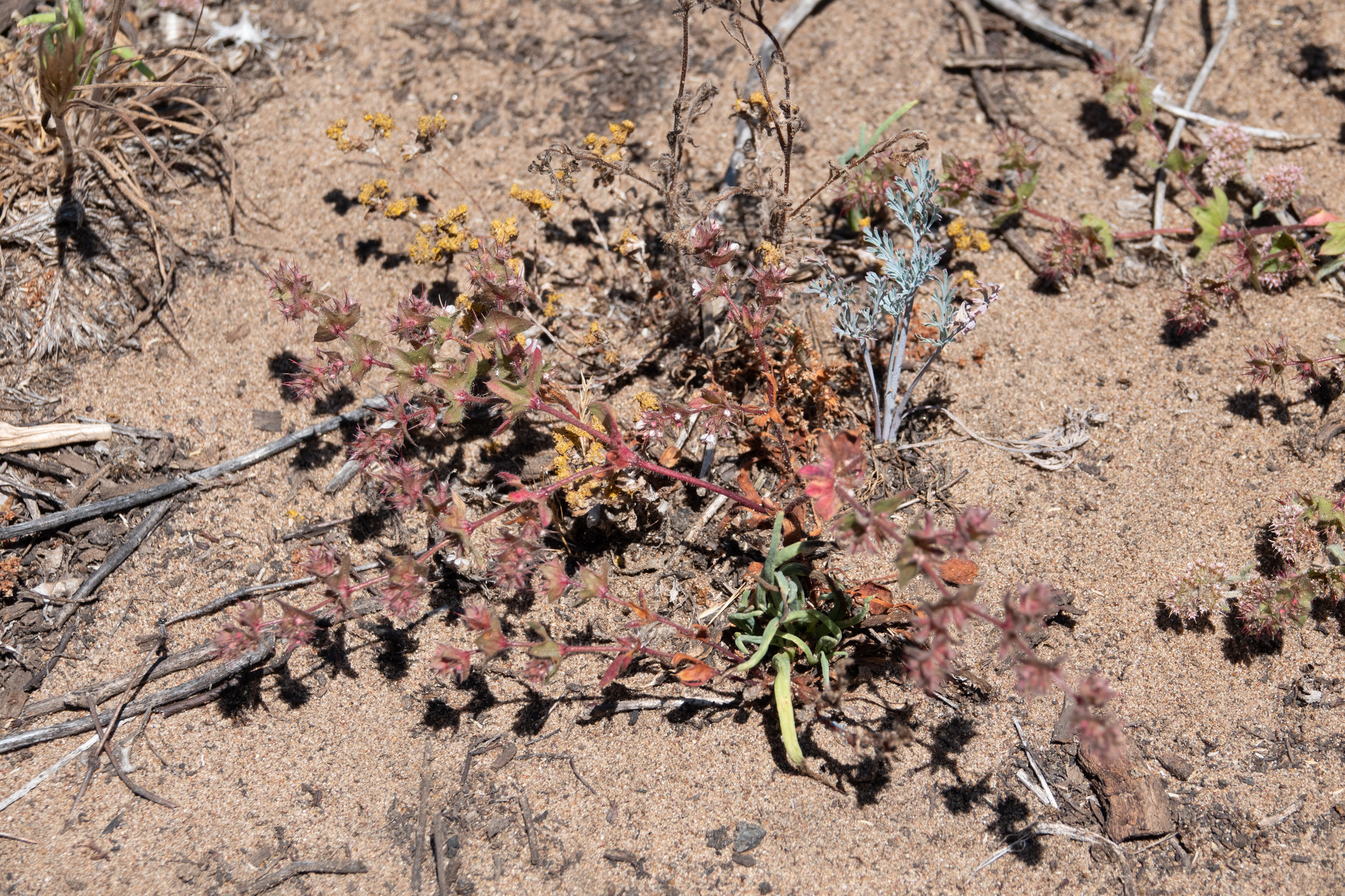
Note the spiny awns on the inflorescence

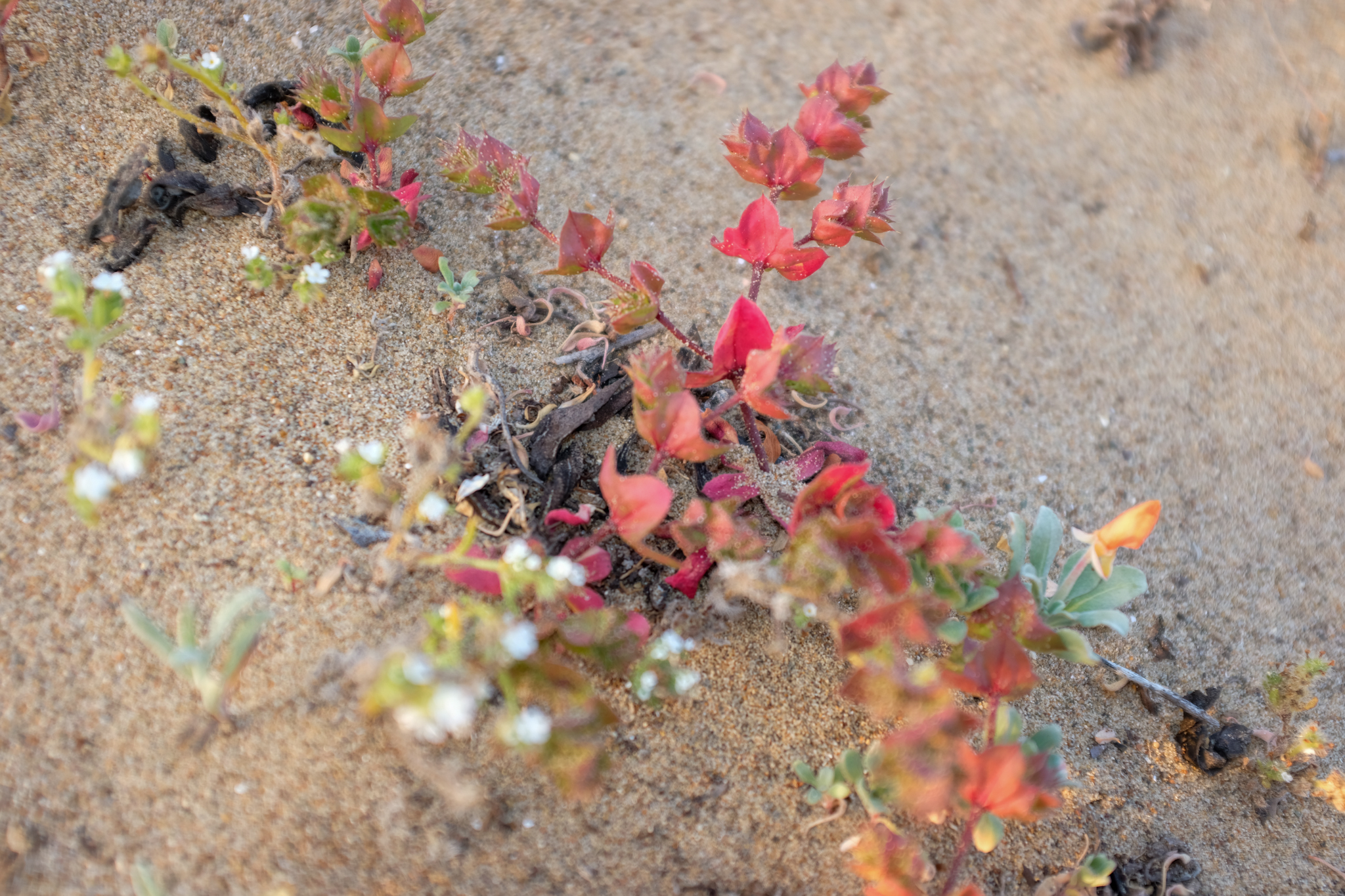
Growing in habitat, Morro Bay
