= Chorizanthe diffusa =

Conservation status
- Vulnerable (NatureServe)

Scientific classification
- Kingdom: Plantae
- Clade: Tracheophytes
- Clade: Angiosperms
- Clade: Eudicots
- Order: Caryophyllales
- Family: Polygonaceae
- Genus: Chorizanthe
- Species: C. diffusa

Binomial name
- Chorizanthe diffusa Benth.

Species of flowering plant

Chorizanthe diffusa is a species of flowering plant in the buckwheat family known by the common name diffuse spineflower. It is endemic to California, where it grows on the coastline and mountains of the Central Coast, in sandy scrub, woodland, and forest habitat. It is erect to prostrate in form, its stem generally no longer than 15 or 20 centimeters. The leaves are up to 2 centimeters long and mainly arranged about the base of the plant. The inflorescence is a cluster of flowers, each surrounded by six hook-tipped bracts. The margins of the bracts proximal to the long hooked tip may be very thin and nearly invisible to wide and obvious, and they may be green to white to purplish. The flower itself is about 3 millimeters wide and white with a yellow throat. The tips of its tepals may be smooth or jagged or toothed.
