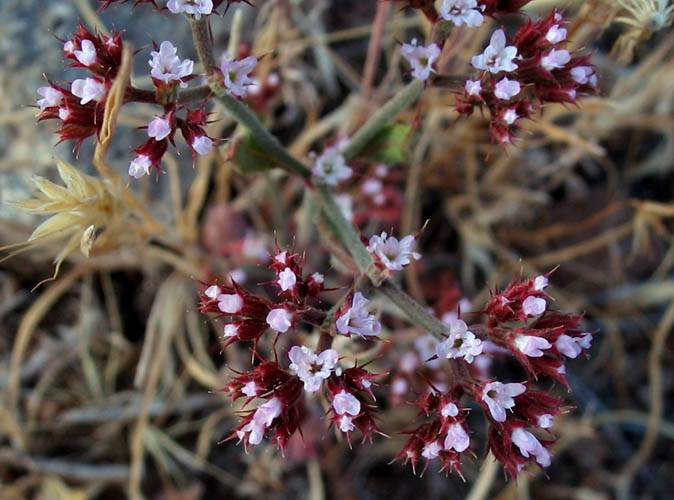

Scientific classification
- Kingdom: Plantae
- Clade: Tracheophytes
- Clade: Angiosperms
- Clade: Eudicots
- Order: Caryophyllales
- Family: Polygonaceae
- Genus: Chorizanthe
- Species: C. staticoides

Binomial name
- Chorizanthe staticoides Benth.

Synonyms
- Chorizanthe chrysacantha Chorizanthe discolor

= Chorizanthe staticoides =

Species of flowering plant

Chorizanthe staticoides is a species of flowering plant in the buckwheat family known by the common name Turkish rugging. It is endemic to California, where it is a common member of the flora in the chaparral and scrub habitats in a number of regions.

This is a plant which is quite variable in morphology, producing small patches on the ground or growing erect to heights over half a meter. The leaves measure from just a few millimeters to about 8 centimeters long. Most of them grow at the base of the fuzzy green or reddish stem. The top of the stem branches neatly into flat-topped inflorescences packed densely with tiny flowers. Each flower has a cylindrical base of six sharp-tipped bracts in shades of red to purple or green. Within this involucre is the pink to red flower which is a few millimeters wide and contains nine tiny stamens.
