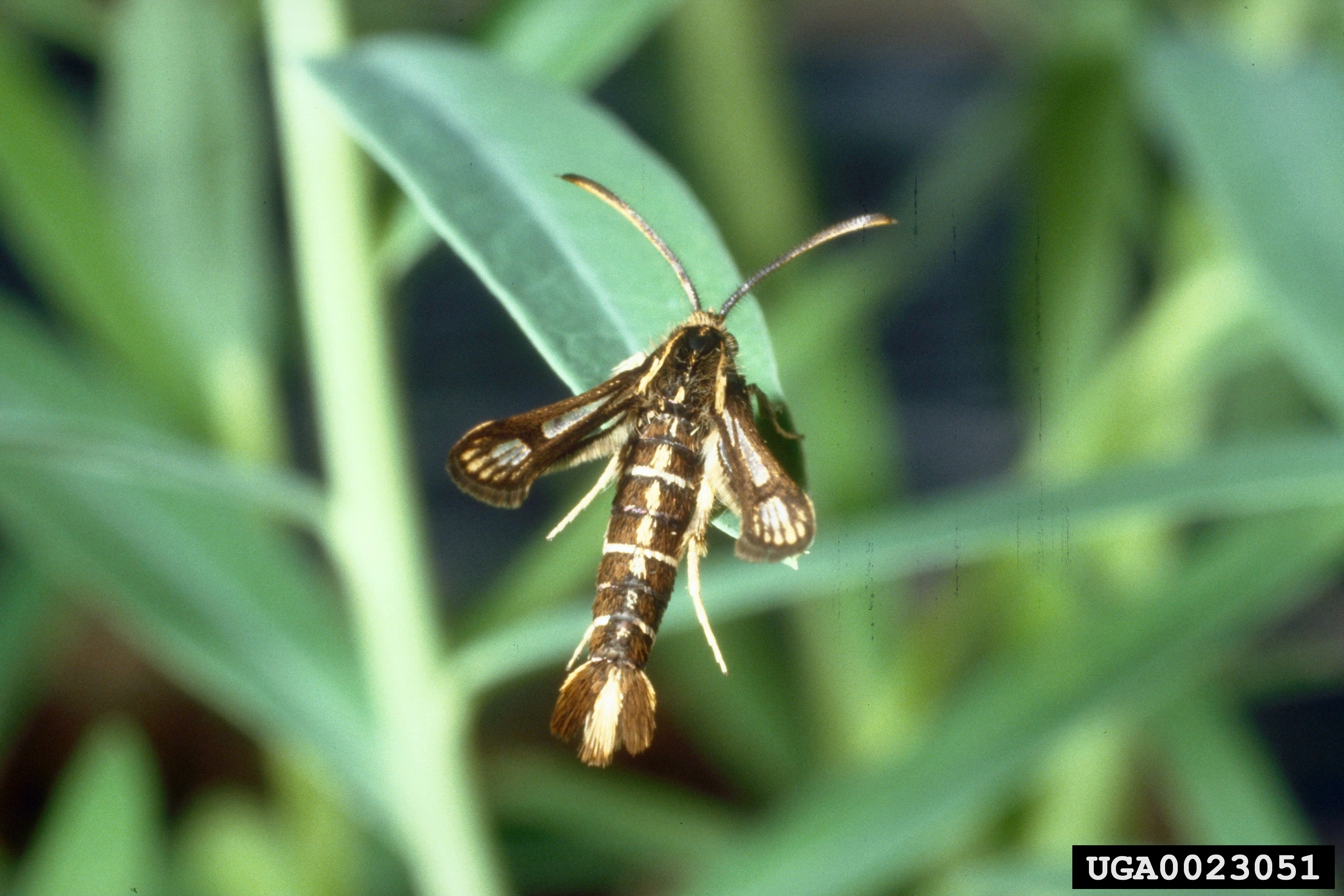

Scientific classification
- Kingdom: Animalia
- Phylum: Arthropoda
- Clade: Pancrustacea
- Class: Insecta
- Order: Lepidoptera
- Family: Sesiidae
- Genus: Chamaesphecia
- Subgenus: Chamaesphecia
- Species: C. crassicornis

Binomial name
- Chamaesphecia crassicornis Bartel, 1912

= Chamaesphecia crassicornis =

Species of moth

Chamaesphecia crassicornis is a moth of the family Sesiidae. It is found in south-eastern Austria, southern Slovakia, Hungary, Serbia, Romania, Bulgaria, southern Russia, Kazakhstan and Kyrgyzstan. It is rare in central Europe. It has been released in North America for the biological control of leafy spurge.

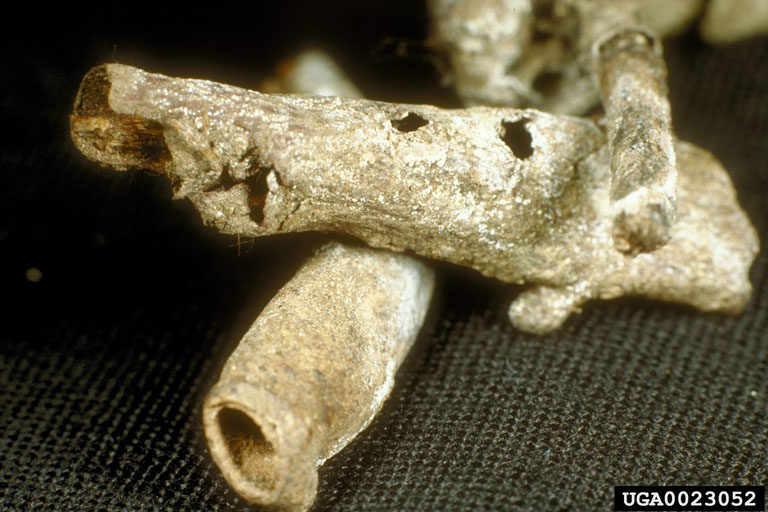
Damage

The wingspan is 16–22 mm. Adults are on wing in July.

The larvae feed on Euphorbia esula, Euphorbia incisa, Euphorbia cyparissias and to a lesser extent Euphorbia lathyris. They bore into the roots of their host plant.
