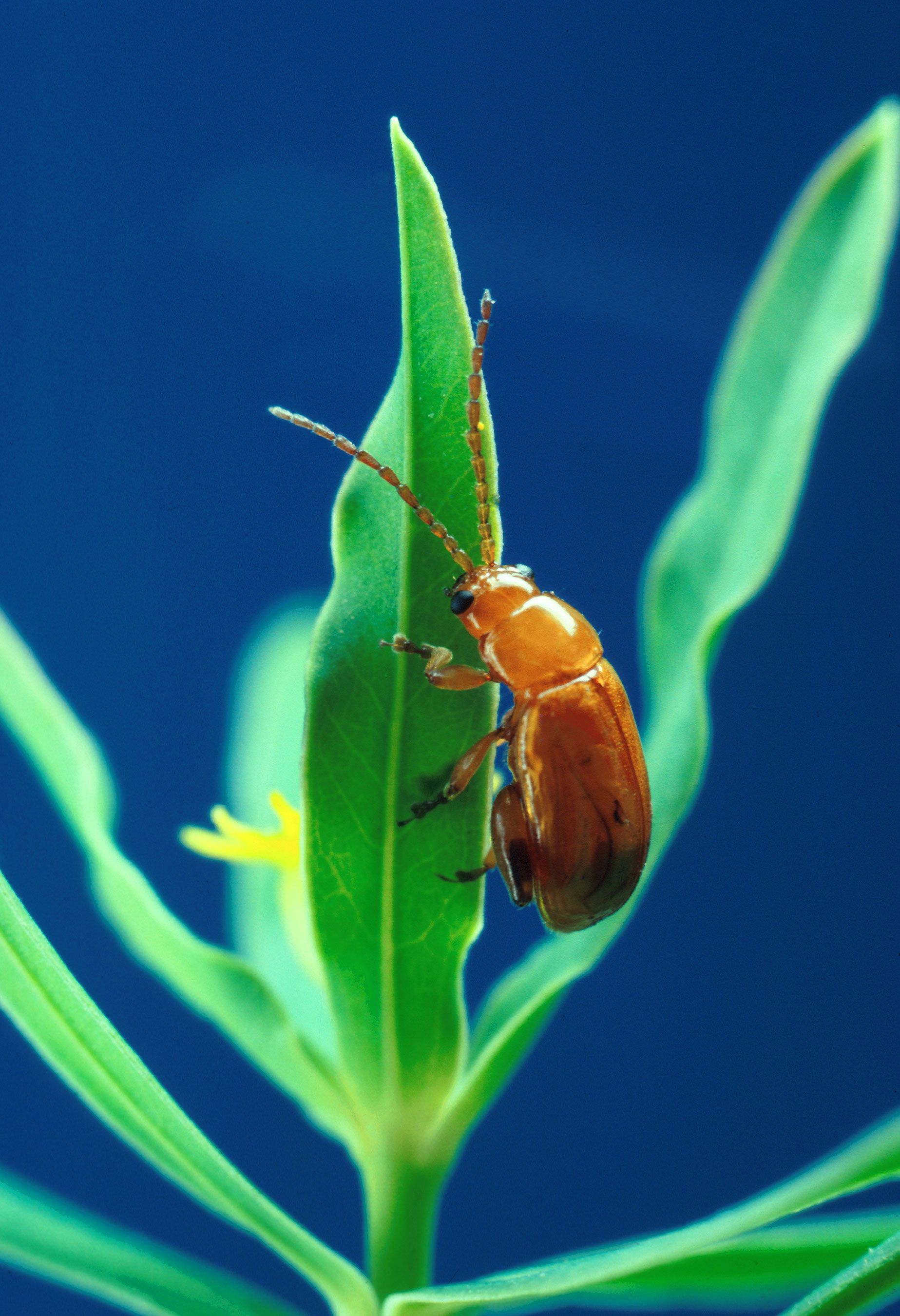

Scientific classification
- Kingdom: Animalia
- Phylum: Arthropoda
- Class: Insecta
- Order: Coleoptera
- Suborder: Polyphaga
- Infraorder: Cucujiformia
- Family: Chrysomelidae
- Genus: Aphthona
- Species: A. flava

Binomial name
- Aphthona flava Guillebeau, 1895

= Aphthona flava =

Species of beetle

Aphthona flava is a beetle of the genus Aphthona. It is native to Eurasia, and has been introduced into North America as a biocontrol agent for leafy spurge. Adults are brown and difficult to distinguish in the field from A. cyparissiae and A. nigriscutis. A. flava is still the dominant beetle at some Manitoba release sites, but it is relatively scarce in North Dakota and Minnesota. Besides Manitoba, it is widespread in Hungary and Italy.

== Ecology ==
=== Larvae ===
The larvae are active from July to early spring of next year. When they are young, they feed on the hairs of the roots. As soon as they grow up they become bigger and start eating bigger roots. The larvae size is tiny, and are of white colour and are worm-like.

=== Pupa ===
Starting from late spring to early summer the pupa stage begins in the soil.

=== Adult ===
From June to through early fall, if the temperature is right, the adults will come out. They look like flea beetles, and behave like ones too. Their size is 3.4 mm for males, and 3.6 mm for females.
