= Aphthona lacertosa =

Scientific classification
- Kingdom: Animalia
- Phylum: Arthropoda
- Class: Insecta
- Order: Coleoptera
- Suborder: Polyphaga
- Infraorder: Cucujiformia
- Family: Chrysomelidae
- Genus: Aphthona
- Species: A. lacertosa

Binomial name
- Aphthona lacertosa (Rosenhauer, 1847)

Species of beetle

Aphthona lacertosa is a root-feeding flea beetle of the genus Aphthona. It is one of 5 Aphthona spp. that has been used in Alberta, Canada to control leafy spurge, an invasive plant that reduces pasture quality and degrades natural habitats.

A. lacertosa is native to Eurasia, but was released into North America first in 1990, then more widely in 1997. A. lacertosa was released specifically to control leafy spurge in wet habitats, where the use of herbicides is restricted and other previous biocontrol efforts had proven ineffective. It has established in Manitoba, Saskatchewan, and Alberta.

Adults of this species are black and indistinguishable from A. czwalinae in the field.

Larvae cause the most damage to the plant by feeding on the roots. In one study, beetle success in controlling leafy spurge was related to the temperature degree days at the control site, with sites with more temperature degree days having more success.
