= Aphthona abdominalis =

Scientific classification
- Kingdom: Animalia
- Phylum: Arthropoda
- Class: Insecta
- Order: Coleoptera
- Suborder: Polyphaga
- Infraorder: Cucujiformia
- Family: Chrysomelidae
- Genus: Aphthona
- Species: A. abdominalis

Binomial name
- Aphthona abdominalis (Duftschmid, 1825)

Species of beetle

Aphthona abdominalis is a species of leaf beetle known as the minute spurge flea beetle. It was used as an agent of biological pest control against the noxious weed leafy spurge (Euphorbia esula), but never established a viable population.

The adult beetle is light orange with a black abdomen and only about 2 millimeters long. The female lays up to 100 eggs on or near leafy spurge, its host plant. The larva emerges and feeds on the roots of the plant, while the adult eats the leaves and flowers of the plant. Both larva and adult inflict damage on the plant by feeding. In its native range this beetle feeds on leafy spurge and other closely related plants. It is not known to attack other types of plants.

This beetle is native to Eurasia. It was first released as a biocontrol agent for leafy spurge in the United States in the early 1990s, but apparently never established. A abdominalis was never introduced to Canada. This beetle is used for biocontrol less often than other Aphthona species.
