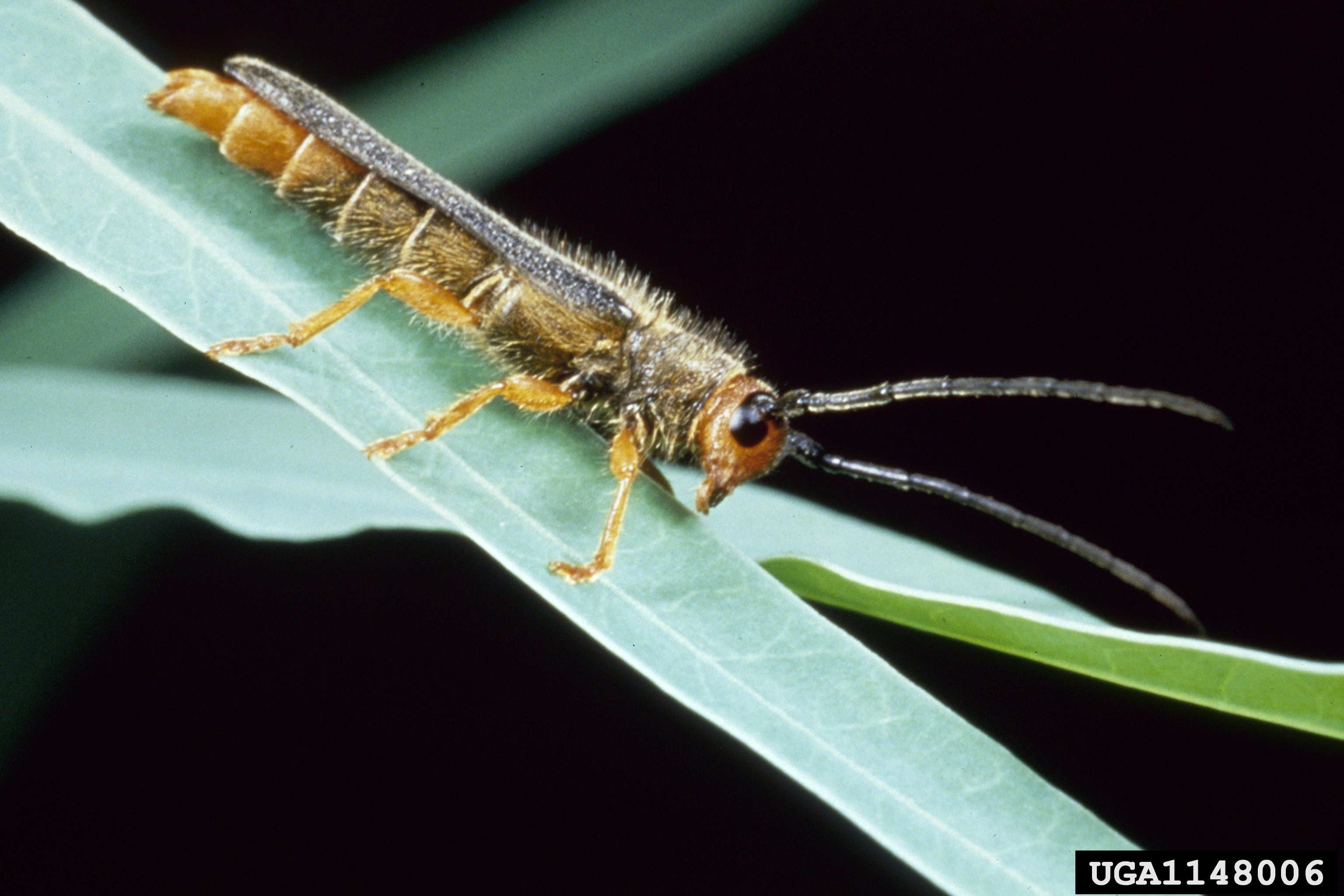

Scientific classification
- Kingdom: Animalia
- Phylum: Arthropoda
- Clade: Pancrustacea
- Class: Insecta
- Order: Coleoptera
- Suborder: Polyphaga
- Infraorder: Cucujiformia
- Family: Cerambycidae
- Genus: Oberea
- Species: O. erythrocephala

Binomial name
- Oberea erythrocephala Shrank, 1776

= Oberea erythrocephala =

Species of beetle

Oberea erythrocephala, the leafy spurge stem boring beetle or red-headed leafy spurge stem borer is a species of longhorn beetle that is a biological control agent for leafy spurge. It is an effective killer of the pest but only works on certain strains of leafy spurge, namely the subgenus Esula of the genus Euphorbia. Because of this, the beetle is considered as secondary in leafy spurge control to five species of Aphthona flea beetle.

== Morphology ==
Leafy spurge stem boring beetle adults are slender, elongate beetles. Their hind wings are grayish-black, and the head is red. The species also has black eyes. Larvae are also slender and elongate but have white and black heads.

== Behavior ==
Leafy spurge stem boring beetles are solitary. They come together to mate between late May and June. Females lay their eggs from late June to mid-July.

The beetles have a singular diet, only eating certain varieties of leafy spurge. Although being well-established in several states, they are not usually found in large numbers. The most reliable indicator of the presence of leafy spurge stem boring beetles is ring-like grooves chewed around leafy spurge stems.

== Pest control ==
Leafy spurge stem boring beetles are mainly used for control of the leafy spurge. They are combined with about 10 other Eurasian insect species, and are used to biologically control leafy spurge.

The approval for the introduction of the beetle species occurred in 1980. Fifteen years later, the leafy spurge stem boring beetle was widely distributed in at least fifteen US states and several Canadian provinces.

Although the beetle is an introduced, non-native species to the US and Canada, it has not been detrimental to the ecosystems there in any way. This is probably due to the limited diet the species has.
