= Healthy Meadows =

American company based in Montana

Healthy Meadows, based in Red Lodge, Montana near Yellowstone National Park, is a company co-owned by Ivan Thrane and Chia Chen-Speidel that organizes natural weed control through conservation grazing, a technique using animals that is more environmentally friendly than spraying pesticides. The Montana Bureau of Land Management is a client.

Thrane and Chen-Speidel's flock number over 250 goats as of July 2013. On a typical day, the herd covers four to seven miles with an average customer's land takes between one and three days to clear.

Companies using goats to control and eradicate leafy spurge, knapweed, and other toxic weeds have sprouted across the American West. Montana's ranching industry spends about $100 million a year to control and rid itself of toxic weeds. Clearing dry brush has also proven to be valuable to reducing fire hazards.
