= Aphthona czwalinae =

Scientific classification
- Kingdom: Animalia
- Phylum: Arthropoda
- Class: Insecta
- Order: Coleoptera
- Suborder: Polyphaga
- Infraorder: Cucujiformia
- Family: Chrysomelidae
- Genus: Aphthona
- Species: A. czwalinae

Binomial name
- Aphthona czwalinae Weise, 1888

Species of beetle

Aphthona czwalinae is a species of leaf beetle known as the black leafy spurge flea beetle. It is used as an agent of biological pest control against the noxious weed leafy spurge (Euphorbia esula).

The adult beetle is shiny black and about 3 millimeters long. The female lays eggs on the soil next to leafy spurge, its host plant, during the summer months. The larva emerges in 16 or 17 days. It is white with a light brown head. It goes to work feeding on the roots of the plant throughout the winter and spring and then pupates in the soil until emerging as an adult in early summer. As the larvae weaken the roots the adults feed on the leaves and flowers of the plant, killing the plant outright or allowing infection by opportunistic fungi.

This beetle is native to eastern Europe and central Asia. It was first released as a biocontrol agent for leafy spurge in the United States in the late 1980s. It was thought to be a major factor is the success of biocontrol efforts for leafy spurge until it was discovered that most of what was thought to be A. czwalinae was in fact A. lacertosa. With this realization A. czwalinae stopped being an important component in Aphthona leafy spurge control. A. czwalinae had not been verified to persist in North Dakota or Minnesota for several years, until Roehrdanz documented it in Eastern Montana in 2006.
