= Mordellochroa humerosa =

Scientific classification
- Domain: Eukaryota
- Kingdom: Animalia
- Phylum: Arthropoda
- Class: Insecta
- Order: Coleoptera
- Suborder: Polyphaga
- Infraorder: Cucujiformia
- Family: Mordellidae
- Genus: Mordellochroa
- Species: M. humerosa

Binomial name
- Mordellochroa humerosa (Rosenhauer, 1847)

Synonyms
- Mordella humerosa Rosenhauer, 1847; Tolida freyi Ermisch, 1944

Species of beetle

Mordellochroa humerosa is a species of beetle in the family Mordellidae. It was described in 1847 by Wilhelm Gottlieb Rosenhauer. It is found in Europe and the Near East.
