= Mordellochroa hasegawai =

Scientific classification
- Kingdom: Animalia
- Phylum: Arthropoda
- Clade: Pancrustacea
- Class: Insecta
- Order: Coleoptera
- Suborder: Polyphaga
- Infraorder: Cucujiformia
- Family: Mordellidae
- Genus: Mordellochroa
- Species: M. hasegawai

Binomial name
- Mordellochroa hasegawai Nomura & Kato, 1959

Species of beetle

Mordellochroa hasegawai is a beetle in the genus Mordellochroa of the family Mordellidae. It was described in 1959 by Nomura & Kato.
