= Penstemon idahoensis =

- Plant with wavy edges on its leaves in Elko County, Nevada

Scientific classification
- Kingdom: Plantae
- Clade: Tracheophytes
- Clade: Angiosperms
- Clade: Eudicots
- Clade: Asterids
- Order: Lamiales
- Family: Plantaginaceae
- Genus: Penstemon
- Species: P. idahoensis

Binomial name
- Penstemon idahoensis N.D.Atwood & S.L.Welsh

Plant species in the veronica family

Penstemon idahoensis, the Idaho penstemon, is a rare, plant of the Veronica family that only grows in a small area where Idaho, Nevada, and Utah meet in the western United States.

== Description ==
The Idaho penstemon is a perennial herbaceous plant that grows several 8 to 20 centimeters (3–8 in) tall flowering stems from an almost woody caudex. The stems are glandular, sticky, and usually covered in sand, growing straight upwards or leaning outwards before growing upwards from the base of the plant.

Plants have both basal leaves and leaves attached to the flowering stems, that are more or less leathery, and like the stems are glandular and usually covered in a dusting of sand. The basal leaves and the lowest of the ones on the stems are narrowly oblanceolate, shaped like a reversed spear head, with smooth edges, except that that plants in Nevada can have noticeably wavy edges. They measure 3.5–7 cm (1.5–3 in) long and are typically just 2–5 millimeters wide, but occasionally can reach as much as 8 mm. The flowering stems have two to eight leaf pairs, the uppermost 3.4–5.5 cm (1.3–2.2 in) long and 2–6 mm wide. They are narrowly elliptic to grass-like in shape, with a tapering to truncated base that attaches directly to the main stem with a blunt to narrow point.

The deep blue to blue-purple flowers all face in one direction away from the stem and are 1.7–2.1 centimeters (0.7–0.8 in) long with a hairless exterior. Like the leaves and stems they are sticky and often covered in sand, and have faint reddish purple floral guide lines. The interior is also hairless and expands gradually without a tightening at the mouth. The stamens are contained within the flower, but the longer pair can reach the flower's mouth. The staminode also does not extend out of the flower and has only a few hairs at the end, 8–10 mm long. Each flowering stem has its groups of flowers tightly packed together, though each will have three to five groups each with two points of attachment on opposite sides of the stem with one to five flowers. It can bloom in June or July in its native habitat.

The fruit is a capsule 7.5–10 mm long by 5–6 mm wide.

== Taxonomy ==
In 1988 a new species in the Penstemon genus was described by Nephi Duane Atwood and Stanley Larson Welsh, naming it Penstemon idahoensis. Like the other species in its genus it is part of the Plantaginaceae family. The species has no synonyms or subspecies. The type specimen of the species was collected in a juniper grove about 1.6 kilometers (1 mi) north of the border between Utah and Idaho on 22 June 1982.

=== Names ===
The species name, idahoensis, is Botanical Latin meaning from Idaho. Similarly, it is known as the Idaho penstemon or Idaho beardtongue.

== Range and habitat ==
Although Idaho penstemon is native to Idaho, Nevada, and Utah, it grows in a very small area where the three states meet. In Idaho it is found in the Goose Creek basin in southwestern Cassia County. Likewise it only grows in the most northeastern part of Elko County, Nevada and northwestern Box Elder County, Utah. There is one known population in Nevada, three to five in Utah, and around 15 in Idaho.

It grows on outcrops of sandy deposits that resemble tufa in the sagebrush shrubland and juniper woodland communities at 1,490 to 1,740 meters (4,890–5,710 ft). The deposits are from lakes that were present prior to the Pleistocene glaciation. They are found on gently sloping sites that most often face south or southwest, but only on fairly solid areas and not when they are too broken or that are turning into sand.

=== Conservation ===
The conservation organization NatureServe evaluated the Idaho penstemon in 2016 and rated it imperiled at the global level (G2) and in both Idaho and Utah (S2), but critically imperiled (S1) in Nevada. It is negatively impacted by leafy spurge (Euphorbia esula) and might be damaged by cattle trampling the plants. Many of its occurrences are on properties on the Bureau of Land Management.

== See also ==
- List of Penstemon species
