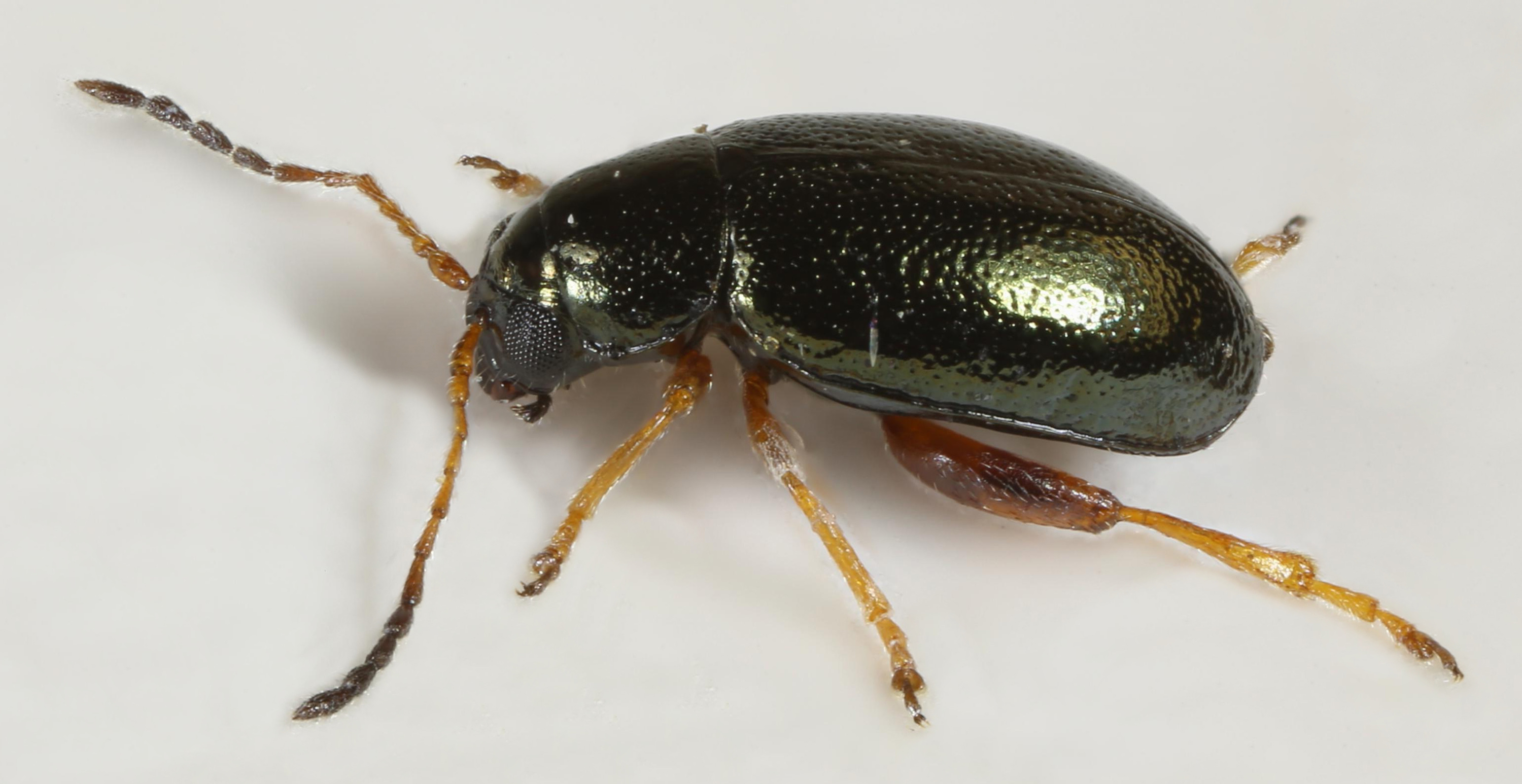

Scientific classification
- Kingdom: Animalia
- Phylum: Arthropoda
- Class: Insecta
- Order: Coleoptera
- Suborder: Polyphaga
- Infraorder: Cucujiformia
- Family: Chrysomelidae
- Genus: Aphthona
- Species: A. herbigrada

Binomial name
- Aphthona herbigrada Curtis, 1837

= Aphthona herbigrada =

Species of beetle

Aphthona herbigrada is a species of leaf beetles from the subfamily Galerucinae. It is found in Western, Southern and the southern part of Central Europe as well as Algeria. Adult beetles and their larvae feed on leaves of Helianthemum nummularium and Cistaceae species.
