= Aphthona cyparissiae =

Scientific classification
- Kingdom: Animalia
- Phylum: Arthropoda
- Clade: Pancrustacea
- Class: Insecta
- Order: Coleoptera
- Suborder: Polyphaga
- Infraorder: Cucujiformia
- Family: Chrysomelidae
- Genus: Aphthona
- Species: A. cyparissiae

Binomial name
- Aphthona cyparissiae (Koch, 1803)

Species of beetle

Aphthona cyparissiae is a species of leaf beetle known as the brown dot leafy spurge flea beetle. It is used as an agent of biological pest control against the noxious weed leafy spurge (Euphorbia esula).

The adult beetle is light golden brown and about 3 millimeters long. The female lays eggs on or near leafy spurge, its host plant, during the summer months. The white larva emerges in about two weeks and feeds on the roots and root hairs. It is active through the fall and winter until the cold stimulates it to pupate. It burrows into the soil to undergo a three-week pupation. Damage to the plant occurs when the larva eats the roots and the adult feeds on the leaves and flowers. Heavy beetle activity kills the plant. This beetle is a spurge specialist, preferring cypress spurge (Euphorbia cyparissias) in its native range and readily attacking leafy spurge as its first alternate.

This beetle is native to Europe. It was first released as a biocontrol agent for leafy spurge in the United States in Fremont County, Wyoming in 1986. It is now established in much of the northern United States from Washington to Rhode Island, though it is now scarce in North Dakota and Minnesota. It is still the dominant Aphthona species at some release sites in Manitoba.

== Notes ==
- Coombs, E. M., et al., Eds. (2004). Biological Control of Invasive Plants in the United States. Corvallis: Oregon State University Press, 237.
