= Aphthona melancholica =

Scientific classification
- Kingdom: Animalia
- Phylum: Arthropoda
- Class: Insecta
- Order: Coleoptera
- Suborder: Polyphaga
- Infraorder: Cucujiformia
- Family: Chrysomelidae
- Genus: Aphthona
- Species: A. melancholica

Binomial name
- Aphthona melancholica Weise, 1888

Species of beetle

Aphthona melancholica is a species of leaf beetles in the subfamily Galerucinae. It is found on the Iberian Peninsula and in England. Adult beetles and their larvae feed on leaves of Euphorbia species (Euphorbiaceae).
