= Mordellochroa tournieri =

Scientific classification
- Kingdom: Animalia
- Phylum: Arthropoda
- Class: Insecta
- Order: Coleoptera
- Suborder: Polyphaga
- Infraorder: Cucujiformia
- Family: Mordellidae
- Subfamily: Mordellinae
- Tribe: Mordellistenini
- Genus: Mordellochroa
- Species: M. tournieri

Binomial name
- Mordellochroa tournieri (Emery, 1876)

Synonyms
- Mordellistena graeca Schilsky, 1895; Mordellistena schusteri Schilsky, 1895; Mordellistena similis Stshegoleva-Barovskaya, 1930; Mordellistena tournieri (Emery, 1876); Mordellochroa schusteri Schilsky, 1895; Tolida tournieri Emery, 1876

Species of beetles

Mordellochroa tournieri is a species of tumbling flower beetle in the family Mordellidae. It is found in Europe.
