= Mordellochroa milleri =

Scientific classification
- Domain: Eukaryota
- Kingdom: Animalia
- Phylum: Arthropoda
- Class: Insecta
- Order: Coleoptera
- Suborder: Polyphaga
- Infraorder: Cucujiformia
- Family: Mordellidae
- Genus: Mordellochroa
- Species: M. milleri

Binomial name
- Mordellochroa milleri (Emery, 1876)

Synonyms
- Mordellistena milleri Emery, 1876

Species of beetle

Mordellochroa milleri is a beetle in the genus Mordellochroa of the family Mordellidae. It was described in 1876 by Carlo Emery.
