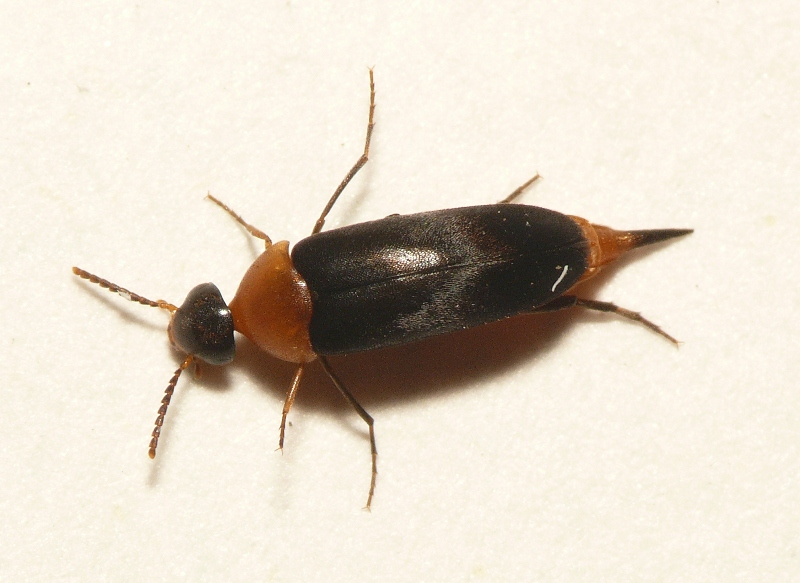
- Mordellochroa abdominalis

Scientific classification
- Domain: Eukaryota
- Kingdom: Animalia
- Phylum: Arthropoda
- Class: Insecta
- Order: Coleoptera
- Suborder: Polyphaga
- Infraorder: Cucujiformia
- Family: Mordellidae
- Subfamily: Mordellinae
- Tribe: Mordellistenini
- Genus: Mordellochroa
- Species: M. abdominalis

Binomial name
- Mordellochroa abdominalis (Fabricius, 1775)

Synonyms
- Mordella abdominalis Fabricius; Mordella bicolor Sulzer, 1776; Mordella nigra Marsham, 1802; Mordella ventralis Fabricius, 1792; Mordellistena abdominalis (Fabricius, 1775); Mordellochroa nigra (Marsham, 1802); Mordellochroa ventralis (Fabricius, 1792)

= Mordellochroa abdominalis =

Species of beetles

Mordellochroa abdominalis is a species of tumbling flower beetle in the family Mordellidae. It is found in Europe.

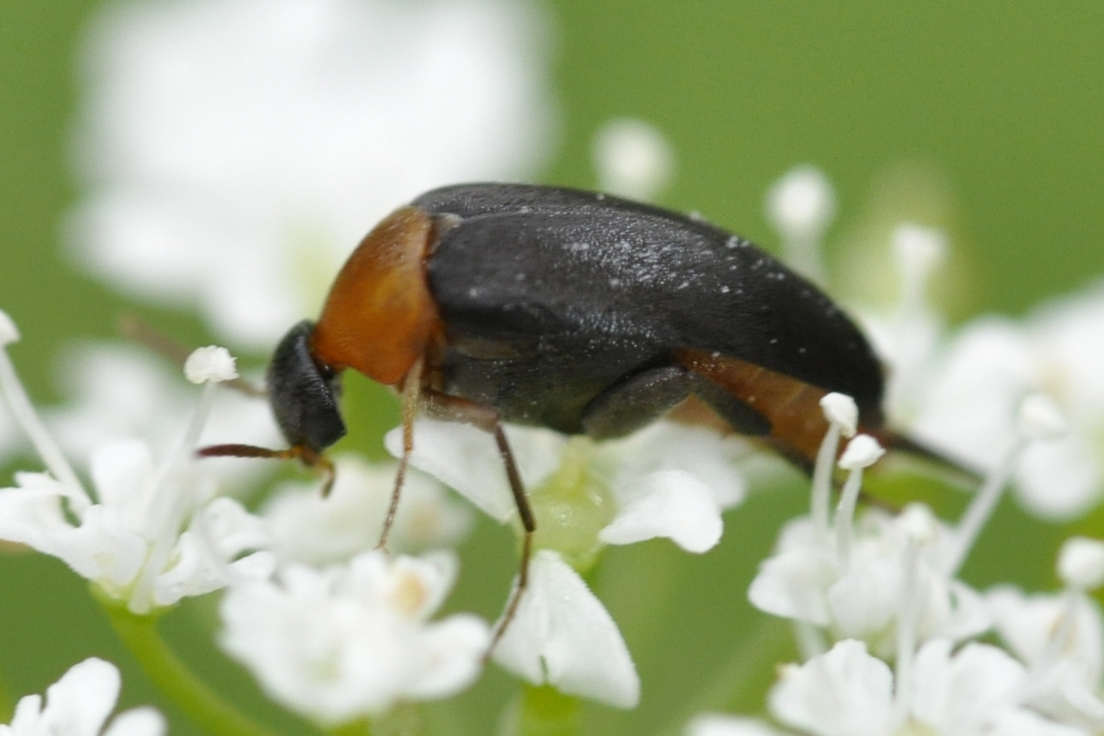
Mordellochroa abdominalis
