= Mordellochroa pulchella =

Scientific classification
- Domain: Eukaryota
- Kingdom: Animalia
- Phylum: Arthropoda
- Class: Insecta
- Order: Coleoptera
- Suborder: Polyphaga
- Infraorder: Cucujiformia
- Family: Mordellidae
- Genus: Mordellochroa
- Species: M. pulchella

Binomial name
- Mordellochroa pulchella (Mulsant & Rey, 1859)

Synonyms
- Mordella pulchella Mulsant & Rey, 1859; Mordellistena bimaculata Ragusa, 1930

Species of beetle

Mordellochroa pulchella is a beetle in the genus Mordellochroa of the family Mordellidae. It was described in 1859 by Étienne Mulsant & Rey.
