= Mordellochroa shibatai =

Scientific classification
- Domain: Eukaryota
- Kingdom: Animalia
- Phylum: Arthropoda
- Class: Insecta
- Order: Coleoptera
- Suborder: Polyphaga
- Infraorder: Cucujiformia
- Family: Mordellidae
- Subfamily: Mordellinae
- Tribe: Mordellistenini
- Genus: Mordellochroa
- Species: M. shibatai

Binomial name
- Mordellochroa shibatai Kiyoyama, 1987

Species of beetle

Mordellochroa shibatai is a species of tumbling flower beetle in the family Mordellidae. It is found in temperate Asia.
