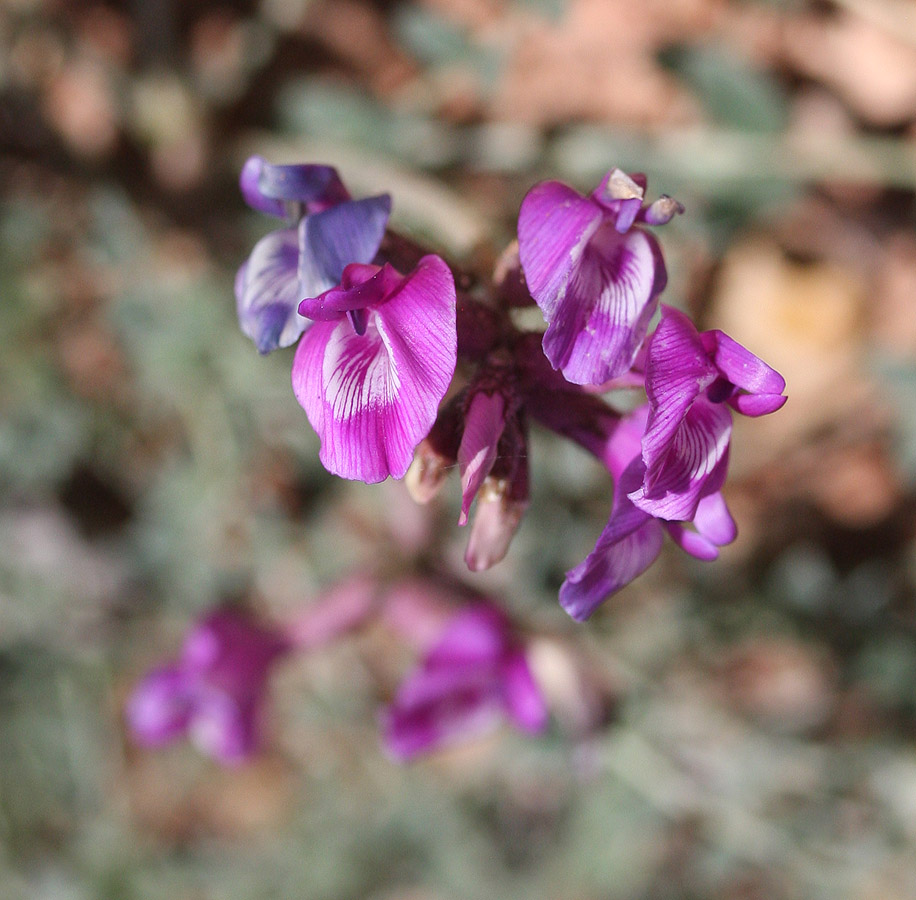
- Zion Milkvetch bloom, Zion Canyon

Conservation status
- Apparently Secure (NatureServe)

Scientific classification
- Kingdom: Plantae
- Clade: Tracheophytes
- Clade: Angiosperms
- Clade: Eudicots
- Clade: Rosids
- Order: Fabales
- Family: Fabaceae
- Subfamily: Faboideae
- Genus: Astragalus
- Species: A. zionis

Binomial name
- Astragalus zionis M.E.Jones

Varieties
- Astragalus zioni var. vigulus S.L.Welsh; Astragalus zionis var. zionis

Synonyms
- Xylophacos zionis (M.E.Jones) Rydb.

= Astragalus zionis =

Species of legume

Astragalus zionis is a species of legume known by the common name Zion milkvetch. It is one of the earliest flowers to bloom in Zion canyon. First described by botanist Marcus E. Jones in 1895, the species has also been placed in the defunct genus Xylophacos under the name Xylophacos zionis. The variety Astragalus zionis var. vigulus, the guard milkvetch, was described by Stanley Welsh in 1993.

== Description ==
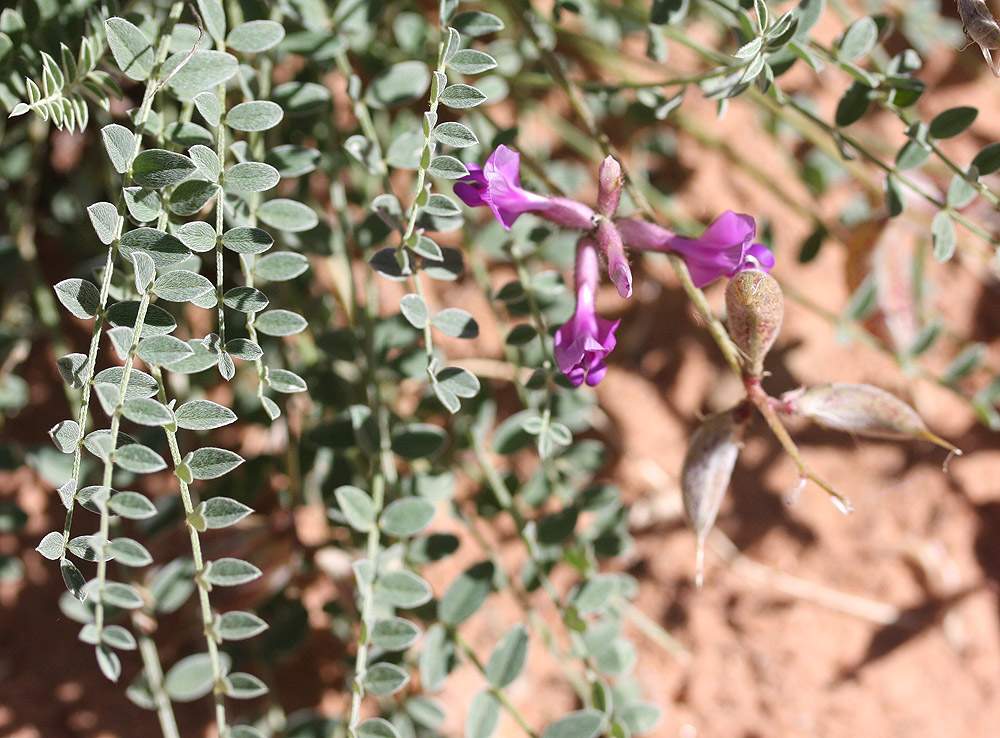
Zion milkvetch bloom

The plant's flowers are purple and its foliage is silvery. The pods are rather hairy, somewhat inflated, ovate, usually mottled, and grow up to one inch long.

== Distribution, habitat, and conservation ==
The range of Astragalus zionis extends from Zion National Park across southern Utah through Glen Canyon to San Juan County, at altitudes of 970 to 2200 meters. It is found on rocky slopes throughout Zion canyon.

Astragalus zionis var. vigulus is considered a Critically Imperiled Plant by the United States Forestry Service and a Critically Imperiled Variety by NatureServe, but is not listed under the Endangered Species Act.
