= Mordellochroa yanoi =

Scientific classification
- Domain: Eukaryota
- Kingdom: Animalia
- Phylum: Arthropoda
- Class: Insecta
- Order: Coleoptera
- Suborder: Polyphaga
- Infraorder: Cucujiformia
- Family: Mordellidae
- Subfamily: Mordellinae
- Tribe: Mordellistenini
- Genus: Mordellochroa
- Species: M. yanoi

Binomial name
- Mordellochroa yanoi (Nomura, 1951)

Species of beetles

Mordellochroa yanoi is a species of tumbling flower beetle in the family Mordellidae. It is found in temperate Asia.
