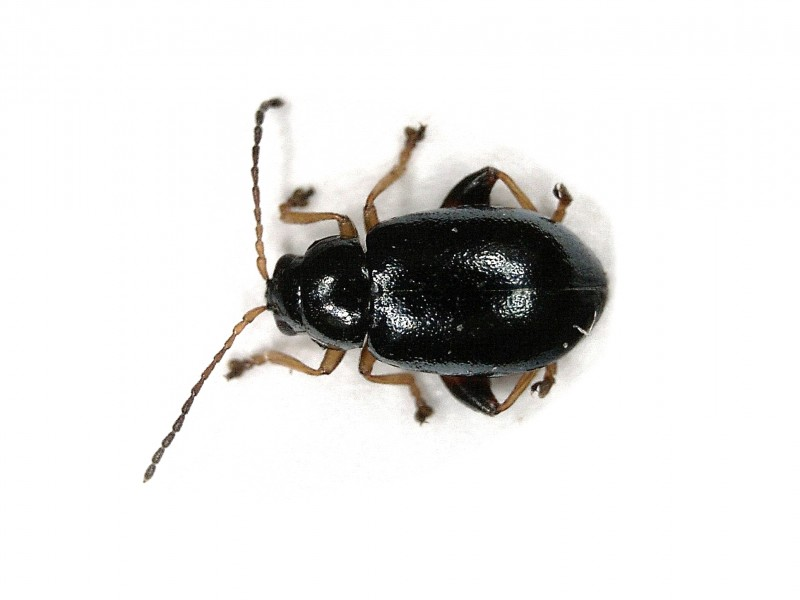

Scientific classification
- Kingdom: Animalia
- Phylum: Arthropoda
- Clade: Pancrustacea
- Class: Insecta
- Order: Coleoptera
- Suborder: Polyphaga
- Infraorder: Cucujiformia
- Family: Chrysomelidae
- Genus: Aphthona
- Species: A. nonstriata

Binomial name
- Aphthona nonstriata (Goeze, 1777)

= Aphthona nonstriata =

Species of beetle

Apthona nonstriata, commonly known as the iris flea beetle, is a species of beetle in the family Chrysomelidae. It is found in Europe.
