= Aphthona nigriscutis =

Scientific classification
- Kingdom: Animalia
- Phylum: Arthropoda
- Class: Insecta
- Order: Coleoptera
- Suborder: Polyphaga
- Infraorder: Cucujiformia
- Family: Chrysomelidae
- Genus: Aphthona
- Species: A. nigriscutis

Binomial name
- Aphthona nigriscutis Foudras, 1860

Species of beetle

Aphthona nigriscutis is a root-feeding flea beetle of the genus Aphthona. It is one of five Aphthona spp. that has been used in Alberta, Canada to control leafy spurge, an invasive plant that reduces pasture quality and degrades natural habitats. It, along with A. lacertosa, is one of only two biocontrol agents thought to be effective against leafy spurge.

Larvae cause the most damage to the plant by feeding on the roots.

== Nontarget impacts ==
A. nigriscutis will feed on the native Euphorbia robusta Engelm, though this is thought to be acceptable as the weevil significantly reduces leafy spurge populations over time.

== Return of diversity following biocontrol ==
A 14-year study documented a slight increase plant species richness in a Montana grassland system after release of A. nigriscutis to control leafy spurge.
