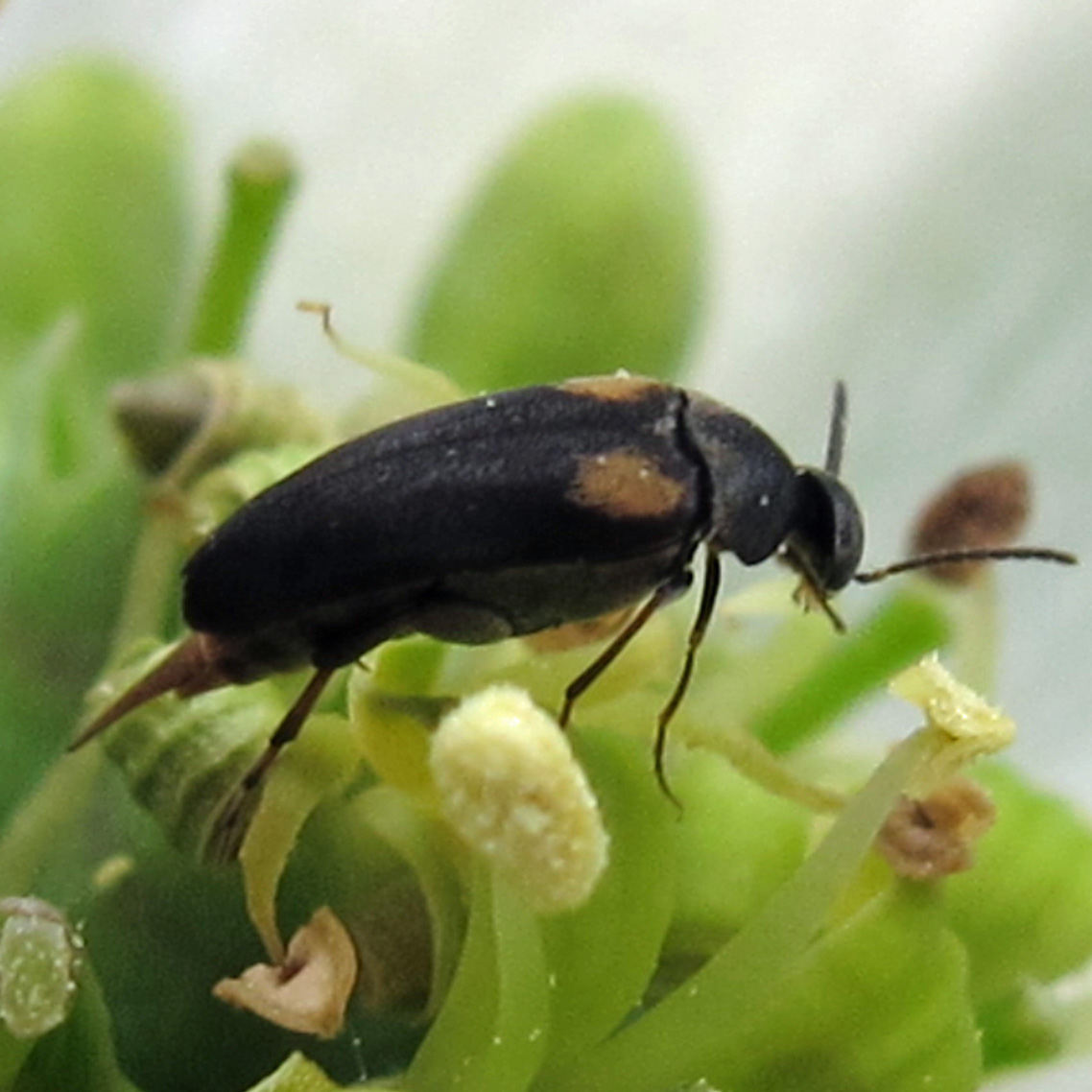

Scientific classification
- Domain: Eukaryota
- Kingdom: Animalia
- Phylum: Arthropoda
- Class: Insecta
- Order: Coleoptera
- Suborder: Polyphaga
- Infraorder: Cucujiformia
- Family: Mordellidae
- Genus: Mordellochroa
- Species: M. scapularis

Binomial name
- Mordellochroa scapularis (Say, 1824)

= Mordellochroa scapularis =

Species of beetle

Mordellochroa scapularis, the gold-shouldered mordellid, is a species of tumbling flower beetle in the family Mordellidae. It is found in North America.
