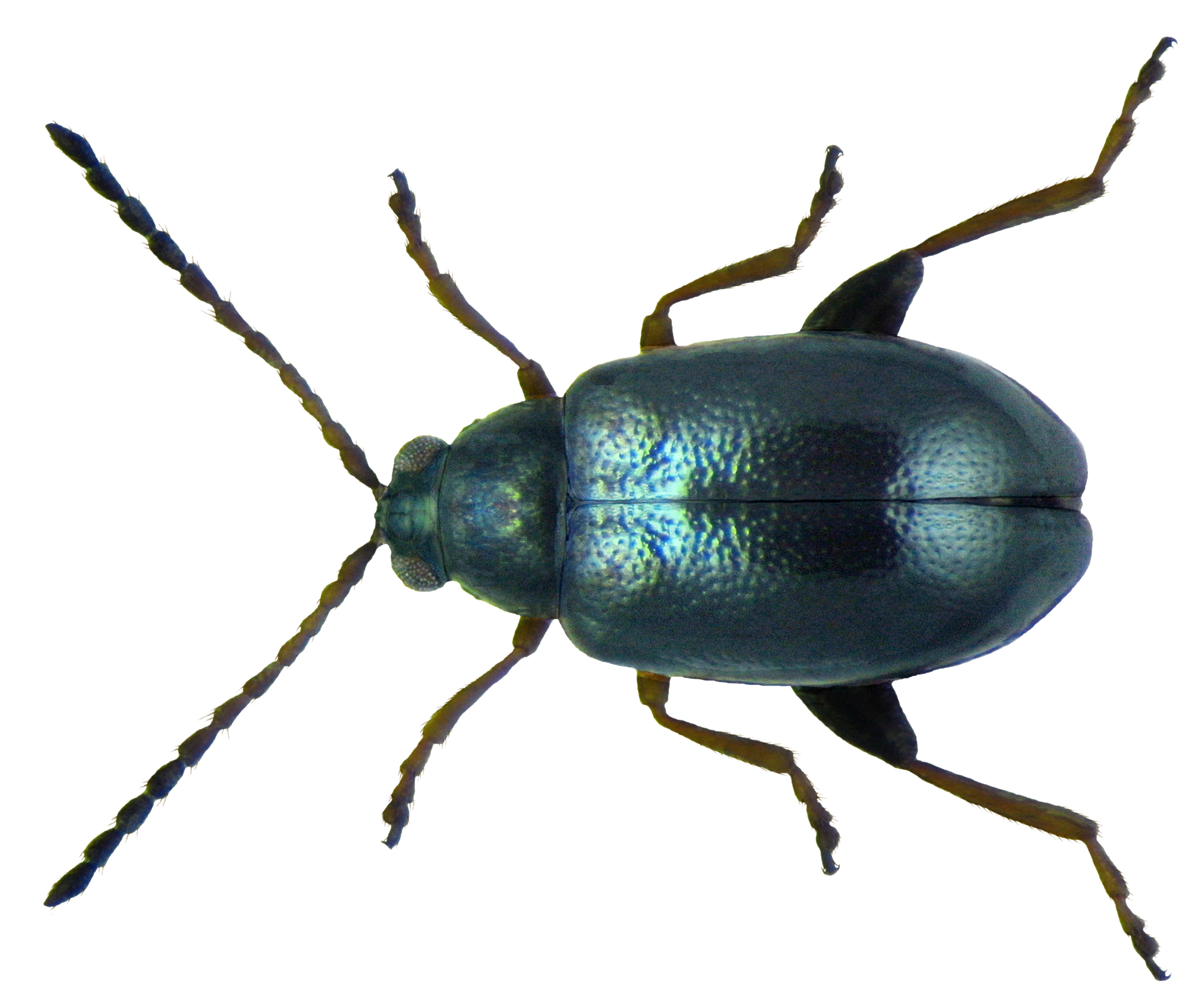
- Aphthona euphorbiae 1.5–2 mm

Scientific classification
- Kingdom: Animalia
- Phylum: Arthropoda
- Class: Insecta
- Order: Coleoptera
- Suborder: Polyphaga
- Infraorder: Cucujiformia
- Family: Chrysomelidae
- Genus: Aphthona
- Species: A. euphorbiae

Binomial name
- Aphthona euphorbiae (Schrank, 1781)

= Aphthona euphorbiae =

Species of beetle

Aphthona euphorbiae is a root-feeding flea beetle. It is widely distributed throughout Europe, North Africa, the Caucasus, Near East, Asia Minor, the southern part of West and Mid Siberia and Kazakhstan. In Latvia it has been reported as a pest of flax Linum.
