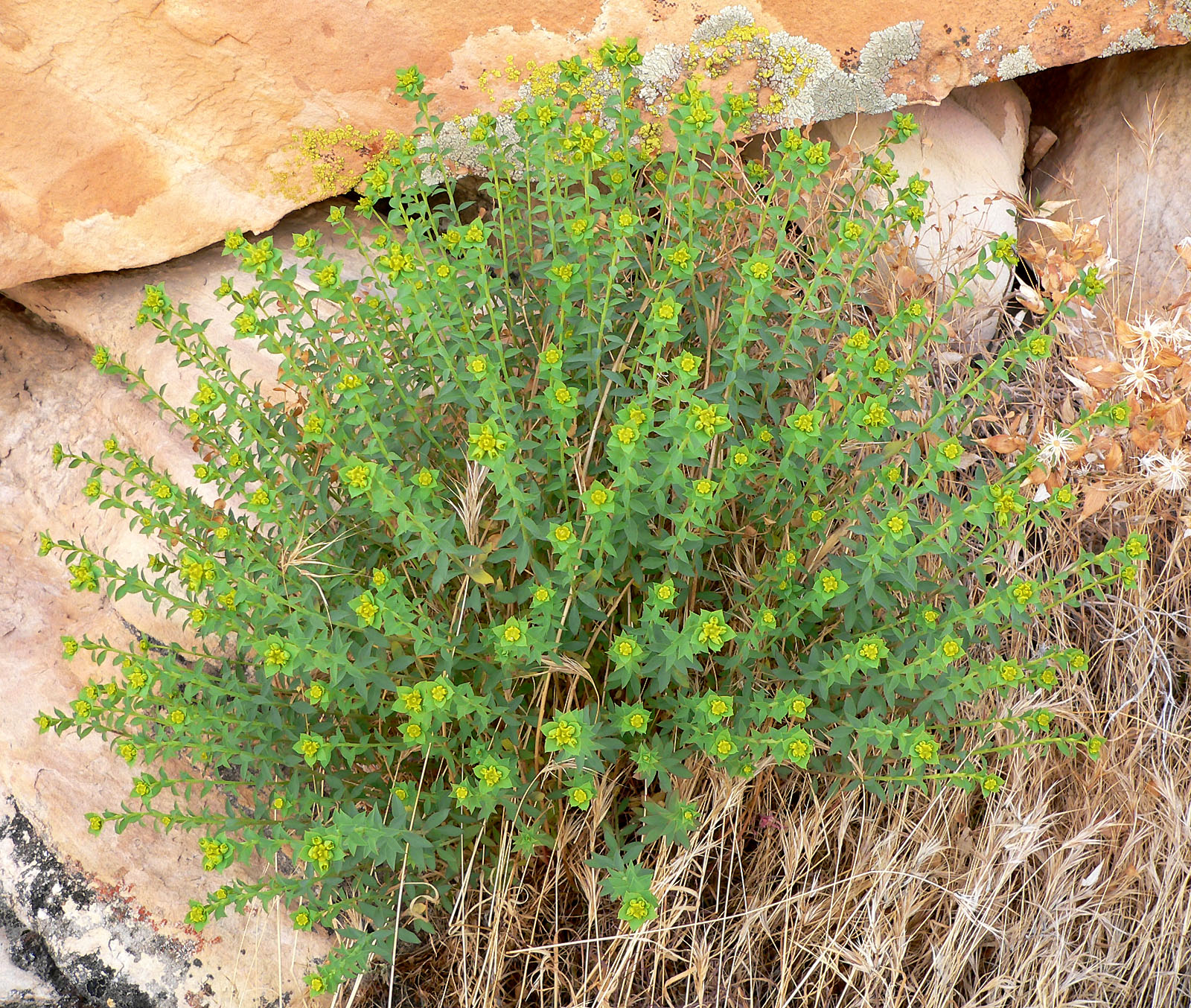

Scientific classification
- Kingdom: Plantae
- Clade: Tracheophytes
- Clade: Angiosperms
- Clade: Eudicots
- Clade: Rosids
- Order: Malpighiales
- Family: Euphorbiaceae
- Genus: Euphorbia
- Species: E. schizoloba

Binomial name
- Euphorbia schizoloba Engelm.

Synonyms
- Euphorbia incisa

= Euphorbia schizoloba =

Species of flowering plant

Euphorbia schizoloba (syn. Euphorbia incisa) is a species of euphorb known by the common name Mojave spurge. It is native to the southwestern United States, where it grows in desert hills and mountains. It is a perennial herb producing upright stems up to 40 centimeters tall, sometimes with coats of sparse hairs. The stems are lined with alternately arranged leaves which are oval with pointed tips and measure up to 2 centimeters in length. The inflorescence is a cyathium with bell-shaped bracts surrounding four tiny glands with flat, fringed appendages. At the center of this arrangement are several staminate flowers and one long pistillate flower.
