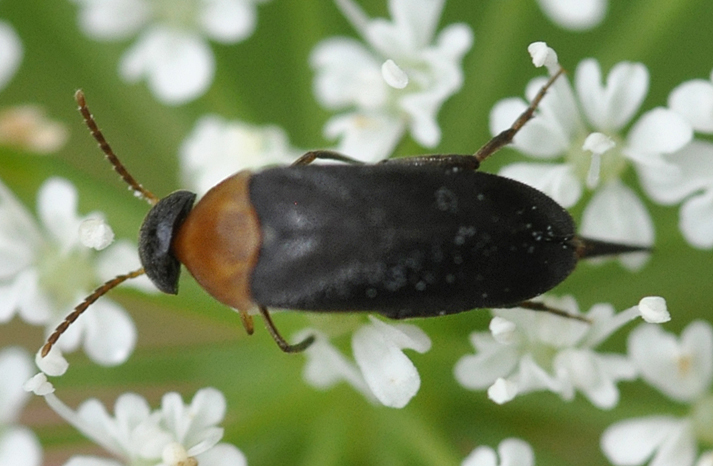
- Mordellochroa abdominalis

Scientific classification
- Domain: Eukaryota
- Kingdom: Animalia
- Phylum: Arthropoda
- Class: Insecta
- Order: Coleoptera
- Suborder: Polyphaga
- Infraorder: Cucujiformia
- Family: Mordellidae
- Subfamily: Mordellinae
- Tribe: Mordellistenini
- Genus: Mordellochroa; Emery, 1876

= Mordellochroa =

Genus of beetles

Mordellochroa is a genus of tumbling flower beetles in the family Mordellidae. There are about eight described species in Mordellochroa.

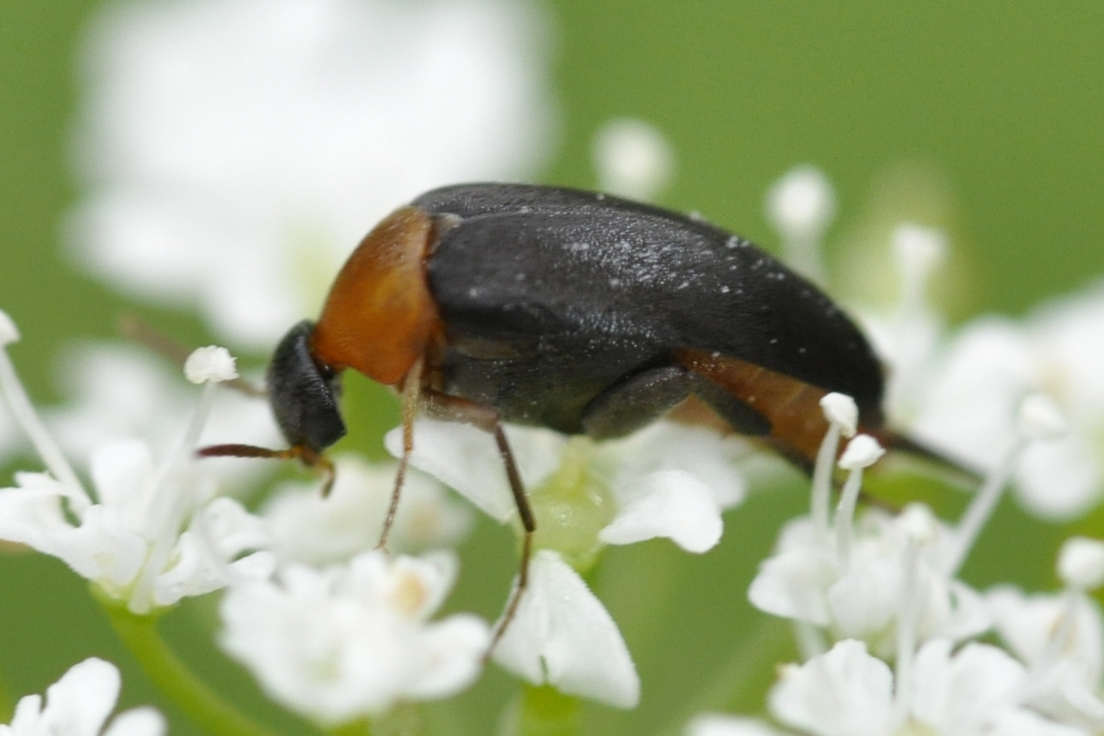
Mordellochroa abdominalis

== Species ==
These eight species belong to the genus Mordellochroa:

- Mordellochroa abdominalis (Fabricius, 1775) (Europe)
- Mordellochroa humerosa (Rosenhauer, 1847) (Europe)
- Mordellochroa milleri (Emery, 1876) (Europe)
- Mordellochroa pulchella (Mulsant & Rey, 1859) (Mediterranean, Australia)
- Mordellochroa scapularis (Say, 1824) (gold-shouldered mordellid) (North America)
- Mordellochroa shibatai Kiyoyama, 1987 (temperate Asia)
- Mordellochroa tournieri (Emery, 1876) (Europe)
- Mordellochroa yanoi (Nomura, 1951) (temperate Asia)
