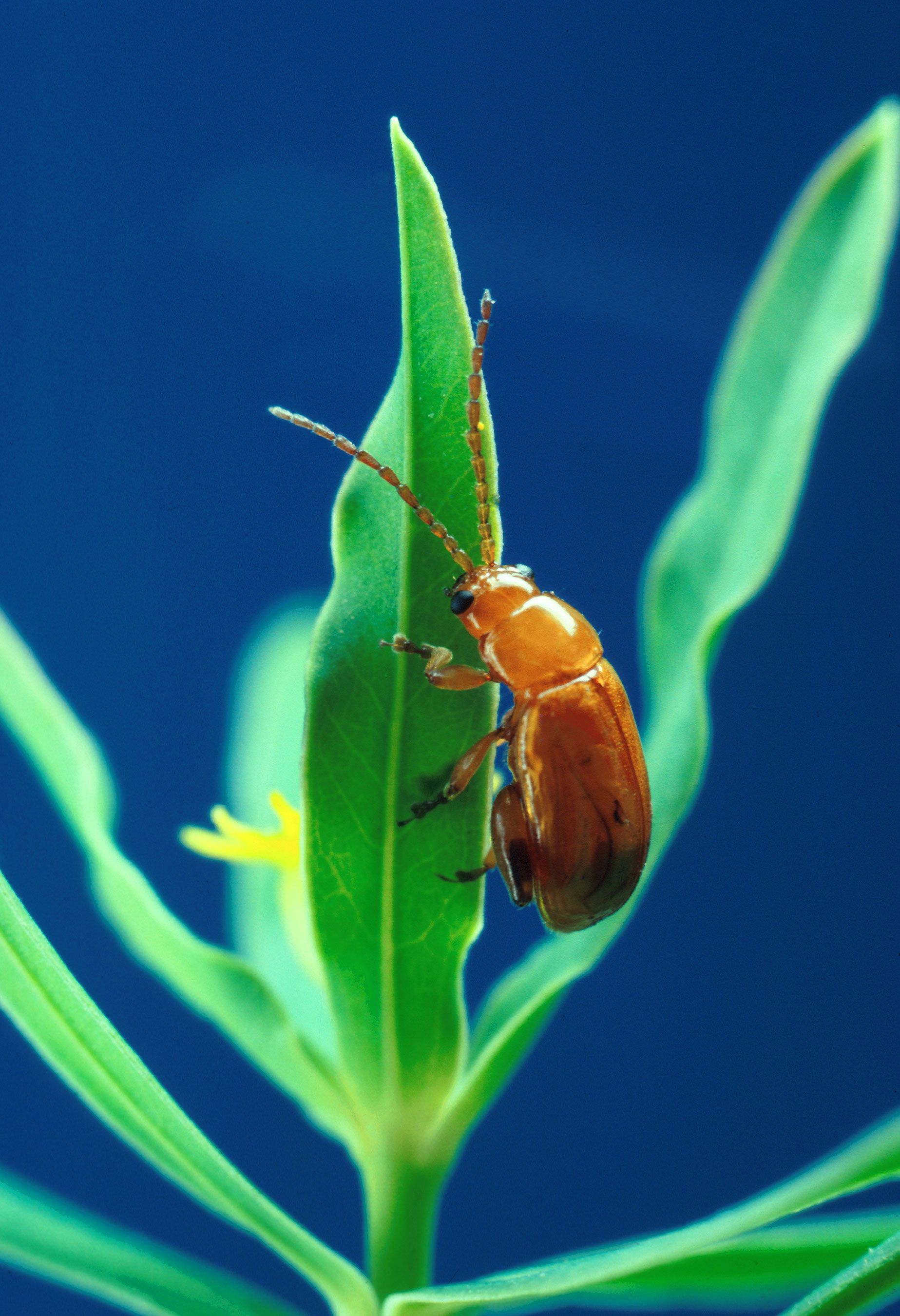
- Flea beetle Aphthona flava

Scientific classification
- Domain: Eukaryota
- Kingdom: Animalia
- Phylum: Arthropoda
- Class: Insecta
- Order: Coleoptera
- Suborder: Polyphaga
- Infraorder: Cucujiformia
- Family: Chrysomelidae
- Tribe: Alticini
- Genus: Aphthona; Chevrolat, 1836

Species
- See text

= Aphthona =

Genus of beetles

Aphthona is a genus of beetle, in the leaf beetle family Chrysomelidae, native to Europe and Asia. More specifically, Aphthona are flea beetles, meaning they have enlarged hind legs for jumping away from potential danger. There are some 300 species known worldwide.

This flea beetle genus is important because of the usefulness of some species in controlling leafy spurge, a major invasive weed in parts of western North America. Several Aphthona species have been taken from Europe and introduced into localized areas of the United States and Canada, and some success against the weed is being seen. The six species used for this purpose include A. abdominalis, A. cyparissiae, A. czwalinae, A. flava, A. nigriscutis, and A. lacertosa, though A. abdominalis apparently never established a viable population and was never introduced in Canada.

== Effectiveness of control ==
Control is generally thought to be effective, but results vary from site to site, which has been attributed to soilborne pathogens, phenology of spring, soil texture, and leafy spurge density. Control is less effective in sandy soils. Control may not be reliably observed and measured for 10 years or more.

== Selected species ==
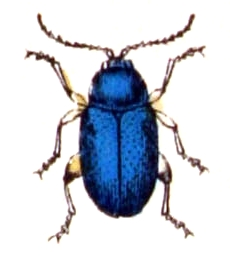
A. nonstriata

- Aphthona abdominalis
- Aphthona aeneomicans
- Aphthona albertinae
- Aphthona alcina
- Aphthona atrocaerulea
- Aphthona atrovirens
- Aphthona beauprei
- Aphthona beckeri
- Aphthona biokovensis
- Aphthona bonvouloiri
- Aphthona carbonaria
- Aphthona chinchihi
- Aphthona coerulea
- Aphthona constantini
- Aphthona crassipes
- Aphthona cyparissiae
- Aphthona czwalinae
- Aphthona delicatula
- Aphthona depressa
- Aphthona erichsoni
- Aphthona espagnoli
- Aphthona euphorbiae
- Aphthona flava
- Aphthona flaviceps
- Aphthona franzi
- Aphthona fuentei
- Aphthona gracilis
- Aphthona herbigrada
- Aphthona illigeri
- Aphthona juliana
- Aphthona konstantinovi
- Aphthona kuntzei
- Aphthona lacertosa
- Aphthona lubischevi
- Aphthona lutescens
- Aphthona maculata
- Aphthona maghrebina
- Aphthona maldesi
- Aphthona melancholica
- Aphthona microcephala
- Aphthona nigriceps
- Aphthona nigriscutis
- Aphthona nonstriata
- Aphthona occitana
- Aphthona ovata
- Aphthona pallida
- Aphthona parnassicola
- Aphthona perrisi
- Aphthona placida
- Aphthona plenifrons
- Aphthona poupillieri
- Aphthona punctiventris
- Aphthona pygmaea
- Aphthona reitteri
- Aphthona rhodiensis
- Aphthona rugipennis
- Aphthona sardea
- Aphthona sarmatica
- Aphthona semicyanea
- Aphthona seriata
- Aphthona sicelidis
- Aphthona signatifrons
- Aphthona stussineri
- Aphthona subovata
- Aphthona syriaca
- Aphthona testaceicornis
- Aphthona velachica
- Aphthona variolosa
- Aphthona vaulogeri
- Aphthona venustula
- Aphthona violacea
- Aphthona wagneri
