= Wilhelm Gottlieb Rosenhauer =

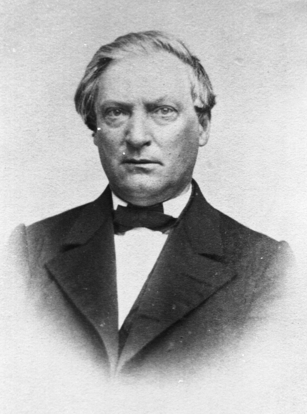

Wilhelm Gottlieb Rosenhauer (11 September 1813 – 13 June 1881) was a German medical doctor and zoologist who specialized in entomology. He was a professor at the University of Erlangen.

Rosenhauer studied medicine and then moved to the natural sciences, particularly zoology and received a doctorate for studies on ground and diving beetles in 1838. In 1843 he became a curator of the zoological and mineralogical collections at the University of Erlangen, becoming a lecturer in 1852 and associate professor in 1858. In 1856 he described the animals collected on a trip to Andalusia in a major work. He collected beetles in the Tyrol and in Hungary and from a descriptive approach he moved to study biology.
