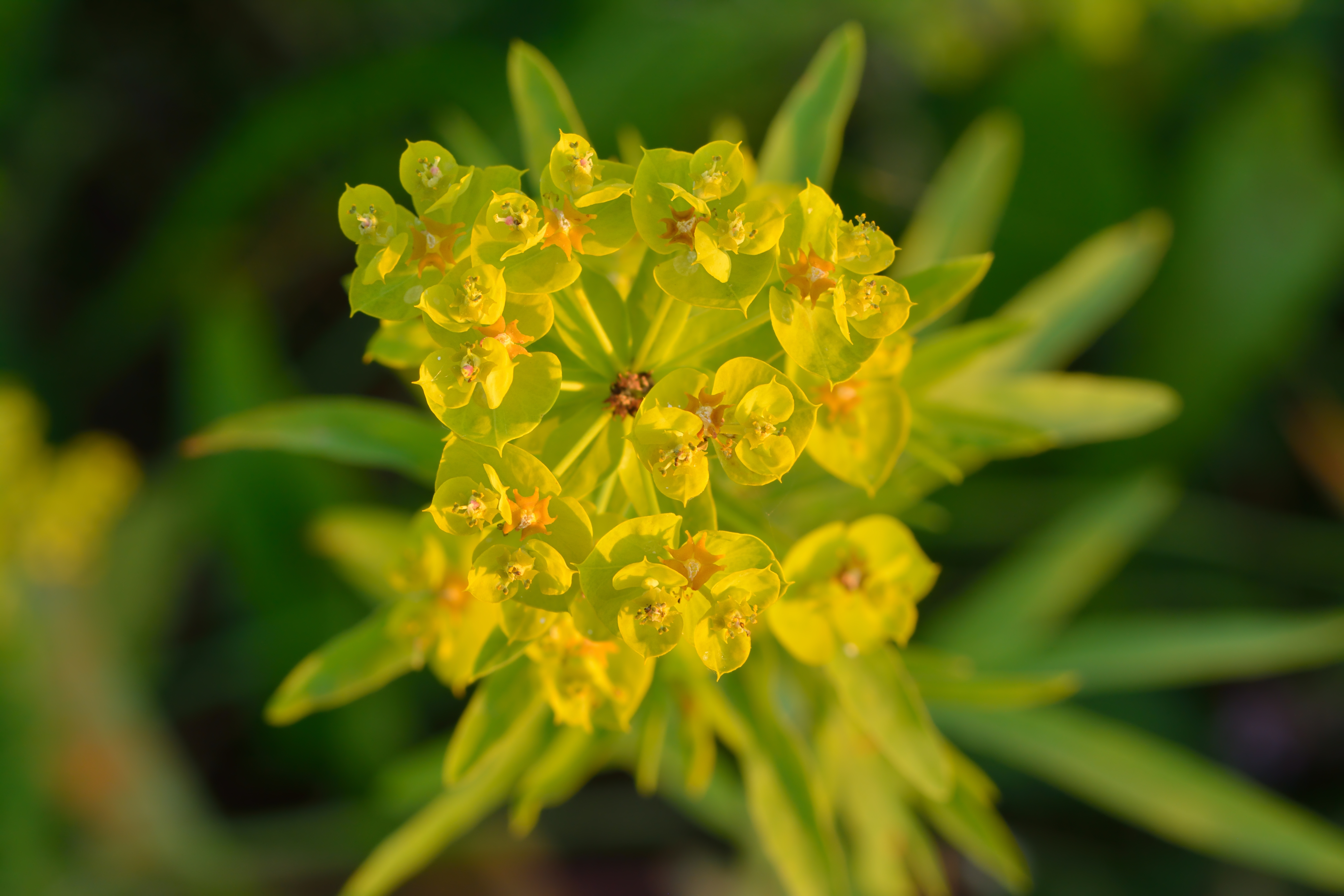

Scientific classification
- Kingdom: Plantae
- Clade: Tracheophytes
- Clade: Angiosperms
- Clade: Eudicots
- Clade: Rosids
- Order: Malpighiales
- Family: Euphorbiaceae
- Genus: Euphorbia
- Species: E. esula

Binomial name
- Euphorbia esula L.

= Euphorbia esula =

Species of plant

Euphorbia esula, commonly known as green spurge or leafy spurge, is a species of spurge native to central and southern Europe (north to England, the Netherlands, and Germany), and eastward through most of Asia north of the Himalaya to Korea and eastern Siberia. It can also be found in some parts of Alaska.

== Description ==
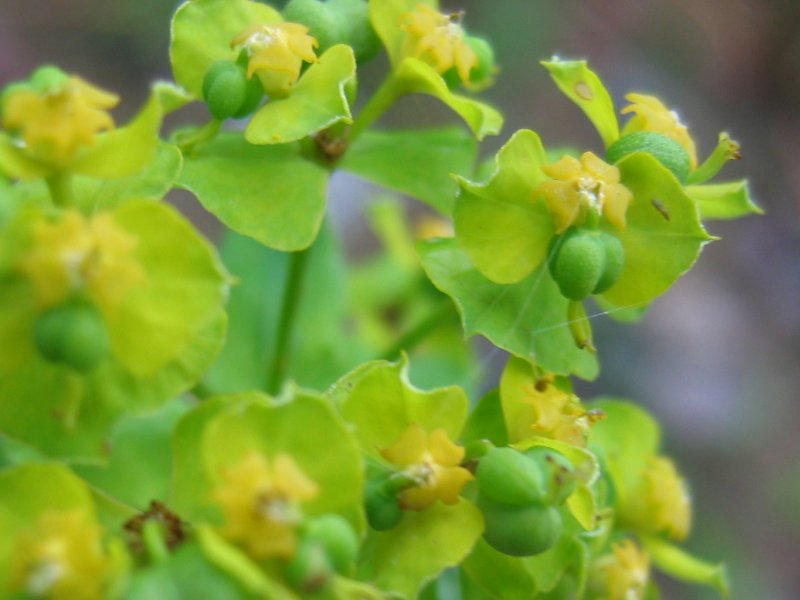
Detail of flowers and immature seeds

It is a herbaceous perennial plant growing to 1-1.2 m tall, with several stems branched from the base. The stems are smooth, hairless, or slightly hairy. The leaves are small, lanceolate, 4-8.5 cm long and up to 1 cm broad, with a slightly wavy margin. The flowers are small, produced in umbels with a basal pair of bright yellow-green petal-like bracts. Clusters of the bracts appear in late spring, while the actual flowers do not develop until early summer. All parts of the plant contain a toxic white milky sap.

It reproduces readily like by seeds that have a high germination rate and may remain viable in the soil for at least eight years. The seed capsules open explosively, dispersing seed up to 5 m from the parent plant, and may be carried further by water and wildlife. Leafy spurge also spreads vegetatively from the root system, which is complex, reported to reach 8 m into the ground and 5 m across, and may have numerous buds.

There are two subspecies and a hybrid subspecies:

- Euphorbia esula subsp. esula. Leaves broadest near apex; umbel bracts 5–15 mm. Throughout the range of the species.
- Euphorbia esula subsp. tommasiniana (Bertol.) Kuzmanov (syn. E. waldsteinii (Sojak) A.R.Smith; E. virgata Waldst. & Kit.). Leaves broadest at the middle; umbel bracts 12–35 mm. Eastern Europe, western Asia.
- Euphorbia esula nothosubsp. pseudovirgata (Schur) Govaerts. Hybrid between the above two subspecies.

== Confusion with Euphorbia virgata ==
It has commonly been confused with Euphorbia virgata. E. esula is no longer considered a permanent component of the North American flora. E. esula is restricted to certain parts of Europe and not considered a weedy species, while E. virgata is found throughout the United States and Canada and has caused significant economic and ecological impacts. E. virgata is best distinguished from E. esula by its leaves, which are 6-15 times longer than wide with margins that are (near-)parallel at the middle of the blade, while E. esula leaves are wider toward the tip, usually 3-8 times longer than wide, with margins that are not parallel at the middle of the leaf. In addition, the apex of E. virgata is usually acute and the base is truncate to attenuate, while the apex of E. esula is rounded or subacute and the base is more gradually attenuate or cuneate. Mentions of E. esula in the North American flora and invasive species literature are now referred to E. virgata.
