= Leafy spurge =

Leafy spurge may refer to several species of plant in the genus Euphorbia, including:

- Euphorbia esula, native to central and southern Europe
- Euphorbia virgata, native to Europe and Asia
