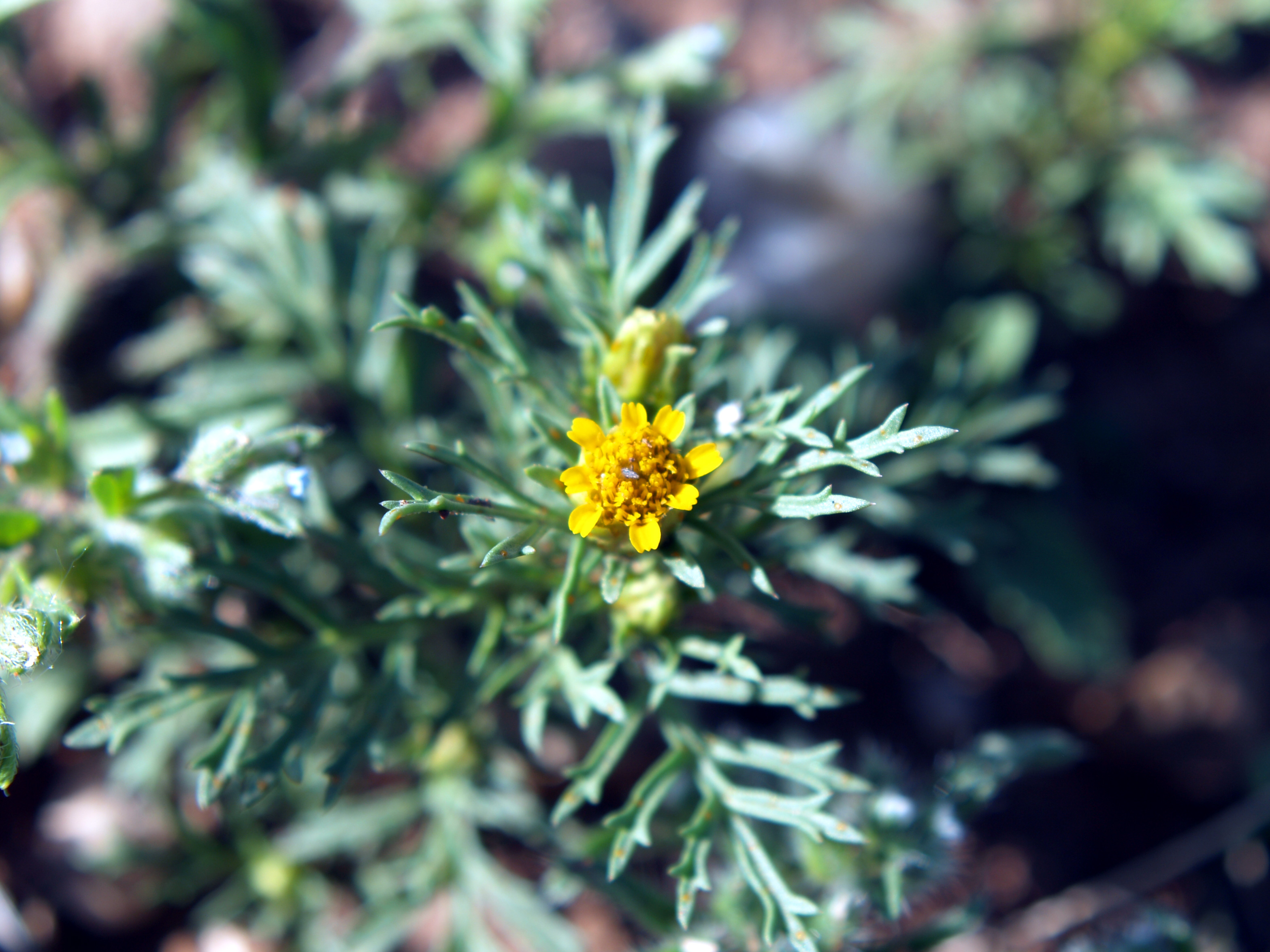
- Dyssodia papposa

Scientific classification
- Kingdom: Plantae
- Clade: Tracheophytes
- Clade: Angiosperms
- Clade: Eudicots
- Clade: Asterids
- Order: Asterales
- Family: Asteraceae
- Subfamily: Asteroideae
- Tribe: Tageteae
- Subtribe: Pectidinae
- Genus: Dyssodia; Cav.

Species
- See text

Synonyms
- Boebera Willd.; Rosilla Less.; Syncephalantha Bartl.

= Dyssodia =

Genus of flowering plants

Dyssodia is a small genus of flowering plants in the family Asteraceae. Many species formerly included in Dyssodia are now treated as members of other related genera, including Thymophylla or Adenophyllum. Dyssodia papposa is usually retained in this genus. The name is derived from the Greek δυσοδια (dusodia), meaning "ill-smelling".

Several species of Dyssodia (sensu lato) have found their way into the nursery trade and are relatively popular flowering annuals for hot, dry sites. Generally sold as threadleaf dyssodia (Dyssodia tenuisecta) and golden dyssodia (Dyssodia cf. pentachaeta). They perform best in well-drained soil.

== Phytochemistry ==
Two species of the genus, D. acerosa and D. pentachaeta have been studied for their essential oil content.

== Species ==
Six species are accepted.

- Dyssodia decipiens (Bartl.) M.C.Johnst.
- Dyssodia friasensis Domke
- Dyssodia papposa (Vent.) Hitchc. — fetid marigold
- Dyssodia pinnata (Cav.) B.L.Rob.
- Dyssodia remota S.F.Blake
- Dyssodia tagetiflora Lag.

== Formerly placed here ==
- Adenophyllum porophyllum (Cav.) Hemsl. (as D. porophyllum (Cav.) Cav.
- Adenophyllum wrightii A.Gray (as D. neomexicana (A.Gray) B.L.Rob.)
- Comaclinium montanum (Benth.) Strother (as D. montana (Benth.) A.Gray)
- Thymophylla acerosa (DC.) Strother (as D. acerosa DC.)
- Thymophylla aurantiaca (Brandegee) Rydb. (as D. aurantiaca (Brandegee) B.L.Rob.)
- Thymophylla pentachaeta (DC.) Small (as D. pentachaeta (DC.) B.L.Rob.)
- Thymophylla setifolia var. greggii (A.Gray) Strother (as D. setifolia var. greggii (A.Gray) M.C.Johnst., D. greggii B.L.Rob., and D. setifolia var. radiata (A.Gray) Strother)
- Thymophylla tenuiloba (DC.) Small (as D. tenuiloba (DC.) B.L.Rob.)
- Thymophylla tephroleuca (S.F.Blake) Strother (as D. tephroleuca S.F.Blake)
