= Dogweed =

Dogweed is a common name for several plants formerly included in the genus Dyssodia. Plants referred to as dogweed include species in the genera:

- Adenophyllum
- Bobea, especially:
  - Bobea sandwicensis. endemic to Hawaii
- Thymophylla, especially:
  - Thymophylla pentachaeta, native to the southwestern United States and Mexico
