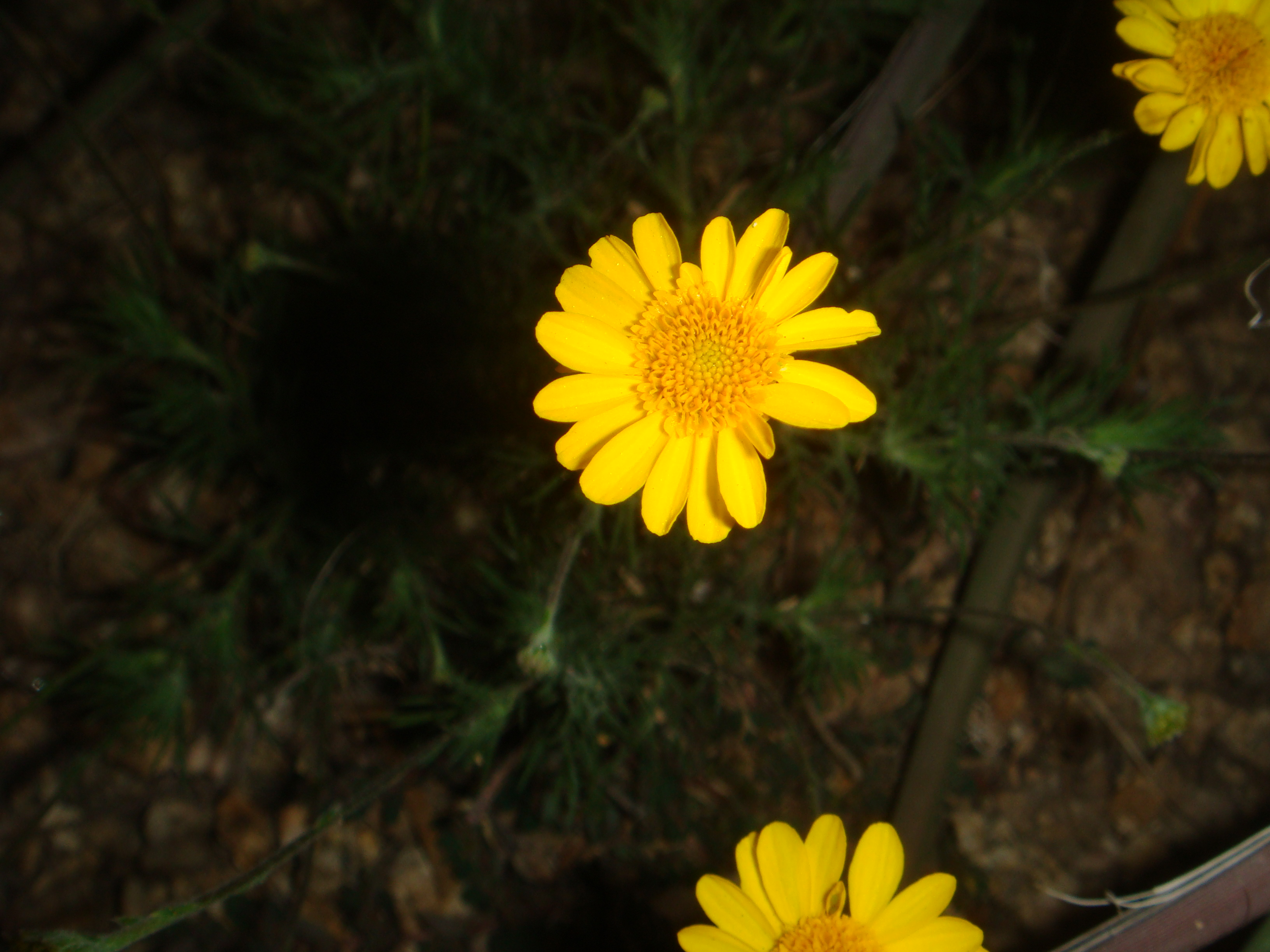

Scientific classification
- Kingdom: Plantae
- Clade: Tracheophytes
- Clade: Angiosperms
- Clade: Eudicots
- Clade: Asterids
- Order: Asterales
- Family: Asteraceae
- Genus: Thymophylla
- Species: T. tenuiloba

Binomial name
- Thymophylla tenuiloba (DC.) Small

Synonyms
- Dyssodia tenuiloba (DC.) B.L.Rob. Hymenatherum tenuilobum DC.

= Thymophylla tenuiloba =

Species of plant

Thymophylla tenuiloba, also known as the bristleleaf pricklyleaf, Dahlberg daisy, small bristleleaf pricklyleaf, golden fleece, or shooting star, is a bushy, multi-branched flowering annual from the family Asteraceae. Native to south central Texas and northern Mexico, it produces a large number of small, yellow flowers and demonstrates a trailing habit. It is tolerant of heat and dry conditions and is sometimes sold as a summertime annual plant in areas beyond its native range.

The plant was once known as Hymenatherum tenuilobum in the De Candolle system.

The species is naturalized in Queensland in Australia.
