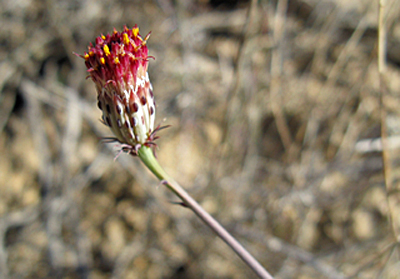

Scientific classification
- Kingdom: Plantae
- Clade: Tracheophytes
- Clade: Angiosperms
- Clade: Eudicots
- Clade: Asterids
- Order: Asterales
- Family: Asteraceae
- Genus: Adenophyllum
- Species: A. porophylloides

Binomial name
- Adenophyllum porophylloides (A.Gray) Strother

Synonyms
- Clomenocoma porophylloides (A.Gray) Rydb.; Dyssodia porophylloides A.Gray; Lebetina porophylloides (A.Gray) A.Nelson

= Adenophyllum porophylloides =

Species of flowering plant

Adenophyllum porophylloides is a species of flowering plant in the family Asteraceae known by the common names San Felipe dogweed and San Felipe dyssodia. It is native to the Sonoran and Mojave Deserts of the southwestern United States (Arizona, California, Nevada) and northwestern Mexico (Sonora, Baja California, Baja California Sur). It grows in alluvial fans, rocky slopes, open scrub and woodlands.

Adenophyllum porophylloides is an aromatic desert subshrub with several branching stems reaching a maximum height near 60 centimeters. The sparse, clawlike leaves are divided into sharply pointed linear lobes that bear prominent resin glands. The foliage has an unpleasant scent. The inflorescence is borne on a peduncle several centimeters long. The flower head is cylindrical and lined with phyllaries with large resin glands on them. The tip of the head blooms with bright yellow to reddish orange disc florets. There are sometimes short, stubby yellow to reddish ray florets along the rim. The fruit is an achene about 5 millimeters long with a bristly, scaly pappus.
