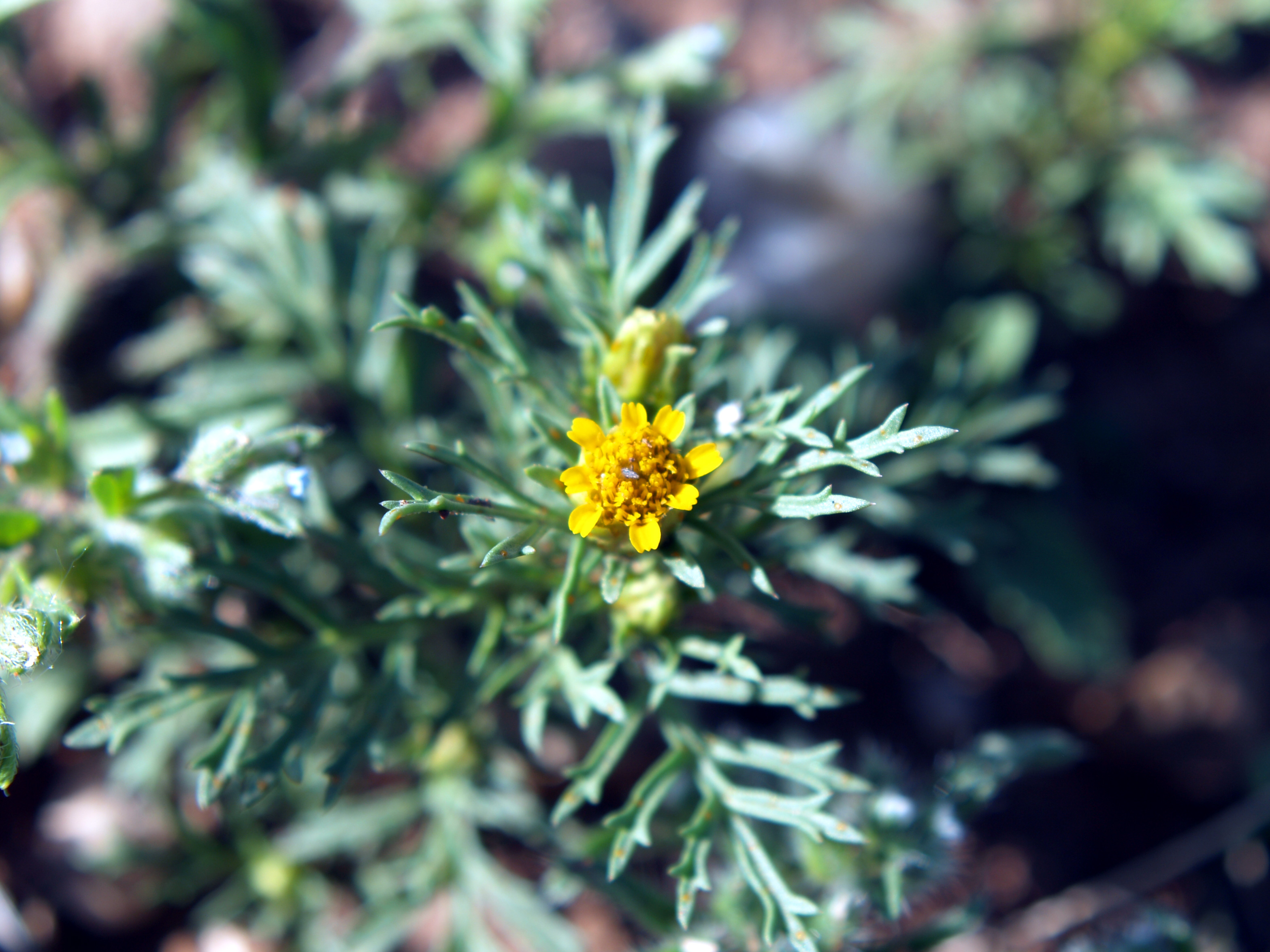

Conservation status
- Secure (NatureServe)

Scientific classification
- Kingdom: Plantae
- Clade: Tracheophytes
- Clade: Angiosperms
- Clade: Eudicots
- Clade: Asterids
- Order: Asterales
- Family: Asteraceae
- Genus: Dyssodia
- Species: D. papposa

Binomial name
- Dyssodia papposa (Vent.) Hitchc.

Synonyms
- Boebera papposa (Vent.) Rydb. ex Britton; Tagetes papposa Vent.

= Dyssodia papposa =

Species of flowering plant in Asteraceae

Dyssodia papposa is a species of annual herbaceous forb in the genus Dyssodia, commonly known as fetid marigold or prairie dogweed. It is native to North America and parts of the Southwest, extending into the Northeast. Native Americans have used the plant to treat multiple medical conditions.

== Description ==
Fetid marigold is an erect, multi-branching annual with a large taproot, common to anthropogenically disturbed areas such as roadsides, fields, and meadows, at elevations from 3000–6500 ft (914–1981 m). Its height is 4–16 inches (5–70 cm). The leaves are simple and opposite, 3/4 in to 2 in (15–50 mm) long and linearly lobate.

The flowers have the disk and ray structure characteristic of the Asteraceae family; both are yellow-orange, up to 1/2in long, with 5–8 ray flowers which are up to 3.5cm long and 1.5 cm wide, with tubular disk flowers and greenish outer and inner bracts. Seeds are small, hairy, narrowly conical with a tuft of bristles at the top, and dark brown when mature. Distinctive orange odor glands dot the stalk, leaves and stems of the plant, which are the source of its characteristic scent. It flowers from summer to fall. The name dyssodia is from the Greek δυσοδια (dusodia), meaning "bad odor," while papposa is from the Latin meaning "with pappus."

Its native range includes the central plains of North America and parts of the Southwest, extending into the Northeast. It has recently been documented in Canada, where it is expected to expand its range via adventitious growth.

== Ecology ==
The plant is host to the dainty sulphur butterfly. It is commonly found in prairie dog towns and is among their preferred food sources.

== Ethnobotany ==
Fetid marigold was given to horses for coughs by the Dakota, used as a febrifuge and smoked for epilepsy by the Keres, applied to red ant bites by the Navajo, and was used by the Lakota as a treatment for headaches, internal bleeding and breathing difficulties. The Omaha reportedly used it to induce nosebleeds to cure headaches. Seeds were ground into flour for bread or roasted without grinding and combined with other foods by the Apache, who also ate the tops of the plant as greens. It's also used by the Luos of Kenya to treat stomach aches.
