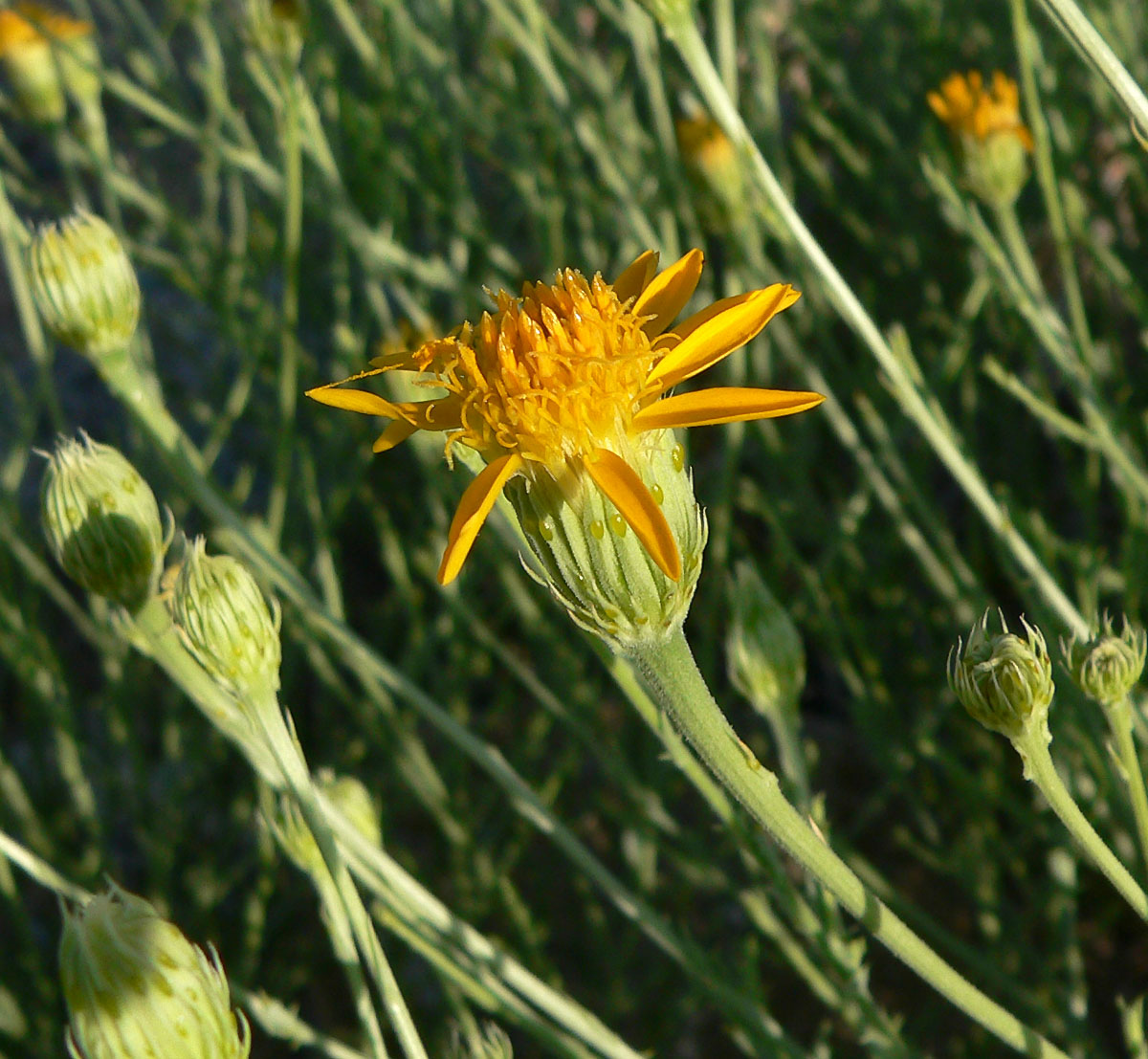

Scientific classification
- Kingdom: Plantae
- Clade: Tracheophytes
- Clade: Angiosperms
- Clade: Eudicots
- Clade: Asterids
- Order: Asterales
- Family: Asteraceae
- Genus: Adenophyllum
- Species: A. cooperi

Binomial name
- Adenophyllum cooperi (A.Gray) Strother

Synonyms
- Clomenocoma cooperi (A.Gray) Rydb.; Clomenocoma laciniata Rydb.; Dyssodia cooperi A.Gray; Lebetina cooperi (A.Gray) A.Nelson; Verbesina lavenia L.

= Adenophyllum cooperi =

Species of flowering plant

Adenophyllum cooperi (Cooper's dyssodia, Cooper's glandweed), is a species of flowering plant in the family Asteraceae. It is native to the Mojave Desert in the southwestern United States, in the States of California, Arizona, Nevada, and Utah.

== Description ==
Adenophyllum cooperi grows to 35–60 cm tall. The leaves are 6–20 cm long, obovate, with a lobed or coarsely toothed margin. The flowers are yellow to orange-red.
