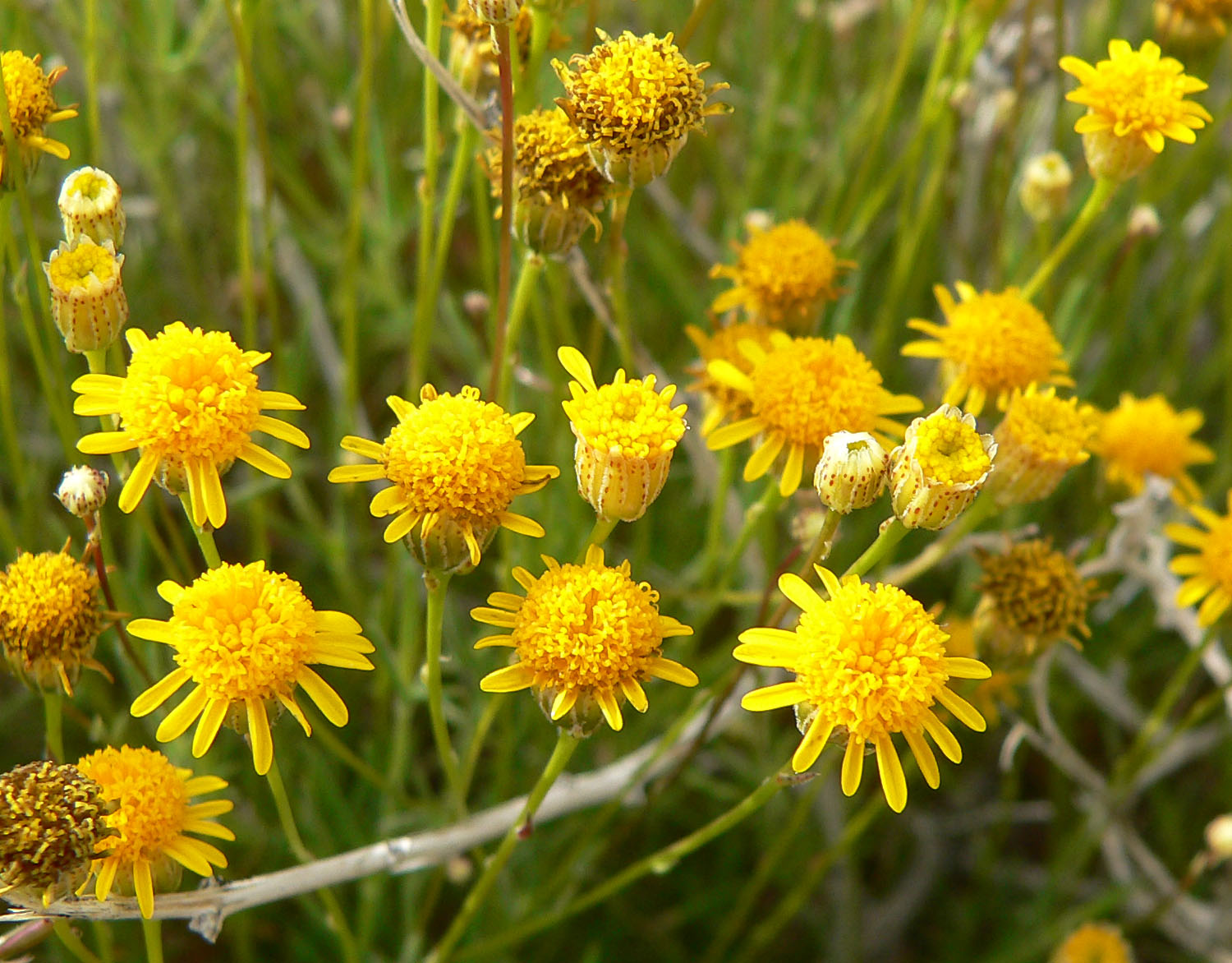
- Thymophylla pentachaeta var. belenidium

Scientific classification
- Kingdom: Plantae
- Clade: Tracheophytes
- Clade: Angiosperms
- Clade: Eudicots
- Clade: Asterids
- Order: Asterales
- Family: Asteraceae
- Subfamily: Asteroideae
- Tribe: Tageteae
- Subtribe: Pectidinae
- Genus: Thymophylla; Lag.

Synonyms
- Gnaphalopsis DC.; Hymenatherum sect. Heterochromea A.Gray; Dyssodia sect. Aurantiacae Strother; Hymenatherum sect. Aciphyllaea (Willd.) A.Gray; Lowellia A.Gray; Dyssodia sect. Hymenatherum (Cass.) Strother; Aciphyllaea (DC.) A.Gray; Hymenatherum sect. Gnaphalopsis (DC.) A.Gray; Dyssodia sect. Gnaphalopsis (DC.) Strother; Dyssodia sect. Aciphyllaea DC.

= Thymophylla =

Genus of plants

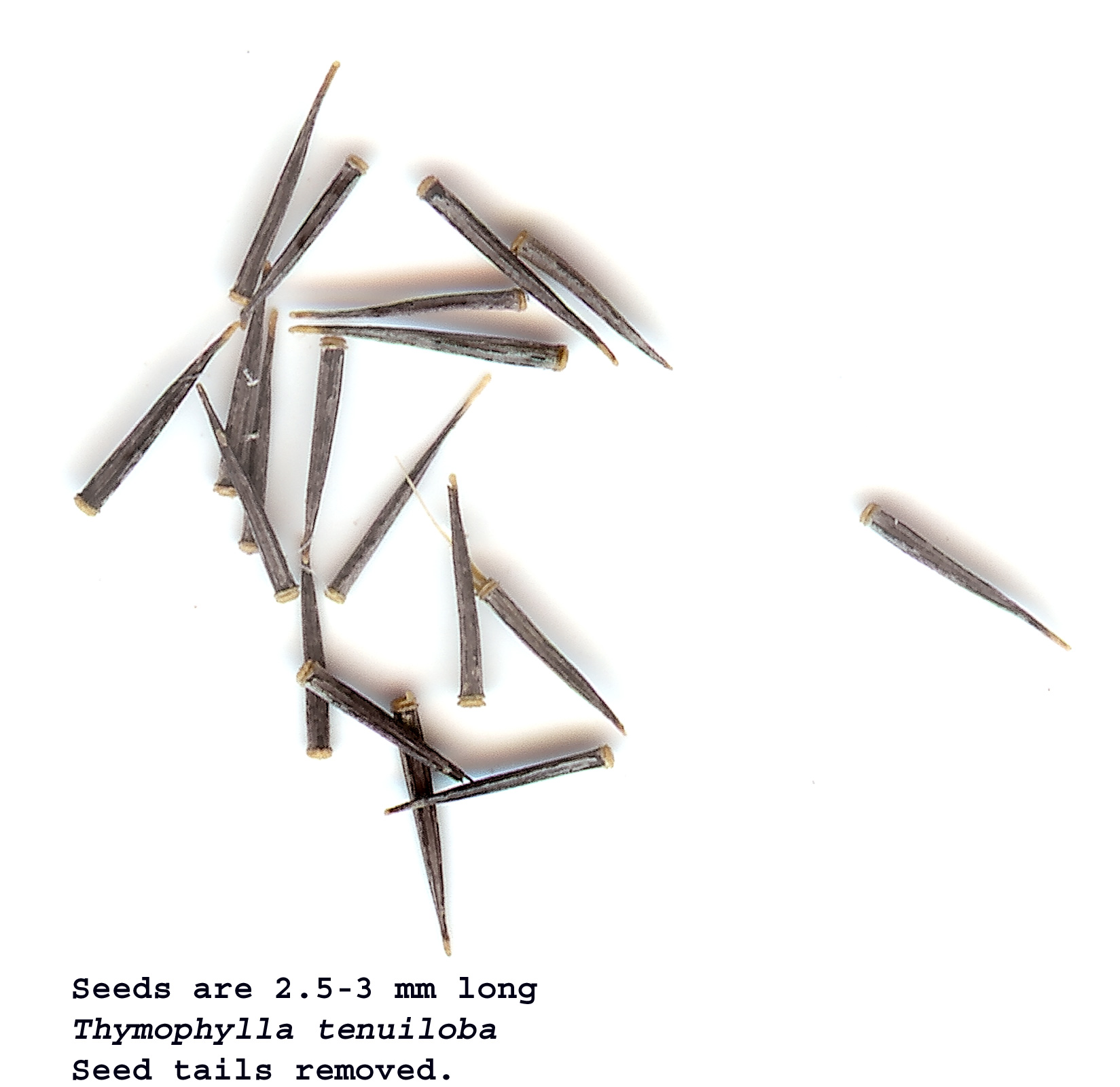
Seeds of Thymophylla tenuiloba

Thymophylla is a genus of perennial flowering plants in the tribe Tageteae within the family Asteraceae. Pricklyleaf is a common name for plants in this genus.

The generic name is derived from the Greek words θύμον (thymon), meaning "thyme", and φύλλον (phyllon), meaning "leaf".

Species

- Thymophylla acerosa (DC.) Strother – pricklyleaf dogweed, Texas dogweed - TX NM AZ UT NV
- Thymophylla aurantiaca (Brandegee) Rydb. - Puebla, Oaxaca
- Thymophylla aurea (A.Gray) Greene ex Britton – manyawn pricklyleaf - TX NM CO KS Chihuahua, Coahuila, Durango
- Thymophylla concinna (A.Gray) Strother – Sonoran pricklyleaf - AZ (Pima County) Sonora
- Thymophylla gentryi (M.C.Johnst.) Strother - Durango
- Thymophylla gypsophila (B.L.Turner) Strother - Coahuila
- Thymophylla micropoides (DC.) Strother – woolly pricklyleaf - TX Chihuahua, Coahuila, Durango, Hidalgo, Nuevo León, San Luis Potosí, Tamaulipas
- Thymophylla mutica (M.C.Johnst.) Strother - Tamaulipas
- Thymophylla pentachaeta (DC.) Small – five-needle pricklyleaf - TX Chihuahua, Sonora, Jalisco, Nuevo León, Aguascalientes, Baja California, Tamaulipas, Zacatecas
- Thymophylla setifolia Lag. – Texas pricklyleaf - TX NM Aguascalientes, Chihuahua, Coahuila, Durango, Guanajuato, Hidalgo, Nuevo León, Querétaro, San Luis Potosí, Tamaulipas, Zacatecas, Veracruz
- Thymophylla tenuifolia (Cass.) Rydb. - México State, Tlaxcala, Puebla, Coahuila, Durango, Hidalgo, Nuevo León, Zacatecas
- Thymophylla tenuiloba (DC.) Small – bristleleaf pricklyleaf - TX NM Coahuila, Nuevo León, Nayarit, Tamaulipas
- Thymophylla tephroleuca (S.F.Blake) Strother – ashy pricklyleaf, ashy dogweed - TX

formerly included

see Adenophyllum

- Thymophylla anomala - Adenophyllum anomalum
- Thymophylla neomexicana - Adenophyllum wriightii
