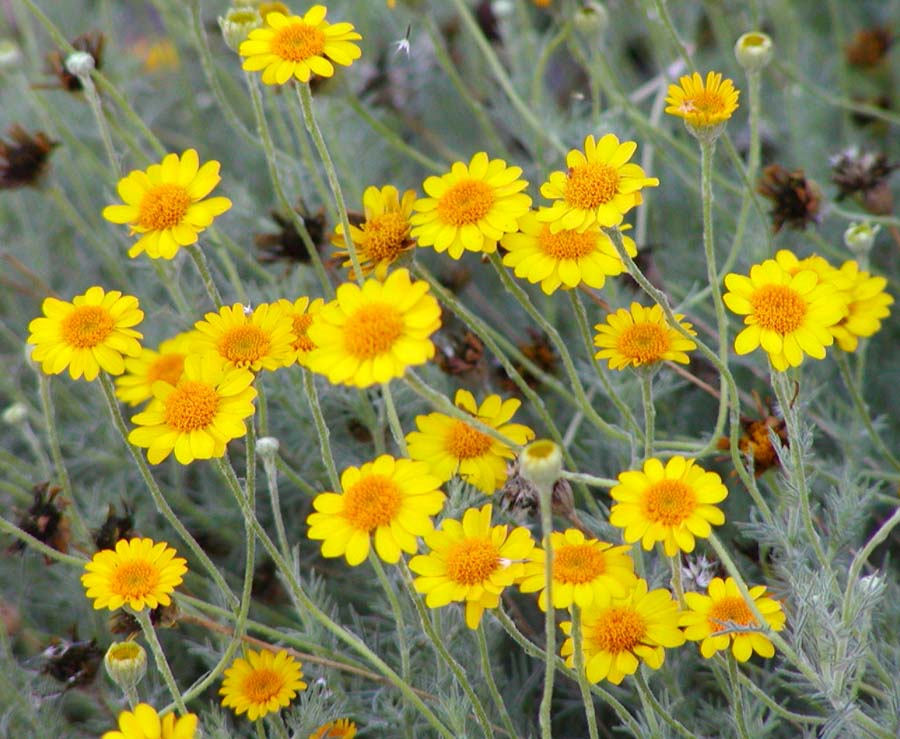

Scientific classification
- Kingdom: Plantae
- Clade: Tracheophytes
- Clade: Angiosperms
- Clade: Eudicots
- Clade: Asterids
- Order: Asterales
- Family: Asteraceae
- Genus: Thymophylla
- Species: T. pentachaeta

Binomial name
- Thymophylla pentachaeta (DC.) Small

Synonyms
- Dyssodia pentachaeta (DC.) B.L.Rob.; Hymenatherum pentachaetum DC.

= Thymophylla pentachaeta =

Species of plant

Thymophylla pentachaeta, also known as fiveneedle pricklyleaf, golden dyssodia or dogweed, is a perennial or subshrub in the family Asteraceae.

The plant grows up to 20 centimetres (8 in) tall. The leaves are about 1.5 cm (1/2 in) long and pinnately divided. From April to October, atop leafless stalks are solitary yellow flower heads, 13 millimetres (1/2 in) wide, with 8–13 rays surrounding disk flowers. T. acerosa is woodier, with leaves closer to the flowers.

Four varieties are recognised:

- Thymophylla pentachaeta var. belenidium (DC.) Strother
- Thymophylla pentachaeta var. hartwegii (A.Gray) Strother
- Thymophylla pentachaeta var. pentachaeta
- Thymophylla pentachaeta var. puberula (Rydb.) Strother

The species is native to the southwestern and south-central United States, Mexico, and Argentina, being found in arid climates.
