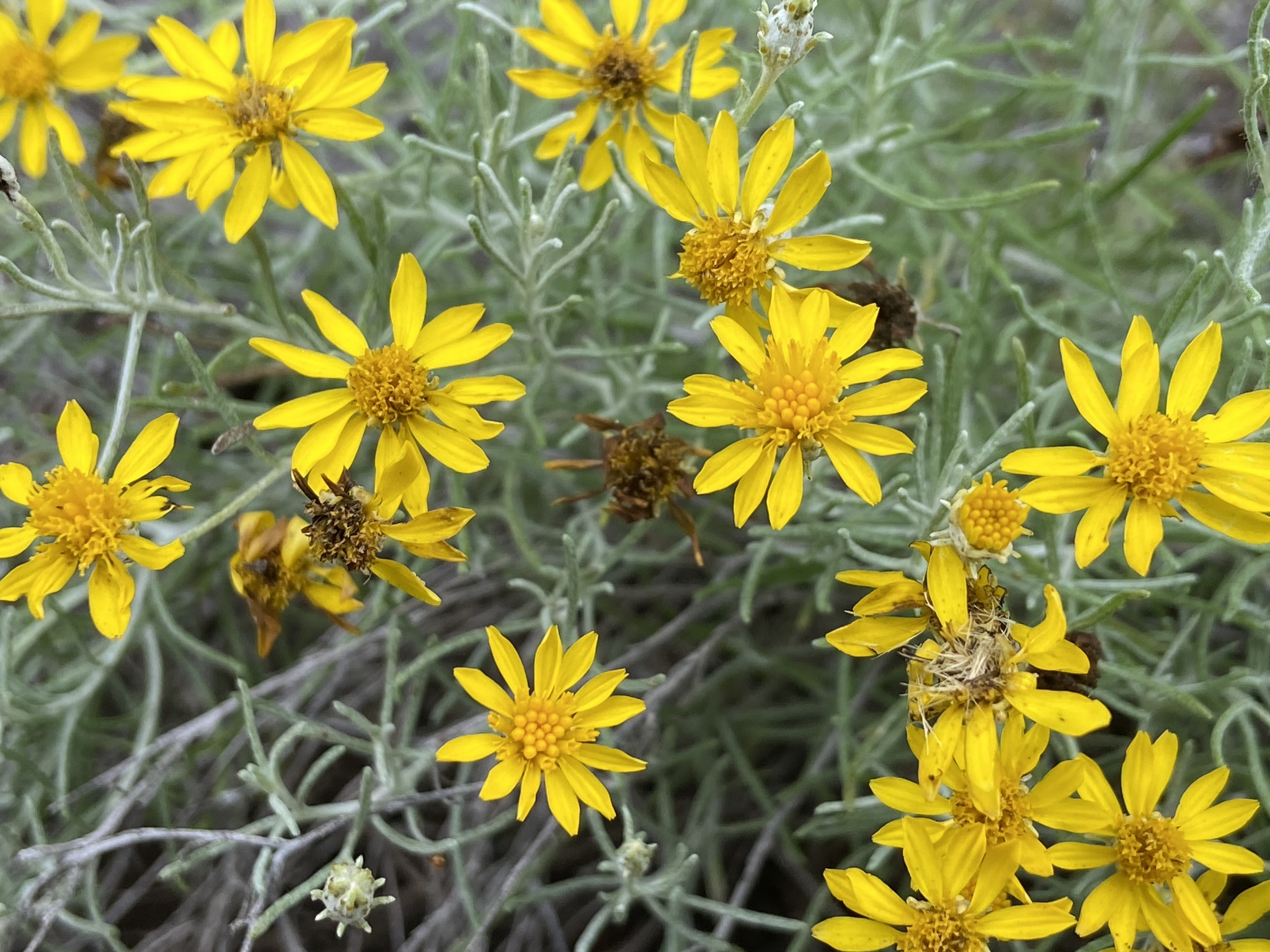

Conservation status
- Imperiled (NatureServe)

Scientific classification
- Kingdom: Plantae
- Clade: Embryophytes
- Clade: Tracheophytes
- Clade: Spermatophytes
- Clade: Angiosperms
- Clade: Eudicots
- Clade: Asterids
- Order: Asterales
- Family: Asteraceae
- Genus: Thymophylla
- Species: T. tephroleuca

Binomial name
- Thymophylla tephroleuca (S.F.Blake) Strother

Synonyms
- Dyssodia tephroleuca

= Thymophylla tephroleuca =

Species of plant

Thymophylla tephroleuca (formerly Dyssodia tephroleuca) is a rare species of flowering plant known by the common names ashy pricklyleaf and ashy dogweed. It is endemic to Texas in the United States, where it occurs in two counties near the Mexican border. It became rare due to the destruction and degradation of its habitat. It is a federally listed endangered species of the United States.

== Description ==
This plant, a shrub or subshrub, produces a clump of stems up to 30 centimeters tall. The herbage is ashy gray-green, gray, or whitish due to a layer of white woolly hairs. The leaves are linear to threadlike and are arranged alternately along the stems. They measure 1 to 1.5 centimeters long. The inflorescence is a flower head with a bell-shaped involucre of woolly-haired phyllaries. There are 12 or 13 yellow ray florets and about 30 disc florets at the center. The fruit is an achene with a pappus of scales. Blooming occurs mostly in March through May but it may bloom at other times depending on rainfall.

== Habitat ==
Thymophylla tephroleuca prefers fine sand or sandy-loam soils. Its current habitat is predominately shrub-invaded grasslands.

This plant is likely a relict, a rare species remaining in a grassland habitat type that was once more common. Most of the local territory has converted to brushland dominated by cenizo (Leucophyllum frutescens) blackbrush (Coleogyne ramosissima), and creosote bush (Larrea tridentata). Other dominant plant species include mesquite (Prosopis glandulosa), goatbush (Castela texana), anacahuita (Cordia boissieri), and javelina brush (Microrhamnus ericoides). The introduced buffelgrass (Cenchrus ciliaris) is common.

== Conservation ==
By 1979 this plant was known from a 1-acre (0.0040 km^{2}) in Zapata County, Texas. By the time the plant was placed on the Endangered Species List in 1984, there was a single population containing about 1300 plants bisected by a highway. More populations have been found in the years since, and currently there are six in Zapata and Webb Counties.

Highway maintenance is an ongoing threat to the species, as the plant grows directly next to a highway. Dying plants have been observed at the highway's edge, a possible sign of herbicide application. The installation of a gas pipeline likely destroyed some plants and its maintenance is a threat to others in the area. Grazing is not a direct threat because cattle do not eat the foul-smelling plant, but their trampling may compact the soil. The introduction of buffelgrass for better grazing has led to drastic changes in the plant community, because it spreads and competes easily with other species.
