= Thymophylla acerosa =

Scientific classification
- Kingdom: Plantae
- Clade: Tracheophytes
- Clade: Angiosperms
- Clade: Eudicots
- Clade: Asterids
- Order: Asterales
- Family: Asteraceae
- Genus: Thymophylla
- Species: T. acerosa

Binomial name
- Thymophylla acerosa (DC.) Strother

Synonyms
- Aciphyllaea acerosa (DC.) A.Gray; Dyssodia acerosa DC.; Hymenatherum acerosum (DC.) A.Gray; Dyssodia fusca A.Nelson

Species of flowering plant

Thymophylla acerosa is a species of flowering plant from the United States and Mexico.
