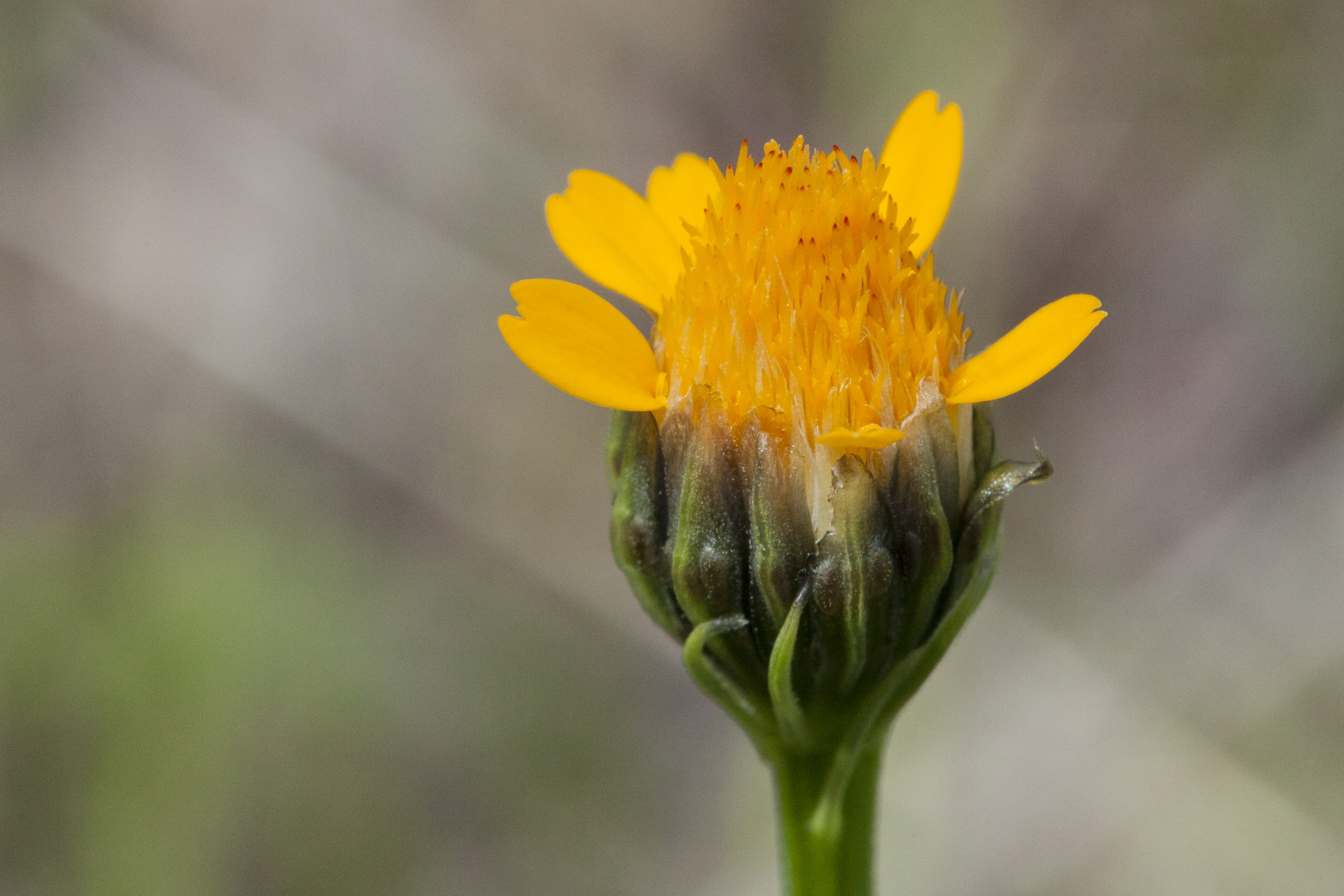
- San Felipe dogweed (Adenophyllum wrightii)

Scientific classification
- Kingdom: Plantae
- Clade: Tracheophytes
- Clade: Angiosperms
- Clade: Eudicots
- Clade: Asterids
- Order: Asterales
- Family: Asteraceae
- Genus: Adenophyllum
- Species: A. wrightii

Binomial name
- Adenophyllum wrightii A.Gray

Synonyms
- Hymenatherum neo-mexicanum A.Gray; Hymenatherum neomexicanum A.Gray; Adenophyllum pulcherrimum (Strother) Villarreal; Dyssodia neomexicana (A.Gray) B.L.Rob.; Thymophylla neomexicana (A.Gray) Wooton & Standl.

= Adenophyllum wrightii =

Species of flowering plant

Adenophyllum wrightii is a North American species of flowering plants in the family Asteraceae known by the common names San Felipe dogweed, San Felipe dyssodia and Wright's dogweed. It is native to Mexico and the US States of Arizona and New Mexico. The species was long thought to be extinct in New Mexico, but live populations were rediscovered in the state in 1999.
