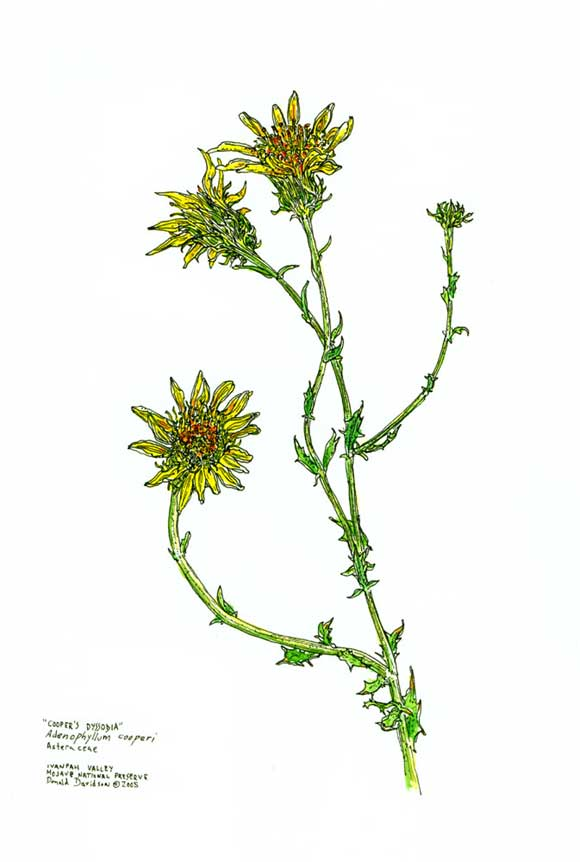
- Adenophyllum cooperi Work of the US National Park Service
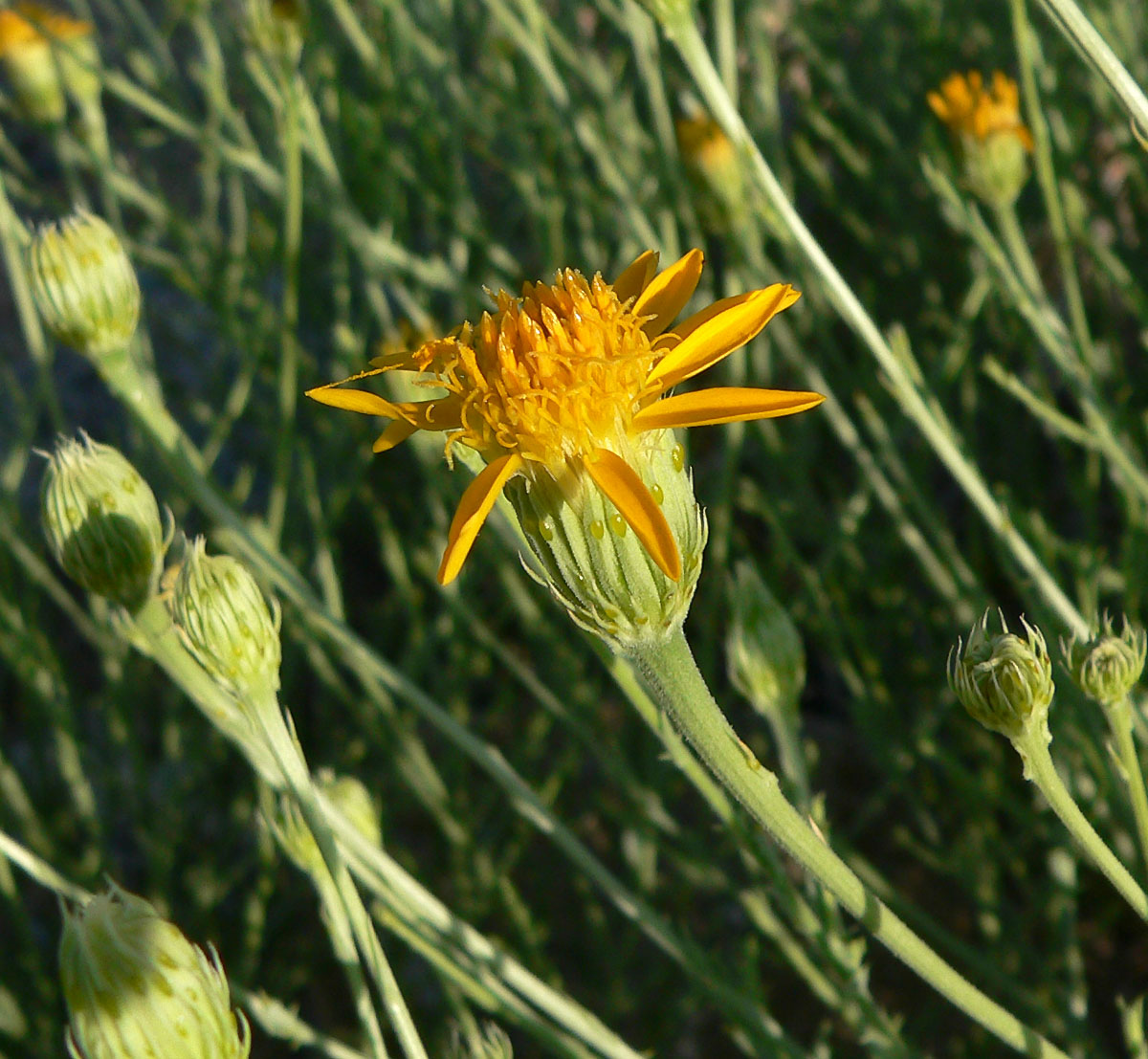
- Adenophyllum cooperi

Scientific classification
- Kingdom: Plantae
- Clade: Tracheophytes
- Clade: Angiosperms
- Clade: Eudicots
- Clade: Asterids
- Order: Asterales
- Family: Asteraceae
- Subfamily: Asteroideae
- Tribe: Tageteae
- Subtribe: Pectidinae
- Genus: Adenophyllum; Pers.

Synonyms
- Dyssodia sect. Adenophyllum (Pers.) O.Hoffm.; Lebetina Cass.; Trichaetolepis Rydb.; Dyssodia Willd. 1809, illegitimate homonym not Cav. 1802; Willdenowa Cav.; Schlechtendalia Willd. 1803, rejected name, not Less. 1830

= Adenophyllum =

Genus of flowering plants

Adenophyllum is a small genus of plants in the tribe Tageteae within the family Asteraceae. It contains ten species known generally as dogweeds.

These are gangly, daisylike or thistlelike plants with yellow or reddish flowers. They are native primarily to the southwestern United States and northern Mexico, where they are most common in desert regions.

Species

- Adenophyllum anomalum (Canby & Rose) Strother – Sonora, Sinaloa, Durango
- Adenophyllum appendiculatum (Lag.) Strother – Chiapas, Oaxaca, Guerrero, Colima, Michoacán, Guerrero
- Adenophyllum aurantium (L.) Strother – Oaxaca
- Adenophyllum cooperi (A.Gray) Strother – Cooper's dyssodia, Cooper's dogweed - United States (California Nevada Arizona Utah)
- Adenophyllum glandulosum (Cav.) Strother – Oaxaca
- Adenophyllum porophylloides (A.Gray) Strother – San Felipe dogweed – Baja California, Baja California Sur, Sonora, United States (California Nevada Arizona)
- Adenophyllum porophyllum (Cav.) Hemsl. – poreleaf dogweed – Mexico, Central America, Cuba, United States (Cochise County in Arizona)
- Adenophyllum pulcherrimum (Strother) Villarreal
- Adenophyllum speciosum (A.Gray) Strother – Baja California, Baja California Sur
- Adenophyllum squamosum (A.Gray) Strother – Jalisco, Nayarit, Sinaloa, Colima
- Adenophyllum wrightii A.Gray – Wright's dogweed – Mexico, United States (Arizona New Mexico)
- Adenophyllum yecoranum B.L.Turner
