= A. cuneatus =

A. cuneatus may refer to:

- Abacetus cuneatus, a ground beetle
- Abaraeus cuneatus, a longhorn beetle found in Cameroon
- Acianthus cuneatus, New England mosquito orchid, a plant found in Australia
- Adenanthos cuneatus, a shrub native to Western Australia
- Aplopappus cuneatus or Aster cuneatus, synonyms of Ericameria cuneata, a flowering shrub native to the southwestern United States and northwestern Mexico
- Asiagomphus cuneatus, a clubtail dragonfly found in China
- Asymphorodes cuneatus, a moth found in French Polynesia
- Atractosteus cuneatus
- Atylus cuneatus, a synonym of Isopogon cuneatus, coneflower, a plant found in Western Australia
