= Abaraeus =

Scientific classification
- Domain: Eukaryota
- Kingdom: Animalia
- Phylum: Arthropoda
- Class: Insecta
- Order: Coleoptera
- Suborder: Polyphaga
- Infraorder: Cucujiformia
- Family: Cerambycidae
- Tribe: Pteropliini
- Genus: Abaraeus; Jordan, 1903

Genus of beetles

Abaraeus is a genus of longhorn beetles of the subfamily Lamiinae, containing the following species:

- Abaraeus cuneatus Jordan, 1903
- Abaraeus curvidens Aurivillius, 1908
