= Abaraeus curvidens =

Scientific classification
- Domain: Eukaryota
- Kingdom: Animalia
- Phylum: Arthropoda
- Class: Insecta
- Order: Coleoptera
- Suborder: Polyphaga
- Infraorder: Cucujiformia
- Family: Cerambycidae
- Tribe: Pteropliini
- Genus: Abaraeus
- Species: A. curvidens

Binomial name
- Abaraeus curvidens Aurivillius, 1908

Species of beetle

Abaraeus curvidens is a species of beetle in the family Cerambycidae. It was described by Per Olof Christopher Aurivillius in 1908. It is known from South Africa.
