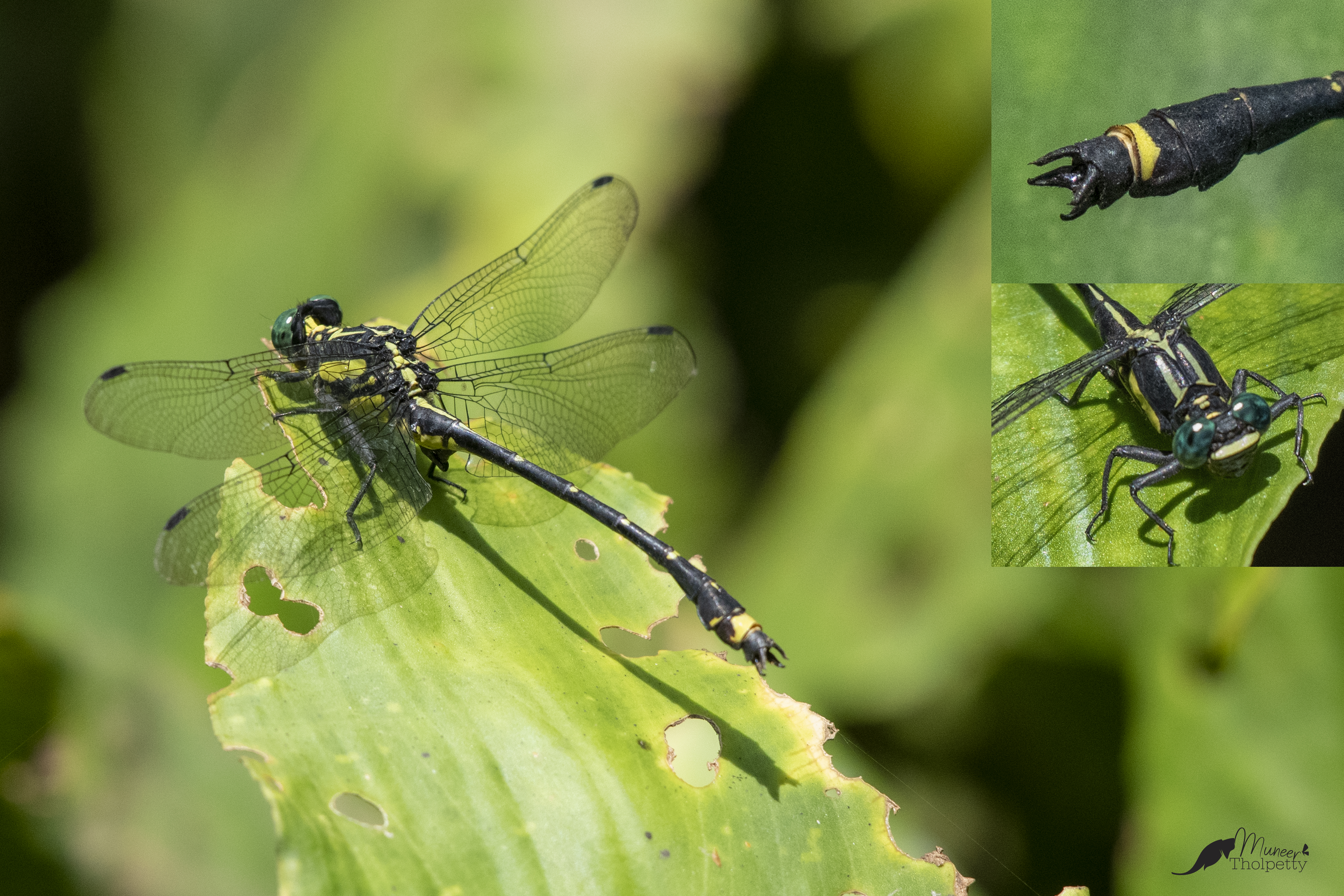
- Male

Conservation status
- Least Concern (IUCN 3.1)

Scientific classification
- Kingdom: Animalia
- Phylum: Arthropoda
- Class: Insecta
- Order: Odonata
- Infraorder: Anisoptera
- Family: Gomphidae
- Genus: Asiagomphus
- Species: A. nilgiricus

Binomial name
- Asiagomphus nilgiricus (Laidlaw, 1922)

= Asiagomphus nilgiricus =

Species of dragonfly

Asiagomphus nilgiricus, is a species of dragonfly in the family Gomphidae. It is found in South India.

== See also ==
- List of odonates of India
- List of odonata of Kerala
