= Asiagomphus yayeyamensis =

Conservation status
- Endangered (IUCN 2.3)

Scientific classification
- Kingdom: Animalia
- Phylum: Arthropoda
- Clade: Pancrustacea
- Class: Insecta
- Order: Odonata
- Infraorder: Anisoptera
- Family: Gomphidae
- Genus: Asiagomphus
- Species: A. yayeyamensis

Binomial name
- Asiagomphus yayeyamensis (Matsumura in Oguma, 1926)

Species of dragonfly

Asiagomphus yayeyamensis is a species of dragonfly in the family Gomphidae. It is endemic to Japan.
