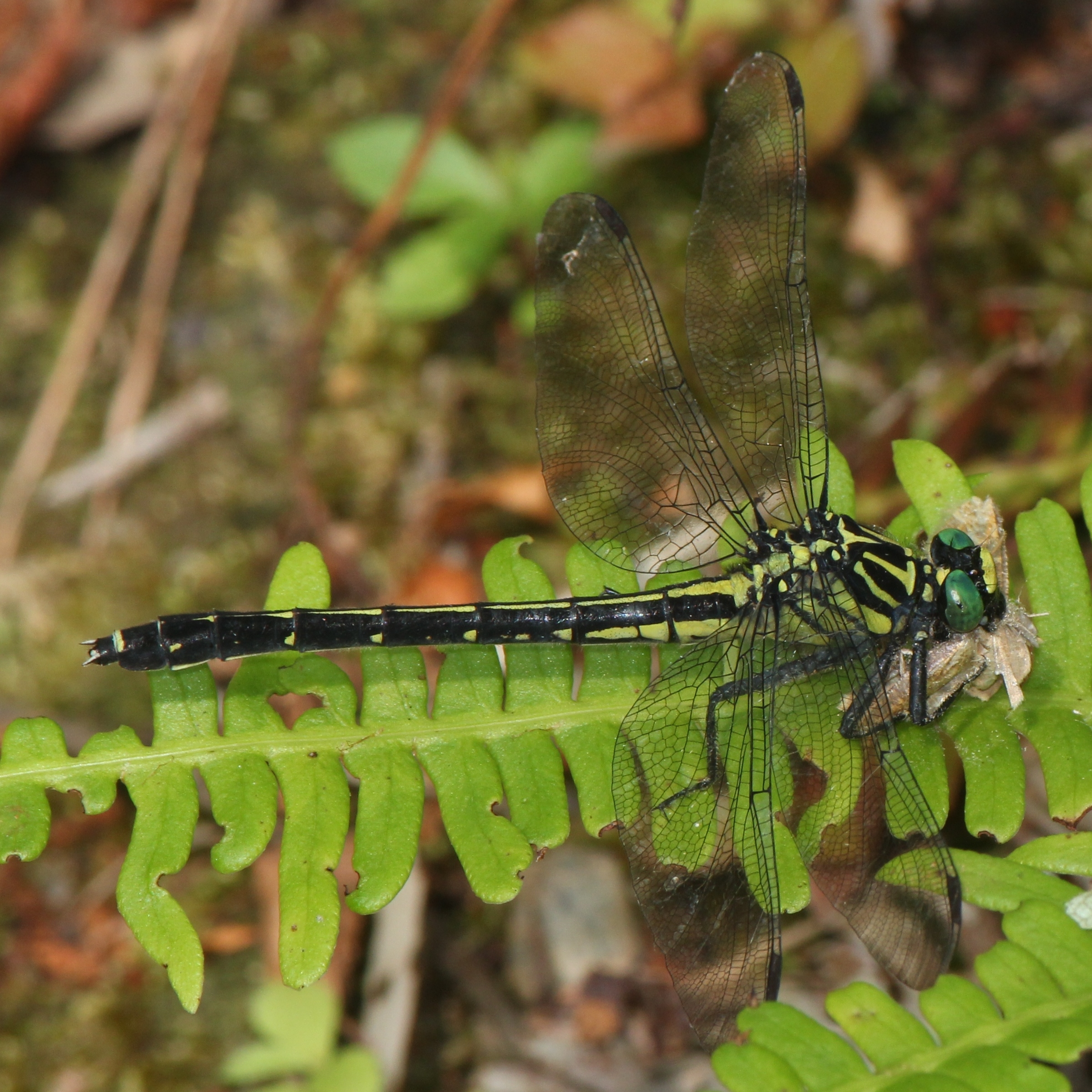
- Asiagomphus melaenops

Scientific classification
- Kingdom: Animalia
- Phylum: Arthropoda
- Class: Insecta
- Order: Odonata
- Infraorder: Anisoptera
- Family: Gomphidae
- Genus: Asiagomphus; Asahina, 1985

= Asiagomphus =

Genus of dragonflies

Asiagomphus is a genus of dragonfly in the family Gomphidae. It contains the following species:

- Asiagomphus amamiensis (Asahina, 1962)
- Asiagomphus auricolor (Fraser, 1926)
- Asiagomphus coreanus (Doi & Okumura, 1937)
- Asiagomphus corniger (Morton, 1928)
- Asiagomphus cuneatus (Needham, 1930)
- Asiagomphus giza Wilson, 2005
- Asiagomphus gongshanensis Yang, Mao & Zhang, 2006
- Asiagomphus hainanensis (Chao, 1953)
- Asiagomphus hesperius (Chao, 1953)
- Asiagomphus kosterini Kompier, 2018
- Asiagomphus melaenops (Selys, 1854)
- Asiagomphus melanopsoides (Doi, 1943)
- Asiagomphus monticola Kompier, 2018
- Asiagomphus motuoensis Liu & Chao in Chao, 1990
- Asiagomphus nilgiricus (Laidlaw, 1922)
- Asiagomphus odoneli (Fraser, 1922)
- Asiagomphus pacatus (Chao, 1953)
- Asiagomphus pacificus (Chao, 1953)
- Asiagomphus perlaetus (Chao, 1953)
- Asiagomphus personatus (Selys, 1873)
- Asiagomphus pryeri (Selys, 1883)
- Asiagomphus septimus (Needham, 1930)
- Asiagomphus somnolens (Needham, 1930)
- Asiagomphus superciliaris Kompier, 2018
- Asiagomphus xanthenatus (Williamson, 1907)
- Asiagomphus yayeyamensis (Matsumura in Oguma, 1926)
