= Abacetus cuneatus =

Scientific classification
- Kingdom: Animalia
- Phylum: Arthropoda
- Class: Insecta
- Order: Coleoptera
- Suborder: Adephaga
- Family: Carabidae
- Genus: Abacetus
- Species: A. cuneatus

Binomial name
- Abacetus cuneatus (Fairmaire, 1887)

Species of beetle

Abacetus cuneatus is a species of ground beetle in the subfamily Pterostichinae. It was described by Fairmaire in 1887.
