= Asiagomphus cuneatus =

Scientific classification
- Domain: Eukaryota
- Kingdom: Animalia
- Phylum: Arthropoda
- Class: Insecta
- Order: Odonata
- Infraorder: Anisoptera
- Family: Gomphidae
- Genus: Asiagomphus
- Species: A. cuneatus

Binomial name
- Asiagomphus cuneatus (Needham, 1930)

Species of dragonfly

Asiagomphus cuneatus is a clubtail dragonfly whose naiads are commonly eaten in parts of Yunnan, China. The species was first described by Needham in 1930.
