= Abaraeus cuneatus =

Scientific classification
- Kingdom: Animalia
- Phylum: Arthropoda
- Class: Insecta
- Order: Coleoptera
- Suborder: Polyphaga
- Infraorder: Cucujiformia
- Family: Cerambycidae
- Genus: Abaraeus
- Species: A. cuneatus

Binomial name
- Abaraeus cuneatus Jordan, 1903

Species of beetle

Abaraeus cuneatus is a species of beetle in the family Cerambycidae which can be found in Grand Batanga, Cameroon.

== Description ==
A cuneatus is 18 millimetres (0.71 in) long with 13 millimetres (0.51 in) of which is its elytra. It is blackish-brown on top and have olive-chocolate coloured and smooth bottom. It have clay coloured tarsi and tibiae. Antenna is pubescent with short white hairs. Legs and bottom are covered with same coloured hairs as well. Its prothorax have a sharp sulci which have large punctures and tubercle.
