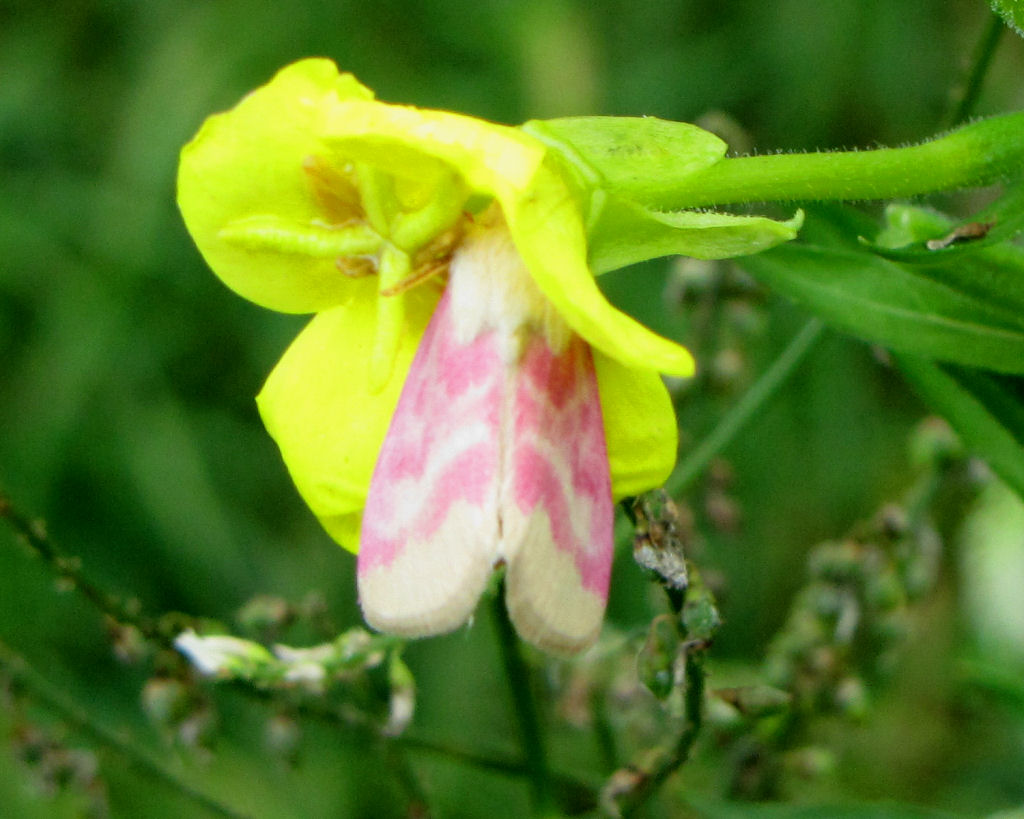
- Primrose moth (S. florida) on evening-primrose

Scientific classification
- Kingdom: Animalia
- Phylum: Arthropoda
- Clade: Pancrustacea
- Class: Insecta
- Order: Lepidoptera
- Superfamily: Noctuoidea
- Family: Noctuidae
- Subfamily: Heliothinae
- Genus: Schinia; Hübner, 1823

Synonyms
- Anthoecia Boisduval, 1840; Alaria Duncan & Westwood, 1841 (precocc.); Trypana Guenée, 1841; Oria Guenée, 1852 (preocc.); Rhodophora Guenée, 1852; Tamila Guenée, 1852; Euleucyptera Grote, 1865; Lygranthoecia Grote & Robinson, 1873; Tricopis Grote, 1874; Adonisea Grote, 1875; Heliophana Grote, 1875; Oxylos Grote, 1875; Pippona Harvey, 1875; Porrima Grote, 1877; Rhododipsa Grote, 1877; Bessula Grote, 1881; Dasyspoudaea Smith, 1883; Trileuca Grote, 1883; Pseudotamila Smith, 1893; Canidia Grote, 1890; Eupanychis Grote, 1890; Trichosellus Grote, 1890; Thyreion Smith, 1891; Incita Grote, 1895; Palada Smith, 1900; Chlorocleptria Hampson, 1903

= Schinia =

Genus of moths

Schinia, commonly called flower moths, is a large genus of moths belonging to the family Noctuidae. The genus has a Holarctic distribution with the vast majority of species being found in North America, many with a very restricted range and larval food plant.

== Species and food plants ==
Scientific name	Common name	Synonyms	Larval food plant
Schinia accessa Smith, 1906			Artemisia
Schinia acutilinea (Grote, 1878)	Angled gem, acute-lined flower moth	Schinia separata Grote, 1879, Schinia velutina Barnes & McDunnough, 1912	
Schinia aetheria Barnes & McDunnough, 1912			
Schinia albafascia Smith, 1883			
Schinia alencis Harvey, 1875			
Schinia amaryllis Smith, 1891		Heliophana amaryllis	Ambrosia
Schinia angulilinea Hardwick, 1996		Schinia arizonensis	
Schinia antonio Smith, 1906			Aphanostephus
Schinia arcigera Guenée, 1852	Arcigera flower moth	Schinia arcifera; Schinia spraguei; Schinia limbalis	Aster, Chloracantha spinosa, Psilactis tenuis
Schinia arefacta H. Edwards, 1884	Arefacta flower moth		
Schinia argentifascia Barnes & McDunnough, 1912			Ericameria
Schinia aurantiaca H. Edwards, 1881		Annaphila aurantiaca H. Edwards, 1881, Schinia californica (Hampson, 1903), Pyrocleptria californica Hampson, 1903	Eriastrum sapphirinum, Gilia
Schinia avemensis Dyar, 1904	Gold-edged gem		Helianthus petiolaris
Schinia bicuspida Smith, 1891			Isocoma drummondii, Machaeranthera annua
Schinia biforma Smith, 1906			Amblyolepis setigera
Schinia bimatris (Harvey, 1875)	White flower moth	Pippona bimatris Harvey, 1875, Lygranthoecia bimatris (Harvey, 1875)	
Schinia bina Guenée, 1852	Bina flower moth		Chloracantha spinosa, Gaillardia pulchella, Tetraneuris linearifolia, Verbesina encelioides
Schinia biundulata Smith, 1891			Gilia cana
Schinia brunnea Barnes & McDunnough, 1913			
Schinia buta Smith, 1907			Brickellia californica
Schinia cardui (Hübner, 1790)			Picris hieracioides
Schinia carrizoensis Osborne, 2010	Carrizo flower moth		
Schinia carminatra Smith, 1903			
Schinia carmosina Neumoegen, 1883	Maroon-washed flower moth		Carphephorus corymbosus, Garberia heterophylla
Schinia carolinensis Barnes & McDunnough, 1911			
Schinia chilensis (Hampson, 1903)		Chloridea chilensis Hampson, 1903	
Schinia chryselloides Pogue & Harp, 2005			
Schinia chrysella Grote, 1874		Schinia lanul Strecker, [1878]	Amphiachyris dracunculoides
Schinia ciliata Smith, 1900			Gutierrezia sarothrae
Schinia citrinella Grote & Robinson, 1870			Croton
Schinia coercita Grote, 1881		Schinia alensa Smith, 1906	
Schinia cognata (Freyer, 1833)			Chondrilla juncea
Schinia crenilinea Smith, 1891	Creniline flower moth		
Schinia crotchii (H. Edwards, 1875)			
Schinia cumatilis Grote, 1865	Silver-banded gem		Artemisia frigida
Schinia cupes Grote, 1875		Schinia crotchii H. Edwards, 1875; Schinia navarra; Trichosellus cupes	Camissonia claviformis, Castilleja exserta
Schinia deserticola Barnes & McDunnough, 1916			Camissonia claviformis
Schinia diffusa Smith, 1891		Schinia neglecta Strecker, 1898	Machaeranthera annua
Schinia dobla Smith, 1906			Ambrosia dumosa
Schinia edwardsii Smith, 1906			
Schinia erosa Smith, 1906			Isocoma acradenia
Schinia errans Smith, 1883		Lygranthoecia errans	Machaeranthera tanacetifolia
Schinia erythrias Pogue, 2006		Schinia pulchra	
Schinia felicitata Smith, 1894			Oenothera deltoides
Schinia ferrisi Pogue & Harp, 2004			
Schinia florida Guenée, 1852	Primrose moth		Oenothera
Schinia fulleri McElvare, 1961	Fuller's flower moth		Balduina angustifolia
Schinia gabrielae Badilla & Angulo, 1998			
Schinia gaurae J. E. Smith, 1797	Clouded crimson		Gaura
Schinia gracilenta Hübner, 1818	Slender flower moth	Schinia bifascia Hübner, 1818	Brickellia eupatorioides, Iva annua, Ambrosia trifida, Eupatorium purpureum
Schinia grandimedia Hardwick 1996	Rockies boneset flower moth		
Schinia graefiana Tepper, 1882		Heliothis graefiana; Schinia triolata	Chaenactis
Schinia hanga Strecker, 1898			
Schinia hardwickorum Opler 2004			
Schinia honesta Grote, 1881	Black-spotted gem		
Schinia hulstia Tepper, 1883	Hulst flower moth	Schinia tenuescens Grote, 1883	
Schinia illustra Smith, 1906			
Schinia immaculata Pogue, 2004			
Schinia imperialis (Staudinger, 1871)			Cephalaria procera
Schinia indiana Smith, 1908	Phlox moth		Phlox pilosa
Schinia intermontana Hardwick, 1958			Erigeron
Schinia intrabilis Smith, 1893			Pluchea sericea
Schinia jaegeri G. H. Sperry, 1940			Xylorhiza
Schinia jaguarina Guenée, 1852	Jaguar flower moth	Schinia demaculata	Baptisia, Pediomelum rhombifolium, Psoralidium tenuiflorum, Trifolium
Schinia ligeae Smith, 1893			Machaeranthera canescens, Xylorhiza tortifolia
Schinia lucens Morrison, 1875	Leadplant flower moth, false indigo flower moth		Amorpha
Schinia luxa Grote, 1881		Bessula luxa Grote, 1881	
Schinia lynda Troubridge, 2002			
Schinia lynx Guenée, 1852	Lynx flower moth		Erigeron, Heterotheca subaxillaris
Schinia mcfarlandi Opler, 2004			
Schinia macneilli Hardwick 1996			
Schinia maculata Pogue, 2004		Schinia blanca	
Schinia masoni Smith, 1896	Blanket flower moth	Schinia aden Strecker, 1898	Gaillardia aristata
Schinia meadi Grote, 1873	Mead's flower moth		
Schinia mexicana Hampson, 1903		Adonisea mexicana; Eupanychis mexicana	
Schinia miniana (Grote, 1881)	Desert-marigold moth	Schinia pallicincta Smith, 1906	Baileya
Schinia mitis Grote, 1873	Matutinal flower moth		Pyrrhopappus
Schinia mortua Grote, 1865			Grindelia, Haplopappus
Schinia niveicosta Smith, 1906			Palafoxia linearis
Schinia nubila Strecker, 1876	Camphorweed flower moth, brown flower moth	Schinia dolosa Strecker, 1898; Schinia lora Strecker, 1898	Heterotheca subaxillaris, Solidago
Schinia nuchalis Grote, 1878			
Schinia nundina Drury, [1773]	Goldenrod flower moth		Aster, Solidago
Schinia obliqua Smith, 1883			
Schinia obscurata Strecker, 1898	Obscure schinia moth	Schinia tanena Strecker, 1898	Erigeron
Schinia oculata Smith, 1900		Schinia macroptica	Baccharis sarothroides
Schinia oleagina Morrison, 1875		Schinia sara Smith, 1907; Schinia baueri McElvare, 1951; Schinia ernesta Smith, 1907	Brickellia
Schinia oliva (Martyn, 1797)			
Schinia olivacea Smith, 1906			Hermannia texana, Sphaeralcea lindheimeri
Schinia parmeliana H. Edwards, 1882			
Schinia perminuta H. Edwards, 1881	Western small flower moth	Schinia dubitans; Pseudotamila perminuta	
Schinia persimilis Grote, 1873	Persimilis flower moth		
Schinia petulans H. Edwards, 1884	Impatient flower moth		Chrysopsis subulata
Schinia poguei Metzler & Forbes, 2011			
Schinia psamathea Pogue, 2010			
Schinia pulchripennis Grote, 1874	Common flower moth		Castilleja exserta
Schinia purpurascens (Tauscher, 1809)			
Schinia regia Strecker, 1876			Vernonia texana
Schinia regina Pogue & Harp, 2003	Reginia primrose moth		
Schinia reniformis Smith, 1900			
Schinia rivulosa Guenée, 1852	Ragweed flower moth		Ambrosia
Schinia roseitincta Harvey, 1875			
Schinia rufipenna Hardwick, 1983			Pityopsis graminifolia
Schinia rufocostulata Pogue & Harp, 2005			
Schinia sanguinea Geyer, 1832	Bleeding flower moth	Schinia gloriosa Strecker, 1878; Schinia terrifica Barnes & McDunnough, 1918	Liatris
Schinia sanrafaeli Opler, 2004			
Schinia saturata Grote, 1874	Brown flower moth		Heterotheca subaxillaris, Pityopsis graminifolia
Schinia scarletina Smith, 1900			Stephanomeria
Schinia scissa Grote, 1876			
Schinia scissoides Benjamin, 1936	Divided flower moth		
Schinia scutosa (Denis & Schiffermüller, 1775)	Spotted clover		
Schinia septentrionalis Walker, 1858	Northern flower moth		Aster
Schinia sexata Smith, 1906			Erigeron glabellus
Schinia sexplagiata Smith, 1891			Ambrosia psilostachya
Schinia simplex Smith, 1891			Ipomoea leptophylla
Schinia siren Strecker, 1876	Aluring schinia moth	Schinia inclara Strecker, 1876	Verbesina encelioides
Schinia snowi (Grote, 1875)			
Schinia sordida Smith, 1883	Sordid flower moth	Schinia approximata Strecker, 1898; Schinia ar Strecker, 1898; Schinia labe Strecker, 1898	Pityopsis pinifolia
Schinia spinosae Guenée, 1852	Spinose flower moth		Pityopsis falcata
Schinia subspinosae Hardwick 1996			
Schinia sueta Grote, 1873			Lupinus
Schinia tertia Grote, 1874		Tamila tertia Grote, 1874	Ericameria, Isocoma pluriflora, Liatris
Schinia thoreaui Grote & Robinson, 1870	Thoreau's flower moth		Ambrosia
Schinia tobia Smith, 1906			Dicoria canescens
Schinia trifascia Hübner, 1818	Three-lined flower moth		Brickellia, Eupatorium, Liatris
Schinia tuberculum Hübner, 1827-31			Pityopsis graminifolia
Schinia ultima Strecker, 1876			
Schinia unimacula Smith, 1891	Rabbitbush flower moth		Ericameria, Haplopappus
Schinia vacciniae H. Edwards, 1875			
Schinia varix Knudson, Bordelon & Pogue, 2003			Gaillardia
Schinia velaris Grote, 1878			Lepidospartum squamatum
Schinia verna Hardwick, 1983	Verna's flower moth		Antennaria
Schinia villosa Grote, 1864	Little dark gem		Aster, Erigeron, Eucephalus ledophyllus
Schinia volupia Fitch, 1868	Painted schinia moth		Gaillardia pulchella
Schinia walsinghami H. Edwards, 1881		Schinia balba Grote, 1881	Chrysothamnus, Ericameria
Schinia zuni McElvare, 1950			

== Unpublished species ==
- Schinia n. sp. nr. avemensis
