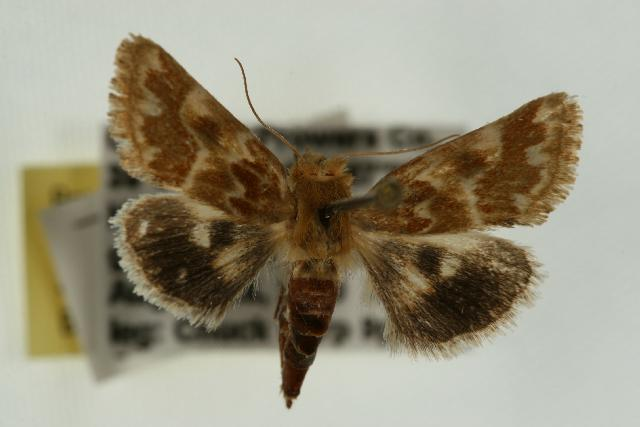

Scientific classification
- Domain: Eukaryota
- Kingdom: Animalia
- Phylum: Arthropoda
- Class: Insecta
- Order: Lepidoptera
- Superfamily: Noctuoidea
- Family: Noctuidae
- Genus: Schinia
- Species: S. bicuspida

Binomial name
- Schinia bicuspida Smith, 1891

= Schinia bicuspida =

Species of moth

Schinia bicuspida is a moth of the family Noctuidae. It is found in North America, including Arkansas, Arizona, Colorado, Kansas, Nebraska, New Mexico, Oklahoma, Texas and Utah.

The wingspan is about 23 mm.

The larvae feed on Isocoma drummondii and Machaeranthera annua.
