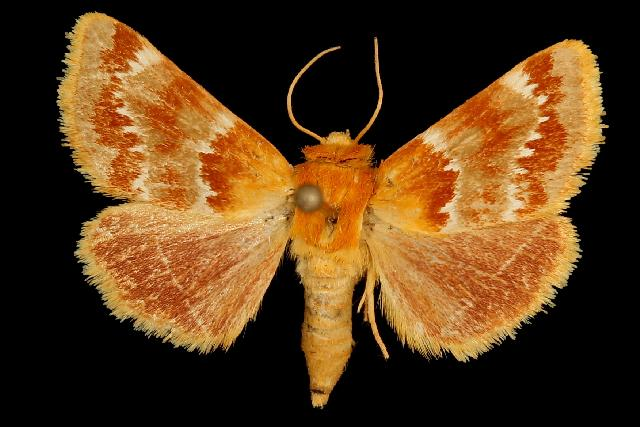

Scientific classification
- Kingdom: Animalia
- Phylum: Arthropoda
- Clade: Pancrustacea
- Class: Insecta
- Order: Lepidoptera
- Superfamily: Noctuoidea
- Family: Noctuidae
- Genus: Schinia
- Species: S. fulleri

Binomial name
- Schinia fulleri McElvare, 1961

= Schinia fulleri =

Species of moth

Schinia fulleri, or Fuller's flower moth, is a moth of the family Noctuidae.The species was first described by Rowland Robbins McElvare in 1961. It is endemic to central Florida in the United States.

The wingspan is about 23 mm. There is one generation per year.

The larvae feed on Balduina angustifolia.
