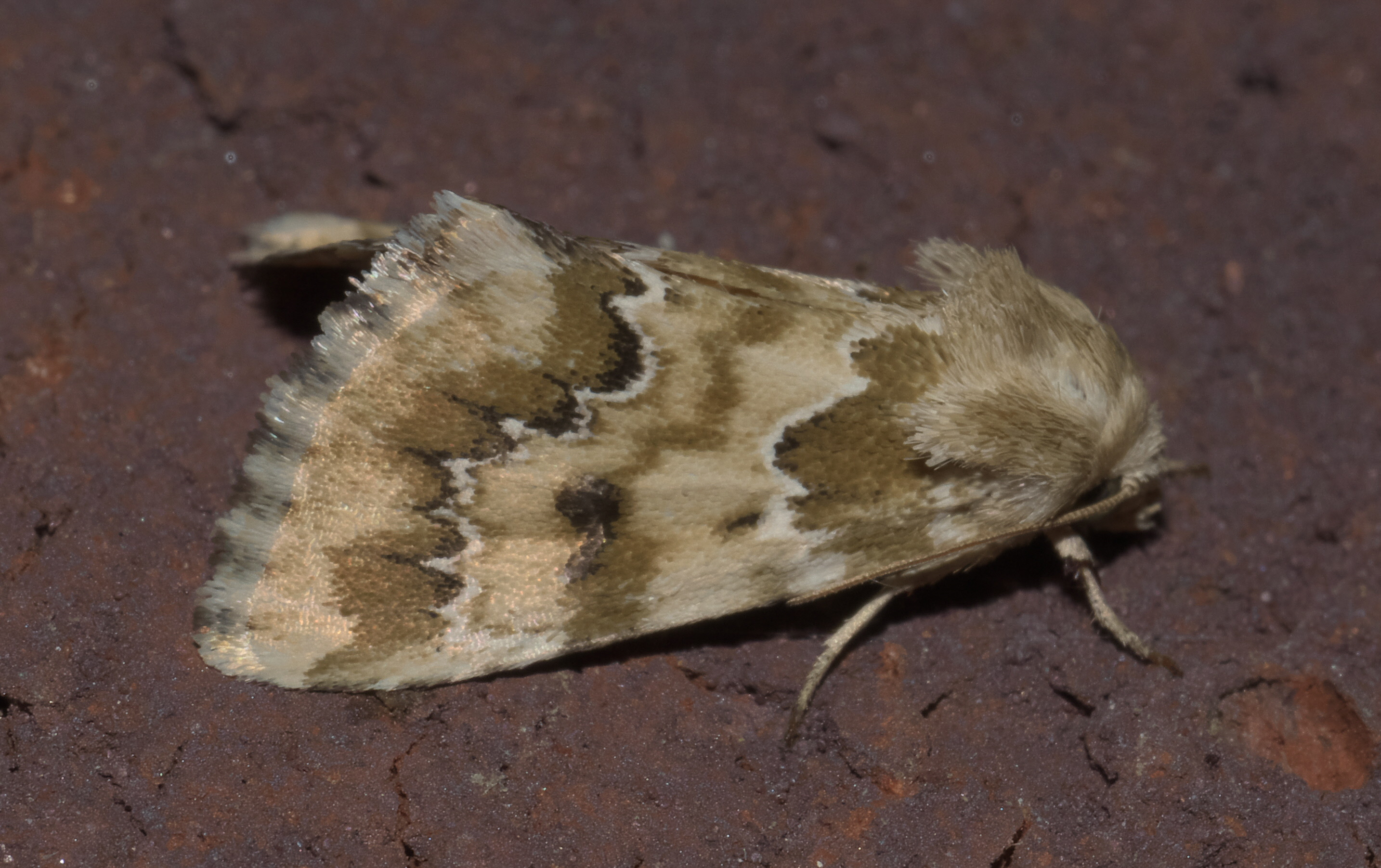

Scientific classification
- Domain: Eukaryota
- Kingdom: Animalia
- Phylum: Arthropoda
- Class: Insecta
- Order: Lepidoptera
- Superfamily: Noctuoidea
- Family: Noctuidae
- Genus: Schinia
- Species: S. crenilinea

Binomial name
- Schinia crenilinea Smith, 1891

= Schinia crenilinea =

Species of moth

Schinia crenilinea, the creniline flower moth, is a moth of the family Noctuidae. It is found in Arkansas, Oklahoma and Texas.

The wingspan is about 24 mm. Adults are on wing in late spring and summer.
