= Schinia maculata =

Scientific classification
- Domain: Eukaryota
- Kingdom: Animalia
- Phylum: Arthropoda
- Class: Insecta
- Order: Lepidoptera
- Superfamily: Noctuoidea
- Family: Noctuidae
- Genus: Schinia
- Species: S. maculata

Binomial name
- Schinia maculata Pogue, 2004

Synonyms
- Schinia blanca

Species of moth

Schinia maculata is a moth of the family Noctuidae. It is only known from south-eastern Texas.

The length of the fore wings is 13-13,8 mm for males and 13–15 mm for females. Adults are on wing in mid October.
