= Schinia dobla =

Scientific classification
- Domain: Eukaryota
- Kingdom: Animalia
- Phylum: Arthropoda
- Class: Insecta
- Order: Lepidoptera
- Superfamily: Noctuoidea
- Family: Noctuidae
- Genus: Schinia
- Species: S. dobla

Binomial name
- Schinia dobla Smith, 1906

Species of moth

Schinia dobla is a moth of the family Noctuidae. It is found in North America, including Arizona, California and Nevada.

The larvae feed on Ambriosia dumosa.
