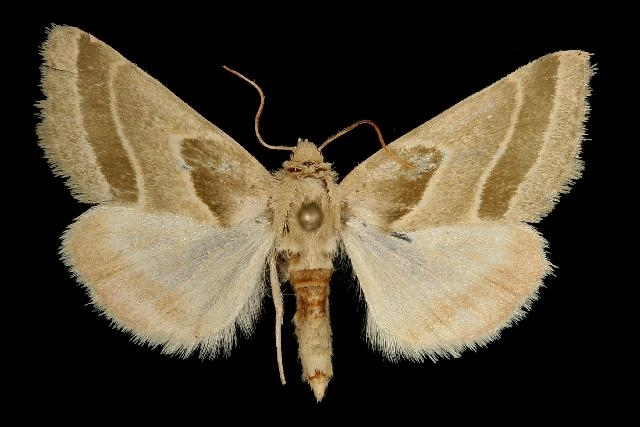
- Adult
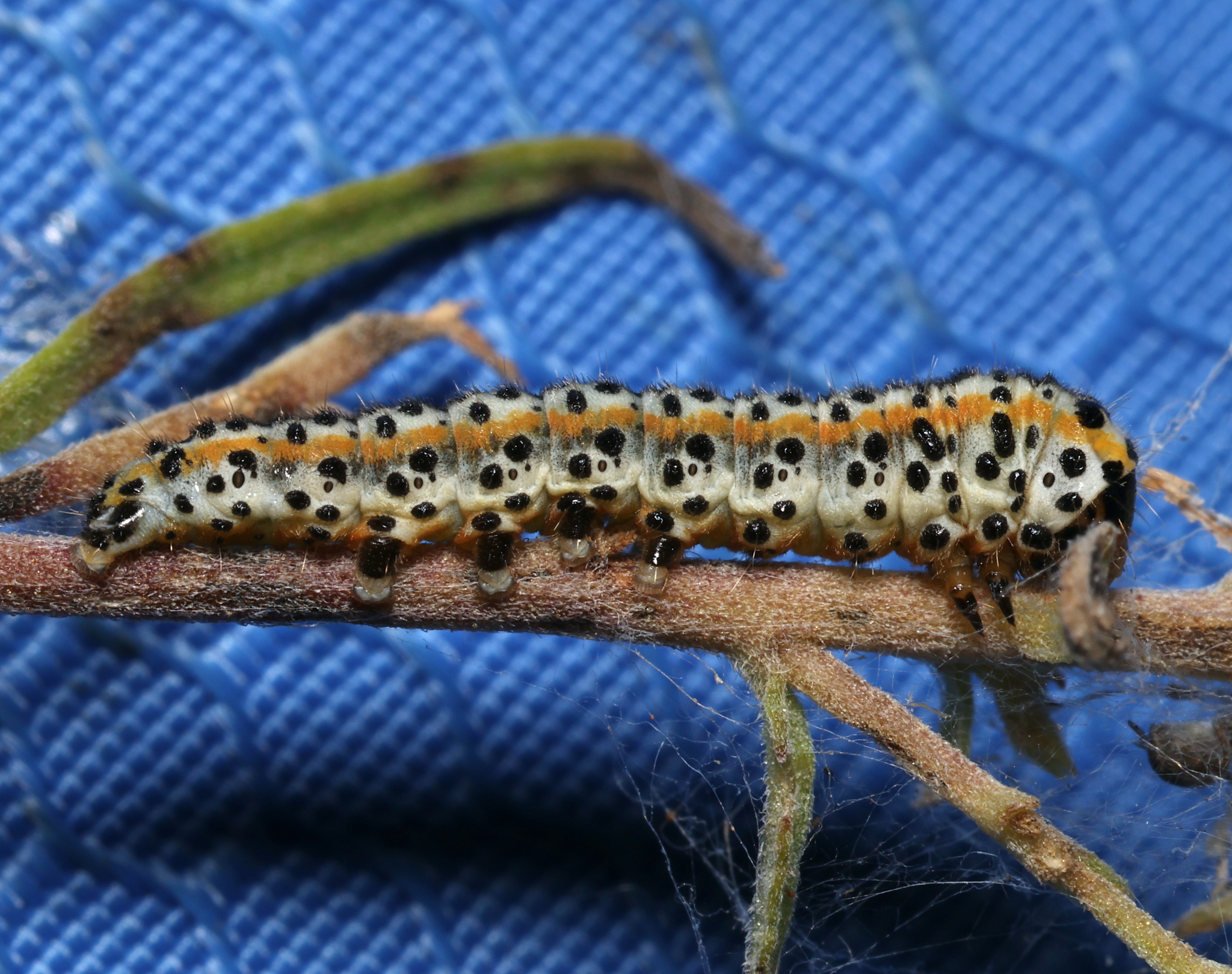
- Larva on Brickellia eupatorioides

Scientific classification
- Kingdom: Animalia
- Phylum: Arthropoda
- Class: Insecta
- Order: Lepidoptera
- Superfamily: Noctuoidea
- Family: Noctuidae
- Genus: Schinia
- Species: S. grandimedia

Binomial name
- Schinia grandimedia Hardwick, 1996

= Schinia grandimedia =

Species of moth

Schinia grandimedia, the Rockies boneset flower moth, is a moth of the family Noctuidae. The species was first described by David F. Hardwick in 1996. It is found in the United States from Kansas to Texas, west to Colorado and New Mexico.

The wingspan is 26–27 mm. There is one generation per year.

Larvae have been recorded on Brickellia eupatorioides var. corymbulosa and var. chlorolepis.
