= Schinia carminatra =

Scientific classification
- Kingdom: Animalia
- Phylum: Arthropoda
- Class: Insecta
- Order: Lepidoptera
- Superfamily: Noctuoidea
- Family: Noctuidae
- Genus: Schinia
- Species: S. carminatra

Binomial name
- Schinia carminatra Smith, 1903

Species of moth

Schinia carminatra is a moth of the family Noctuidae. It is found in Colorado and Oklahoma.

The wingspan is about 10 mm.
