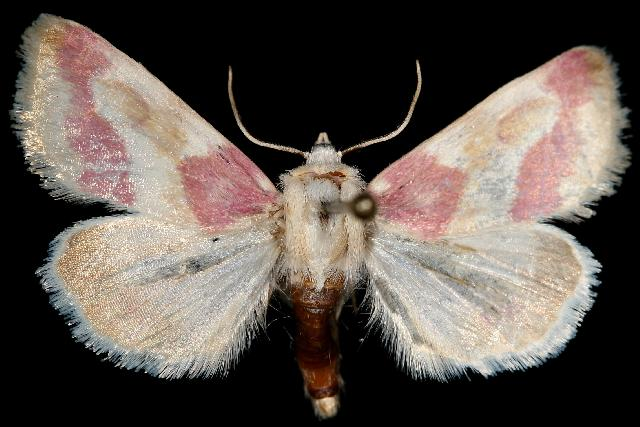

Scientific classification
- Domain: Eukaryota
- Kingdom: Animalia
- Phylum: Arthropoda
- Class: Insecta
- Order: Lepidoptera
- Superfamily: Noctuoidea
- Family: Noctuidae
- Genus: Schinia
- Species: S. regina

Binomial name
- Schinia regina Pogue & Harp, 2003

= Schinia regina =

Species of moth

Schinia regina, the reginia primrose moth, is a moth of the family Noctuidae. It is found from southern and western Texas, north to the panhandle, north-western Oklahoma, Kansas, Nebraska and west to southern New Mexico and eastern Colorado.

The wingspan is 26–30 mm. Adults are on wing from August to September.

The larvae feed on Palafoxia sphacelata.
