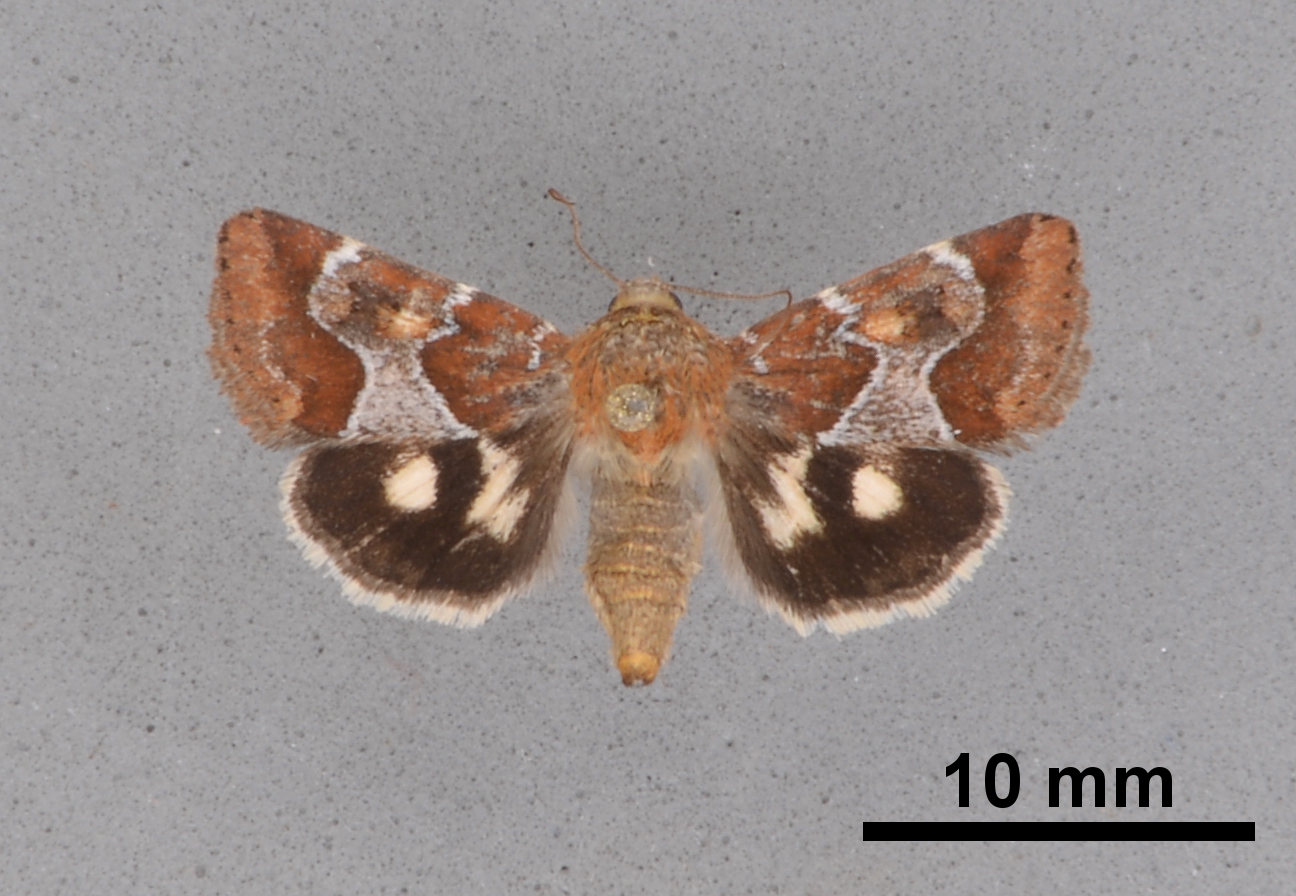

Scientific classification
- Kingdom: Animalia
- Phylum: Arthropoda
- Class: Insecta
- Order: Lepidoptera
- Superfamily: Noctuoidea
- Family: Noctuidae
- Genus: Schinia
- Species: S. subspinosae

Binomial name
- Schinia subspinosae Hardwick, 1996

= Schinia subspinosae =

Species of moth

Schinia subspinosae is a moth of the family Noctuidae. It is in North America, including and possibly limited to Florida.
