= Schinia imperialis =

Scientific classification
- Kingdom: Animalia
- Phylum: Arthropoda
- Class: Insecta
- Order: Lepidoptera
- Superfamily: Noctuoidea
- Family: Noctuidae
- Genus: Schinia
- Species: S. imperialis

Binomial name
- Schinia imperialis (Staudinger, 1871)

Species of moth

Schinia imperialis is a moth of the family Noctuidae. It is found in Daghestan and Turkey.

The larvae feed on Cephalaria procera.
