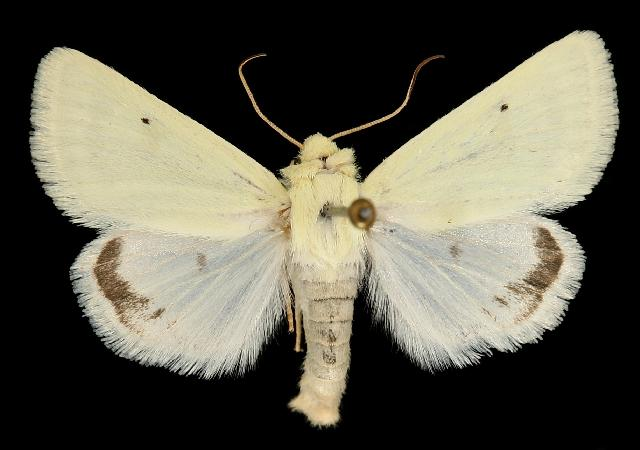

Scientific classification
- Kingdom: Animalia
- Phylum: Arthropoda
- Class: Insecta
- Order: Lepidoptera
- Superfamily: Noctuoidea
- Family: Noctuidae
- Genus: Schinia
- Species: S. citrinella

Binomial name
- Schinia citrinella Grote & Robinson, 1870

= Schinia citrinella =

Species of moth

Schinia citrinella is a moth of the family Noctuidae. It is found in North America, including Arizona, California, Colorado, Kansas, Nebraska, Nevada, New Mexico, Oklahoma, Texas, Utah and northern Mexico.

The wingspan is about 26 mm.

The larvae feed on Croton species.
