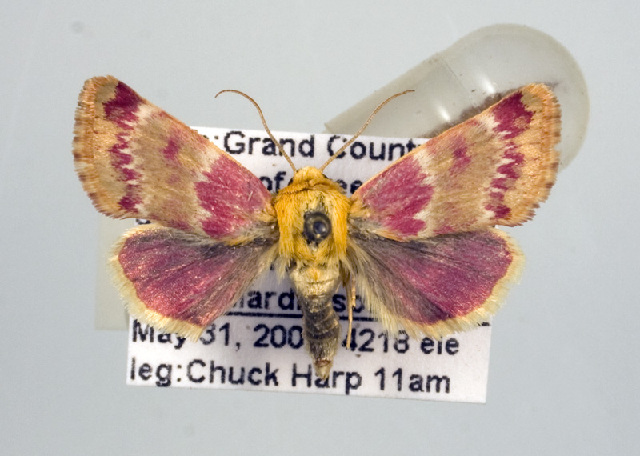

Scientific classification
- Kingdom: Animalia
- Phylum: Arthropoda
- Class: Insecta
- Order: Lepidoptera
- Superfamily: Noctuoidea
- Family: Noctuidae
- Genus: Schinia
- Species: S. sanrafaeli

Binomial name
- Schinia sanrafaeli Opler, 2004

= Schinia sanrafaeli =

Species of moth

Schinia sanrafaeli is a moth of the family Noctuidae. It is found in North America, including Utah and western New Mexico.

The wingspan is 20–21 mm.
