= Schinia brunnea =

Scientific classification
- Kingdom: Animalia
- Phylum: Arthropoda
- Class: Insecta
- Order: Lepidoptera
- Superfamily: Noctuoidea
- Family: Noctuidae
- Genus: Schinia
- Species: S. brunnea

Binomial name
- Schinia brunnea Barnes & McDunnough, 1913

Species of moth

Schinia brunnea is a moth of the family Noctuidae first described by William Barnes and James Halliday McDunnough in 1913. It is found in the desert areas west of the Peninsular Ranges and south of the Transverse Ranges of southern California in the US.

Adults are on wing from late summer to early fall.
