= Schinia hardwickorum =

Scientific classification
- Kingdom: Animalia
- Phylum: Arthropoda
- Class: Insecta
- Order: Lepidoptera
- Superfamily: Noctuoidea
- Family: Noctuidae
- Genus: Schinia
- Species: S. hardwickorum

Binomial name
- Schinia hardwickorum Opler 2000

Species of moth

Schinia hardwickorum is a moth of the family Noctuidae. It is found in North America.
