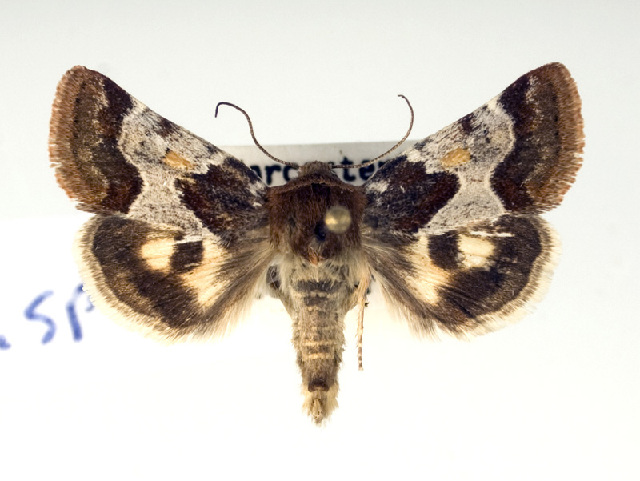

Scientific classification
- Kingdom: Animalia
- Phylum: Arthropoda
- Class: Insecta
- Order: Lepidoptera
- Superfamily: Noctuoidea
- Family: Noctuidae
- Genus: Schinia
- Species: S. spinosae

Binomial name
- Schinia spinosae Guenée, 1852

Synonyms
- Schinia hirtella (Grote & Robinson, 1866); Schinia camina (Smith, 1906); Eupanychis spinosae

= Schinia spinosae =

Species of moth

The spinose flower moth (Schinia spinosae) is a moth of the family Noctuidae. It is found in North America, including New York and Maryland.

The wingspan is about 22–24 mm.

It uses Polygonella as a host plant, and seems to use Polygonella articulata across much of its northern range.
