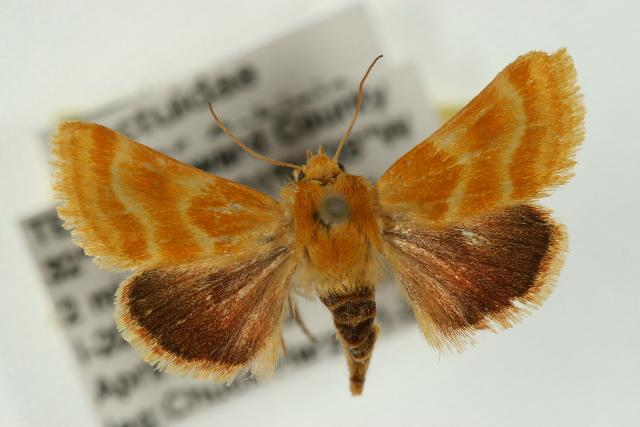

Scientific classification
- Kingdom: Animalia
- Phylum: Arthropoda
- Class: Insecta
- Order: Lepidoptera
- Superfamily: Noctuoidea
- Family: Noctuidae
- Genus: Schinia
- Species: S. biforma

Binomial name
- Schinia biforma Smith, 1906

= Schinia biforma =

Species of moth

Schinia biforma is a moth of the family Noctuidae. It is found in North America, including the states of Colorado, New Mexico, Oklahoma and Texas.

The wingspan is about 21 mm.

The larvae feed on Amblyolepis setigera.
