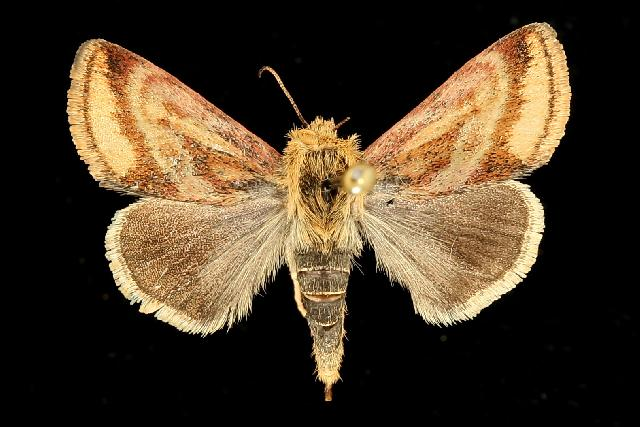

Scientific classification
- Kingdom: Animalia
- Phylum: Arthropoda
- Class: Insecta
- Order: Lepidoptera
- Superfamily: Noctuoidea
- Family: Noctuidae
- Genus: Schinia
- Species: S. mitis

Binomial name
- Schinia mitis Grote, 1873

Synonyms
- Schinia obliquata (Smith, 1891)

= Schinia mitis =

Species of moth

Schinia mitis, the matutinal flower moth, is a moth of the family Noctuidae. It is found from central Florida, north to Georgia and west to eastern Texas.

Adults are on wing from April to June, but there are also records from September and November. It is a day flying moth, which is only active for a few hours in the morning, when the flowers of its host plant are open.

The larvae feed on Pyrrhopappus species.
