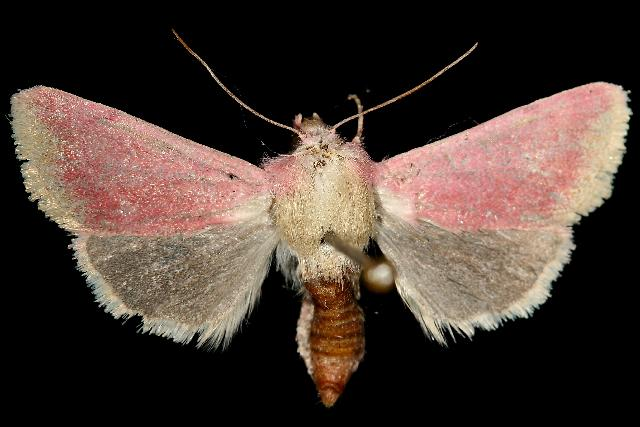

Scientific classification
- Domain: Eukaryota
- Kingdom: Animalia
- Phylum: Arthropoda
- Class: Insecta
- Order: Lepidoptera
- Superfamily: Noctuoidea
- Family: Noctuidae
- Genus: Schinia
- Species: S. lynda

Binomial name
- Schinia lynda Troubridge, 2002

= Schinia lynda =

Species of moth

Schinia lynda is a moth of the family Noctuidae. It is only known from the dunes in the high desert of south-central Oregon.

The wingspan is about 25 mm. Adults are nocturnal and are on wing from May to June.

The larvae probably feed on Oenothera deltoides var. piperi.
