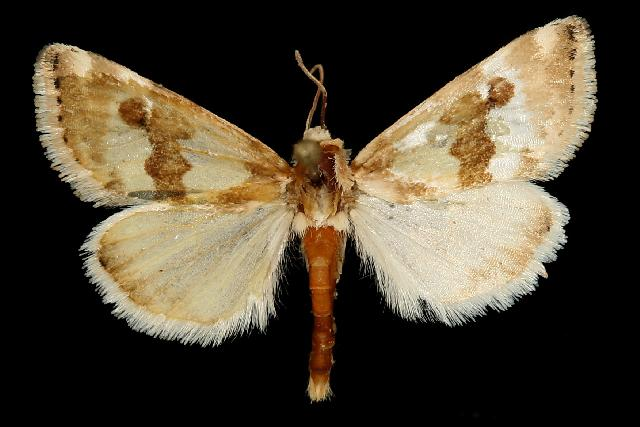

Scientific classification
- Kingdom: Animalia
- Phylum: Arthropoda
- Class: Insecta
- Order: Lepidoptera
- Superfamily: Noctuoidea
- Family: Noctuidae
- Genus: Schinia
- Species: S. alencis

Binomial name
- Schinia alencis Harvey, 1875

Synonyms
- Tricopis alencis Harvey 1875; Tricopis aleucis; Schinia aleucis

= Schinia alencis =

Species of moth

Schinia alencis is a moth of the family Noctuidae. It is found from south-eastern Colorado to south-eastern Arizona east to western Oklahoma, northern Texas to south-western and south-eastern Texas.

The wingspan is 22–23 mm.

The larvae probably feed on Heterotheca canescens.
