= Schinia carolinensis =

Scientific classification
- Domain: Eukaryota
- Kingdom: Animalia
- Phylum: Arthropoda
- Class: Insecta
- Order: Lepidoptera
- Superfamily: Noctuoidea
- Family: Noctuidae
- Genus: Schinia
- Species: S. carolinensis

Binomial name
- Schinia carolinensis Barnes & McDunnough, 1911

Species of moth

Schinia carolinensis is a moth of the family Noctuidae first described by William Barnes and James Halliday McDunnough in 1911. It is found in the United States from eastern North Carolina to the Florida peninsula and probably along the Gulf Coast.

Adults are on wing in late summer.
