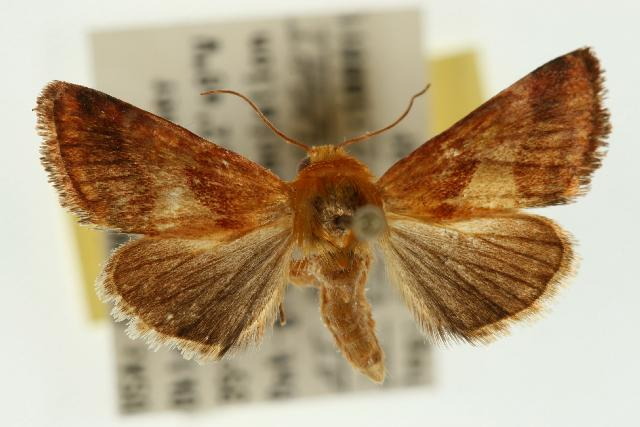

Scientific classification
- Kingdom: Animalia
- Phylum: Arthropoda
- Class: Insecta
- Order: Lepidoptera
- Superfamily: Noctuoidea
- Family: Noctuidae
- Genus: Schinia
- Species: S. varix

Binomial name
- Schinia varix Knudson, Bordelon & Pogue, 2003

= Schinia varix =

Species of moth

Schinia varix is a species of moth belonging to the family Noctuidae. It is found in eastern Texas, central Oklahoma and Louisiana.

== Description ==
This moth has a forewing length of 8.6–10.2 millimetres (0.34–0.40 in). In the male the forewings are yellow with dark purple bands in the basal and subterminal areas and the hindwings are generally black with yellow fringes. The female is similar but with generally darker forewings. This species flies at night from August to early October.

== Ecology ==
The breeding biology of this species is unknown and larvae have never been found but its habitat and distribution suggest the larval food plant is probably some species of Gaillardia.

== History ==
It was first collected in 1944 in eastern Texas where it was feeding on various pines since it inhabited mostly pine forests. The later discoveries were made in Louisiana where it fed on gallberry and Oklahoma where the main food was oak and hickory. However, it wasn't described till 2003.
