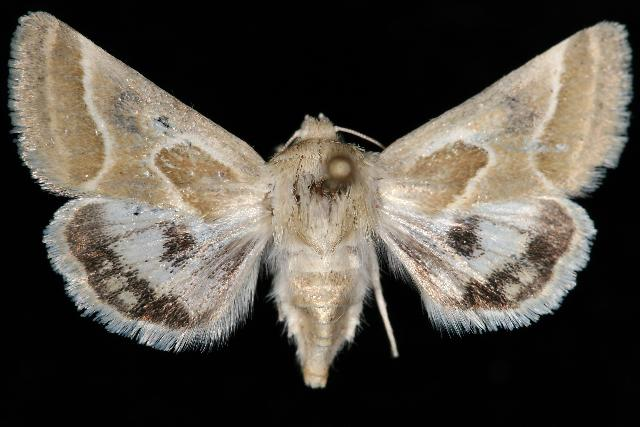

Scientific classification
- Domain: Eukaryota
- Kingdom: Animalia
- Phylum: Arthropoda
- Class: Insecta
- Order: Lepidoptera
- Superfamily: Noctuoidea
- Family: Noctuidae
- Genus: Schinia
- Species: S. intrabilis

Binomial name
- Schinia intrabilis Smith, 1893

= Schinia intrabilis =

Species of moth

Schinia intrabilis is a moth of the family Noctuidae. It is found in North America, including California, Arizona, Nevada, Texas and Utah.

The wingspan is about 23 mm. Adults are on wing from March to April. There is one generation per year.

The larvae feed on Pluchea sericea.
