= Schinia persimilis =

Scientific classification
- Domain: Eukaryota
- Kingdom: Animalia
- Phylum: Arthropoda
- Class: Insecta
- Order: Lepidoptera
- Superfamily: Noctuoidea
- Family: Noctuidae
- Genus: Schinia
- Species: S. persimilis

Binomial name
- Schinia persimilis Grote, 1873

Species of moth

Schinia persimilis, the persimilis flower moth, is a moth of the family Noctuidae. The species was first described by Augustus Radcliffe Grote in 1873. It is found from in western North America from east central Alberta and the Cypress Hills in Saskatchewan north to the southern Yukon, west and south to Colorado, Utah, California and Oregon.

The wingspan is 22–23 mm. Adults are on wing from June to August depending on the location.
