= Schinia mcfarlandi =

Scientific classification
- Kingdom: Animalia
- Phylum: Arthropoda
- Class: Insecta
- Order: Lepidoptera
- Superfamily: Noctuoidea
- Family: Noctuidae
- Genus: Schinia
- Species: S. mcfarlandi

Binomial name
- Schinia mcfarlandi Opler, 2000

Species of moth

Schinia mcfarlandi is a moth of the family Noctuidae. It is found in North America.
