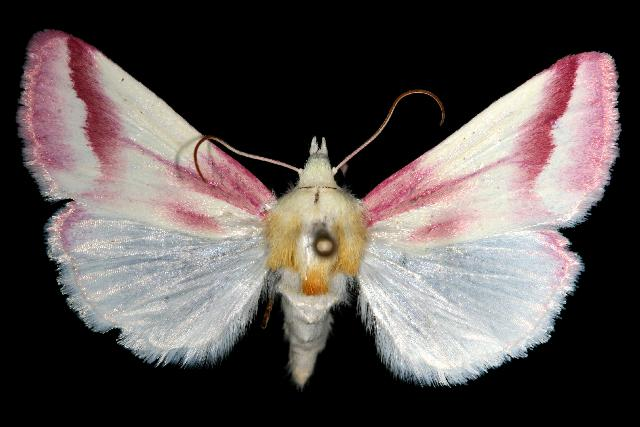

Scientific classification
- Domain: Eukaryota
- Kingdom: Animalia
- Phylum: Arthropoda
- Class: Insecta
- Order: Lepidoptera
- Superfamily: Noctuoidea
- Family: Noctuidae
- Genus: Schinia
- Species: S. gaurae

Binomial name
- Schinia gaurae J. E. Smith, 1797

= Schinia gaurae =

Species of moth

Schinia gaurae, the clouded crimson, is a moth of the family Noctuidae. The species was first described by James Edward Smith in 1797. It is found in North America from Illinois west across southern Saskatchewan and Alberta, south to Florida, Texas, Arizona and south into Mexico.

The wingspan is 30–32 mm. Adults are on wing from June to August depending on the location. There is one generation in the north and two generations in Missouri.

The larvae feed on Gaura species.
