= Schinia rufipenna =

Scientific classification
- Domain: Eukaryota
- Kingdom: Animalia
- Phylum: Arthropoda
- Class: Insecta
- Order: Lepidoptera
- Superfamily: Noctuoidea
- Family: Noctuidae
- Genus: Schinia
- Species: S. rufipenna

Binomial name
- Schinia rufipenna Hardwick, 1983

Species of moth

Schinia rufipenna is a moth of the family Noctuidae. Only a few populations are known, mainly in Florida, but there is also one record for Louisiana.

Adults are on wing in November.

The larvae feed on the flowers and developing seeds of Pityopsis graminifolia.
