= Schinia purpurascens =

Scientific classification
- Kingdom: Animalia
- Phylum: Arthropoda
- Class: Insecta
- Order: Lepidoptera
- Superfamily: Noctuoidea
- Family: Noctuidae
- Genus: Schinia
- Species: S. purpurascens

Binomial name
- Schinia purpurascens (Tauscher, 1809)

Synonyms
- Noctua purpurascens Tauscher, 1809; Heliothis pulchra Eversmann, 1842; Purpurschinia purpurascens (Tauscher, 1809)

Species of moth

Schinia purpurascens is a moth of the family Noctuidae. It is found in Russia and Turkey.
