= Schinia felicitata =

Scientific classification
- Domain: Eukaryota
- Kingdom: Animalia
- Phylum: Arthropoda
- Class: Insecta
- Order: Lepidoptera
- Superfamily: Noctuoidea
- Family: Noctuidae
- Genus: Schinia
- Species: S. felicitata

Binomial name
- Schinia felicitata Smith, 1894

Synonyms
- Schinia imperialis Barnes & McDunnough, 1911 (Preocc.)

Species of moth

Schinia felicitata is a moth of the family Noctuidae. It is found from northern Mexico, north to southern California and southwest Utah.

The wingspan is 27–28 mm.

The larvae feed on Oenothera deltoides.
