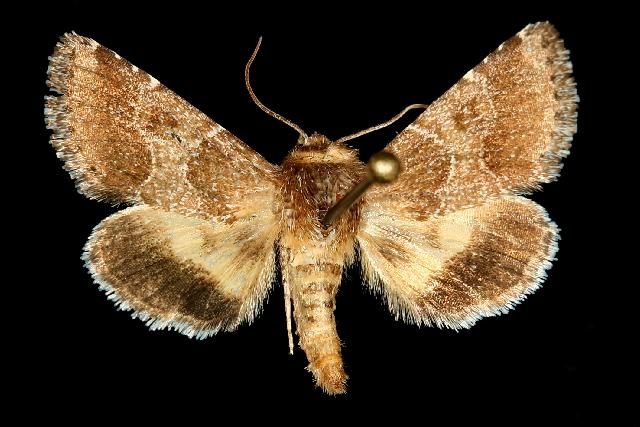

Scientific classification
- Domain: Eukaryota
- Kingdom: Animalia
- Phylum: Arthropoda
- Class: Insecta
- Order: Lepidoptera
- Superfamily: Noctuoidea
- Family: Noctuidae
- Genus: Schinia
- Species: S. ultima

Binomial name
- Schinia ultima Strecker, 1876

= Schinia ultima =

Species of moth

Schinia ultima is a moth of the family Noctuidae. It is found in North America, including Colorado, Kansas, Nebraska, Oklahoma, Missouri and Texas.

The wingspan is about 23 mm.
