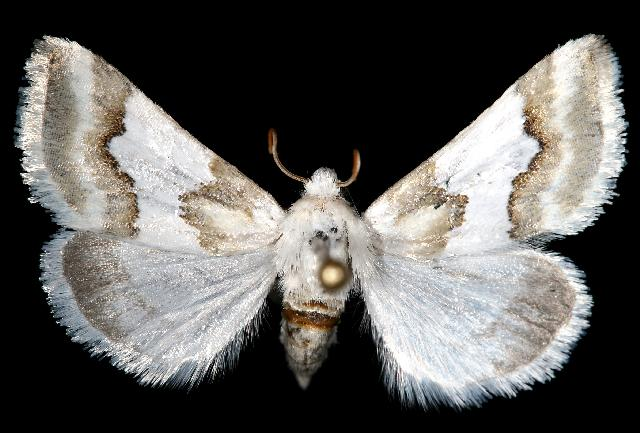

Scientific classification
- Domain: Eukaryota
- Kingdom: Animalia
- Phylum: Arthropoda
- Class: Insecta
- Order: Lepidoptera
- Superfamily: Noctuoidea
- Family: Noctuidae
- Genus: Schinia
- Species: S. hulstia

Binomial name
- Schinia hulstia Tepper, 1883

Synonyms
- Schinia tenuescens

= Schinia hulstia =

Species of moth

Schinia hulstia, or Hulst's flower moth, is a moth of the family Noctuidae. The species was first described by Tepper in 1883. It is found on US the Great Plains from North Dakota to Texas, in the south ranging eastward to Arkansas and westward to California.

The wingspan is about 24 mm.

== Etymology ==
The specific name is described by John Bernhardt Smith as being chosen in honor of George Duryea Hulst, "a good entomologist and a well known authority on the Catocalinae."
