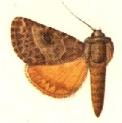

Scientific classification
- Kingdom: Animalia
- Phylum: Arthropoda
- Class: Insecta
- Order: Lepidoptera
- Superfamily: Noctuoidea
- Family: Noctuidae
- Genus: Schinia
- Species: S. mexicana

Binomial name
- Schinia mexicana Hampson, 1903

Synonyms
- Adonisea mexicana; Eupanychis mexicana

= Schinia mexicana =

Species of moth

Schinia mexicana is a moth of the family Noctuidae. It is found in Mexico and Southern Arizona.
