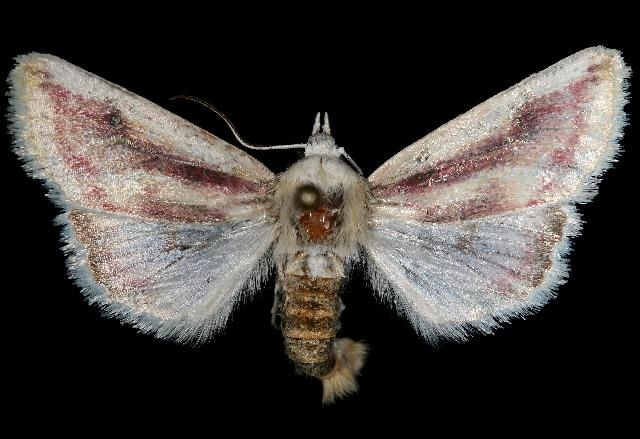

Scientific classification
- Domain: Eukaryota
- Kingdom: Animalia
- Phylum: Arthropoda
- Class: Insecta
- Order: Lepidoptera
- Superfamily: Noctuoidea
- Family: Noctuidae
- Genus: Schinia
- Species: S. niveicosta

Binomial name
- Schinia niveicosta Smith, 1906

Synonyms
- Heliothis niveicosta Smith, 1906; Schinia melliflua Dyar, 1921

= Schinia niveicosta =

Species of moth

Schinia niveicosta is a moth of the family Noctuidae. It is found from south-western Utah and western and south-eastern Arizona, west to southern California and southern Nevada.

Most adults are recorded in March and April, but there are also records for May, September to November and January to February.

The larvae feed on Palafoxia linearis.
