= Schinia amaryllis =

Scientific classification
- Domain: Eukaryota
- Kingdom: Animalia
- Phylum: Arthropoda
- Class: Insecta
- Order: Lepidoptera
- Superfamily: Noctuoidea
- Family: Noctuidae
- Genus: Schinia
- Species: S. amaryllis

Binomial name
- Schinia amaryllis Smith, 1891

Synonyms
- Heliophana amaryllis

Species of moth

Schinia amaryllis is a moth of the family Noctuidae. It is found in South-Western North America, including California.

The wingspan is about 19 mm.

The larvae feed on Ambrosia species.
