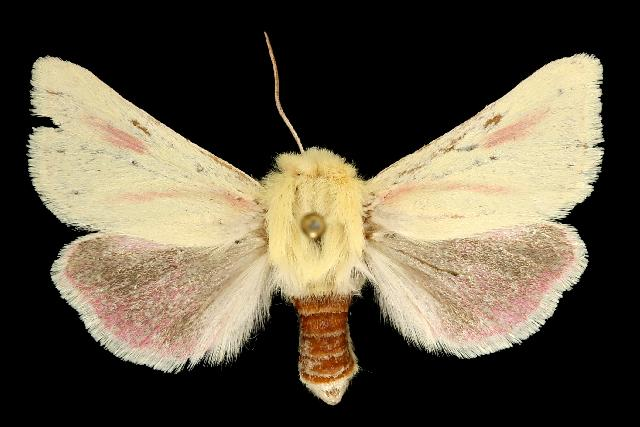

Scientific classification
- Kingdom: Animalia
- Phylum: Arthropoda
- Class: Insecta
- Order: Lepidoptera
- Superfamily: Noctuoidea
- Family: Noctuidae
- Genus: Schinia
- Species: S. snowi

Binomial name
- Schinia snowi (Grote, 1875)

Synonyms
- Thyreion rosea (Smith, 1891); Schinia rosea Smith, 1891; Thyreion snowii (Grote, 1875); Schinia stena (Smith, 1906)

= Schinia snowi =

Species of moth

Schinia snowi is a moth of the family Noctuidae. It is found in North America, including Colorado, Texas, Kansas and Wyoming.

The wingspan is 22–26 mm.

Larvae have been recorded on Allium.
