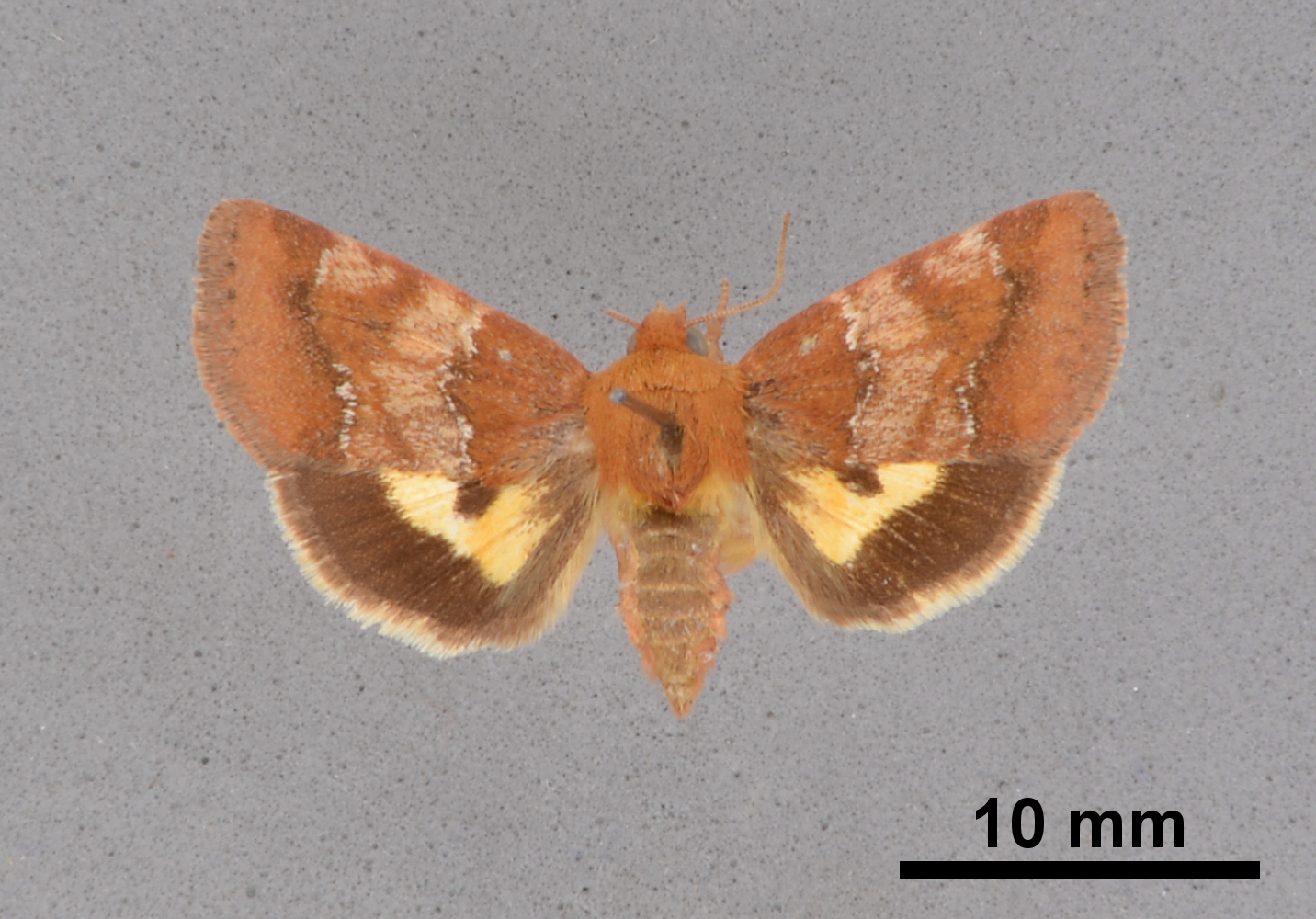

Scientific classification
- Domain: Eukaryota
- Kingdom: Animalia
- Phylum: Arthropoda
- Class: Insecta
- Order: Lepidoptera
- Superfamily: Noctuoidea
- Family: Noctuidae
- Genus: Schinia
- Species: S. scissoides

Binomial name
- Schinia scissoides Benjamin, 1936

= Schinia scissoides =

Species of moth

The divided flower moth (Schinia scissoides) is a species of moth in the family Noctuidae. It is found in North America, including the US states of North Carolina, South Carolina and Florida.

The wingspan is about 22 mm.
