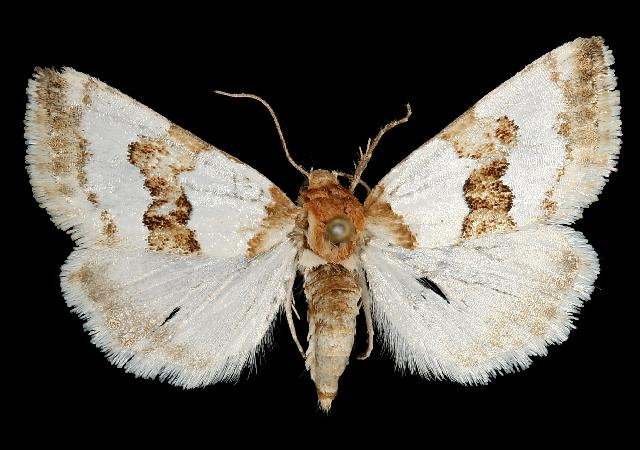

Scientific classification
- Domain: Eukaryota
- Kingdom: Animalia
- Phylum: Arthropoda
- Class: Insecta
- Order: Lepidoptera
- Superfamily: Noctuoidea
- Family: Noctuidae
- Genus: Schinia
- Species: S. chryselloides

Binomial name
- Schinia chryselloides Pogue & Harp, 2005

= Schinia chryselloides =

Species of moth

Schinia chryselloides is a moth of the family Noctuidae. It is found in Colorado from the base of the foothills in Jefferson County, east to Lincoln County, in extreme south-eastern Colorado, south to south-eastern Socorro County, New Mexico, and east to the south-eastern panhandle of Texas and extreme southern Texas.

The wingspan is about 21 mm. Adults are on wing from June to September.
