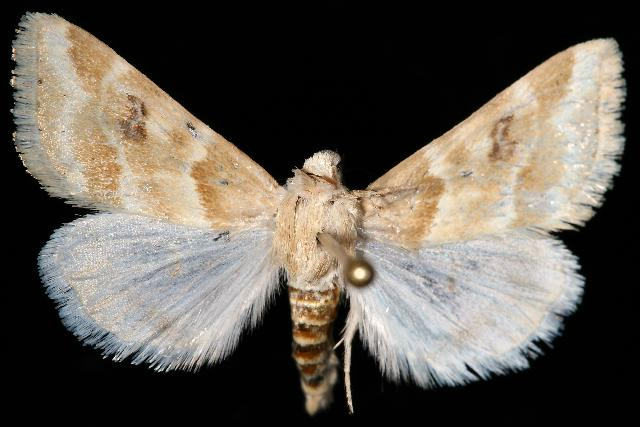

Scientific classification
- Domain: Eukaryota
- Kingdom: Animalia
- Phylum: Arthropoda
- Class: Insecta
- Order: Lepidoptera
- Superfamily: Noctuoidea
- Family: Noctuidae
- Genus: Schinia
- Species: S. obliqua

Binomial name
- Schinia obliqua Smith, 1883

= Schinia obliqua =

Species of moth

Schinia obliqua is a moth of the family Noctuidae. It is found in North America from California to Colorado and Western Texas. Adults of this species fly July through September.

Schinia unimacula was synonymized with Schinia obliqua in 1996 by Hardwick, but resurrected from synonymy in 2003 by Pogue and Harp.

The wingspan is about 23 mm.
