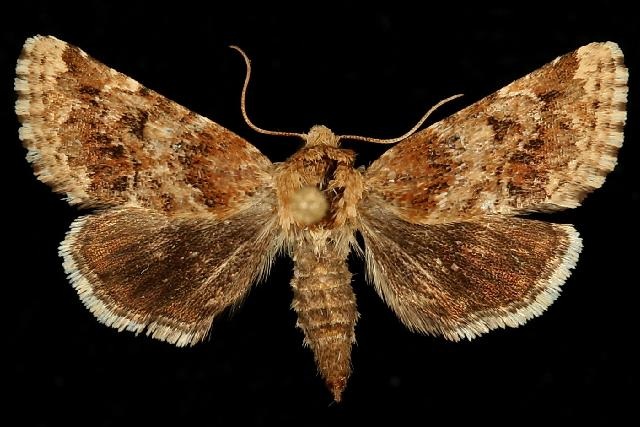

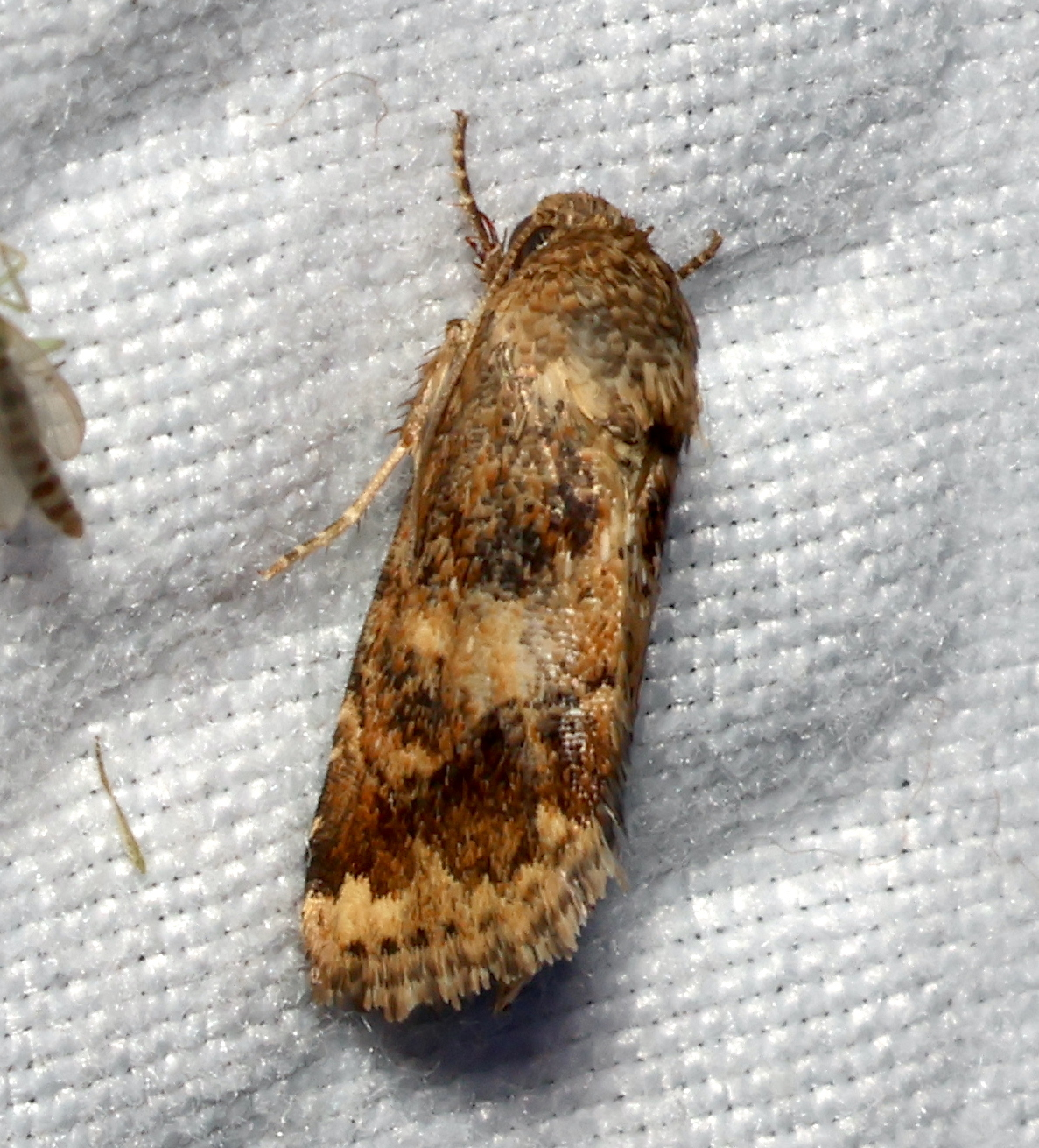

Scientific classification
- Kingdom: Animalia
- Phylum: Arthropoda
- Clade: Pancrustacea
- Class: Insecta
- Order: Lepidoptera
- Superfamily: Noctuoidea
- Family: Noctuidae
- Genus: Schinia
- Species: S. sordida

Binomial name
- Schinia sordida Smith, 1883

Synonyms
- Schinia approximata Strecker, 1898; Schinia ar Strecker, 1898; Schinia labe Strecker, 1898

= Schinia sordida =

Species of moth

Schinia sordida, the sordid flower moth or dingy schinia, is a moth of the family Noctuidae. The species was first described by John B. Smith in 1883. It is found in the United States from North Carolina to central Florida west to Kansas and Texas. It has also been recorded from Alabama.

The wingspan is 16–20 mm. There is one generation per year.

The larvae feed on Pityopsis pinifolia and Haplopappus divaricatus.

The body of Schinia sordida is typically reddish-brown, while the wings are chocolate brown with pale yellow markings near its tips and a pink tinge toward the center.
