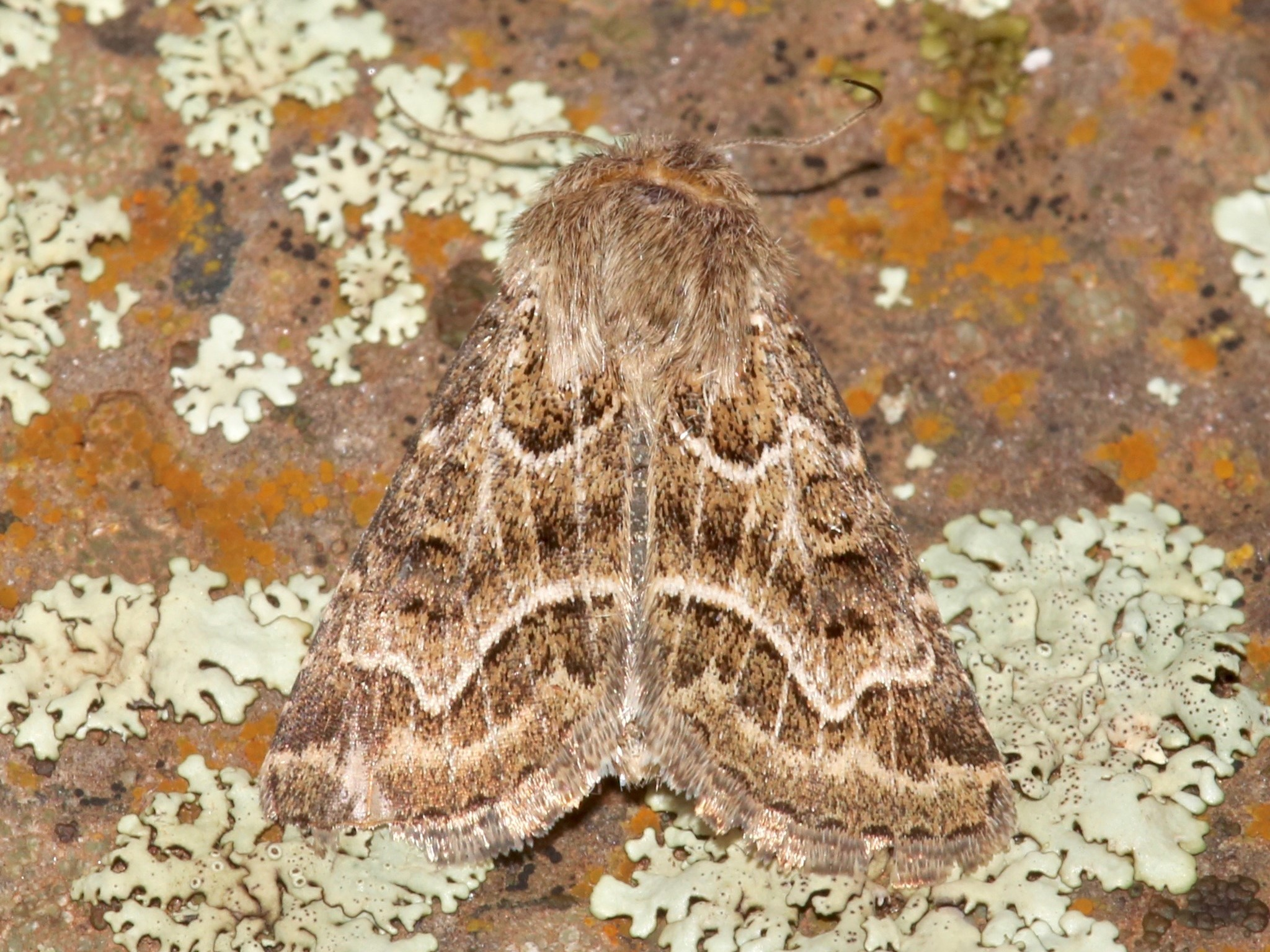

Scientific classification
- Domain: Eukaryota
- Kingdom: Animalia
- Phylum: Arthropoda
- Class: Insecta
- Order: Lepidoptera
- Superfamily: Noctuoidea
- Family: Noctuidae
- Genus: Schinia
- Species: S. angulilinea

Binomial name
- Schinia angulilinea Hardwick, 1996

Synonyms
- Schinia arizonensis Hardwick, 1996 (unavailable)

= Schinia angulilinea =

Species of moth

Schinia angulilinea is a moth of the family Noctuidae. It is found in eastern Arizona.

The length of the fore wings is 12–14 mm for males and 11-13 for females. Adults are on wing from June to September.
