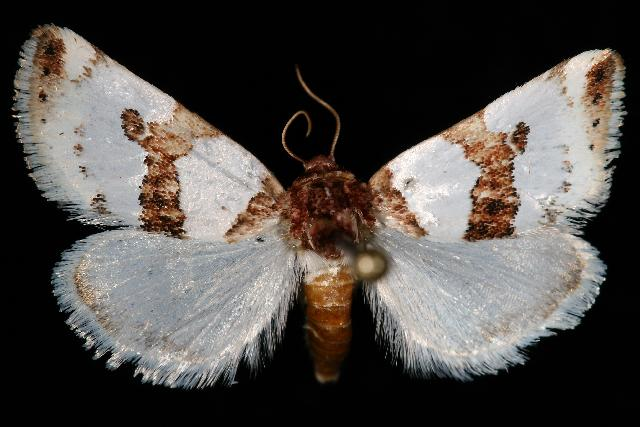

Scientific classification
- Domain: Eukaryota
- Kingdom: Animalia
- Phylum: Arthropoda
- Class: Insecta
- Order: Lepidoptera
- Superfamily: Noctuoidea
- Family: Noctuidae
- Genus: Schinia
- Species: S. ciliata

Binomial name
- Schinia ciliata Smith, 1900

= Schinia ciliata =

Species of moth

Schinia ciliata is a moth of the family Noctuidae. It is found from southern California east to Utah, Arizona, Colorado, New Mexico, western Kansas and Oklahoma, and scattered throughout Texas.

The wingspan is about 22 mm.

The larvae feed on Gutierrezia sarothrae.
