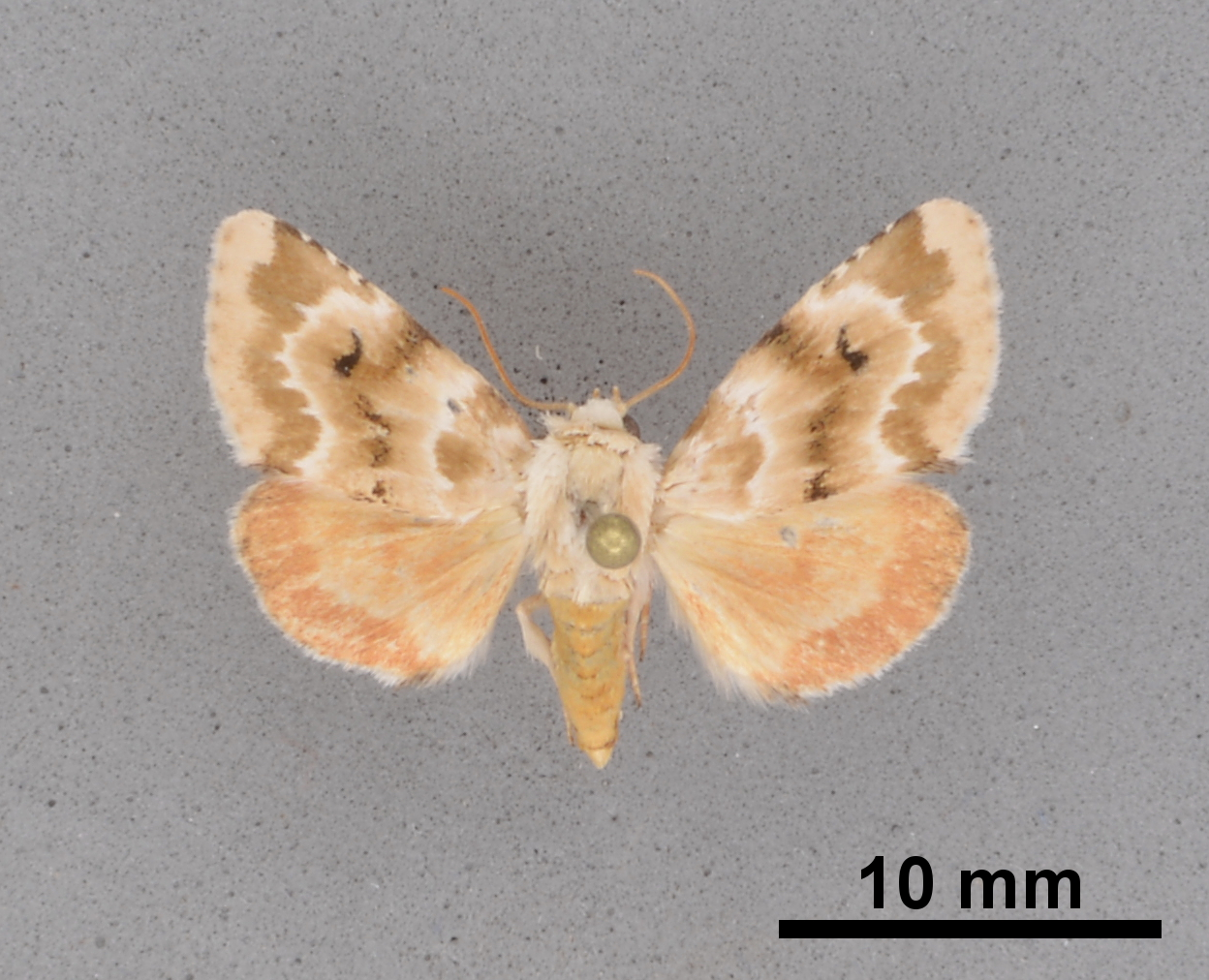

Scientific classification
- Domain: Eukaryota
- Kingdom: Animalia
- Phylum: Arthropoda
- Class: Insecta
- Order: Lepidoptera
- Superfamily: Noctuoidea
- Family: Noctuidae
- Genus: Schinia
- Species: S. arefacta

Binomial name
- Schinia arefacta H. Edwards, 1884

= Schinia arefacta =

Species of moth

Schinia arefacta, commonly known as the arefacta flower moth, is a moth of the family Noctuidae. It is endemic to Florida and Georgia.
