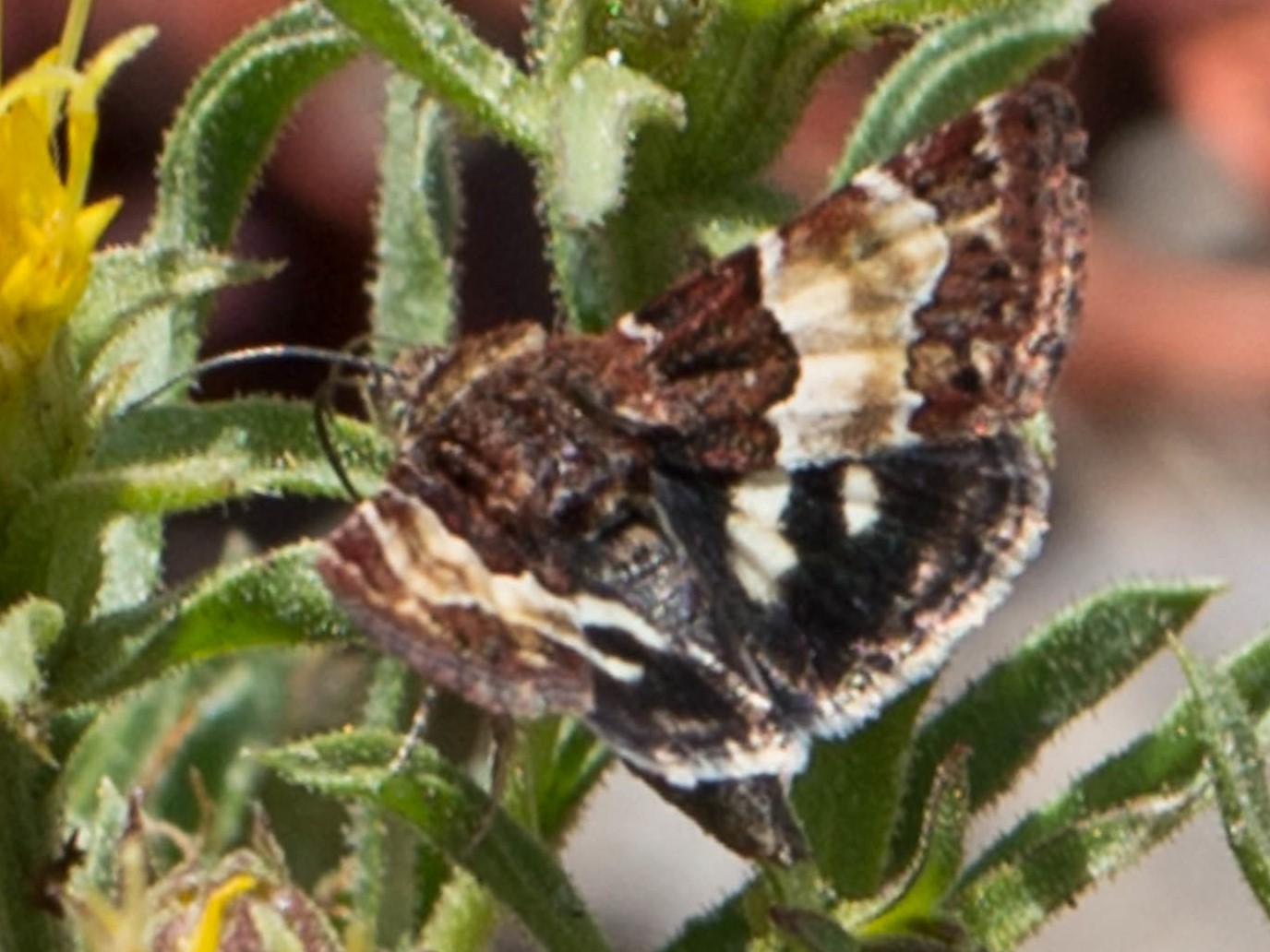

Scientific classification
- Domain: Eukaryota
- Kingdom: Animalia
- Phylum: Arthropoda
- Class: Insecta
- Order: Lepidoptera
- Superfamily: Noctuoidea
- Family: Noctuidae
- Genus: Schinia
- Species: S. vacciniae

Binomial name
- Schinia vacciniae H. Edwards, 1875

Synonyms
- Schinia vanella (Grote, 1879)

= Schinia vacciniae =

Species of moth

Schinia vacciniae is a moth of the family Noctuidae. It is found in North America, including the U.S. states of Arizona, California, Idaho, Oregon and Washington.

The wingspan is about 19 mm.
