= Schinia gabrielae =

Scientific classification
- Kingdom: Animalia
- Phylum: Arthropoda
- Class: Insecta
- Order: Lepidoptera
- Superfamily: Noctuoidea
- Family: Noctuidae
- Genus: Schinia
- Species: S. gabrielae

Binomial name
- Schinia gabrielae Badilla & Angulo, 1998

Species of moth

Schinia gabrielae is a moth of the family Noctuidae. It is found in Chile.
