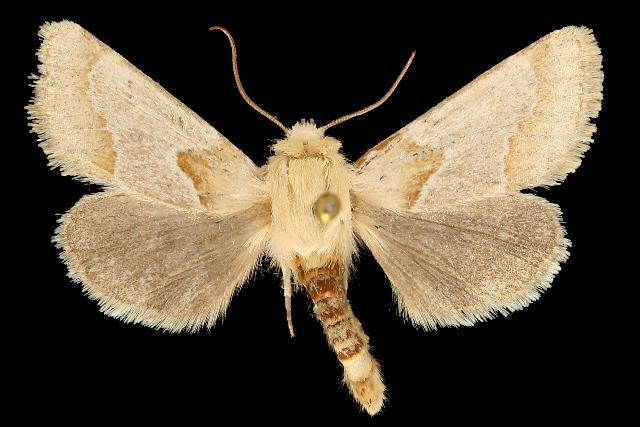

Scientific classification
- Domain: Eukaryota
- Kingdom: Animalia
- Phylum: Arthropoda
- Class: Insecta
- Order: Lepidoptera
- Superfamily: Noctuoidea
- Family: Noctuidae
- Genus: Schinia
- Species: S. ligeae

Binomial name
- Schinia ligeae Smith, 1893

= Schinia ligeae =

Species of moth

Schinia ligeae is a moth of the family Noctuidae. It is found in North America, including Arizona, California, Nevada and Utah.

The larvae feed on Machaeranthera canescens and Xylorhiza tortifolia.
