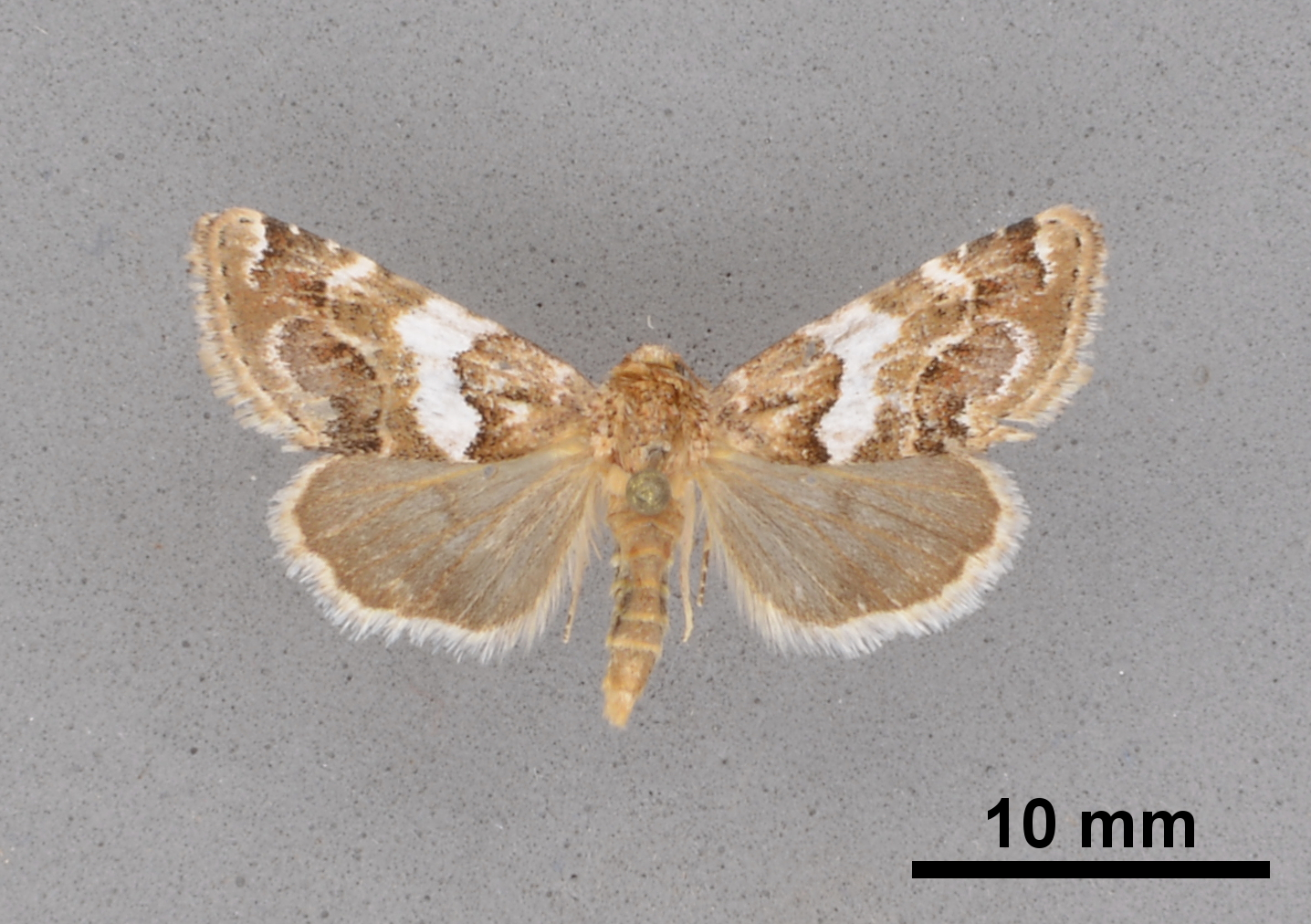

Scientific classification
- Domain: Eukaryota
- Kingdom: Animalia
- Phylum: Arthropoda
- Class: Insecta
- Order: Lepidoptera
- Superfamily: Noctuoidea
- Family: Noctuidae
- Genus: Schinia
- Species: S. argentifascia

Binomial name
- Schinia argentifascia Barnes & McDunnough, 1912

= Schinia argentifascia =

Species of moth

Schinia argentifascia is a moth of the family Noctuidae. It is found in North America, including Arizona, California, Baja California, Nevada, New Mexico, Texas and Utah.

The wingspan is about 24 mm.

The larvae feed on Ericameria species.
