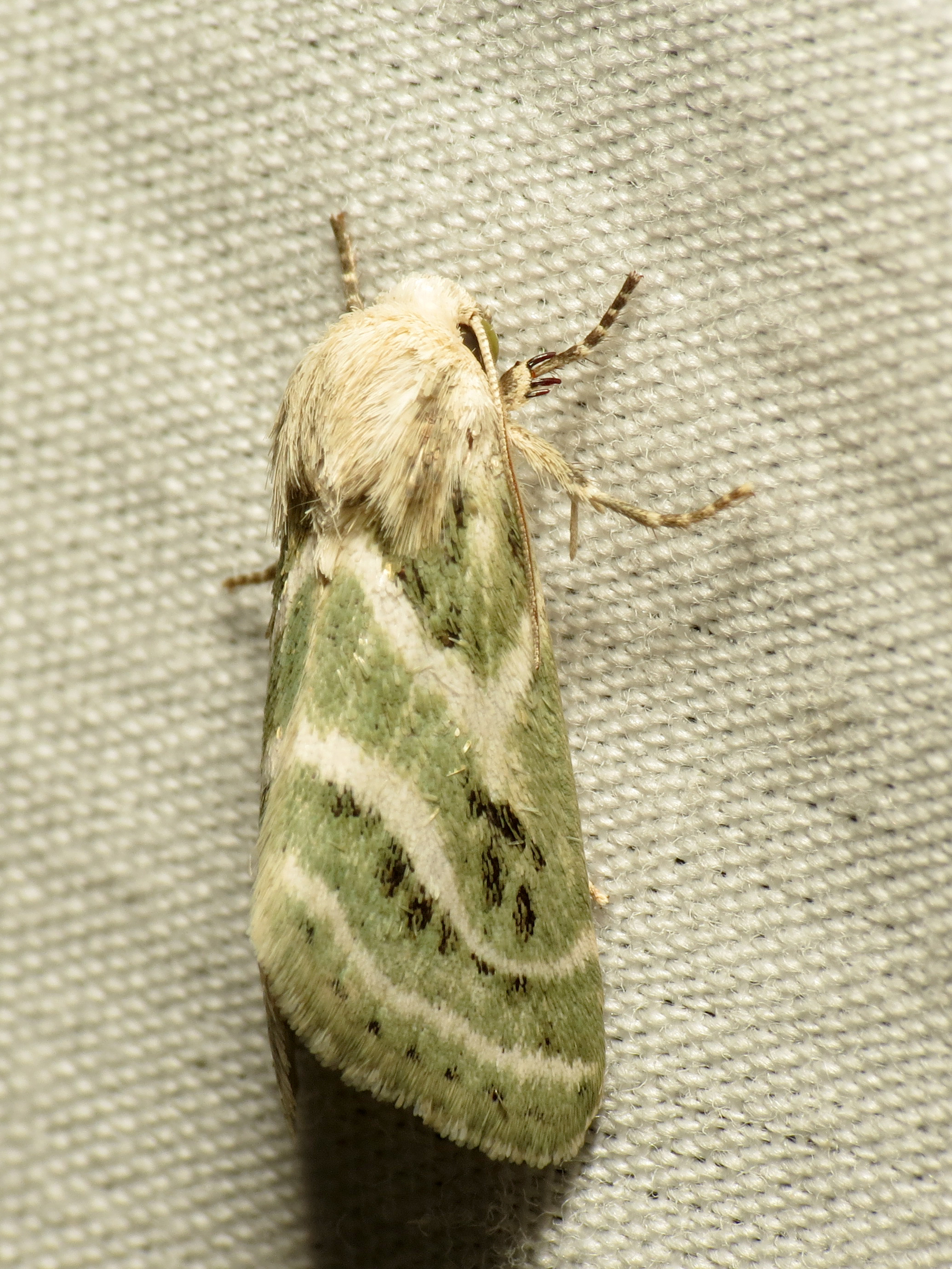
- Schinia accessa female specimen

Scientific classification
- Domain: Eukaryota
- Kingdom: Animalia
- Phylum: Arthropoda
- Class: Insecta
- Order: Lepidoptera
- Superfamily: Noctuoidea
- Family: Noctuidae
- Genus: Schinia
- Species: S. accessa

Binomial name
- Schinia accessa Smith, 1906

= Schinia accessa =

Species of moth

Schinia accessa is a moth of the family Noctuidae. It is found in Texas, southern Arizona, Colorado and Mexico.

The wingspan is about 27 mm.

The larvae feed on Artemisia tridentata.
