= Schinia carrizoensis =

Scientific classification
- Domain: Eukaryota
- Kingdom: Animalia
- Phylum: Arthropoda
- Class: Insecta
- Order: Lepidoptera
- Superfamily: Noctuoidea
- Family: Noctuidae
- Genus: Schinia
- Species: S. carrizoensis

Binomial name
- Schinia carrizoensis Osborne, 2010

Species of moth

The Carrizo flower moth (Schinia carrizoensis) is a moth of the family Noctuidae. It is known from central California.

The wingspan is about 31 mm.
