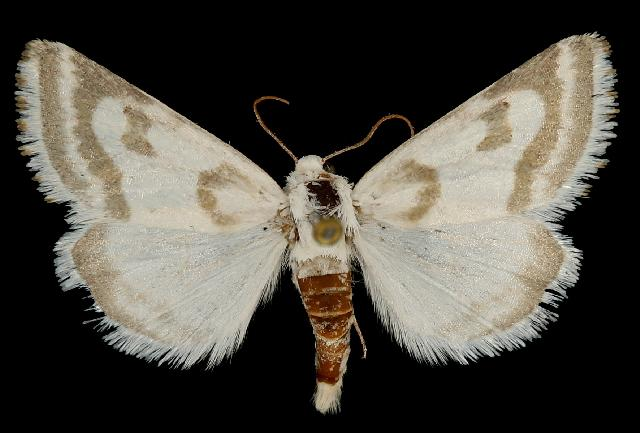

Scientific classification
- Domain: Eukaryota
- Kingdom: Animalia
- Phylum: Arthropoda
- Class: Insecta
- Order: Lepidoptera
- Superfamily: Noctuoidea
- Family: Noctuidae
- Genus: Schinia
- Species: S. reniformis

Binomial name
- Schinia reniformis Smith, 1900

= Schinia reniformis =

Species of moth

Schinia reniformis is a moth of the family Noctuidae. It is found in North America including Oklahoma and Utah.

The wingspan is about 20 mm.
