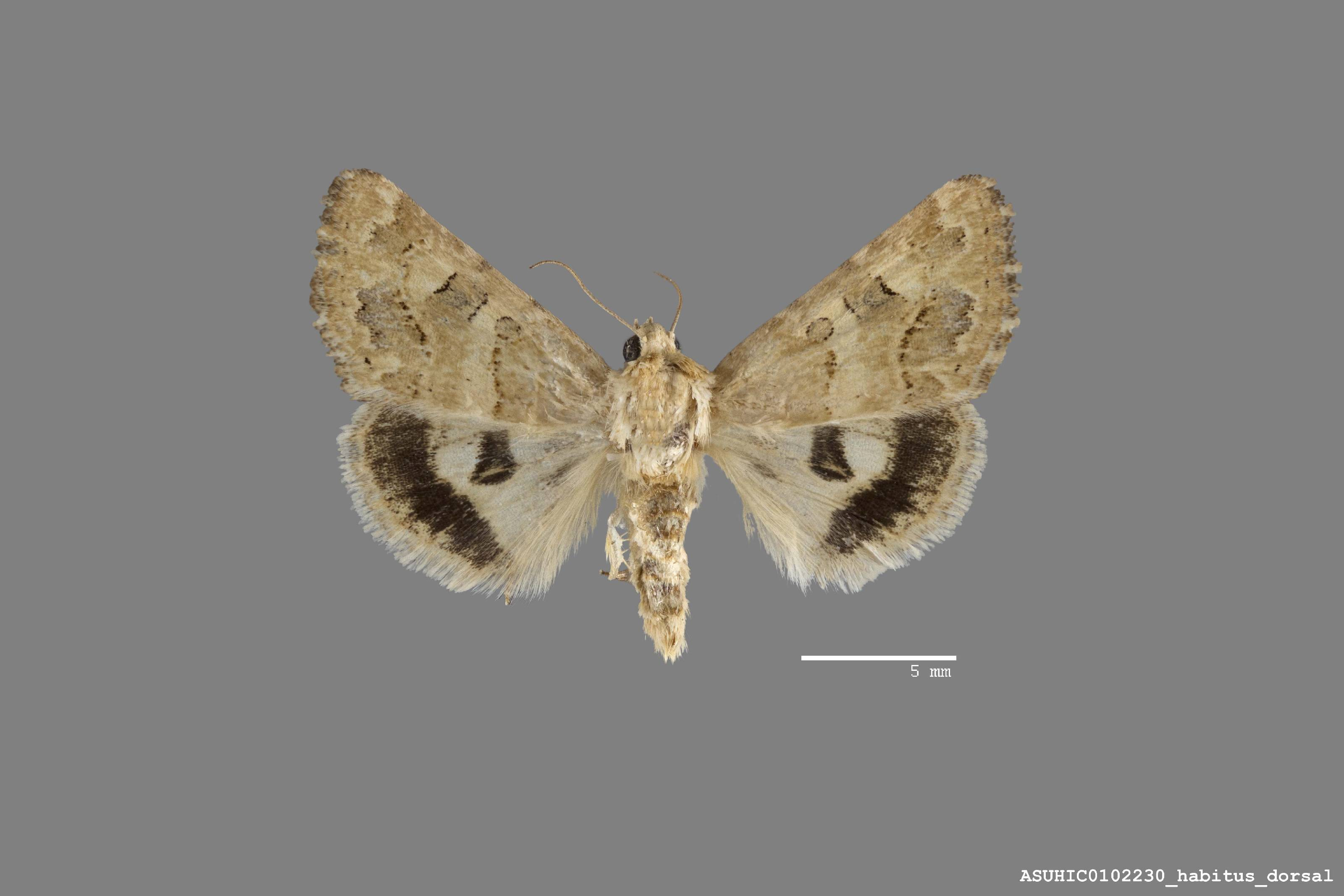

Scientific classification
- Kingdom: Animalia
- Phylum: Arthropoda
- Class: Insecta
- Order: Lepidoptera
- Superfamily: Noctuoidea
- Family: Noctuidae
- Genus: Schinia
- Species: S. erosa

Binomial name
- Schinia erosa Smith, 1906

= Schinia erosa =

Species of moth

Schinia erosa is a moth of the family Noctuidae. It is found in the desert areas east of the Peninsular Range of southern California. It has also been recorded from south central Arizona.

Adults are on wing from late summer to early November.

The larvae feed on Isocoma acredenia.
