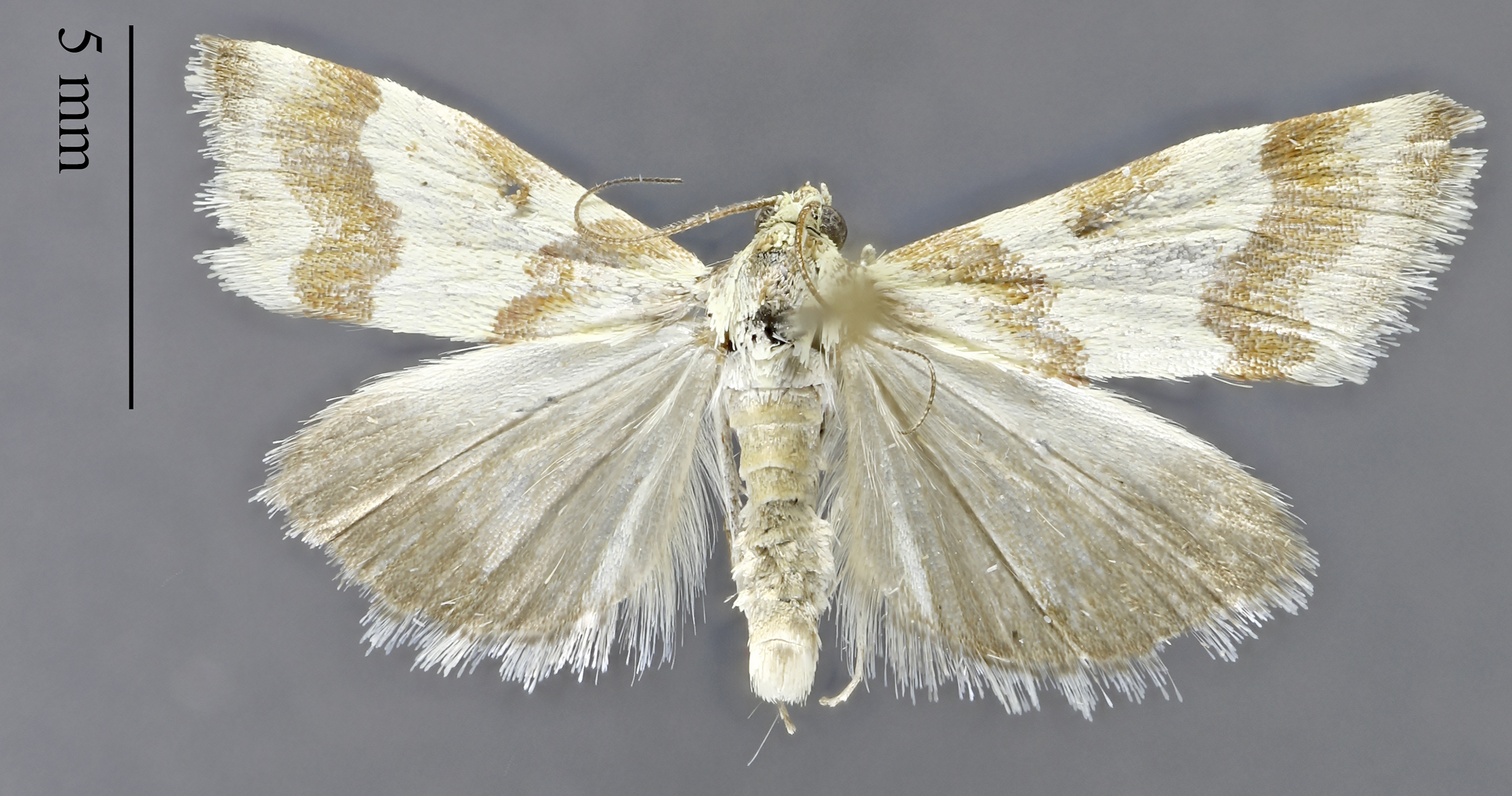

Scientific classification
- Kingdom: Animalia
- Phylum: Arthropoda
- Class: Insecta
- Order: Lepidoptera
- Superfamily: Noctuoidea
- Family: Noctuidae
- Genus: Schinia
- Species: S. velaris

Binomial name
- Schinia velaris Grote, 1878

Synonyms
- Schinia ochreifascia Smith, 1891

= Schinia velaris =

Species of moth

Schinia velaris is a moth of the family Noctuidae. It is found in North America, including Arizona and California.

The wingspan is about 25 mm.

The larvae feed on Lepidospartum squamatum.
