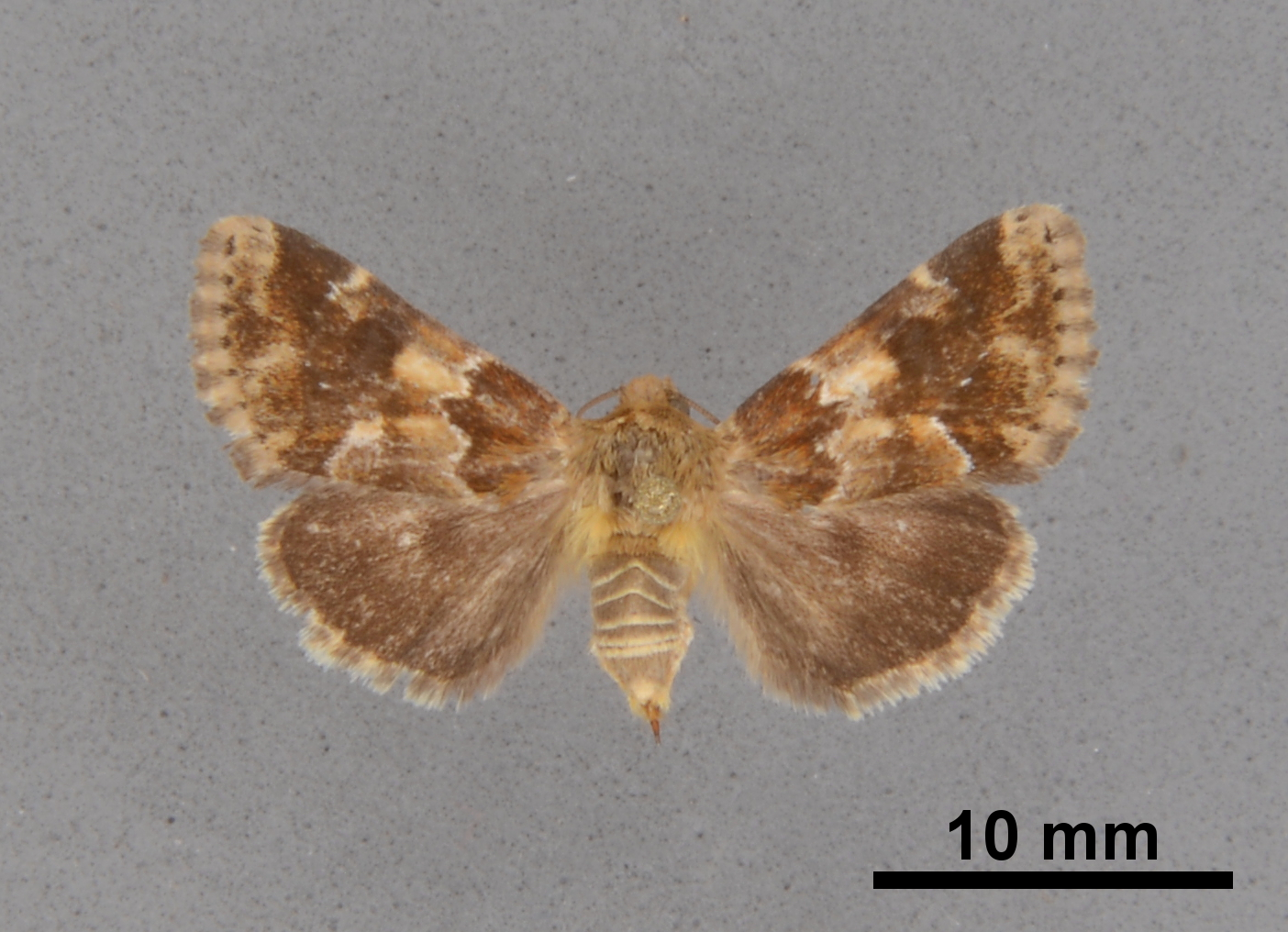

Scientific classification
- Kingdom: Animalia
- Phylum: Arthropoda
- Clade: Pancrustacea
- Class: Insecta
- Order: Lepidoptera
- Superfamily: Noctuoidea
- Family: Noctuidae
- Genus: Schinia
- Species: S. parmeliana

Binomial name
- Schinia parmeliana H. Edwards, 1882

Synonyms
- Schinia concinna Smith, 1891

= Schinia parmeliana =

Species of moth

Schinia parmeliana is a moth of the family Noctuidae. It is found in North America, including Maryland, Texas, South Carolina and Oklahoma.

The wingspan is about 20 mm.
