= Schinia graefiana =

Scientific classification
- Domain: Eukaryota
- Kingdom: Animalia
- Phylum: Arthropoda
- Class: Insecta
- Order: Lepidoptera
- Superfamily: Noctuoidea
- Family: Noctuidae
- Genus: Schinia
- Species: S. graefiana

Binomial name
- Schinia graefiana Tepper, 1882

Synonyms
- Heliothis graefiana; Schinia triolata

Species of moth

Schinia graefiana is a moth of the family Noctuidae. It is found in South-Western North America, including California.

The wingspan is about 19 mm.

The larvae feed on Chaenactis species, including Chaenactis fremontii.
