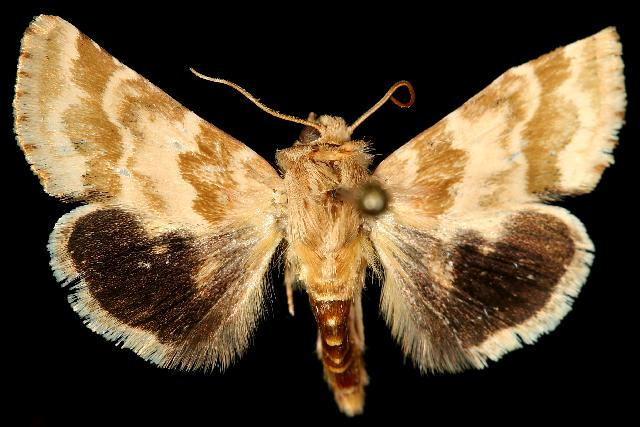

Scientific classification
- Domain: Eukaryota
- Kingdom: Animalia
- Phylum: Arthropoda
- Class: Insecta
- Order: Lepidoptera
- Superfamily: Noctuoidea
- Family: Noctuidae
- Genus: Schinia
- Species: S. errans

Binomial name
- Schinia errans Smith, 1883

Synonyms
- Lygranthoecia errans

= Schinia errans =

Species of moth

Schinia errans is a moth of the family Noctuidae. It is found in North America, including Arizona.

The wingspan is about 22 mm.

The larvae feed on Machaeranthera tanacetifolia.
