= Schinia tobia =

Scientific classification
- Domain: Eukaryota
- Kingdom: Animalia
- Phylum: Arthropoda
- Class: Insecta
- Order: Lepidoptera
- Superfamily: Noctuoidea
- Family: Noctuidae
- Genus: Schinia
- Species: S. tobia

Binomial name
- Schinia tobia Smith, 1906

Species of moth

Schinia tobia is a moth of the family Noctuidae. It is in North America, including Arizona, California and New Mexico.

The wingspan is about 23 mm.

The larvae feed on Dicoria canescens.
