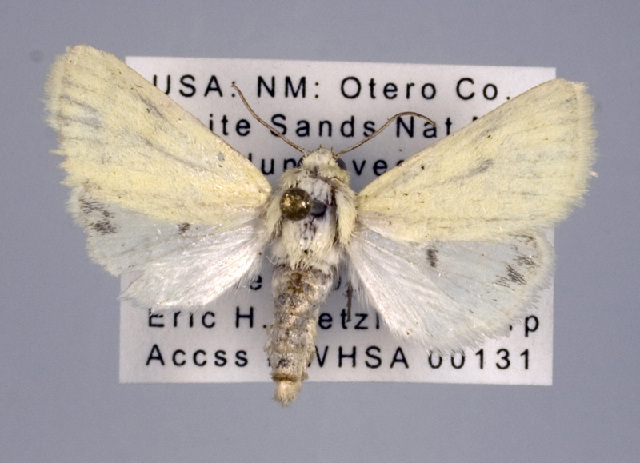

Scientific classification
- Domain: Eukaryota
- Kingdom: Animalia
- Phylum: Arthropoda
- Class: Insecta
- Order: Lepidoptera
- Superfamily: Noctuoidea
- Family: Noctuidae
- Genus: Schinia
- Species: S. luxa

Binomial name
- Schinia luxa (Grote, 1881)

Synonyms
- Bessula luxa Grote, 1881

= Schinia luxa =

Species of moth

Schinia luxa is a moth of the family Noctuidae. It is found in North America, including Arizona, California, Texas, New Mexico and north-western Mexico. It is typically white to light gray, sometimes (but not always) with dark grey spots.

The wingspan is 26–31 mm. Adults are on wing from August to September depending on the location.

The larvae feed on Mentzelia species.
