= Schinia rufocostulata =

Scientific classification
- Kingdom: Animalia
- Phylum: Arthropoda
- Class: Insecta
- Order: Lepidoptera
- Superfamily: Noctuoidea
- Family: Noctuidae
- Genus: Schinia
- Species: S. rufocostulata

Binomial name
- Schinia rufocostulata Pogue & Harp, 2005

Species of moth

Schinia rufocostulata is a moth of the family Noctuidae. It is only known from south-western Texas.
