= Schinia aetheria =

Scientific classification
- Domain: Eukaryota
- Kingdom: Animalia
- Phylum: Arthropoda
- Class: Insecta
- Order: Lepidoptera
- Superfamily: Noctuoidea
- Family: Noctuidae
- Genus: Schinia
- Species: S. aetheria

Binomial name
- Schinia aetheria Barnes & McDunnough, 1912

Species of moth

Schinia aetheria is a moth of the family Noctuidae first described by William Barnes and James Halliday McDunnough in 1912. It is found in North America, including Arizona, Nevada, New Mexico and Utah.

It was formerly considered a subspecies of Schinia sueta.

The wingspan is 24–25 mm.
