= Schinia chilensis =

Scientific classification
- Kingdom: Animalia
- Phylum: Arthropoda
- Class: Insecta
- Order: Lepidoptera
- Superfamily: Noctuoidea
- Family: Noctuidae
- Genus: Schinia
- Species: S. chilensis

Binomial name
- Schinia chilensis (Hampson, 1903)

Synonyms
- Chloridea chilensis Hampson, 1903

Species of moth

Schinia chilensis is a moth of the family Noctuidae. It is endemic to Chile.
