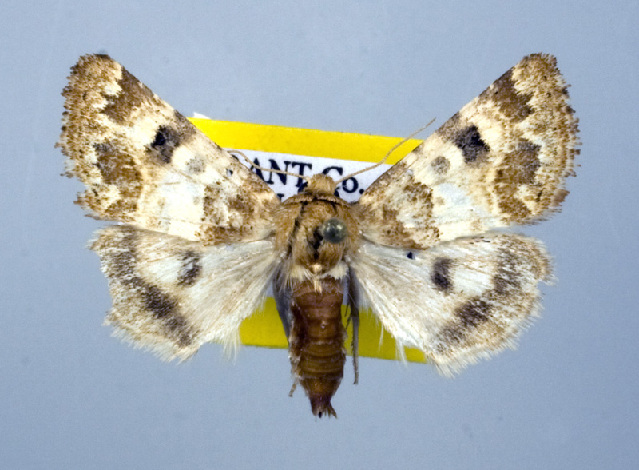

Scientific classification
- Domain: Eukaryota
- Kingdom: Animalia
- Phylum: Arthropoda
- Class: Insecta
- Order: Lepidoptera
- Superfamily: Noctuoidea
- Family: Noctuidae
- Genus: Schinia
- Species: S. ferrisi

Binomial name
- Schinia ferrisi Pogue & Harp, 2004

= Schinia ferrisi =

Species of moth

Schinia ferrisi is a moth of the family Noctuidae. It is found south-eastern Arizona and south-western New Mexico.

Adults are on wing in September.
