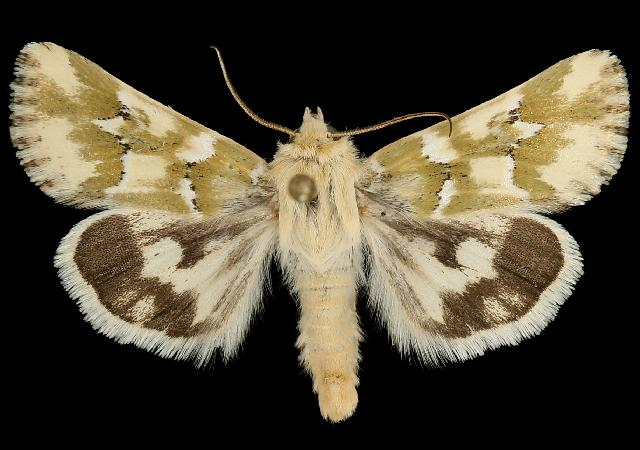

Scientific classification
- Domain: Eukaryota
- Kingdom: Animalia
- Phylum: Arthropoda
- Class: Insecta
- Order: Lepidoptera
- Superfamily: Noctuoidea
- Family: Noctuidae
- Genus: Schinia
- Species: S. meadi

Binomial name
- Schinia meadi Grote, 1873

= Schinia meadi =

Species of moth

Schinia meadi, or Mead's flower moth, is a moth of the family Noctuidae. The species was first described by Augustus Radcliffe Grote in 1873. It is found in western North America from south central Saskatchewan and central Alberta west to south central Washington, south to Arizona and New Mexico.

The wingspan is about 24 mm. Adults are on wing from June to July depending on the location.
