= Schinia macneilli =

Scientific classification
- Kingdom: Animalia
- Phylum: Arthropoda
- Clade: Pancrustacea
- Class: Insecta
- Order: Lepidoptera
- Superfamily: Noctuoidea
- Family: Noctuidae
- Genus: Schinia
- Species: S. macneilli

Binomial name
- Schinia macneilli Hardwick, 1996

Species of moth

Schinia macneilli is a moth of the family Noctuidae. It is found in California.

The wingspan is about 22 mm.
