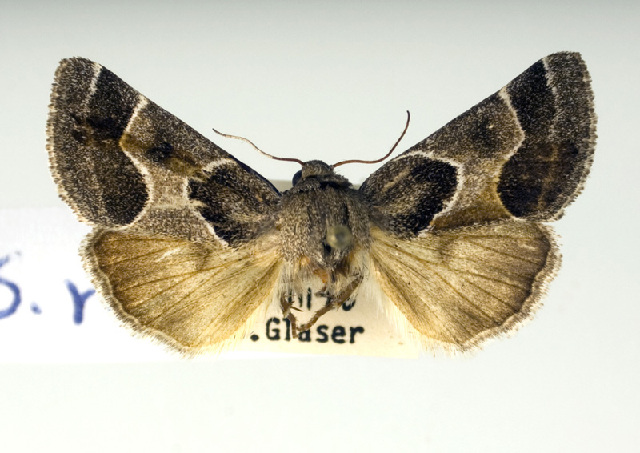

Scientific classification
- Kingdom: Animalia
- Phylum: Arthropoda
- Class: Insecta
- Order: Lepidoptera
- Superfamily: Noctuoidea
- Family: Noctuidae
- Genus: Schinia
- Species: S. rivulosa

Binomial name
- Schinia rivulosa Guenée, 1852

Synonyms
- Lygranthoecia constricta; Schinia marginata; Schinia contracta; Schinia designata; Schinia constricta

= Schinia rivulosa =

Species of moth

Schinia rivulosa, the ragweed flower moth, is a moth of the family Noctuidae. The species was first described by Achille Guenée in 1852. It is found in North America from Quebec to Florida, west to Arizona, north to Oregon and North Dakota. There is one generation per year.

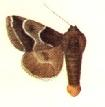

The wingspan is 25–31 mm. The moth flies from July to October depending on the location. There is one generation per year.

The larvae feed on Ambrosia species.
