= Schinia scissa =

Scientific classification
- Kingdom: Animalia
- Phylum: Arthropoda
- Class: Insecta
- Order: Lepidoptera
- Superfamily: Noctuoidea
- Family: Noctuidae
- Genus: Schinia
- Species: S. scissa

Binomial name
- Schinia scissa Grote, 1876

Synonyms
- Canidia scissa Dyar, 1903

Species of moth

Schinia scissa is a moth of the family Noctuidae. It is found in North America, including Florida.
