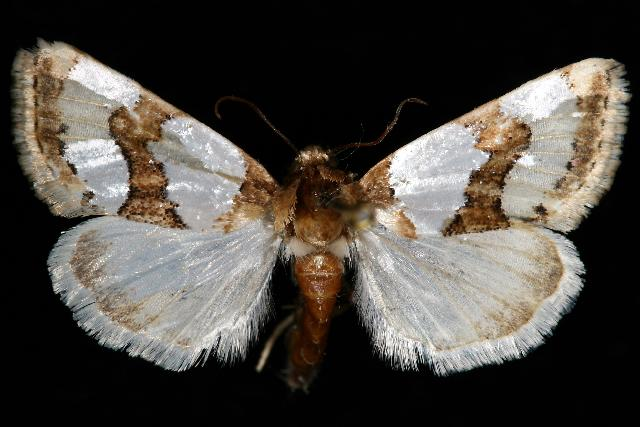
- Schinia chrysella female

Scientific classification
- Domain: Eukaryota
- Kingdom: Animalia
- Phylum: Arthropoda
- Class: Insecta
- Order: Lepidoptera
- Superfamily: Noctuoidea
- Family: Noctuidae
- Genus: Schinia
- Species: S. chrysella

Binomial name
- Schinia chrysella Grote, 1874

Synonyms
- Schinia lanul (Strecker, 1877); Schinia chrysellus; Tricopis chrysellus Grote, 1874; Heliothis conchula Felder & Rogenhofer, 1874; Heliothis lanul Strecker, 1877; Lygranthoecia lanul Grote, 1890

= Schinia chrysella =

Species of moth

Schinia chrysella is a moth of the family Noctuidae. It is found throughout the central United States south to Monterry, Mexico.

Schinia chrysella female

Schinia chrysella male

The wingspan is about 23 mm.

The larvae feed on Amphiachyris dracunculoides.
