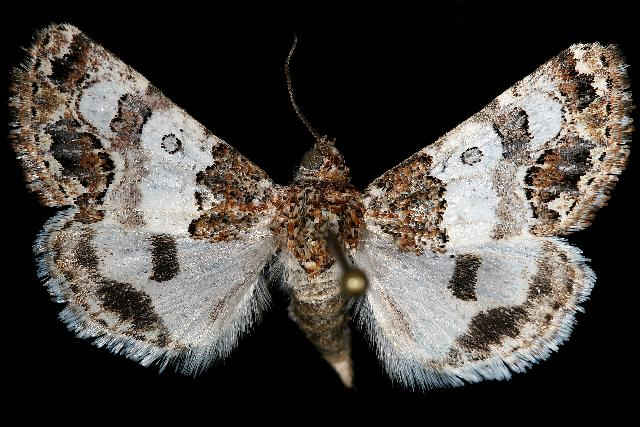

Scientific classification
- Domain: Eukaryota
- Kingdom: Animalia
- Phylum: Arthropoda
- Class: Insecta
- Order: Lepidoptera
- Superfamily: Noctuoidea
- Family: Noctuidae
- Genus: Schinia
- Species: S. albafascia

Binomial name
- Schinia albafascia Smith, 1883

= Schinia albafascia =

Species of moth

Schinia albafascia is a moth of the family Noctuidae. It is found south-western Montana and Idaho, west to Oregon, south to central and southern California, east to Arizona, New Mexico and Colorado.

Adults are on wing from July to October.

The larvae feed on Ericameria nauseosa.
