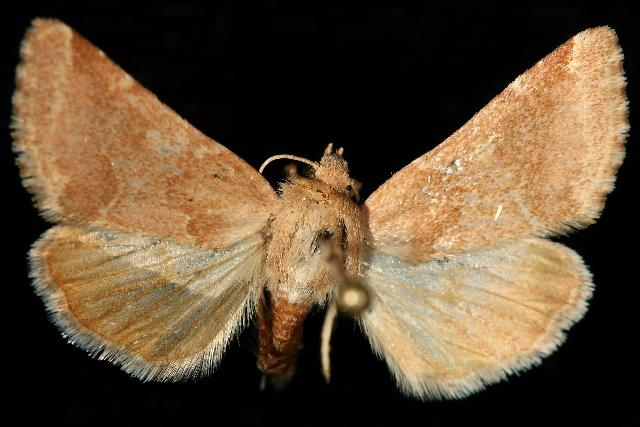

Scientific classification
- Domain: Eukaryota
- Kingdom: Animalia
- Phylum: Arthropoda
- Class: Insecta
- Order: Lepidoptera
- Superfamily: Noctuoidea
- Family: Noctuidae
- Genus: Schinia
- Species: S. diffusa

Binomial name
- Schinia diffusa Smith, 1891

Synonyms
- Schinia neglecta Strecker, 1898

= Schinia diffusa =

Species of moth

Schinia diffusa is a moth of the family Noctuidae. It is found in North America, including Colorado and Texas.

The wingspan is 23–28 mm.

The larvae feed on Machaeranthera annua.
