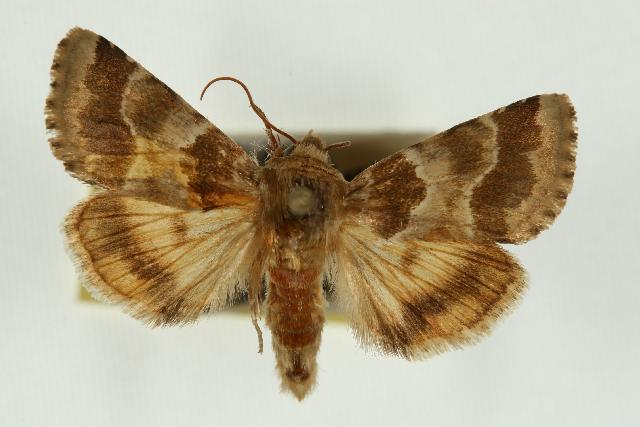

Scientific classification
- Kingdom: Animalia
- Phylum: Arthropoda
- Class: Insecta
- Order: Lepidoptera
- Superfamily: Noctuoidea
- Family: Noctuidae
- Genus: Schinia
- Species: S. hanga

Binomial name
- Schinia hanga Strecker, 1898

= Schinia hanga =

Species of moth

Schinia hanga is a moth of the family Noctuidae. It is found in North America, including Kansas, Oklahoma and Texas.

The wingspan is about 28 mm.
