= Schinia erythrias =

Scientific classification
- Domain: Eukaryota
- Kingdom: Animalia
- Phylum: Arthropoda
- Class: Insecta
- Order: Lepidoptera
- Superfamily: Noctuoidea
- Family: Noctuidae
- Genus: Schinia
- Species: S. erythrias

Binomial name
- Schinia erythrias Pogue, 2006

Synonyms
- Schinia pulchra

Species of moth

Schinia erythrias is a moth of the family Noctuidae. It is only known from Durango, Mexico.

The length of the fore wings is 12–13 mm for males. Adults are on wing in late August.
