= Schinia oculata =

- schinia oculata

Scientific classification
- Domain: Eukaryota
- Kingdom: Animalia
- Phylum: Arthropoda
- Class: Insecta
- Order: Lepidoptera
- Superfamily: Noctuoidea
- Family: Noctuidae
- Genus: Schinia
- Species: S. oculata

Binomial name
- Schinia oculata Smith, 1900

Synonyms
- Schinia macroptica

Species of moth

Schinia oculata is a moth of the family Noctuidae. It is found in North America including Arizona and California.

The wingspan is about 23 mm.

The larvae feed on Baccharis sarothroides.
