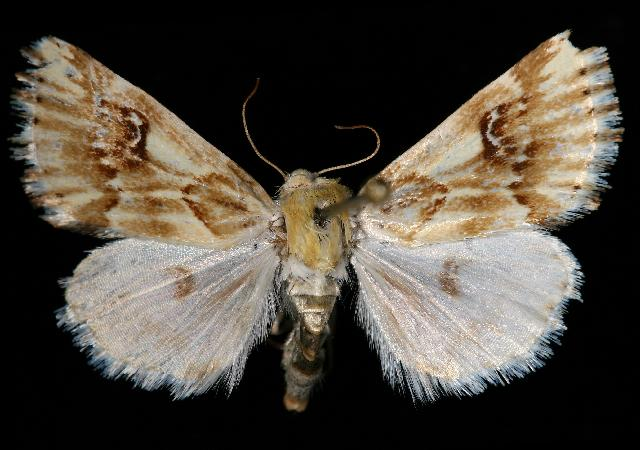

Scientific classification
- Kingdom: Animalia
- Phylum: Arthropoda
- Class: Insecta
- Order: Lepidoptera
- Superfamily: Noctuoidea
- Family: Noctuidae
- Genus: Schinia
- Species: S. illustra

Binomial name
- Schinia illustra Smith, 1906

= Schinia illustra =

Species of moth

Schinia illustra is a moth of the family Noctuidae. It is found in North America, including Colorado, Nevada, New Mexico, Utah and Wyoming.

The wingspan is 24–26 mm.
