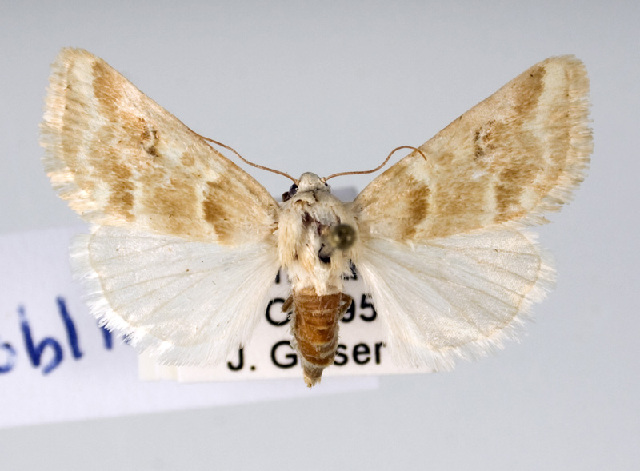

Scientific classification
- Kingdom: Animalia
- Phylum: Arthropoda
- Class: Insecta
- Order: Lepidoptera
- Superfamily: Noctuoidea
- Family: Noctuidae
- Genus: Schinia
- Species: S. coercita

Binomial name
- Schinia coercita Grote, 1881

Synonyms
- Schinia alensa Smith, 1906

= Schinia coercita =

Species of moth

Schinia coercita is a moth of the family Noctuidae. It is found in North America, including Arizona and California.

The wingspan is about 23 mm.
