= Schinia antonio =

Scientific classification
- Domain: Eukaryota
- Kingdom: Animalia
- Phylum: Arthropoda
- Class: Insecta
- Order: Lepidoptera
- Superfamily: Noctuoidea
- Family: Noctuidae
- Genus: Schinia
- Species: S. antonio

Binomial name
- Schinia antonio Smith, 1906

Species of moth

Schinia antonio is a moth of the family Noctuidae. It is endemic to southern Texas.

The wingspan is about 9 mm.

The larvae feed on Aphanostephus species.
