= Schinia edwardsii =

Scientific classification
- Domain: Eukaryota
- Kingdom: Animalia
- Phylum: Arthropoda
- Class: Insecta
- Order: Lepidoptera
- Superfamily: Noctuoidea
- Family: Noctuidae
- Genus: Schinia
- Species: S. edwardsii

Binomial name
- Schinia edwardsii Smith, 1906

Synonyms
- Schinia steenensis Hardwick, 1973; Schinia steensensis

Species of moth

Schinia edwardsii is a moth of the family Noctuidae. It is found from north-western Wyoming west to Montana, Idaho and eastern Oregon.

The wingspan is 17–21 mm.
