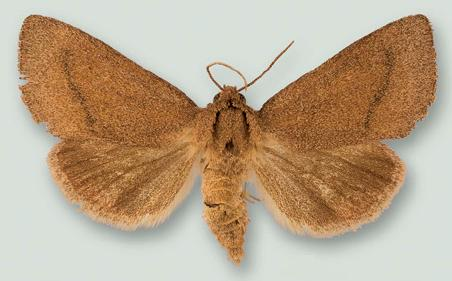

Scientific classification
- Domain: Eukaryota
- Kingdom: Animalia
- Phylum: Arthropoda
- Class: Insecta
- Order: Lepidoptera
- Superfamily: Noctuoidea
- Family: Noctuidae
- Genus: Schinia
- Species: S. psamathea

Binomial name
- Schinia psamathea Pogue, 2010

= Schinia psamathea =

Species of moth

Schinia psamathea is a moth of the family Noctuidae. It is known from east-central Georgia southwestward to the Panhandle of Florida, southeastern Alabama, and southwestern Mississippi. It seems to prefer sandy soils either in dune type habitats or near sandy beaches.

It is unique within the genus in having a simple forewing pattern that consists of only a slightly sinuate, dark-brown postmedial line and a solid-colored hindwing.

The length of the forewings is 12.6–14.2 mm for males and 12.6–13.8 mm for females. Adults are active in the mid- to late afternoon and are attracted to light. They nectar on several different flowers and the flight is similar to other day-flying Schinia, being very fast and darting. Adults fly between 7 September and the end of October, being most abundant in mid-October.

The larvae possibly feed on Chrysoma pauciflosculosa.

== Etymology ==
The specific epithet comes from the Greek noun, psamathos, for sand of the seashore. It is plural referring to the type of habitat that this species inhabits.
