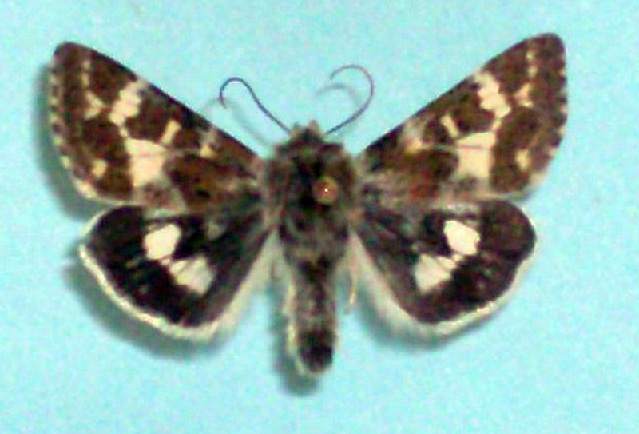

Scientific classification
- Domain: Eukaryota
- Kingdom: Animalia
- Phylum: Arthropoda
- Class: Insecta
- Order: Lepidoptera
- Superfamily: Noctuoidea
- Family: Noctuidae
- Genus: Schinia
- Species: S. honesta

Binomial name
- Schinia honesta Grote, 1881

= Schinia honesta =

Species of moth

Schinia honesta, or the black-spotted gem, is a moth of the family Noctuidae. The species was first described by Augustus Radcliffe Grote in 1881. It is found in southern Canada and California. The wingspan is about 25–26 mm.
