= Schinia perminuta =

Scientific classification
- Domain: Eukaryota
- Kingdom: Animalia
- Phylum: Arthropoda
- Class: Insecta
- Order: Lepidoptera
- Superfamily: Noctuoidea
- Family: Noctuidae
- Genus: Schinia
- Species: S. perminuta

Binomial name
- Schinia perminuta (H. Edwards, 1881)

Synonyms
- Schinia dubitans; Pseudotamila perminuta

Species of moth

The western small flower moth (Schinia perminuta) is a moth of the family Noctuidae. It is found in California.

The wingspan is about 15 mm.
