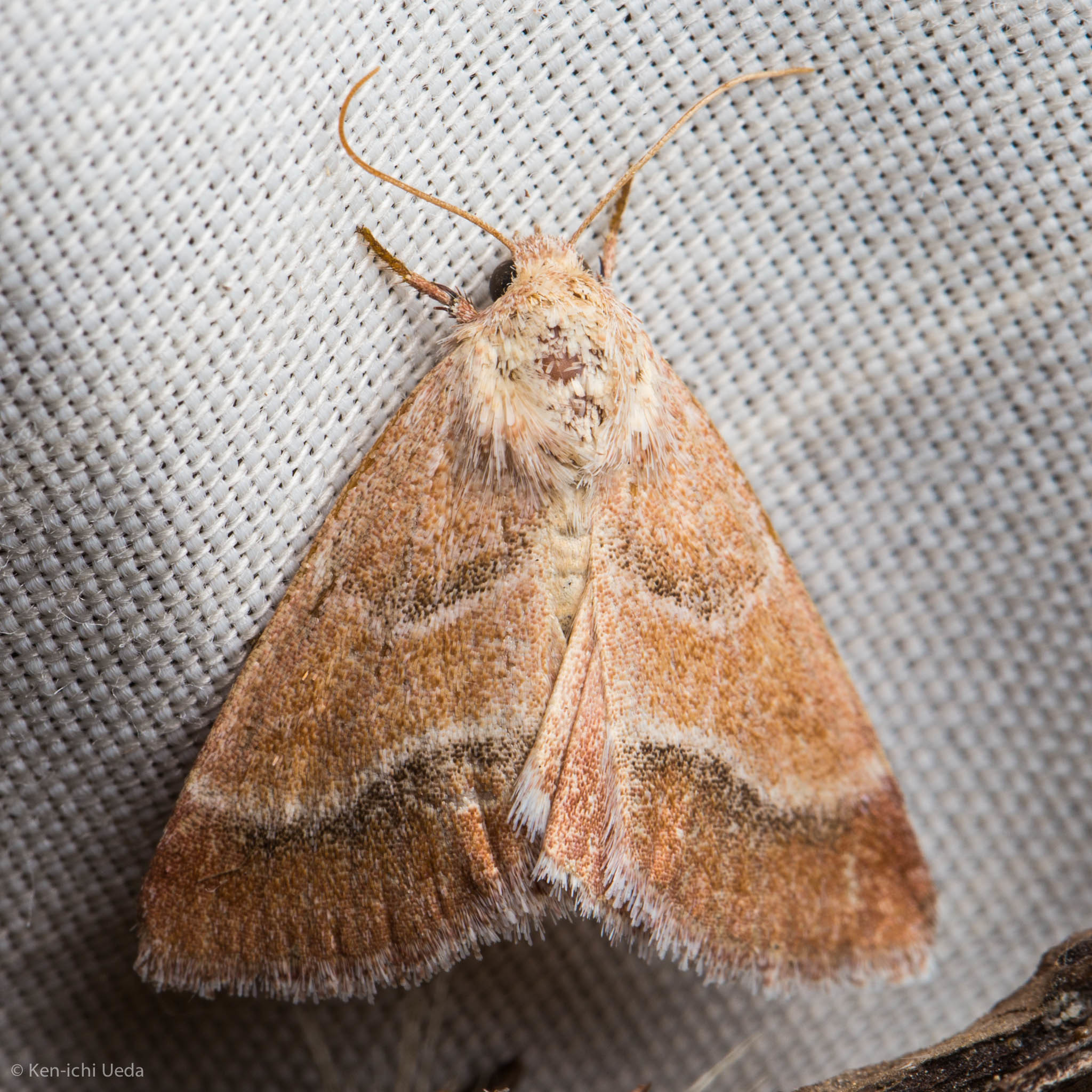

Scientific classification
- Domain: Eukaryota
- Kingdom: Animalia
- Phylum: Arthropoda
- Class: Insecta
- Order: Lepidoptera
- Superfamily: Noctuoidea
- Family: Noctuidae
- Genus: Schinia
- Species: S. buta

Binomial name
- Schinia buta Smith, 1907

= Schinia buta =

Species of moth

Schinia buta is a moth of the family Noctuidae. It is endemic to southeast California and northwest Nevada.

The wingspan is about 28 mm.

The larvae feed on Brickellia californica.
