= Schinia zuni =

Scientific classification
- Domain: Eukaryota
- Kingdom: Animalia
- Phylum: Arthropoda
- Class: Insecta
- Order: Lepidoptera
- Superfamily: Noctuoidea
- Family: Noctuidae
- Genus: Schinia
- Species: S. zuni

Binomial name
- Schinia zuni McElvare, 1950

Species of moth

Schinia zuni is a moth of the family Noctuidae. It is found in North America, including Arizona and New Mexico.

The wingspan is about 26 mm.
