= Isocoma drummondii =

Scientific classification
- Kingdom: Plantae
- Clade: Tracheophytes
- Clade: Angiosperms
- Clade: Eudicots
- Clade: Asterids
- Order: Asterales
- Family: Asteraceae
- Genus: Isocoma
- Species: I. drummondii

Binomial name
- Isocoma drummondii (Torr. & A.Gray) Greene 1894

Synonyms
- Synonymy: Aster berlandieri Kuntze; Bigelowia drummondii (Torr. & A.Gray) A.Gray; Bigelovia drummondi (Torr. & A.Gray) A.Gray; Chondrophora drummondii (A.Gray) A.Heller; Haplopappus drummondii (Torr. & A.Gray) S.F.Blake; Aplopappus drummondii (Torr. & A.Gray) S.F.Blake; Isocoma megalantha Shinners; Linosyris drummondii Torr. & A.Gray 1842

Species of flowering plant

Isocoma drummondii, the Drummond's goldenbush or Drummond's jimmyweed, is a North American plant species in the family Asteraceae. It has been found on both sides of the Río Grande, in Tamaulipas and in southern Texas.

Isocoma drummondii is a completely hairless shrub up to 100 cm (40 inches) tall. The plant produces flower heads in clusters on the tips of branches, each head containing 22–34 disc flowers but no ray flowers.
