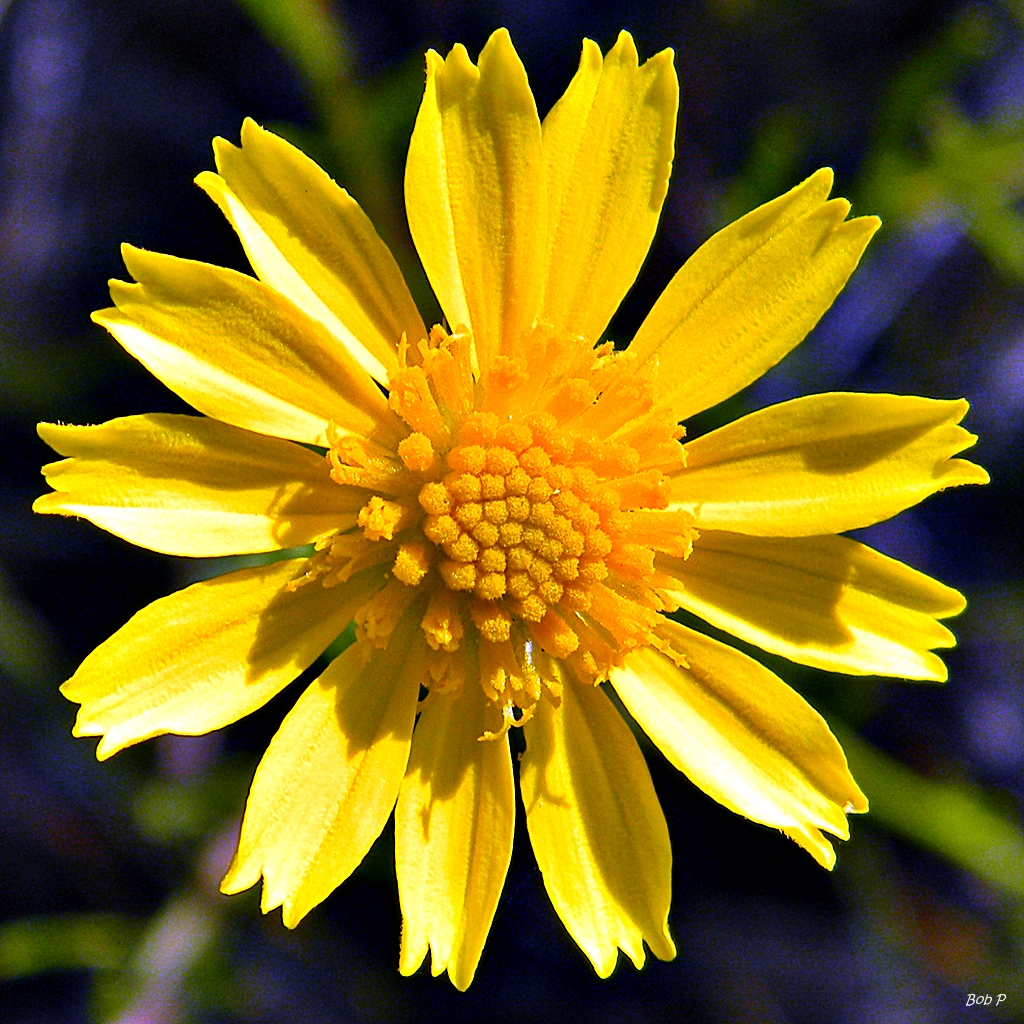

Conservation status
- Secure (NatureServe)

Scientific classification
- Kingdom: Plantae
- Clade: Tracheophytes
- Clade: Angiosperms
- Clade: Eudicots
- Clade: Asterids
- Order: Asterales
- Family: Asteraceae
- Genus: Balduina
- Species: B. angustifolia

Binomial name
- Balduina angustifolia (Pursh) B.L. Rob.

Synonyms
- Actinospermum angustifolium (Pursh) Torr. & A.Gray; Balduina multiflora Nutt.; Buphthalmum angustifolium Pursh

= Balduina angustifolia =

Species of flowering plant

Balduina angustifolia, the coastal plain honeycombhead, is a species of plants in the sunflower family that grows in North America. It is native to the southeastern United States (Florida, Georgia, Alabama, Mississippi). An herb with branching stems. Each plant has 20 or more flower heads, each with yellow ray florets and yellow disc florets. The species grows in sandy soil, often in pinelands. According to the Florida Wildflower foundation it is an annual or biennial.
