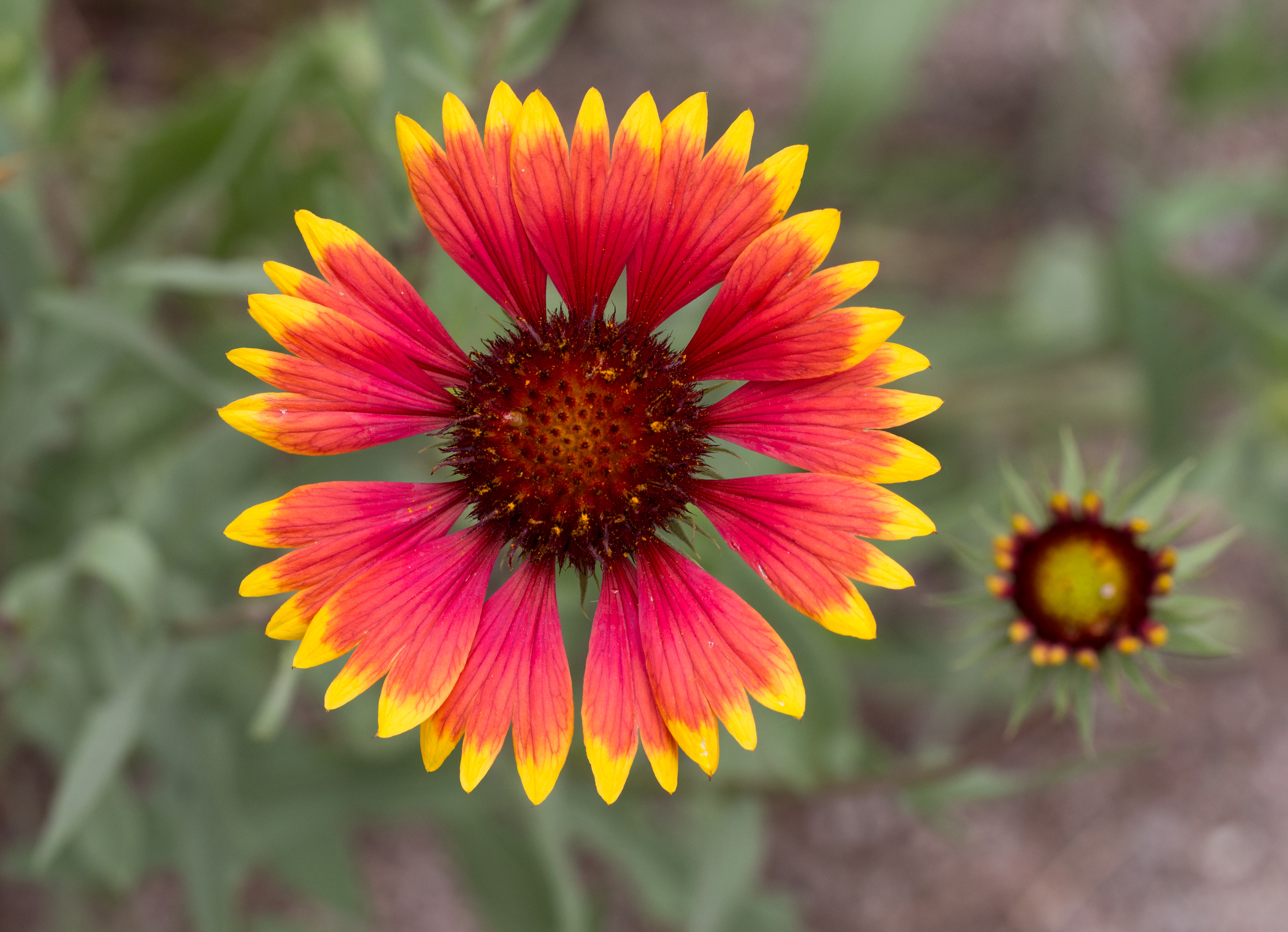
- Gaillardia pulchella

Scientific classification
- Kingdom: Plantae
- Clade: Tracheophytes
- Clade: Angiosperms
- Clade: Eudicots
- Clade: Asterids
- Order: Asterales
- Family: Asteraceae
- Subfamily: Asteroideae
- Tribe: Helenieae
- Subtribe: Gaillardiinae
- Genus: Gaillardia; Foug.

Synonyms
- Guentheria Spreng.; Galordia Raeusch.; Polypteris Less.; Calonnea Buc'hoz; Cercostylos Less.; Othake Raf.; Agassizia A.Gray & Engelm.

= Gaillardia =

Genus of flowering plants

Gaillardia /ɡeɪˈlɑːrdiə/ (common name blanket flower) is a genus of flowering plants in the family Asteraceae, native to North and South America. It was named after Maître Gaillard de Charentonneau, an 18th-century French magistrate who was an enthusiastic botanist. The common name may refer to the resemblance of the inflorescence to the brightly patterned blankets made by Native Americans, or to the ability of wild taxa to blanket the ground with colonies. Many cultivars have been bred for ornamental use.

== Description ==
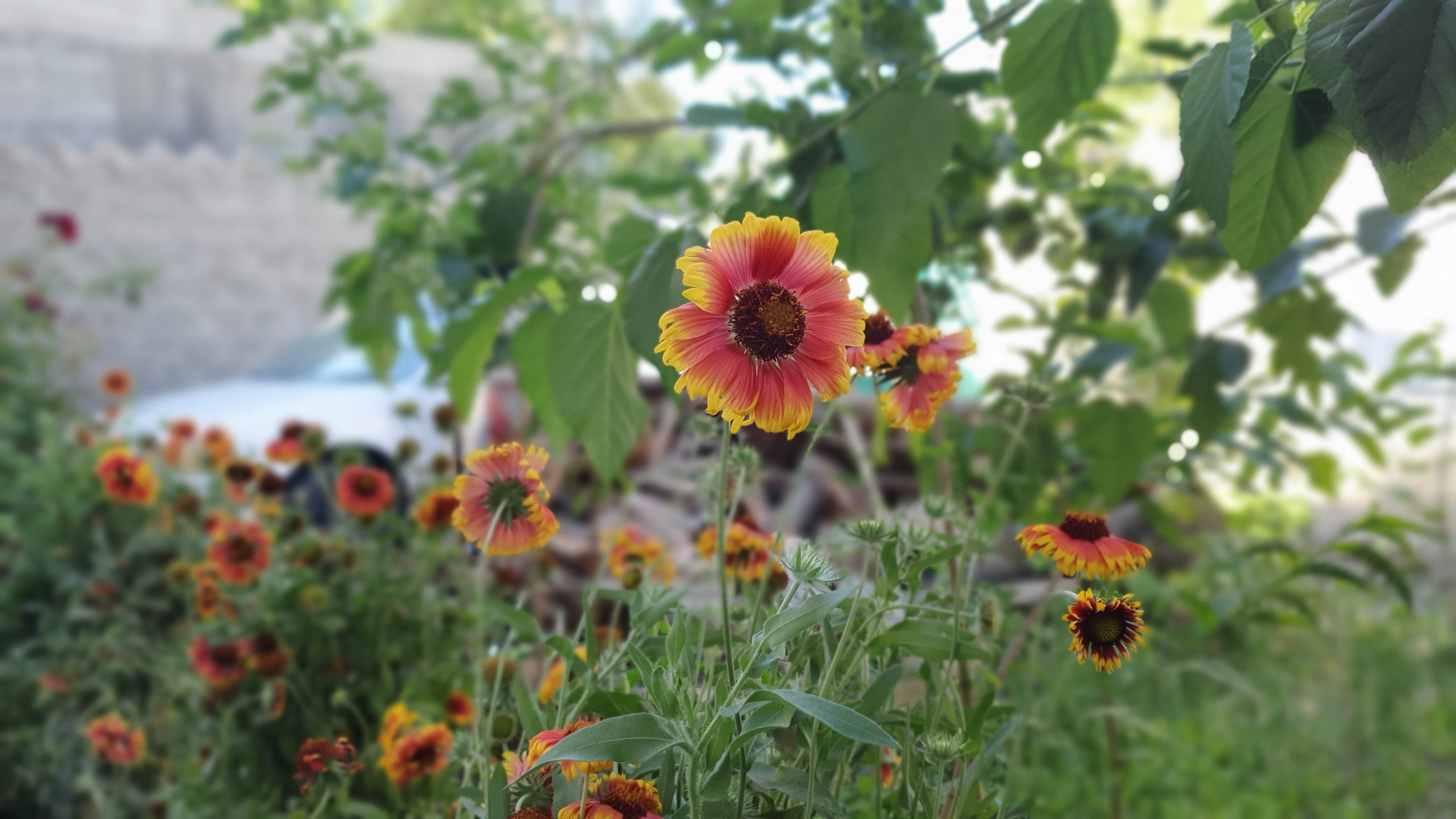
Cultivated Gaillardia in Gahkuch, Pakistan.

These are annual or perennial herbs or subshrubs, sometimes with rhizomes. The stem is usually branching and erect to a maximum height around 80 centimetres (31 in). The leaves are alternately arranged. Some taxa have only basal leaves. They vary in shape. They are glandular in most species. The inflorescence is a solitary flower head. The head can have 15 or more ray florets, while some taxa lack any ray florets. They can be almost any shade of yellow, orange, red, purplish, brown, white, or bicolored. They are sometimes rolled into a funnel shape. There are many tubular disc florets at the center of the head in a similar range of colors, and usually tipped with hairs. The fruit usually has a pappus of scales.

== Ecology ==
Gaillardia species are used as food plants by the caterpillars of some Lepidoptera species, including Schinia bina (which has been recorded on G. pulchella), Schinia masoni (which feeds exclusively on G. aristata), and Schinia volupia (which feeds exclusively on G. pulchella).

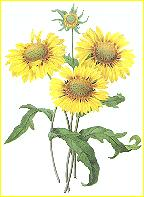
red dome blanketflower (Gaillardia pinnatifida)

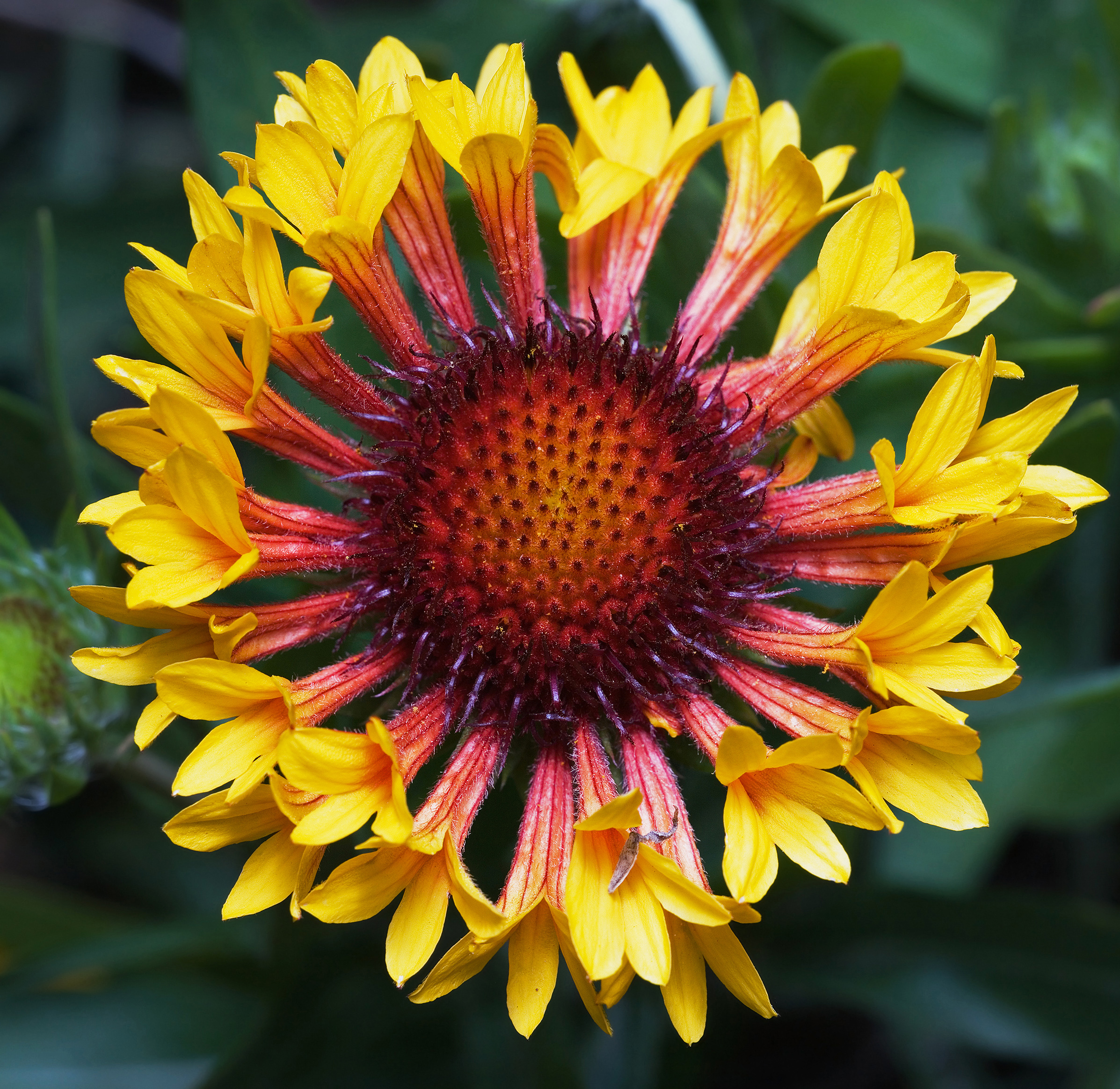
Gaillardia 'Fanfare'

== Symbolism ==
It is the official flower of Wallonia.
The school colors of Texas State University are maroon and old gold, a combination inspired by the gaillardia.

== Species ==
Species include:

- Gaillardia aestivalis (Walter) H.Rock – lanceleaf blanketflower southeastern USA
- Gaillardia amblyodon J.Gay – maroon blanketflower - Texas
- Gaillardia aristata Pursh – common gaillardia - Canada, northern + western USA
- Gaillardia arizonica A.Gray – Arizona blanketflower - Sonora, southwestern USA
- Gaillardia cabrerae (Lihue Calel, Argentina)
- Gaillardia coahuilensis B.L.Turner – bandanna daisy - Coahuila, Texas
- Gaillardia comosa A.Gray - northern Mexico
- Gaillardia doniana (Hook. & Arn.) Griseb. - Argentina
- Gaillardia gypsophila B.L.Turner - Coahuila
- Gaillardia henricksonii B.L.Turner - Coahuila
- Gaillardia megapotamica (Spreng.) Baker - Argentina – boton de oro
  - Gaillardia megapotamica var. radiata (San Luis, Argentina)
  - Gaillardia megapotamica var. scabiosoides
- Gaillardia mexicana A.Gray - northeastern Mexico
- Gaillardia multiceps Greene – onion blanketflower - Arizona, Texas, New Mexico
- Gaillardia parryi Greene – Parry's blanketflower - Utah, Arizona
- Gaillardia pinnatifida Torr. – red dome blanketflower - northern Mexico, western USA
- Gaillardia powellii B.L.Turner - Coahuila
- Gaillardia pulchella Foug. – firewheel - southern + central USA, central Canada, northern Mexico
- Gaillardia serotina (Walter) H. Rock - southeastern USA
- Gaillardia spathulata A.Gray – western blanketflower - Utah, Colorado
- Gaillardia suavis (A.Gray & Engelm.) Britton & Rusby – perfumeballs - northeastern Mexico, south-central USA
- Gaillardia tontalensis (San Juan Province, Argentina)
- Gaillardia turneri Averett & A.M.Powell - Chihuahua

=== Hybrids ===
- Gaillardia × grandiflora hort. ex Van Houtte [G. aristata × G. pulchella]

=== Formerly placed here ===
- Helenium amarum (Raf.) H.Rock var. amarum (as G. amara Raf.)
- Tetraneuris acaulis (Pursh) Greene var. acaulis (as G. acaulis Pursh)

== Gallery ==
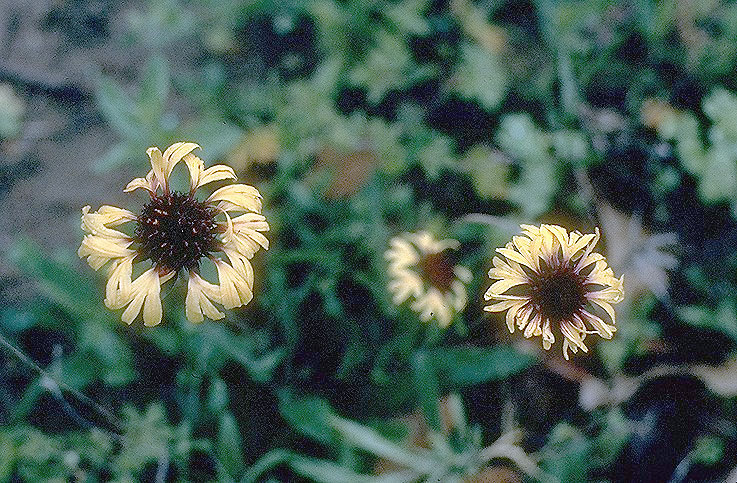
lanceleaf blanketflower (Gaillardia aestivalis)

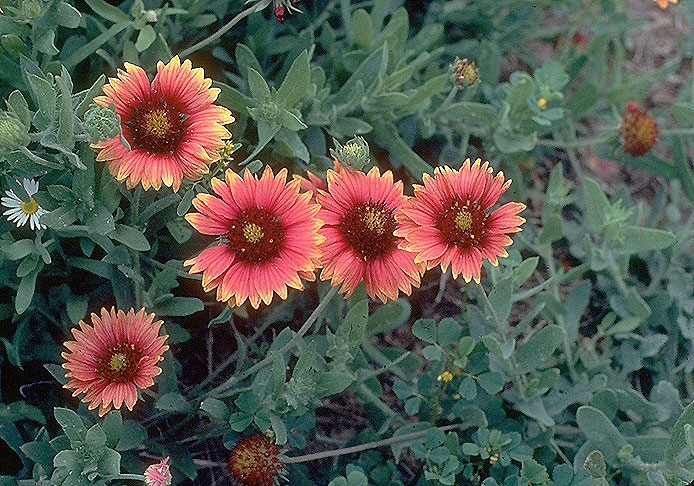
firewheel (Gaillardia pulchella)

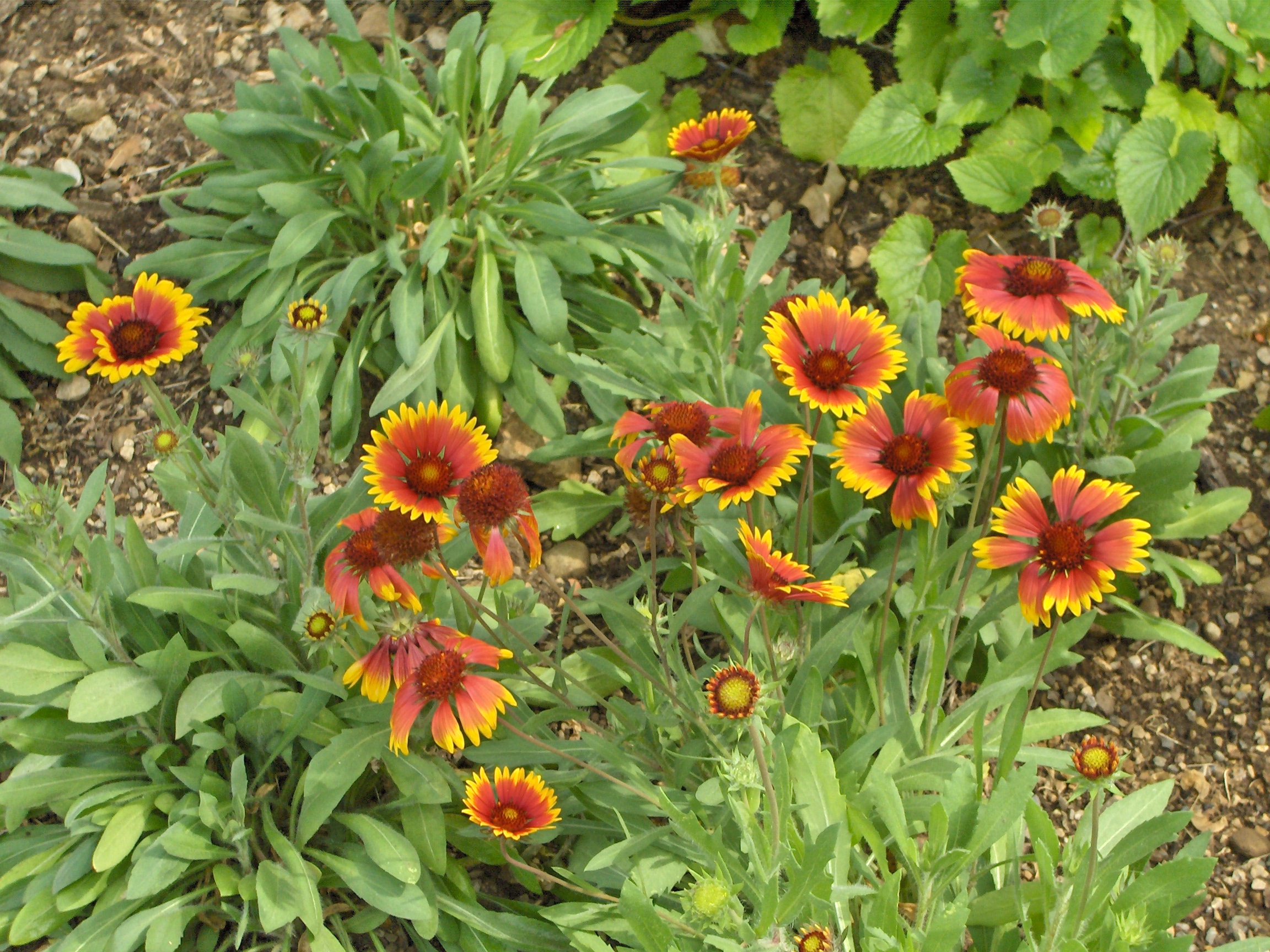
Gaillardia × hybrida 'Kobold'

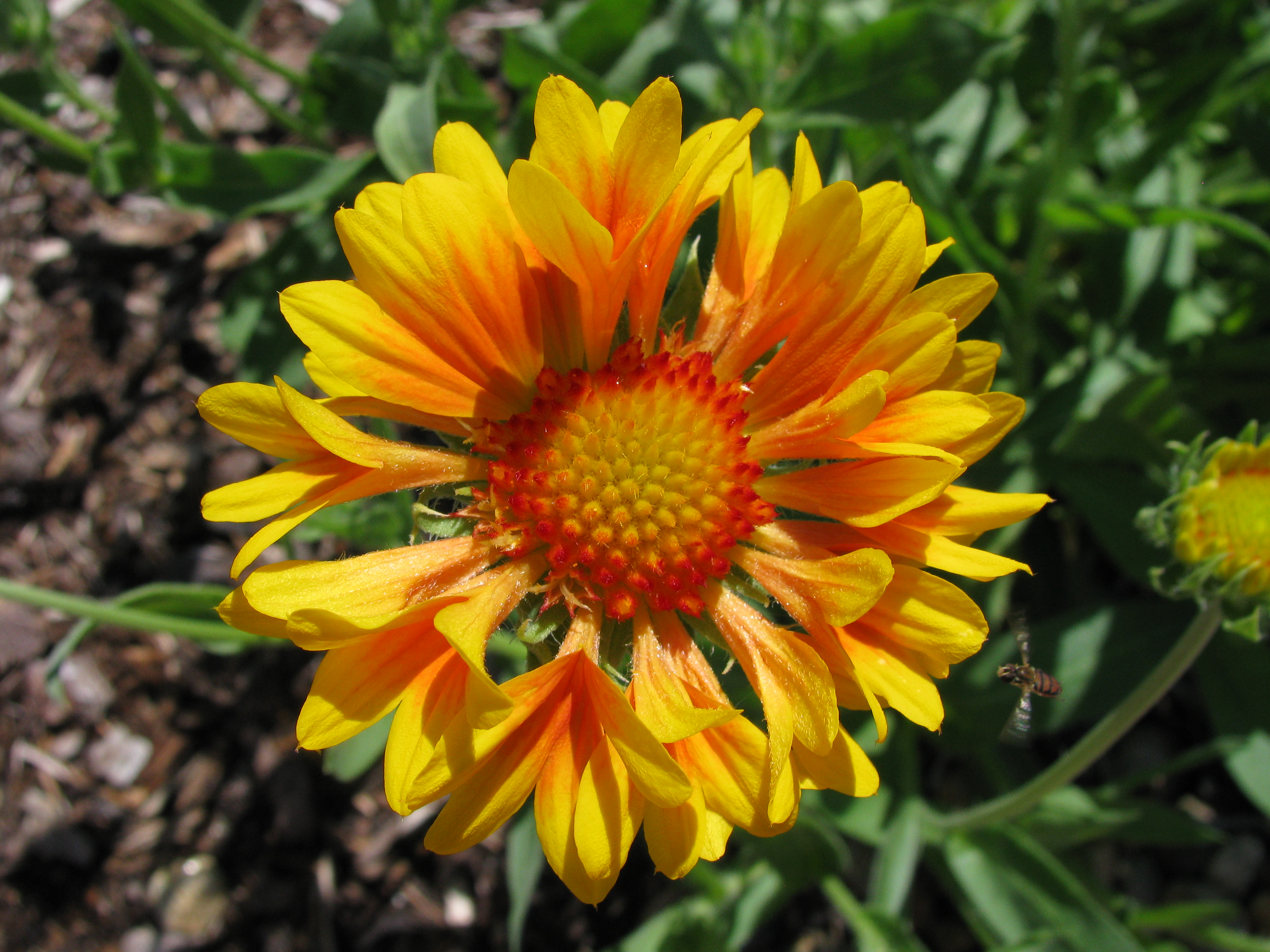
Gaillardia × grandiflora 'Oranges and Lemons'

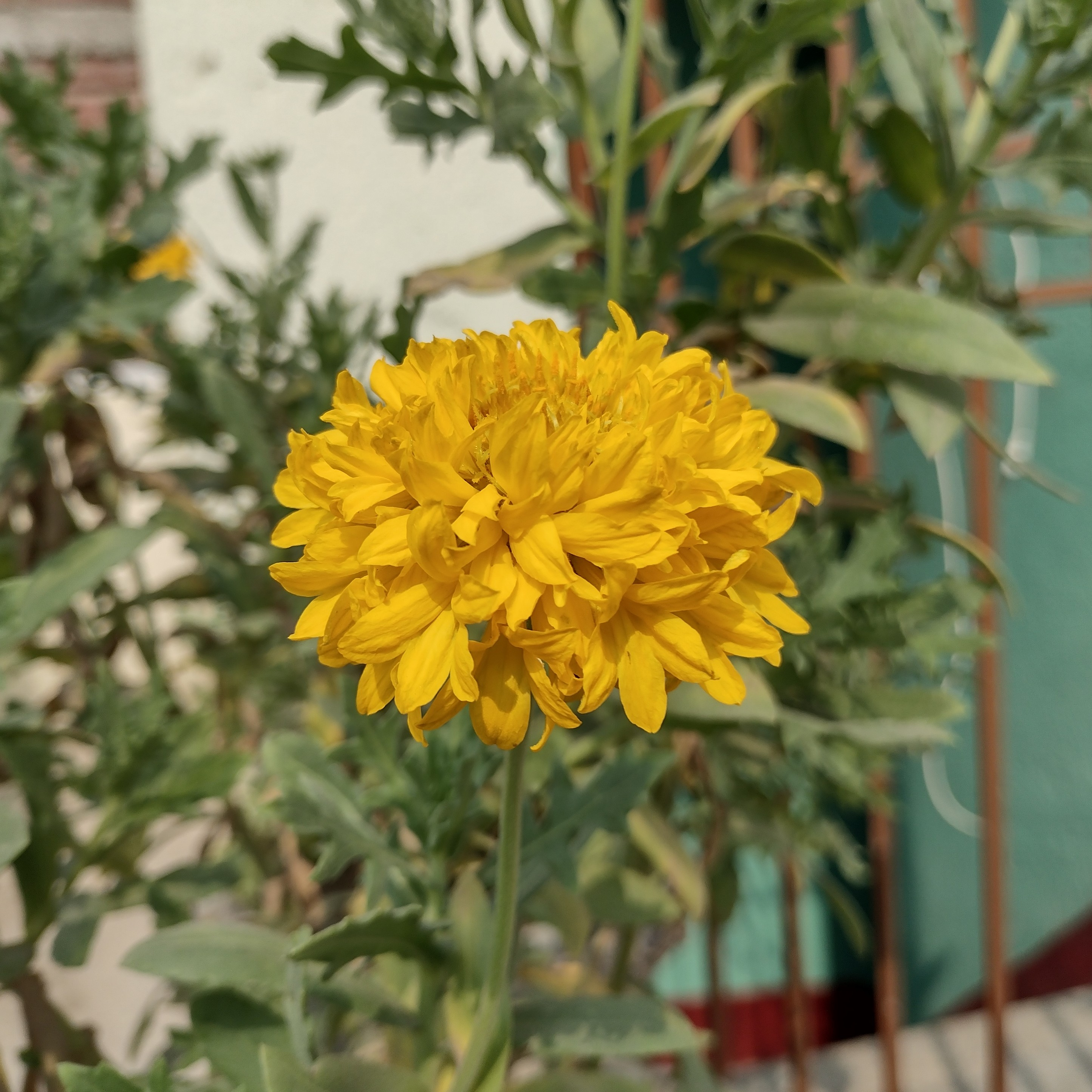

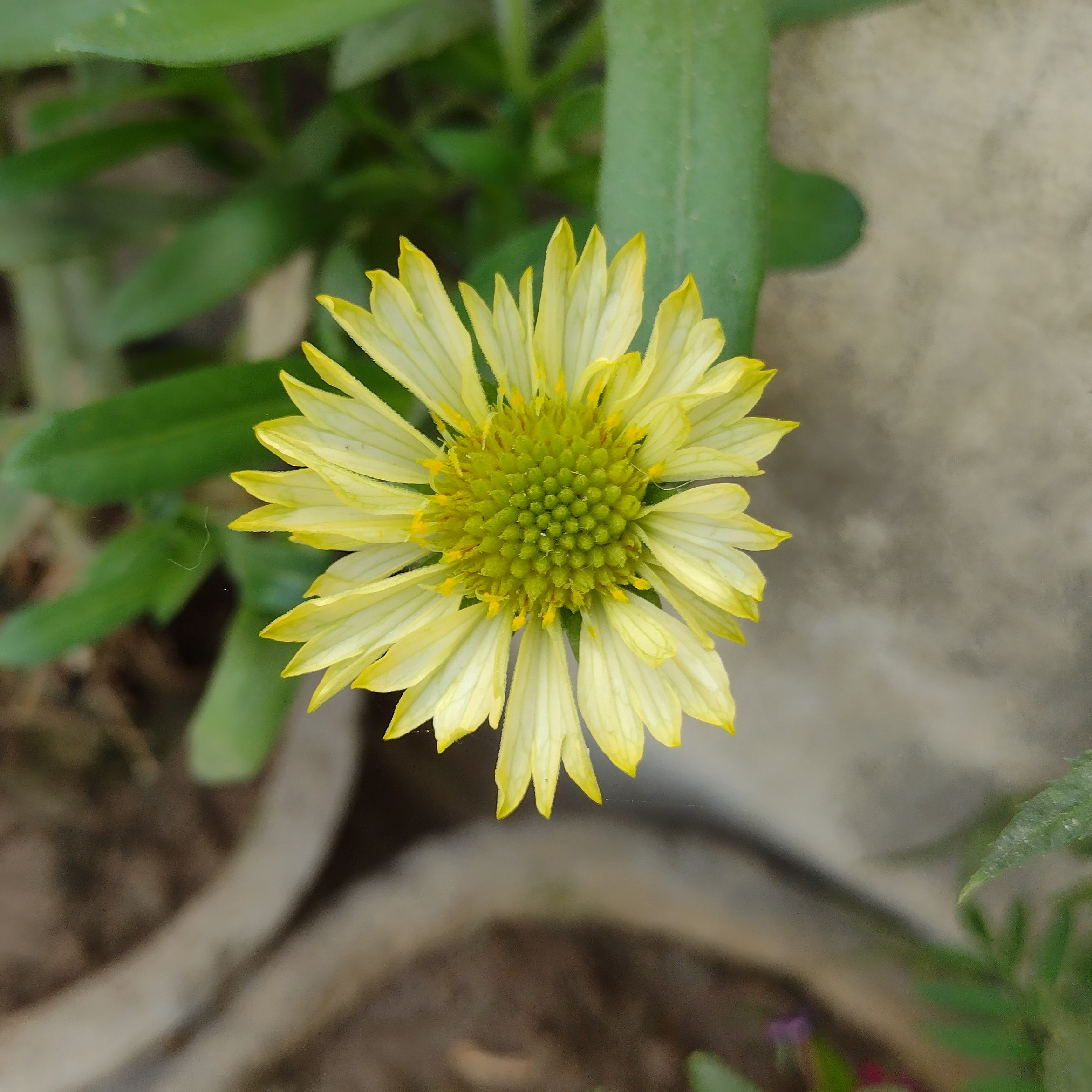
