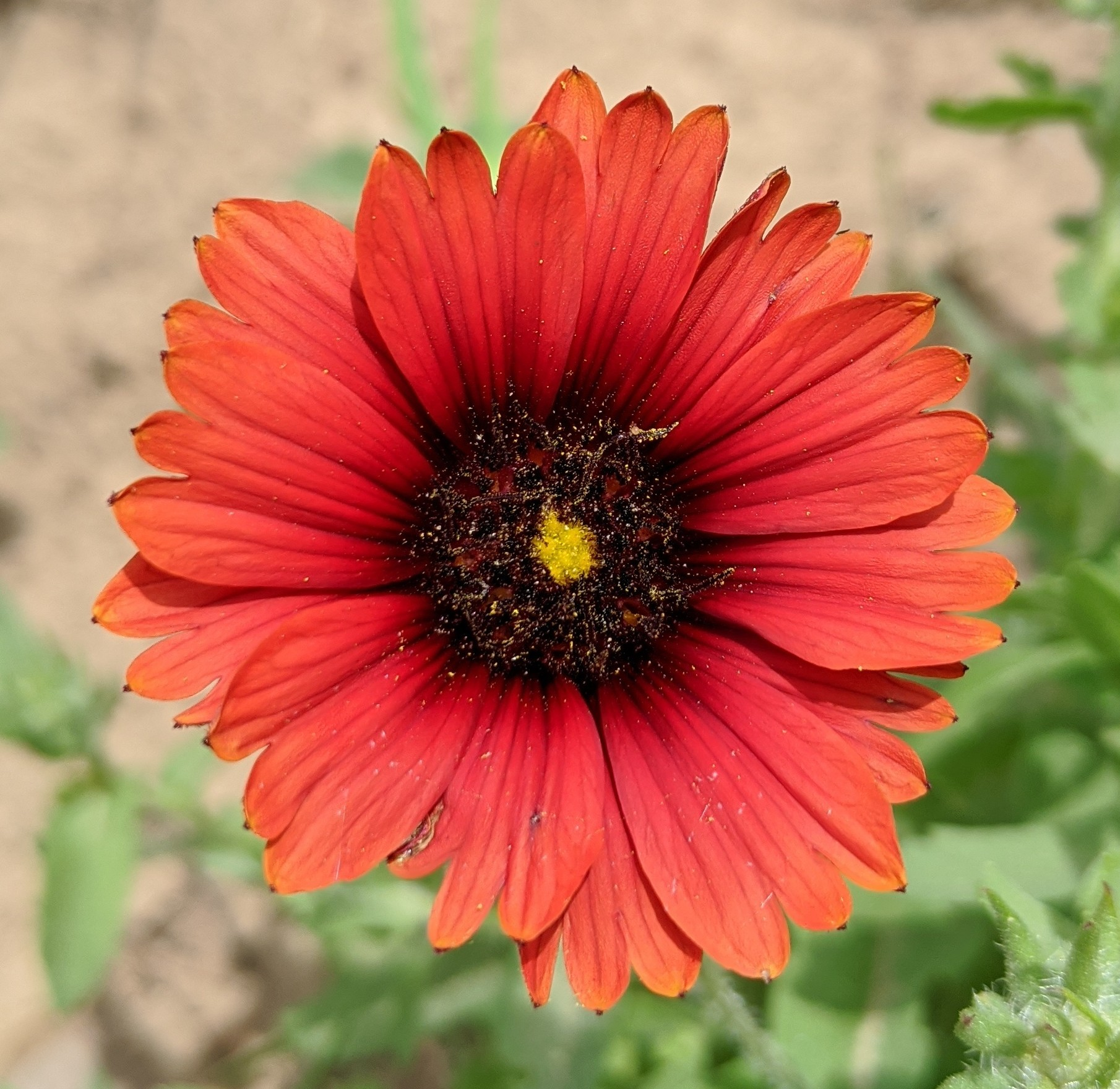

Scientific classification
- Kingdom: Plantae
- Clade: Tracheophytes
- Clade: Angiosperms
- Clade: Eudicots
- Clade: Asterids
- Order: Asterales
- Family: Asteraceae
- Genus: Gaillardia
- Species: G. amblyodon

Binomial name
- Gaillardia amblyodon J.Gay 1839

= Gaillardia amblyodon =

Species of flowering plant

Gaillardia amblyodon, the lanceleaf blanketflower or maroon blanketflower, is a species of flowering plant in the aster family. It has been found only in the state of Texas in the south-central United States.

Gaillardia amblyodon grows in open, sunlit locations on sandy soils. It is an annual herb up to 45 cm (18 in) tall with leafy stems. Each flower head is on its own flower stalk up to 15 cm (5.9 in) long. Each head has 8-12 red or purple (rarely yellow) ray flowers surrounding 30-60 disc flowers (yellow with purple tips). The species appears to be closely related to the more widespread G. pulchella.
