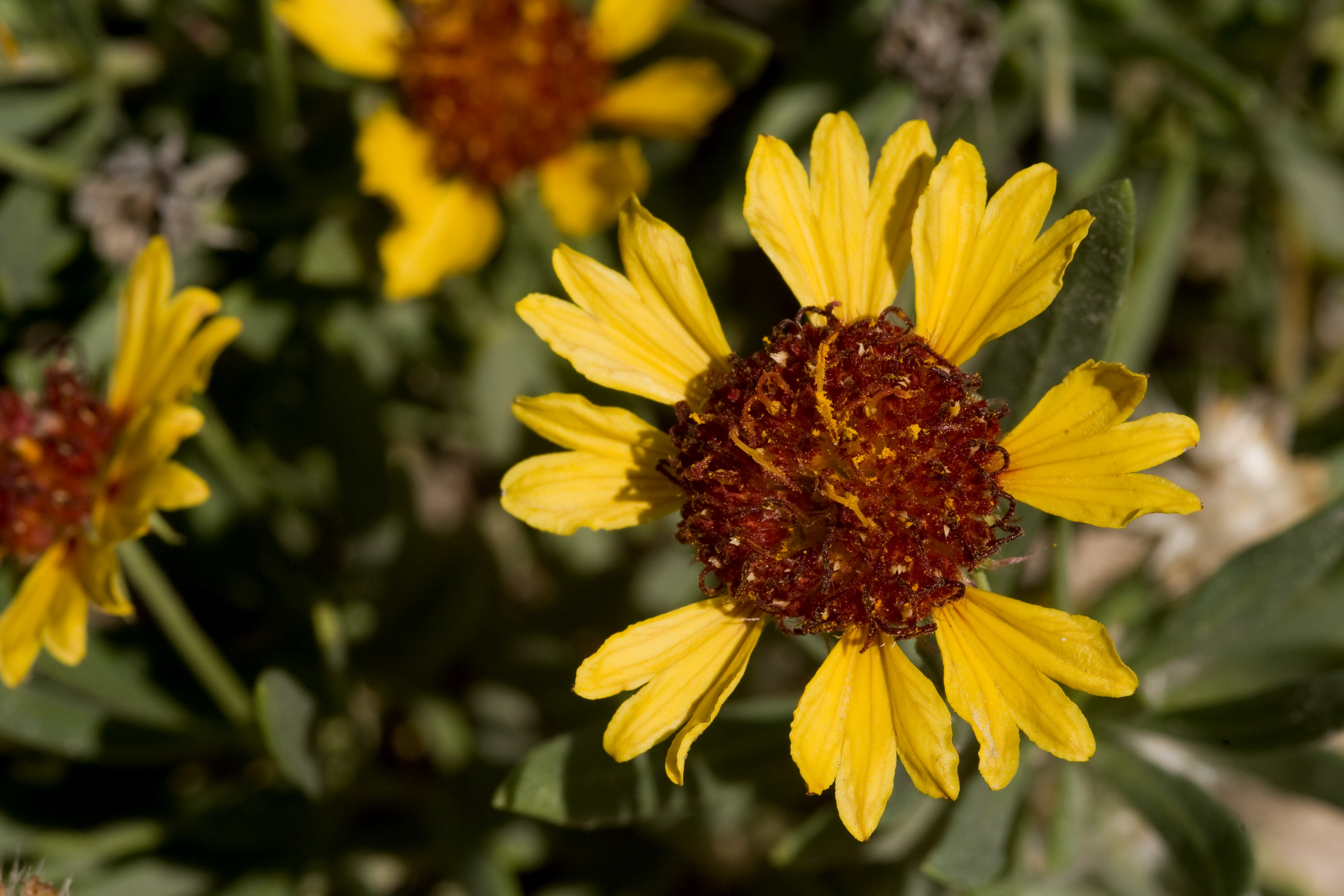

Conservation status
- Vulnerable (NatureServe)

Scientific classification
- Kingdom: Plantae
- Clade: Tracheophytes
- Clade: Angiosperms
- Clade: Eudicots
- Clade: Asterids
- Order: Asterales
- Family: Asteraceae
- Genus: Gaillardia
- Species: G. multiceps

Binomial name
- Gaillardia multiceps Greene 1897

Synonyms
- Gaillardia multiceps var. microcephala B.L.Turner

= Gaillardia multiceps =

Species of flowering plant

Gaillardia multiceps, the onion blanketflower, is a North American species of flowering plant in the sunflower family. It is native to the southwestern United States (Arizona, New Mexico, western Texas).

Gaillardia multiceps grows in gypseous soils, including sand dunes. It is a perennial herb or subshrub up to 45 cm (18 in) tall, with leaves on the stem rather than clustered around the base. Each flower head is on its own flower stalk up to 55 cm (22 in) long. Each head has 8 red ray flowers surrounding 80-100 disc flowers, yellow with purple tips.
