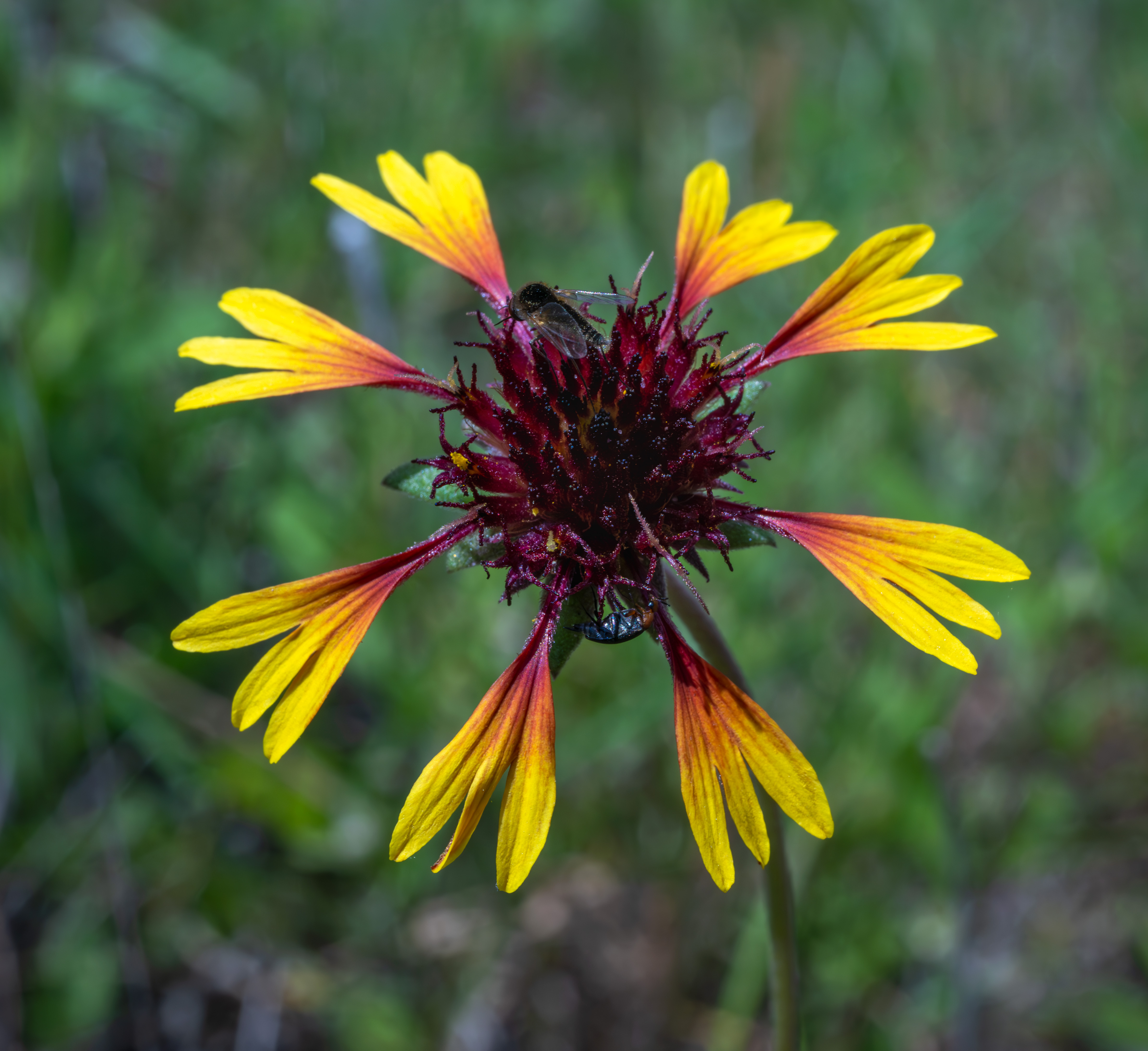

Conservation status
- Secure (NatureServe)

Scientific classification
- Kingdom: Plantae
- Clade: Tracheophytes
- Clade: Angiosperms
- Clade: Eudicots
- Clade: Asterids
- Order: Asterales
- Family: Asteraceae
- Genus: Gaillardia
- Species: G. aestivalis

Binomial name
- Gaillardia aestivalis (Walter) H.Rock

Synonyms
- Synonymy: Helenium aestivale Walter; Gaillardia aestivale (Walter) H.Rock; Gaillardia bicolor Elliott; Gaillardia chrysantha Small; Gaillardia fastigiata Greene; Gaillardia lanceolata Michx.; Gaillardia lutea Greene; Gaillardia rigida Small ex Rydb.

= Gaillardia aestivalis =

Species of flowering plant

Gaillardia aestivalis is a species of flowering plant in the aster family known by the common names lanceleaf blanketflower, prairie gaillardia, and sandhills gaillardia. It is native to the south-central and southern United States from Texas east to Florida and north to the Carolinas, Arkansas, and Kansas. There are also reports of historical (now extirpated) populations in Missouri and introduced populations in Nebraska. It is also cultivated as an ornamental plant.

Gaillardia aestivalis is a perennial herb, sometimes growing from a rhizome, reaching maximum heights around 60 centimeters (2 feet) or more. The leaves are borne alternately along the stem. They are variable in shape and up to 6 centimeters (2.4 inches) long. The ones toward the top may clasp the stem at their bases. The flower heads are lined with several phyllaries. There are usually 6 to 12 ray florets, sometimes up to 15, but sometimes none. These are variable in color, being purplish, yellowish, or whitish. There are many disc florets at the center, also variable in color, especially across the varieties. The fruit is an achene which may be up to a centimeter (0.4 inches) long, including its pappus of scales.

There are three varieties of this plant. The rare var. winkleri (Winkler's blanketflower or white fire-wheel) is endemic to the Pineywoods of Texas.
