= Gaillardia arizonica =

Conservation status
- Apparently Secure (NatureServe)

Scientific classification
- Kingdom: Plantae
- Clade: Tracheophytes
- Clade: Angiosperms
- Clade: Eudicots
- Clade: Asterids
- Order: Asterales
- Family: Asteraceae
- Genus: Gaillardia
- Species: G. arizonica

Binomial name
- Gaillardia arizonica A.Gray 1884

Synonyms
- Gaillardia crinita Rydb.; Gaillardia pedunculata A.Nelson; Gaillardia pringlei Rydb.

Species of flowering plant

Gaillardia arizonica, the Arizonia blanketflower, is a species of flowering plant in the sunflower family. It is native to northwestern Mexico (Sonora) and the southwestern United States (Arizona, southern Nevada, southern Utah).

Gaillardia arizonica grows in sandy washes and alluvial deposits in desert regions. It is an annual herb, growing up to 40 cm (16 in) tall, and with leaves mostly crowding around its base. Each flower head is on its own flower stalk up to 35 cm (14 in) long. Each head has 10–16 yellow or orange ray flowers surrounding 40–100 yellow disc flowers.
