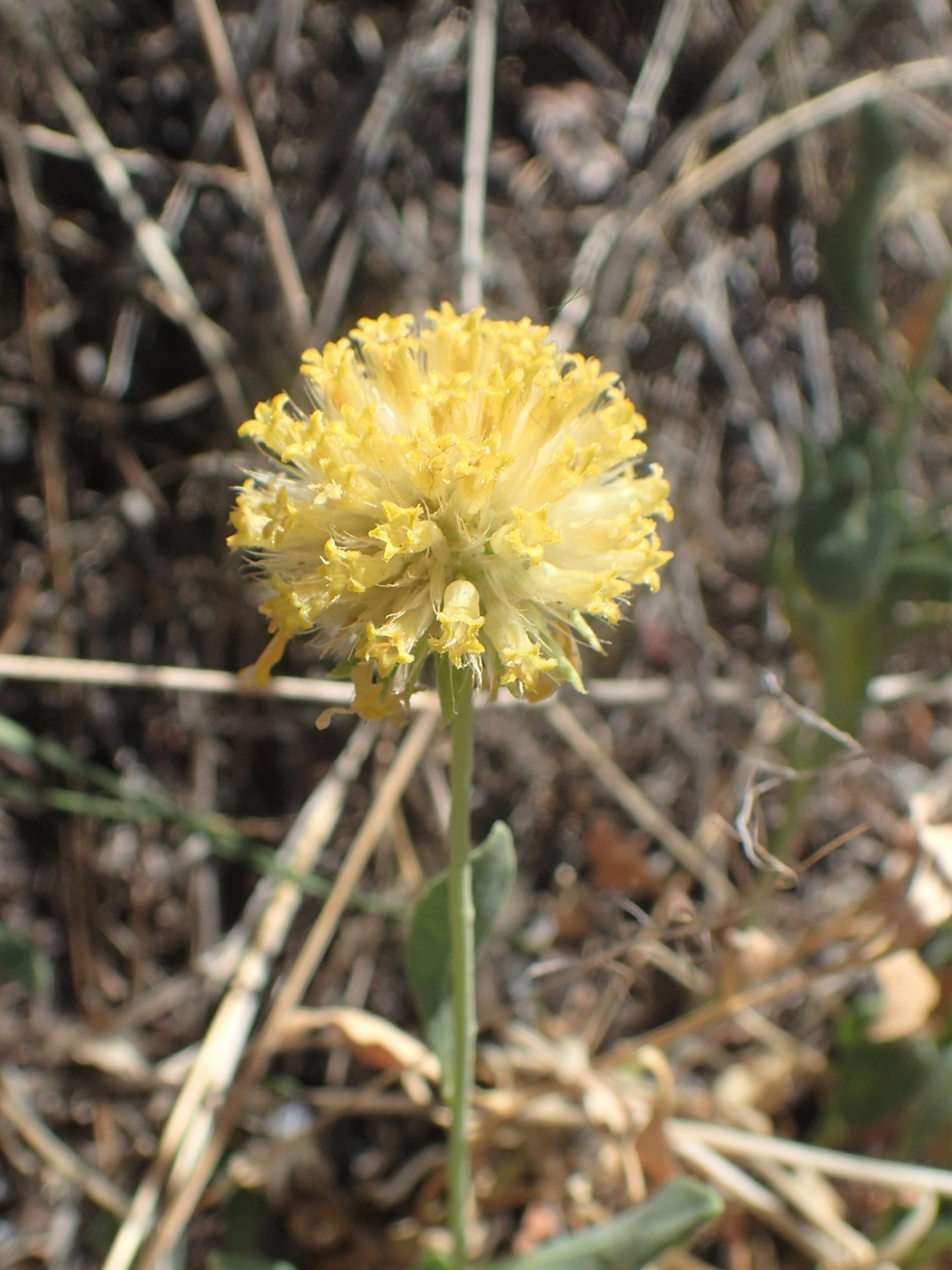

Conservation status
- Apparently Secure (NatureServe)

Scientific classification
- Kingdom: Plantae
- Clade: Tracheophytes
- Clade: Angiosperms
- Clade: Eudicots
- Clade: Asterids
- Order: Asterales
- Family: Asteraceae
- Genus: Gaillardia
- Species: G. spathulata

Binomial name
- Gaillardia spathulata A.Gray 1877

= Gaillardia spathulata =

Species of flowering plant

Gaillardia spathulata, the western blanketflower, is a species of flowering plant in the sunflower family. It is native to the western United States (Utah, western Colorado, and northwestern Arizona, with an isolated population reported from central Kansas).

Gaillardia spathulata grows in clay sandy washes often in desert regions. It is an annual herb up to 35 cm (14 in) tall, with leaves on the stem rather than crowded around the base. Each flower head is on its own flower stalk up to 10 cm (3.9 in) long. Each head has 7-10 yellow ray flowers surrounding 60-100 yellow disc flowers.
