= Gaillardia serotina =

Scientific classification
- Kingdom: Plantae
- Clade: Tracheophytes
- Clade: Angiosperms
- Clade: Eudicots
- Clade: Asterids
- Order: Asterales
- Family: Asteraceae
- Genus: Gaillardia
- Species: G. serotina

Binomial name
- Gaillardia serotina (Walter) H.Rock 1956

Synonyms
- Gaillardia serotinum (Walter) H.Rock; Helenium serotinum Walter 1788

Species of flowering plant

Gaillardia serotina is a North American species of flowering plant in the sunflower family. It is native to the southeastern United States. Flower heads are yellow, each with 12 ray flowers. Leaves are sessile (lacking a petiole), and with teeth along the edges.
