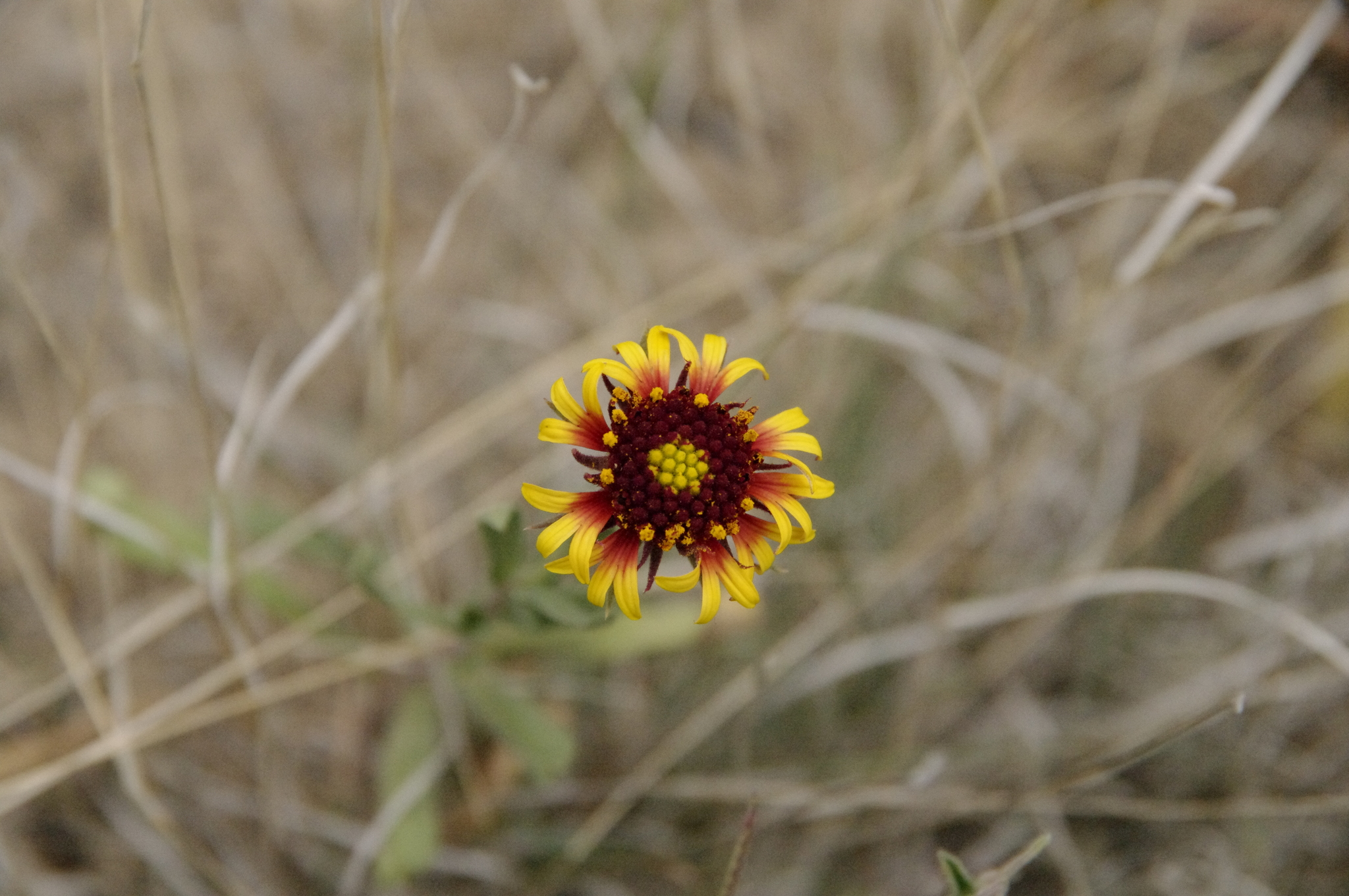

Scientific classification
- Kingdom: Plantae
- Clade: Tracheophytes
- Clade: Angiosperms
- Clade: Eudicots
- Clade: Asterids
- Order: Asterales
- Family: Asteraceae
- Genus: Gaillardia
- Species: G. coahuilensis

Binomial name
- Gaillardia coahuilensis B.L.Turner

= Gaillardia coahuilensis =

Species of plant

Gaillardia coahuilensis, the bandanna daisy, is a North American species of flowering plant in the sunflower family. It is native to northwestern Mexico (Coahuila) and the southwestern United States (western Texas).

Gaillardia coahuilensis grows in calcareous soils. It is an annual herb up to 20 cm (7.9 in) tall, with leaves at the base and also higher on the stem. Each flower head is on its own flower stalk up to 35 cm (14 in) long. Each head has 5-10 2-colored ray flowers (red, yellow, or orange close to the center of the head, orange or yellow further away from the center). These surround 40-100 yellow or reddish disc flowers.
