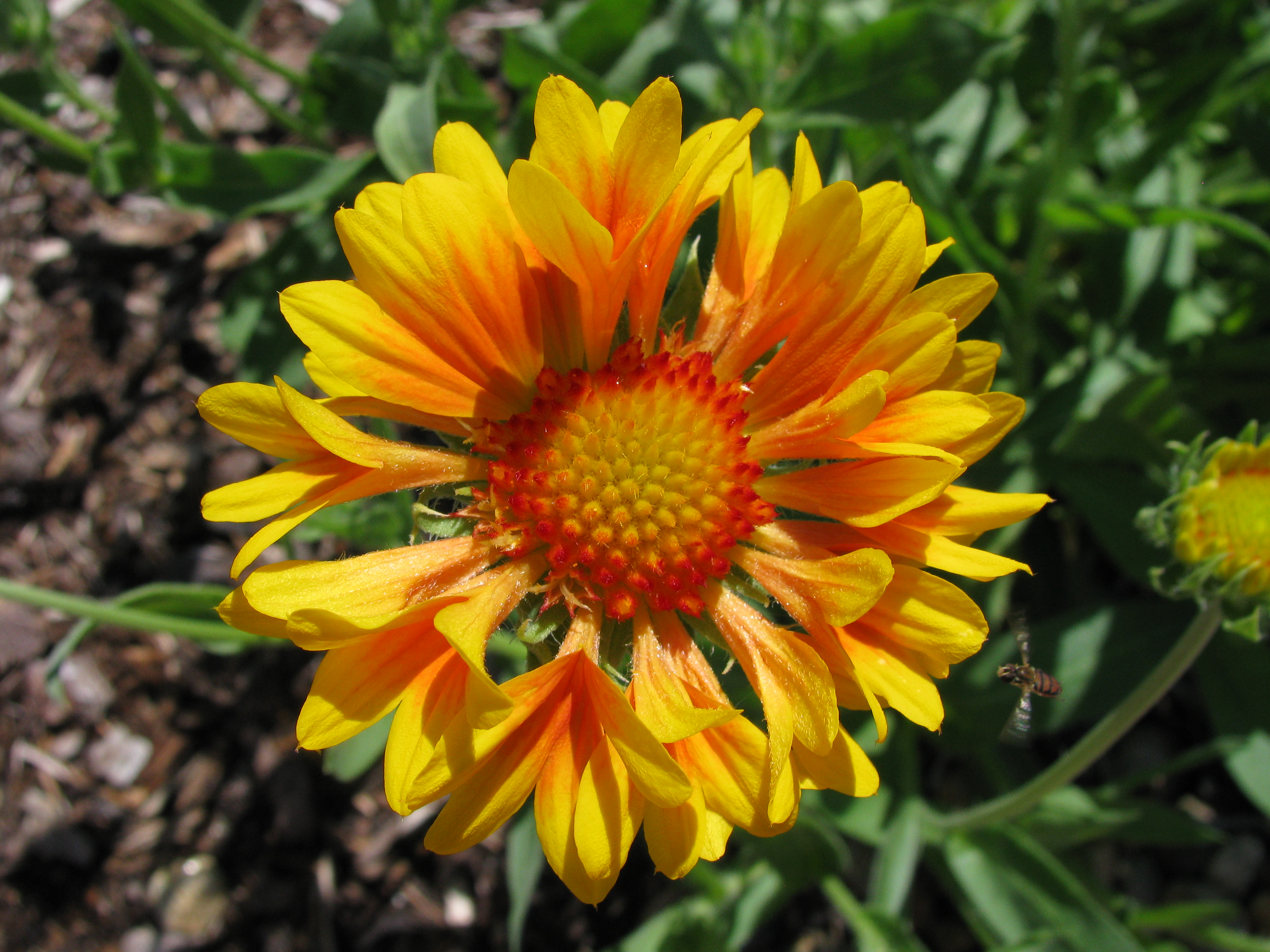
- cv. 'Oranges and Lemons'

Scientific classification
- Kingdom: Plantae
- Clade: Tracheophytes
- Clade: Angiosperms
- Clade: Eudicots
- Clade: Asterids
- Order: Asterales
- Family: Asteraceae
- Genus: Gaillardia
- Species: G. × grandiflora

Binomial name
- Gaillardia × grandiflora hort.

= Gaillardia × grandiflora =

Hybrid species of flowering plant

Gaillardia × grandiflora, known as blanket flower, is a hybrid species of flowering plant in the sunflower family Asteraceae, which is a cross of garden origin between G. aristata × G. pulchella.

== Description ==
This herbaceous perennial and its cultivars are valued for their large ornamental blooms in summer and autumn. 'Dazzler', with orange flowers tipped with yellow, grows to 1 m (3.3 ft) tall by 50 cm (20 in) broad.

== Cultivation ==
It is usually grown as a half-hardy annual, especially in cooler climates. It has won the Royal Horticultural Society's Award of Garden Merit.

Several other cultivars exist, in the same range of colours (red, orange and yellow).
