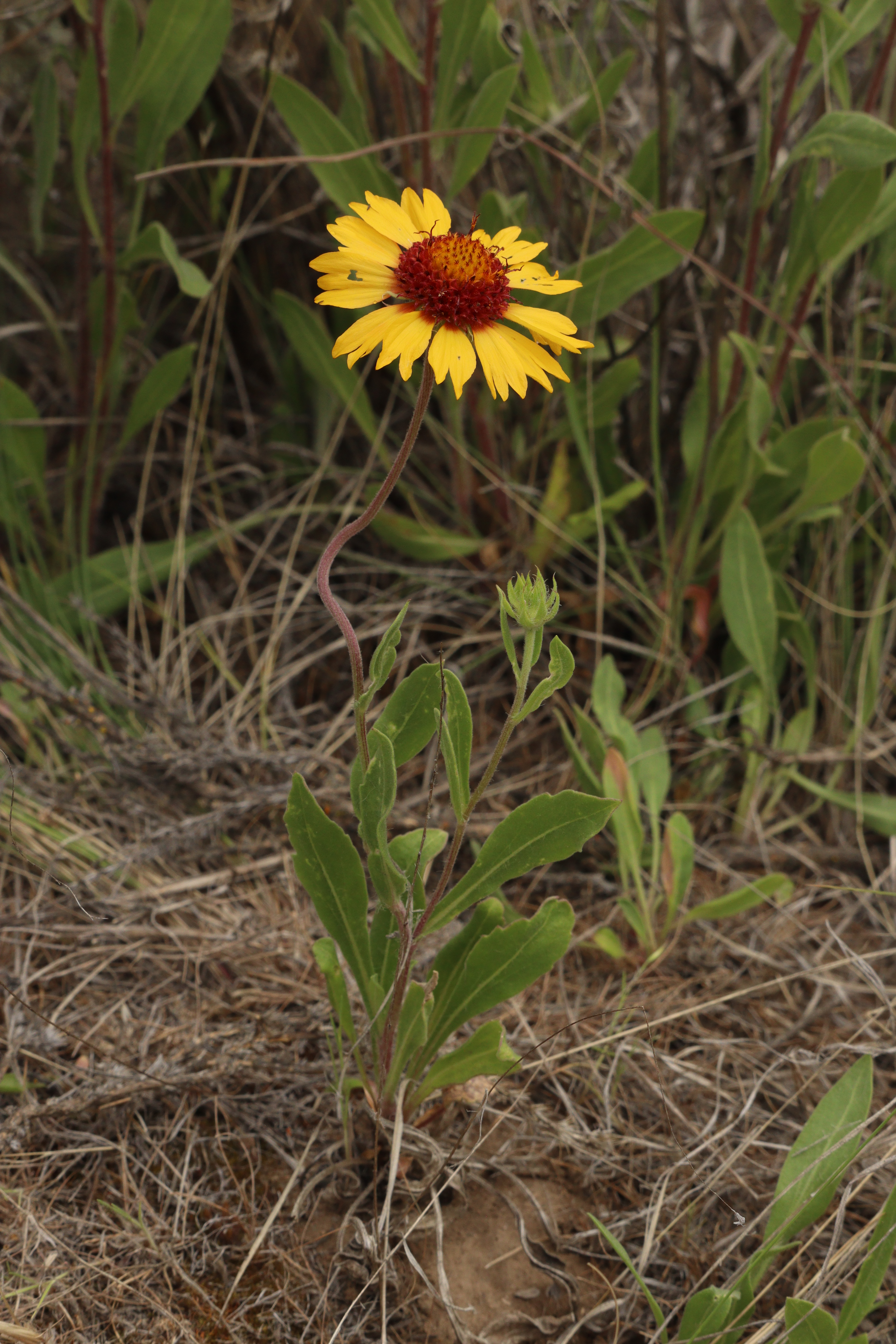

Conservation status
- Secure (NatureServe)

Scientific classification
- Kingdom: Plantae
- Clade: Tracheophytes
- Clade: Angiosperms
- Clade: Eudicots
- Clade: Asterids
- Order: Asterales
- Family: Asteraceae
- Genus: Gaillardia
- Species: G. aristata

Binomial name
- Gaillardia aristata Pursh 1813

Synonyms
- Synonymy: Galardia aristata Pursh; Gaillardia bicolor var. aristata (Pursh) Nutt.; Gaillardia bicolor Pursh; Gaillardia bracteosa Standl.; Gaillardia hallii Rydb.; Gaillardia perennis Loisel.; Gaillardia richardsonii Auct.; Gaillardia roezli Regel; Gaillardia rustica Cass.; Polatherus scaber Raf.; Virgilia grandiflora Nutt.

= Gaillardia aristata =

Species of flowering plant

Ligated furrow bee (Halictus ligatus) on flower

Gaillardia aristata is a North American species of flowering plant in the sunflower family. It is known by the common names common blanketflower and common gaillardia. This perennial wildflower is native to the Great Plains and Rocky Mountains, but cultivars have been introduced in much of North America and Europe. Blanketflower is an early- to mid-successional species typically found growing alongside native grasses, sagebrush, or conifers. It is pollinated by a variety of bees and beetles, and host to Schinia masoni. Indigenous communities of the Pacific Northwest and northern plains used blanketflower as an ingredient in a variety of medicines, including those for heatstroke, headaches, and tuberculosis. The first Gaillardia aristata specimen was collected in 1806 on the Lewis and Clark expedition, and first described by Frederick Pursh in 1814.

== Etymology ==
The Latin name for the genus, Gaillardia, honors Gaillard de Charetonneau, an early French botanist. The species name, aristata, means 'bristled' in Latin, which describes the trichomes covering much of the plant.

G. aristata is known in multiple Salish dialects as 'spring salmon's eye' in reference to Chinook salmon. The Okanagan name, mitl'mn, means 'painting instrument,' a reference to the way the tribe 'painted' blanketflower on their bodies to reduce pain.

== Description ==
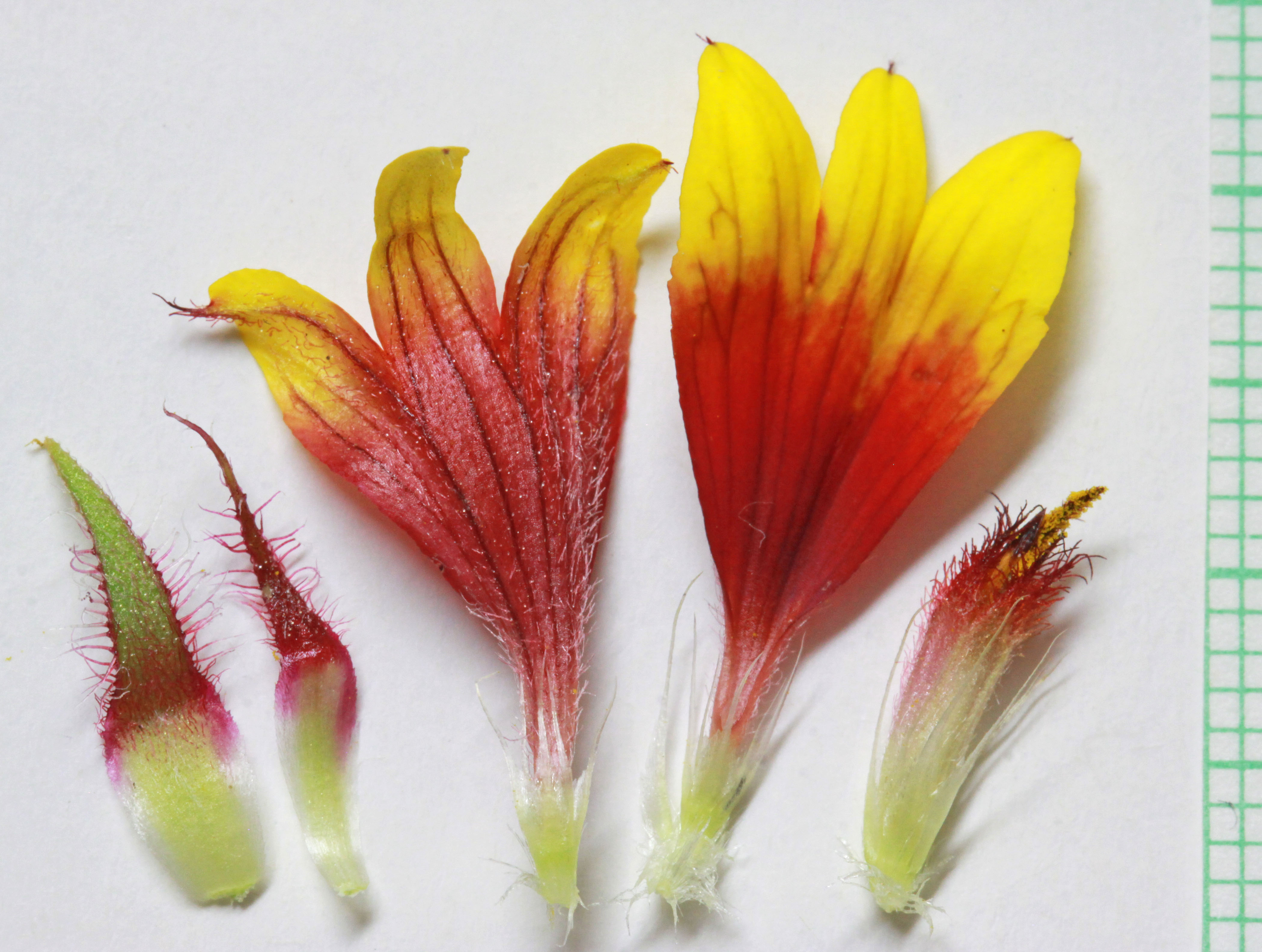
Parts of a dissected flower head: phyllaries (left), ray florets (middle), and disc florets (right)

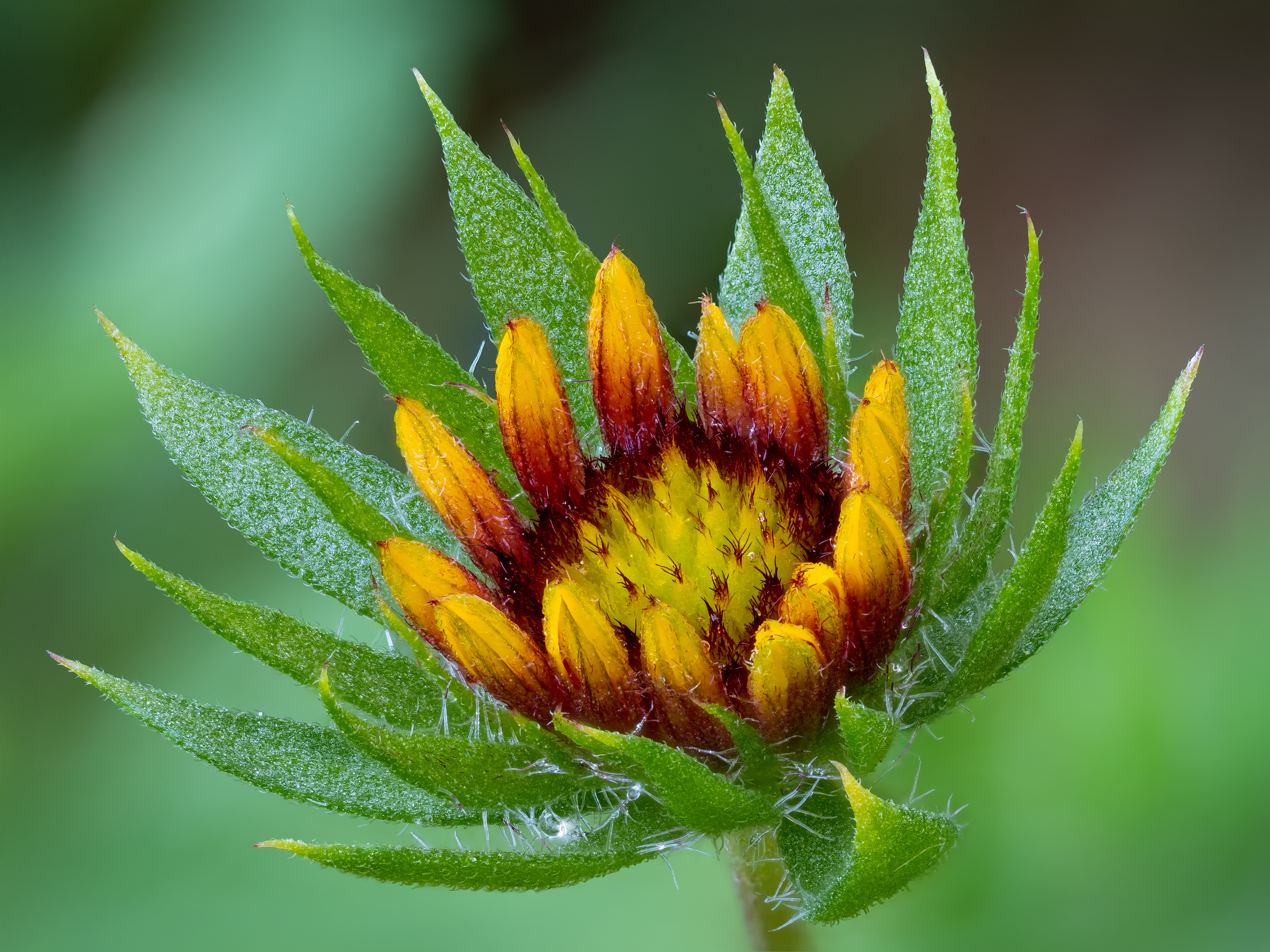
Close-up of emerging flower

Blanketflower is a perennial herb reaching maximum heights of anywhere between 20 and 80 cm (7.9 and 31.5 in). The plant forms a slender taproot and one or a few stems. Leaves typically extend about halfway up each stem, but can be solely basal. Leaves are obolanceolate to lanceolate, 5 to 15 cm (2.0 to 5.9 inches) long, and sparsely to densely hairy. Leaf margins can be lobed, toothed, or entire. The involucre of Gaillardia aristata, which ranges from 10 to 20 mm (0.39 to 0.79 in) tall, is much larger than that of other species in the genus. Phyllaries on the involucre are 9 to 11 mm (0.35 to 0.43 in) long, ovate, and bristled.

G. aristata typically flowers between July and August. Plants may also flower a second time between September and November. Each flower head contains two types of floret: ray and disc.

Ray florets make up the margin of the flower head, and anywhere between 6 and 33 florets have been observed (though flowers generally produce between 12 and 18 florets). Ray flowers are typically flat, 3 lobed, and yellow, but can also be tubular with five lobes and/or partially purple. Ray flowers are between 10 and 35 mm (0.39 and 1.38 in) long.

Between 60 and 120 fertile disc florets occupy the center of the flower head. These 7 to 9 mm (0.28 to 0.35 in) corollas are densely hairy and are often maroon, though they can be yellow-tipped.

The fruit is a stout, hairy achene which may be over 10 mm (0.4 in) long including the long, spiky pappus. These seeds are the sole method of reproduction in G. aristata and are dispersed by gravity or potentially animal fur.

== Distribution and habitat ==
The genus, Gaillardia, originated in the Chihuahuan desert, though Gaillardia aristata moved northward following Rocky Mountain uplift. Blanketflower is native to the Rocky Mountains and the upper Great Plains, and can be found in Alberta, Arizona, British Columbia, Colorado, Idaho, Manitoba, Montana, North Dakota, Oregon, South Dakota, Saskatchewan, Utah, Washington, and Wyoming. G. aristata is introduced in California, Connecticut, Illinois, Massachusetts, Michigan, New Hampshire, New York, Northwest Territories, Ontario, Quebec, Wisconsin, and Yukon. Blanketflower has been reported throughout much of Europe, as well as Australia, Argentina, China, India, Mozambique, South Africa, and South Korea. It is considered invasive in Hungary and Russia.

G. aristata grows in many habitats, including prairies, sagebrush grasslands, and coniferous forests. Blanketflower is typically found on coarse, well-drained, loamy to sandy soils at elevations between 50 and 2,900 metres (160 and 9,510 ft). It is tolerant of drought and moderately tolerant of salinity.

== Ecology ==
Blanketflower is a fire-dependent, early- to mid-successional species. In addition to fire, it is tolerant of grazing and mechanical disturbance. Blanketflower leaves and flowers are eaten by domestic sheep, and may be part of the diets of bighorn sheep, mule deer, desert cottontail, and Richardson's ground squirrel.

Gaillardia aristata is mainly pollinated by bees, including bumblebees, leafcutter bees, and sweat bees. Butterflies, wasps, and the soft-winged flower beetle also serve as pollinators, and feed on the plant's nectar. G. aristata is the host plant of Schinia masoni, a species of flowermoth. S. masoni is maroon and yellow, allowing it to blend into G. aristata flowers when feeding and resting. S. masoni lays its eggs between disc flowers, and blanketflower seeds are eaten by larvae. Seeds are also eaten by deer mice.

== Uses ==
Some Plateau Indian tribes used blanketflower to treat wounds and settle fevers. Okanagan and Colville peoples used blanketflower to treat backaches, kidney problems, and venereal disease, while Nlaka'pamux people used it for headaches, mumps, and tuberculosis. Blackfeet people used G. aristata to treat gastroenteritis, sunstroke, and skin disorders. The plant was also used to treat horse saddle sores and to make rawhide waterproof.

== Cultivation ==
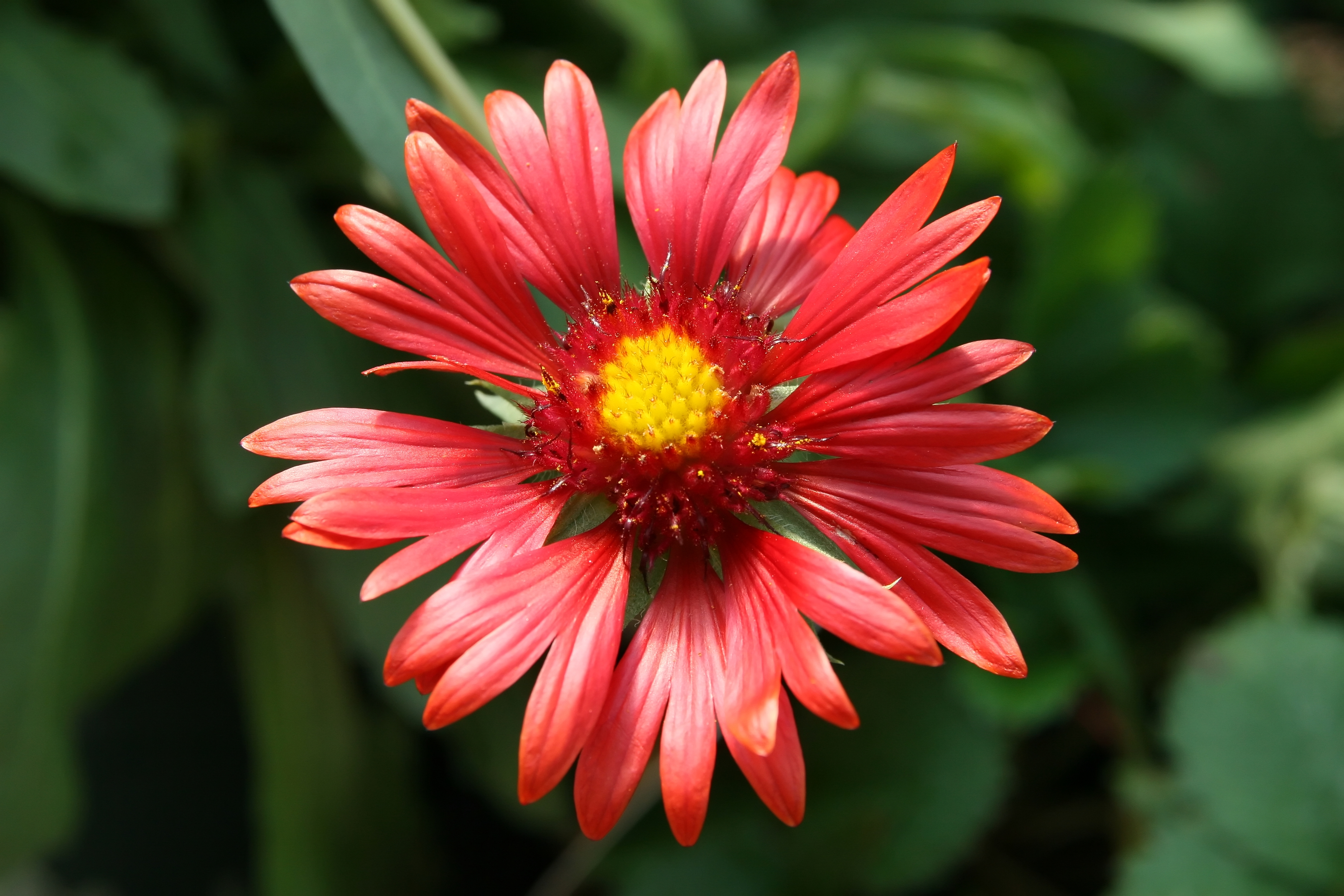
Gaillardia x grandiflora 'Burgundy'

Gaillardia aristata is a widely cultivated ornamental plant, used as a perennial garden flower. It tolerates full sun to partial shade in USDA Hardiness Zones of 2 and above. Common cultivars include 'Amber Wheels' and 'Maxima Aurea,' which have fully yellow flower heads, and the Sunrita series.

Most commercially available cultivars are hybrids of G. aristata and the closely related G. pulchella. These short-lived perennials, called Gaillardia x grandiflora Van Houtte, flower June through September and can typically tolerate USDA zones 3 to 10. Common cultivars include the Arizona series, 'Burgundy,' 'Goblin,' 'Oranges and Lemons,' and the Sunset series.
