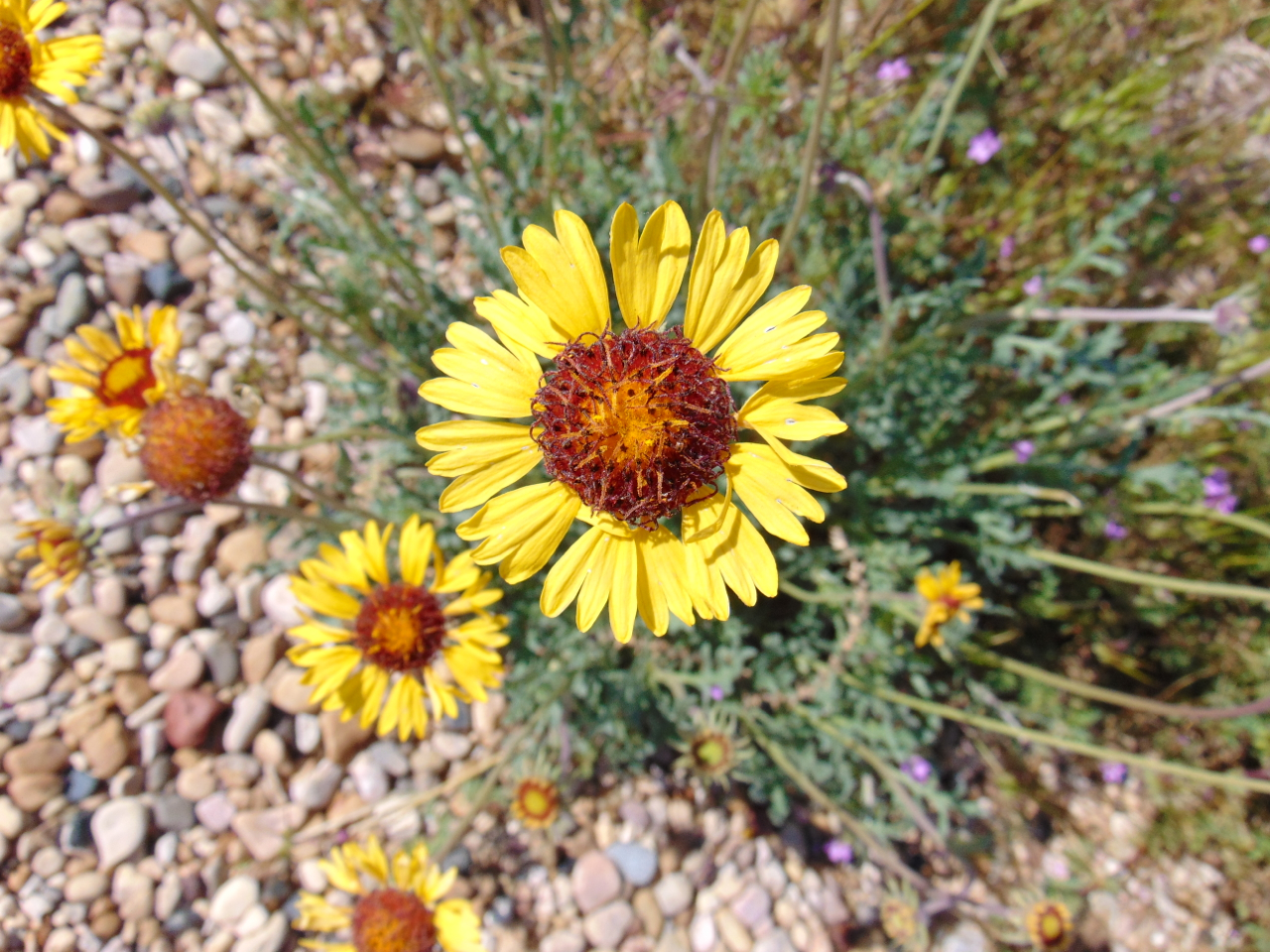

Conservation status
- Secure (NatureServe)

Scientific classification
- Kingdom: Plantae
- Clade: Tracheophytes
- Clade: Angiosperms
- Clade: Eudicots
- Clade: Asterids
- Order: Asterales
- Family: Asteraceae
- Genus: Gaillardia
- Species: G. pinnatifida

Binomial name
- Gaillardia pinnatifida Torr. 1827

Synonyms
- Synonymy: Gaillardia crassa Rydb.; Gaillardia crassifolia A.Nelson & J.F.Macbr.; Gaillardia flava Rydb.; Gaillardia globosa A.Nelson; Gaillardia gracilis A.Nelson; Gaillardia linearis Rydb.; Gaillardia mearnsii Rydb.; Gaillardia pinnatifida var. linearis (Rydb.) Biddulph; Gaillardia straminea A.Nelson

= Gaillardia pinnatifida =

Species of flowering plant

Gaillardia pinnatifida, the Hopi blanketflower or red dome blanketflower, is a perennial plant in the family Asteraceae found in northern Mexico (Chihuahua, Coahuila, Durango, Sonora) and in the south-central and southwestern United States (from southwestern Kansas south to central Texas and west as far as southern Nevada).

== Description ==
Gaillardia pinnatifida is a perennial growing to 22 inches (56 cm) with hairy, wavy to lobed leaves up to 3 inches (7.6 cm) long, growing to halfway up the stem, with a solitary flower head on top having 7-12 yellow ray flowers and numerous densely packed orange-brown to purple disk flowers. The ray flowers are three-lobed, often deeply.

Gaillardia pinnatifida displays considerable variation across its range, so much so that some authors have divided G. pinnatifida into varieties or distinct species. These taxa intergrade with each other, so Flora of North America and the Kew Garden Plant List does not recognise any of these as separate taxa. Many populations in Arizona have unlobed leaves, unlike the deeply divided leaves farther to the north, and populations in Utah have yellow rather than brown or purple disc flowers, as well as gland-dots in the leaves.

== Habitat ==
Gaillardia pinnatifida can be found in blackbush scrub, mixed shrub-grasslands, and pinyon–juniper woodland communities.
