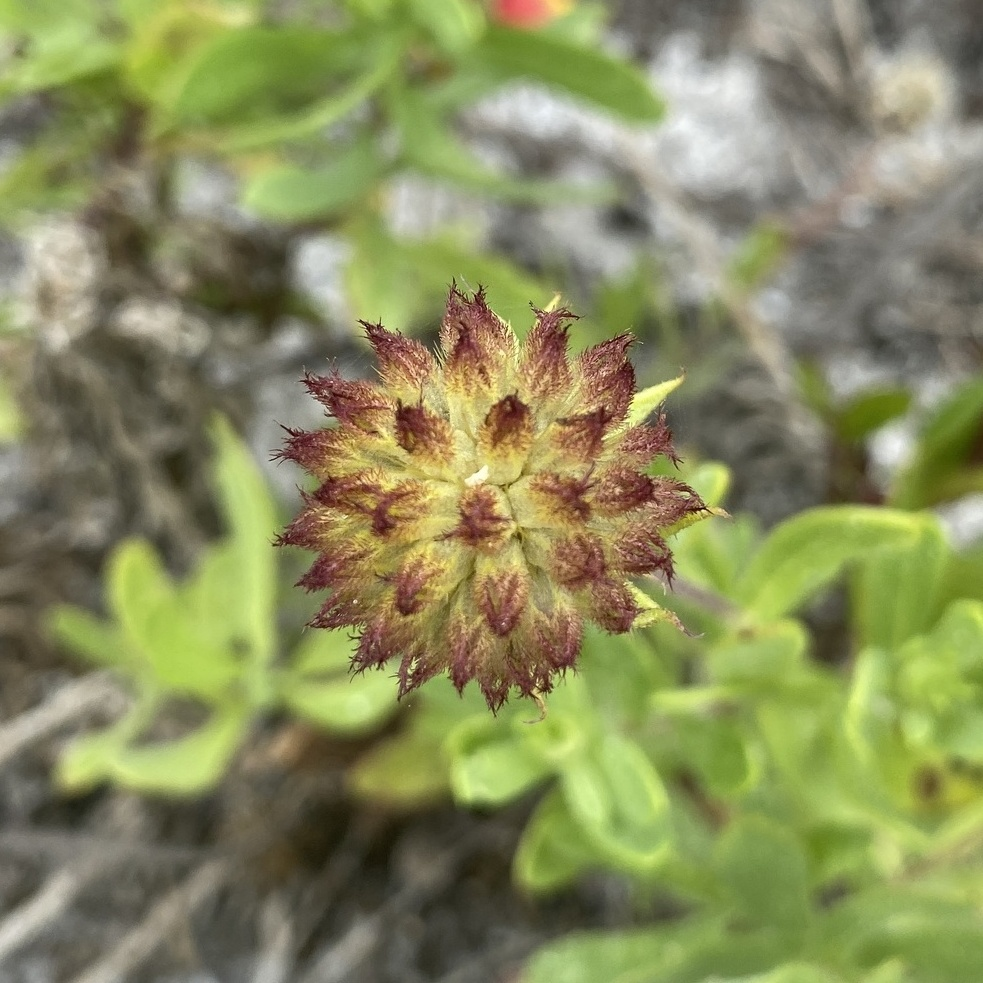

Scientific classification
- Kingdom: Plantae
- Clade: Tracheophytes
- Clade: Angiosperms
- Clade: Eudicots
- Clade: Asterids
- Order: Asterales
- Family: Asteraceae
- Genus: Gaillardia
- Species: G. suavis

Binomial name
- Gaillardia suavis (A.Gray & Engelm.) Britton & Rusby 1887

Synonyms
- Agassizia suavis A.Gray & Engelm.; Gaillardia odorata Lindh. ex A.Gray; Gaillardia simplex Scheele; Gaillardia trinervata Small; Gaillardia tuberculata Scheele

= Gaillardia suavis =

Species of flowering plant

Gaillardia suavis is a species of flowering plant in the family Asteraceae, common names pincushion daisy and perfumeballs. It is native to northern Mexico (Coahuila, Nuevo León, Tamaulipas) and the southern Great Plains of the United States (Kansas, Oklahoma, Texas).

Gaillardia suavis grows in limestone or sandy soils in prairies, desert scrub, or open juniper woodlands. It is a perennial herb up to 80 cm (31 in) tall, with leaves crowded around the base rather than borne on the stem. Each flower head is on its own flower stalk up to 75 cm (30 in) long. Each head generally has 7-10 red or purple ray flowers, though some heads have no ray flowers. The center of the head has 40-100 pink or purple disc flowers.
