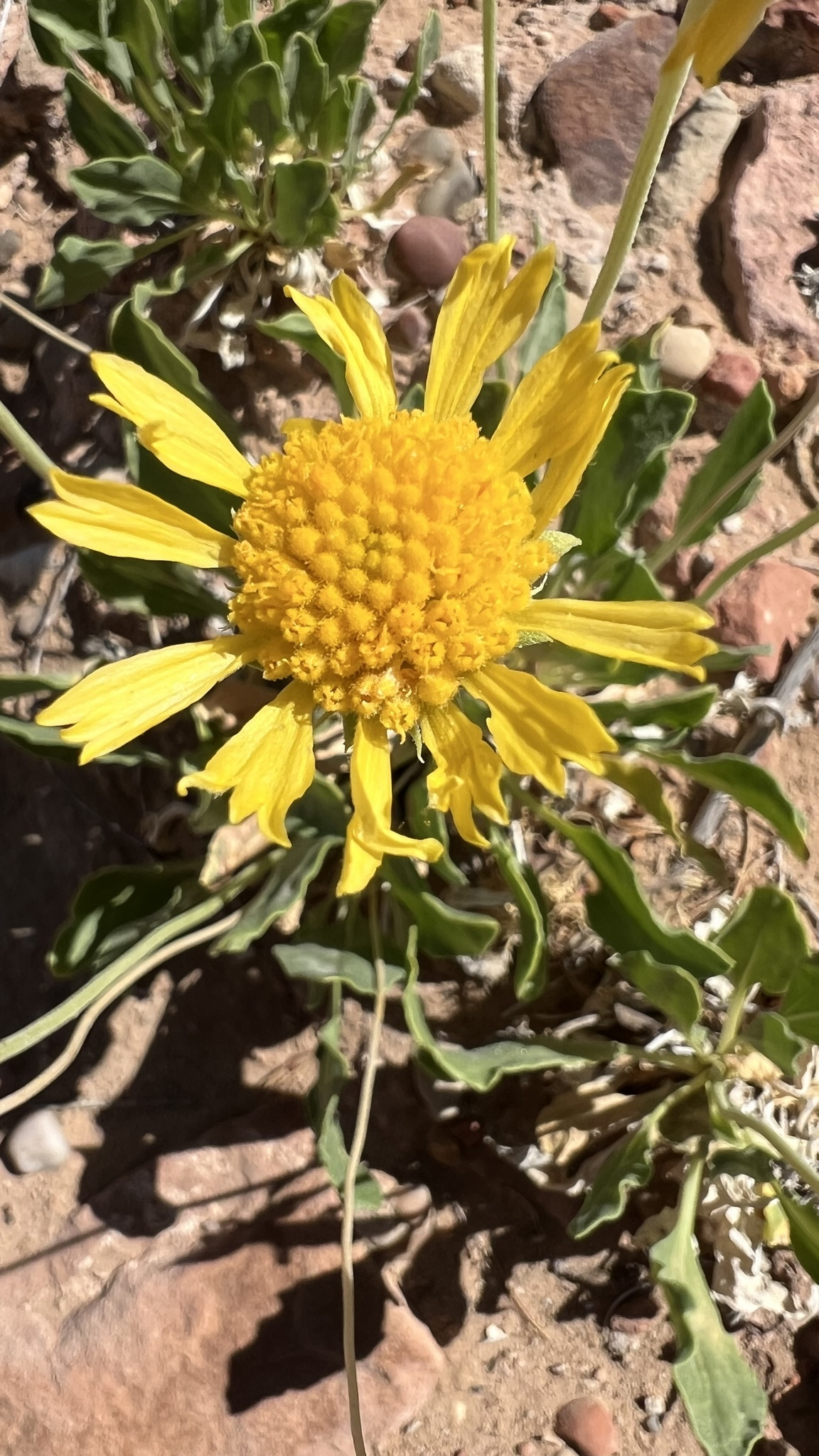

Scientific classification
- Kingdom: Plantae
- Clade: Tracheophytes
- Clade: Angiosperms
- Clade: Eudicots
- Clade: Asterids
- Order: Asterales
- Family: Asteraceae
- Genus: Gaillardia
- Species: G. parryi

Binomial name
- Gaillardia parryi Greene 1897

Synonyms
- Gaillardia acaulis A.Gray 1874, illegitimate homonym not Pursh 1813

= Gaillardia parryi =

Species of flowering plant

Gaillardia parryi, or Parry's blanketflower, is a North American species of flowering plant in the sunflower family. It is native to the southwestern United States (Arizona and Utah). Some of the populations are inside Grand Canyon National Park, others in Grand Staircase–Escalante National Monument.

Gaillardia parryi grows in clay or sandy soils in places dominated by sagebrush, pinyon pine, or yellow pine. It is a perennial herb up to 35 cm (14 in) tall, with most of the leaves clustered around the base. Each flower head is on its own flower stalk up to 30 cm (12 in) long. Each head has 8-14 yellow ray flowers surrounding sometimes as many as 100 yellow disc flowers.
