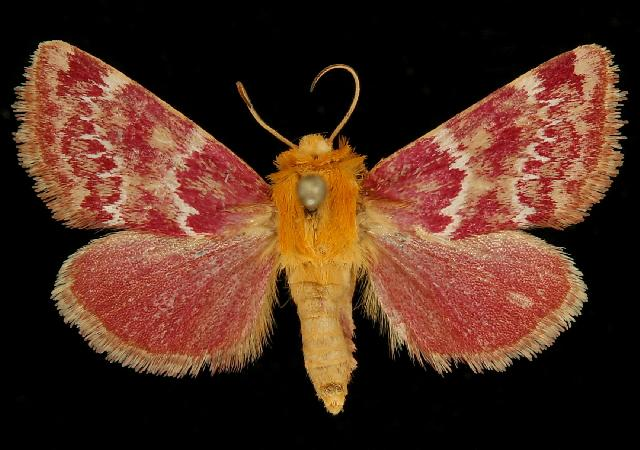

Scientific classification
- Domain: Eukaryota
- Kingdom: Animalia
- Phylum: Arthropoda
- Class: Insecta
- Order: Lepidoptera
- Superfamily: Noctuoidea
- Family: Noctuidae
- Genus: Schinia
- Species: S. volupia

Binomial name
- Schinia volupia Fitch, 1868

= Schinia volupia =

Species of moth

The painted schinia moth (Schinia volupia) is a moth of the family Noctuidae. It is found in North America, including Arizona, New Mexico, Kansas, Colorado, Nebraska, Oklahoma and Texas.

The wingspan is 20–22 mm.

The larvae feed on Gaillardia pulchella.
