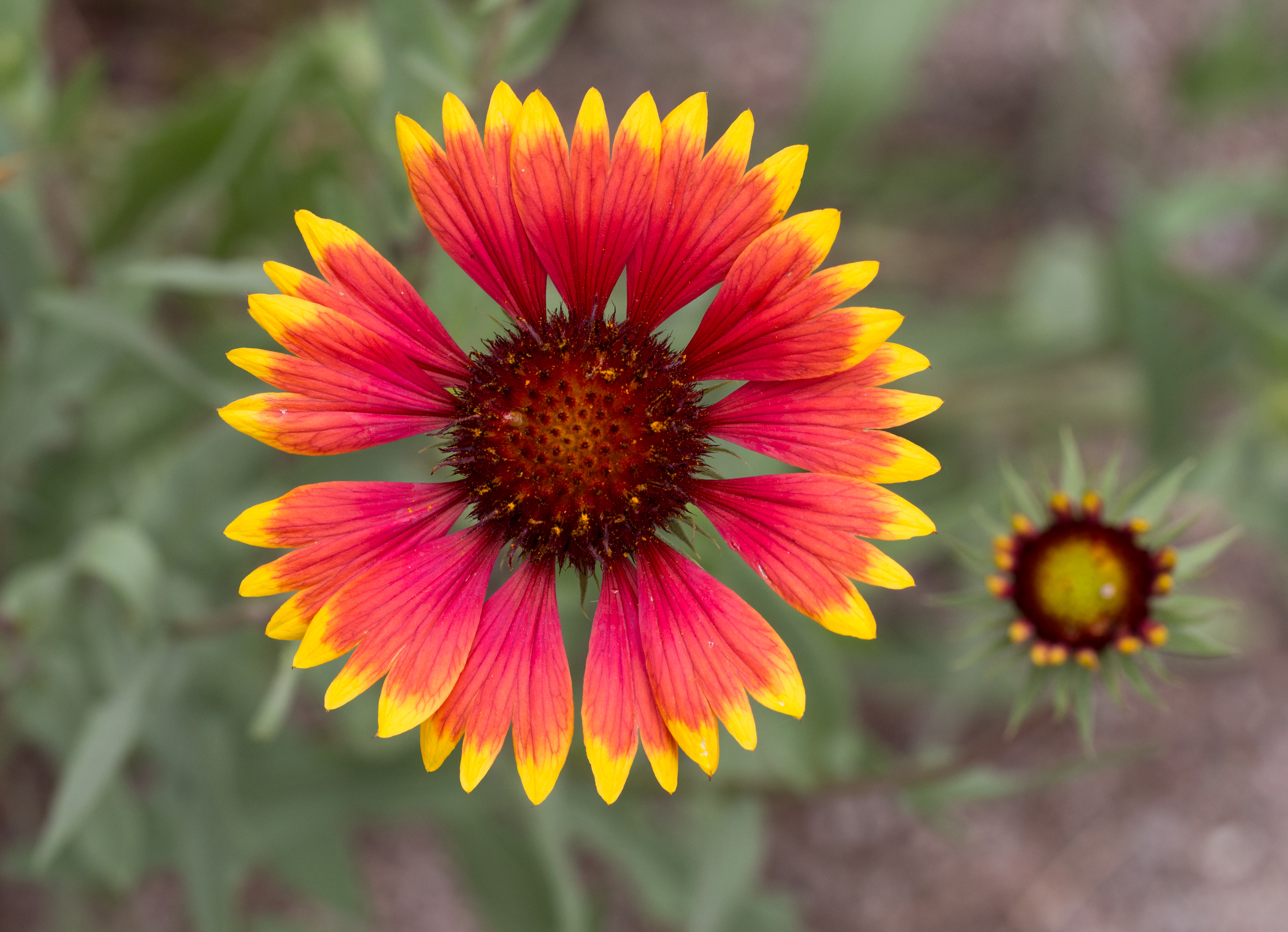
- Indian blanket inflorescence

Conservation status
- Apparently Secure (NatureServe)

Scientific classification
- Kingdom: Plantae
- Clade: Tracheophytes
- Clade: Angiosperms
- Clade: Eudicots
- Clade: Asterids
- Order: Asterales
- Family: Asteraceae
- Genus: Gaillardia
- Species: G. pulchella

Binomial name
- Gaillardia pulchella Foug.

Synonyms
- Synonymy: Calonnea pulcherrima Buc'hoz; Gaillardia bicolor Lam.; Gaillardia drummondii (Hook.) DC.; Gaillardia lobata Buckley; Gaillardia neomexicana A.Nelson; Gaillardia picta D.Don; Gaillardia scabrosa Buckley; Gaillardia villosa Rydb.; Galordia alternifolia Raeusch.

= Gaillardia pulchella =

Species of plant

Gaillardia pulchella (firewheel, Indian blanket, Indian blanketflower, or sundance) is a North American species of short-lived perennial or annual flowering plants in the sunflower family.

== Description ==
The branching stem of G. pulchella is hairy and upright, growing to 60 centimetres (24 inches) tall. The leaves are alternate, mostly basal, 4–8 cm (1 5/8–3 1/8 in) long, with edges smooth to coarsely toothed or lobed. It has a hairy stem, simple or branched near the base, where the leaves are essentially located towards the bottom of the plant.

The pinwheel, daisy-like inflorescences are 4–6.5 cm in diameter, vividly colored with red, orange and yellow and is surrounded by 10 to 20 ray florets up to 2 cm; the ligule has three lobes. The central disc florets of the flower head tend to be more red-violet, with the outer ray florets being yellow. In one variety, almost the entire flower is red, with only the barest tips of the petals touched with yellow. It typically blooms from May to July, but does so practically year-round in some areas.

The fruit is an achene, almost pyramidal, hairy, and prolonged by a pappus 5 to 8 millimetres (3/16 to 5/16 in) in length.

== Distribution and habitat ==
It is native to northern Mexico (Chihuahua, Coahuila, Nuevo León, Sonora, Tamaulipas) and the southern and central United States from Arizona east to Florida and the Carolinas and north as far as Nebraska. It is also naturalized in scattered locations in other parts of the U.S. as well as in Québec, Ontario, China, South Africa, and parts of Central and South America. The plant generally lives in the sandy plains and deserts of the south of the North American continent. It is common along the roads and prefers sandy soils. It can also grow on vacant lots in urban areas, but generally below 1,000 metres (3,300 feet) above sea level.

The flower has also been introduced to the Penghu (Pescadores) Islands in Taiwan, where it is the County Flower of Penghu County. It is called tiānrén jú (天人菊; "tianren daisy") in Chinese.

== Ecology ==
The plant is a larval host to the bordered patch butterfly (Chlosyne lacinia) and the painted schinia moth (Schinia volupia), which feed upon its foliage.

== Cultivation ==
G. pulchella is a hardy plant, not picky about soil, though sandy and well-drained are best. It has a high drought tolerance and does best with a dry, hot climate in full sun. Its vibrantly colored flowers can be seen carpeting fields and the sides of highways for miles in the summer to late fall. Favored by honeybees, it produces a dark reddish amber buttery tasting honey. In the garden, the flowers can be deadheaded to promote further blooming. It self-seeds freely.

=== Cultivars ===
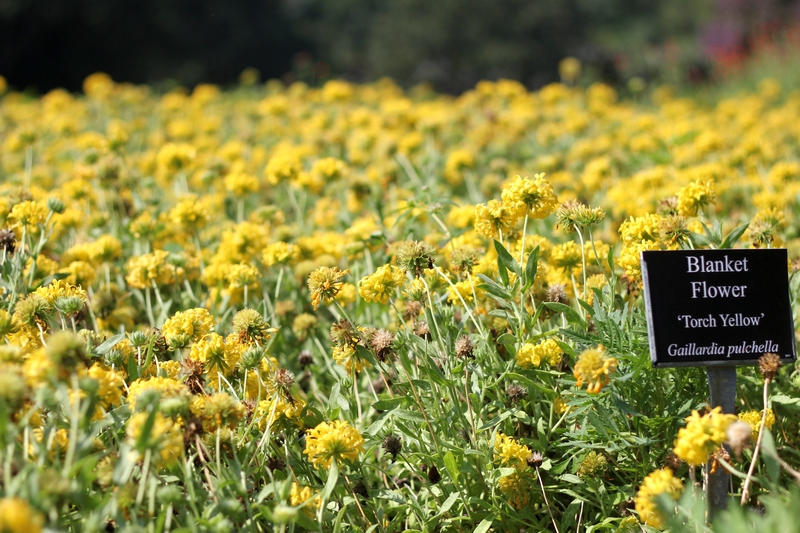
'Torch Yellow' cultivar

Gaillardia pulchella (with the perennial Gaillardia aristata) is the parent of Gaillardia × grandiflora, a hybrid, from which several cultivars have been created. One of these is 'Sundance Bicolor', a perennial double-form with the flower heads having florets of alternating red and yellow. Because of its bright colors, it is well adapted in the sun. Others are 'Goblin' and 'Tangerine'.

== Culture ==
It is the state wildflower of Oklahoma.

== Gallery ==
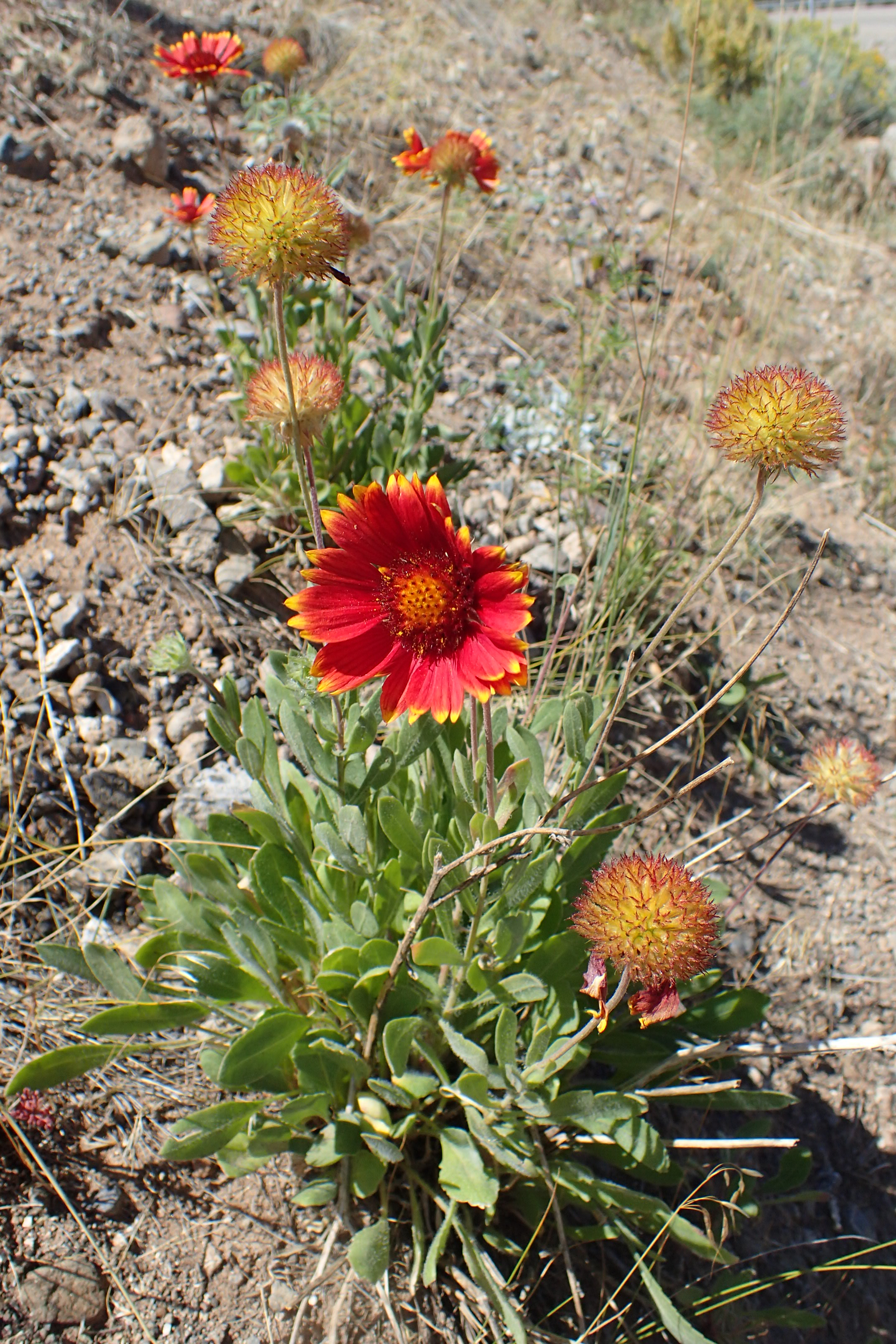
Entire plant

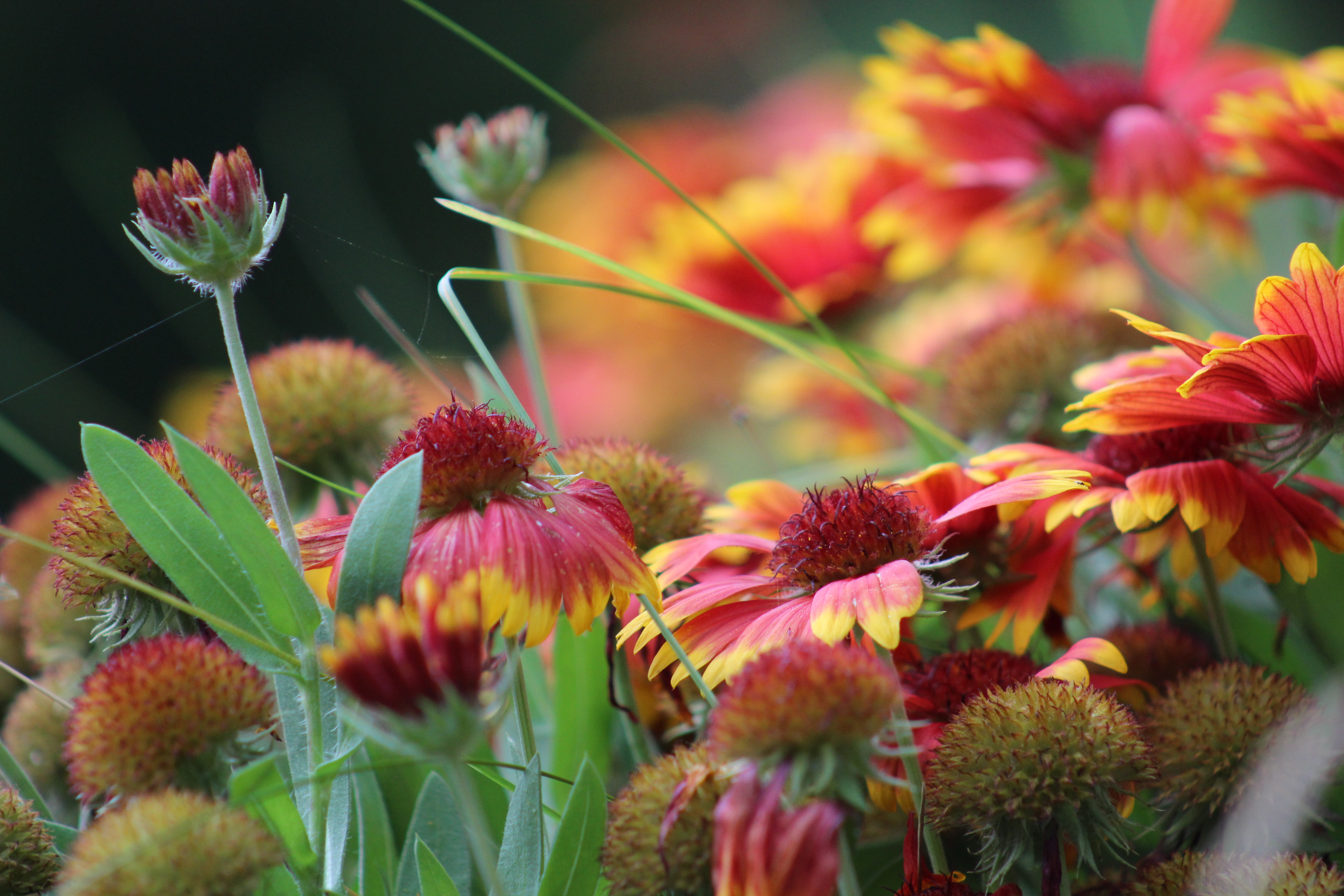
Side view of flowers

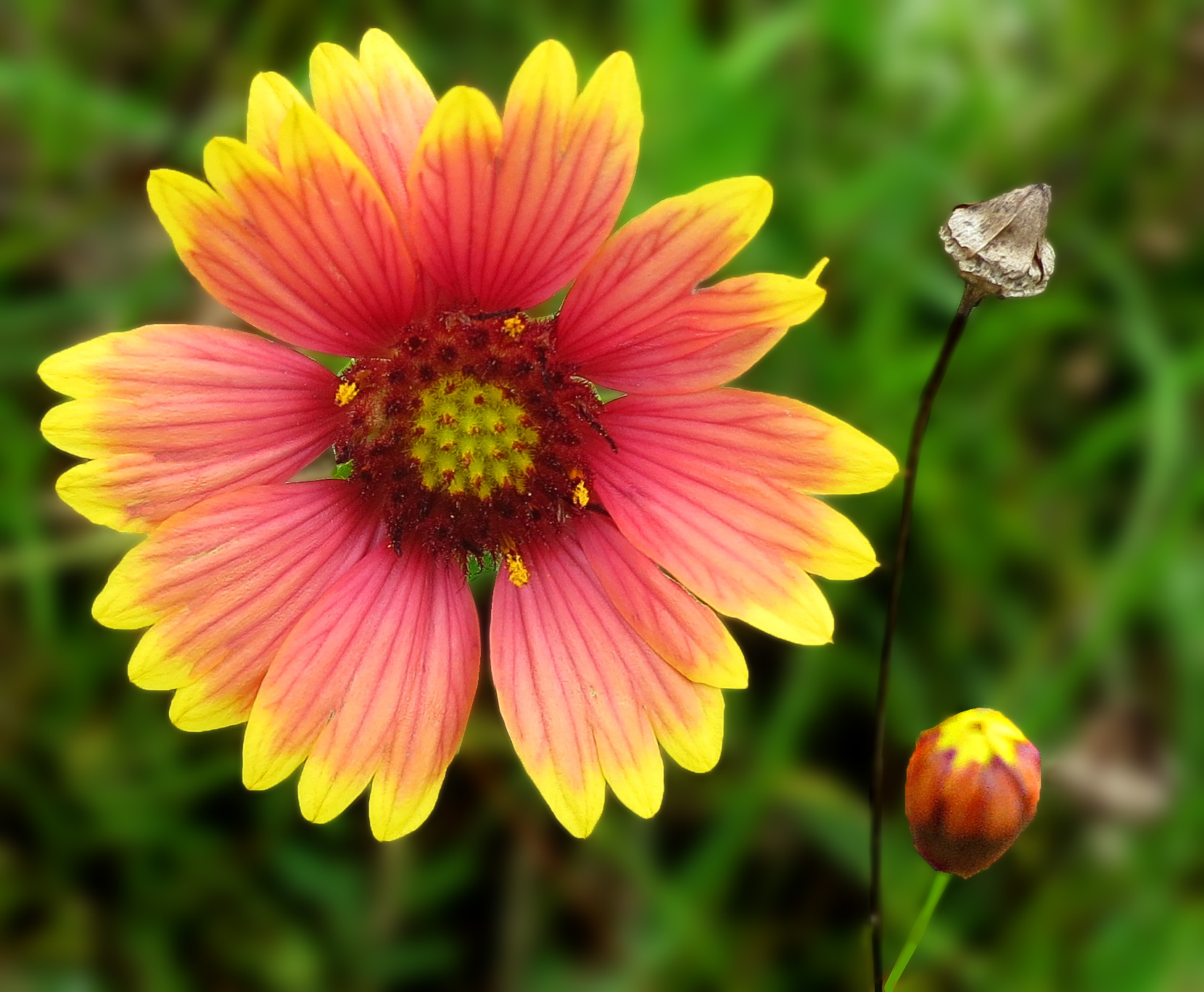
Flower close-up

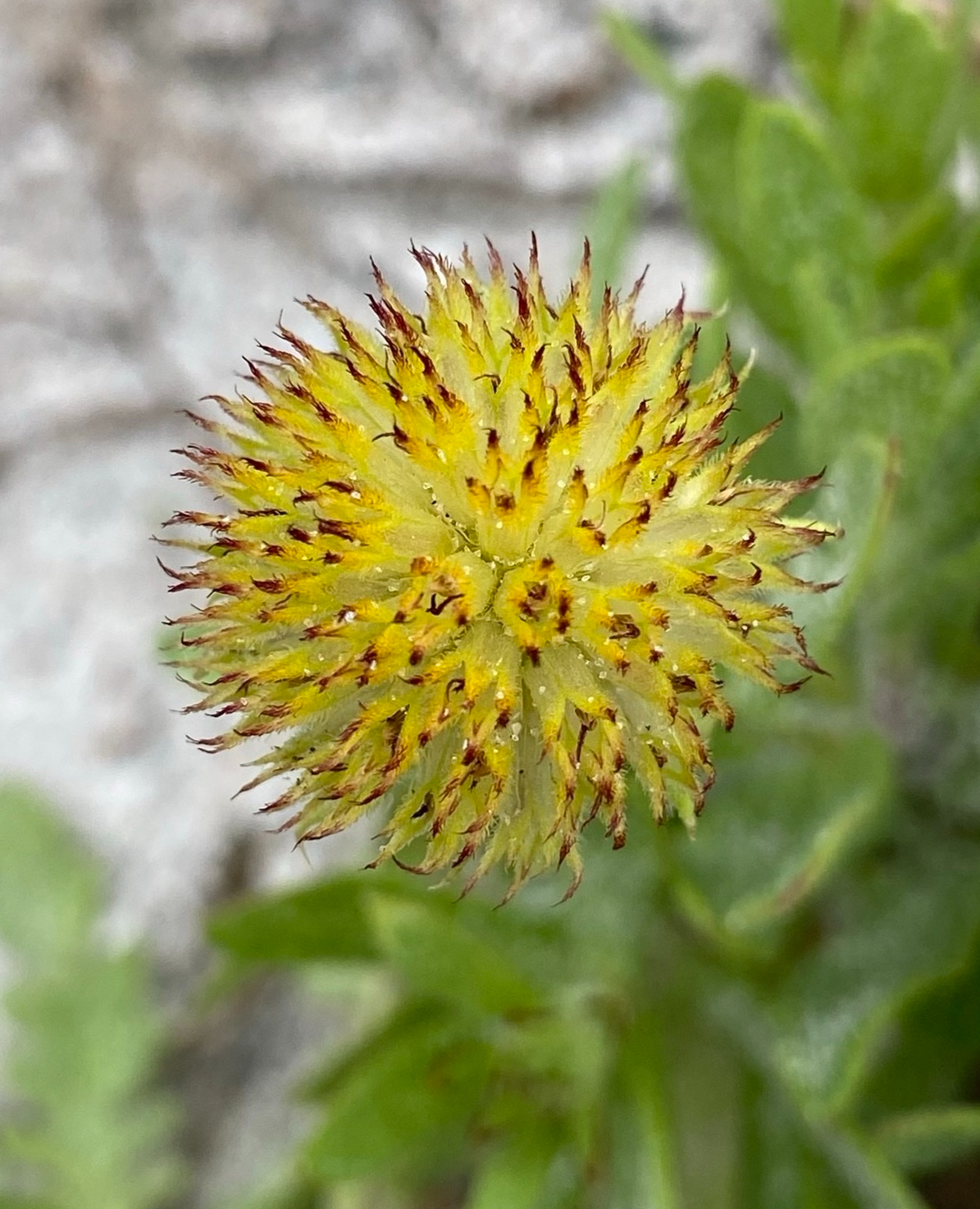
Lighter seedhead

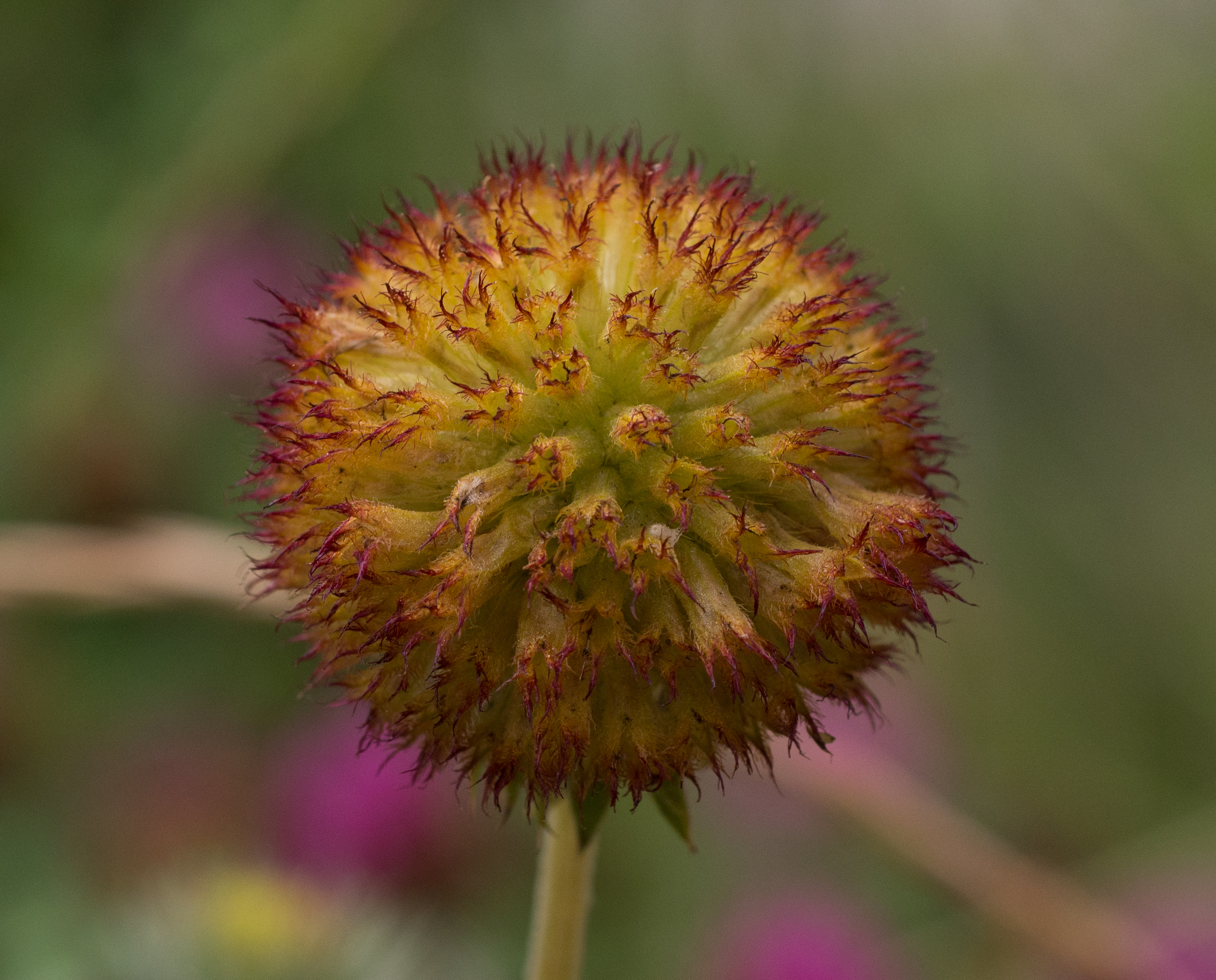
Darker seedhead
