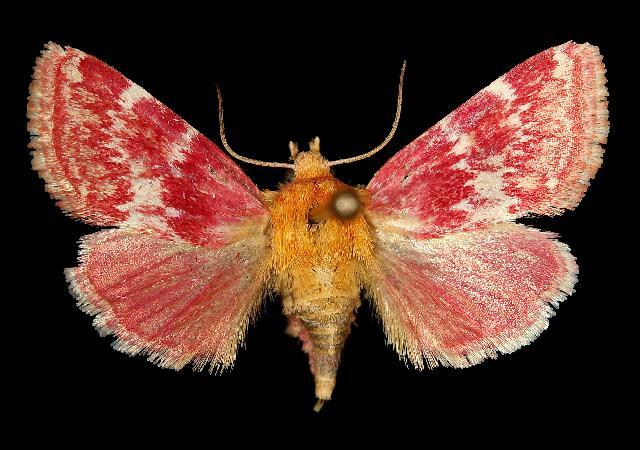

Scientific classification
- Domain: Eukaryota
- Kingdom: Animalia
- Phylum: Arthropoda
- Class: Insecta
- Order: Lepidoptera
- Superfamily: Noctuoidea
- Family: Noctuidae
- Genus: Schinia
- Species: S. masoni

Binomial name
- Schinia masoni Smith, 1896

Synonyms
- Schinia aden (Strecker, 1898); Rhododipsa aden Strecker, 1898; Rhododispa masoni Smith, 1896

= Schinia masoni =

Species of moth

The blanket flower moth (Schinia masoni) is a moth of the family Noctuidae. It is found in North America, including Colorado and Wyoming.

The wingspan is about 22 mm.

The larvae feed on Gaillardia aristata.
