= P. bakeri =

P. bakeri may refer to:

- Paguristes bakeri, Holmes, 1900, a hermit crab species in the genus Paguristes
- Psilostrophe bakeri, Greene, a flowering plant species in the genus Psilostrophe native to Colorado and Idaho
- Pteris bakeri, a fern species in the genus Pteris

== See also ==
- Bakeri (disambiguation)
