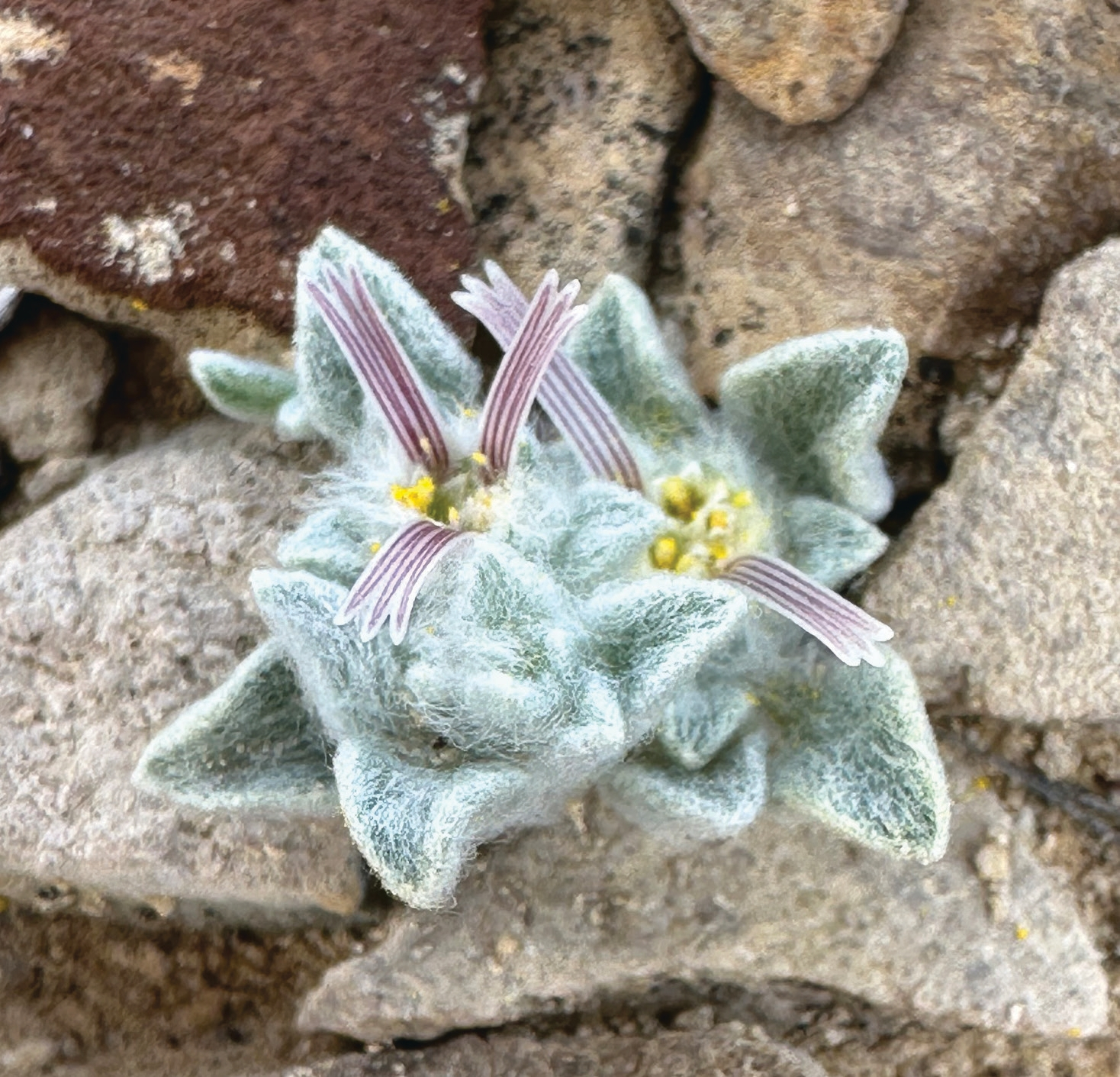
- Ovicula biradiata in Big Bend National Park, Texas

Scientific classification
- Kingdom: Plantae
- Clade: Tracheophytes
- Clade: Angiosperms
- Clade: Eudicots
- Clade: Asterids
- Order: Asterales
- Family: Asteraceae
- Subfamily: Asteroideae
- Tribe: Helenieae
- Subtribe: Tetraneurinae
- Genus: Ovicula; Manley
- Species: O. biradiata

Binomial name
- Ovicula biradiata Manley
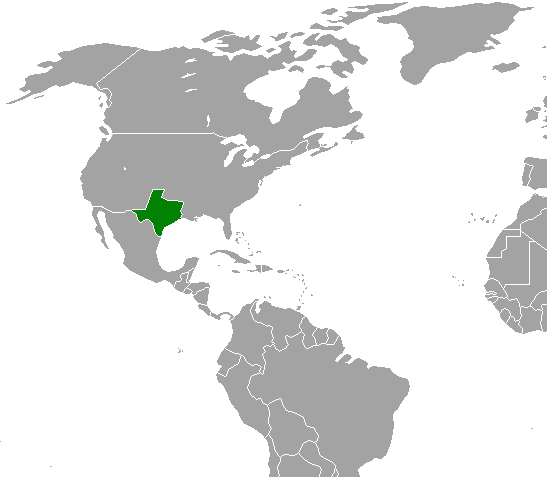
- O. biradiata is native to Big Bend National Park, Texas, USA.

= Ovicula =

Genus of flowering plants

Ovicula biradiata is a species of plant in the family Asteraceae. The species is native to the Chihuahuan Desert in Big Bend National Park, Texas, USA. It is the only species in the genus Ovicula. It was first documented in 2024 and nicknamed the "woolly devil" because of its hairy leaves and ray florets resembling devil horns.

== Discovery ==
The plant was found in March 2024 by a Big Bend National Park botanist, Debra L. Manley, in partnership with a park ranger. Manley uploaded her photographs of the plant to the community science platform iNaturalist. The research identifying it as a new genus was completed by a team of scientists from the California Academy of Sciences, Big Bend National Park, Sul Ross State University in Texas, and CIISDER at Universidad Autónoma de Tlaxcala in Durango. The last time a new plant species was discovered in a U.S. National Park was in 1976, when Dedeckera eurekensis was found at Death Valley.

== Description ==
=== Vegetative characteristics ===
Ovicula biradiata is a small, 1–3 cm (0.39–1.18 in) tall, 1–7 cm (0.39–2.76 in) wide, annual plant.

=== Generative characteristics ===
The solitary inflorescences are sessile with 1 mm long peduncles.

== Taxonomy ==
Ovicula biradiata was described as a genus and species new to science by American botanist Debra L. Manley in 2025. Woolly devil is an Asteraceae (the daisy-and-sunflower family), and its taxonomic tribe within that family, Helenieae, includes the sneezeweeds, blanket flowers, bitterweeds, and desert marigolds. The woolly devil has been placed in the subtribe Tetraneurinae. Biologists determined that "molecular data, micro-anatomy, and chromosome number show that it is the sister lineage to Psilostrophe," even though it looks like a Tetraneuris.

=== Etymology ===
The generic name Ovicula is derived from the Latin Ovis meaning sheep, referring to the woolly appearance of the plant. The specific epithet biradiata refers to the two ray florets of the inflorescences.

== Ecology ==
=== Habitat ===
Ovicula biradiata occurs in dry, rocky habitats.

== Conservation ==
The preliminary conservation status of O. biradiata is "vulnerable" (VU). The exact location of the populations are not disclosed, due to conservation concerns. It may be threatened by climate change.
