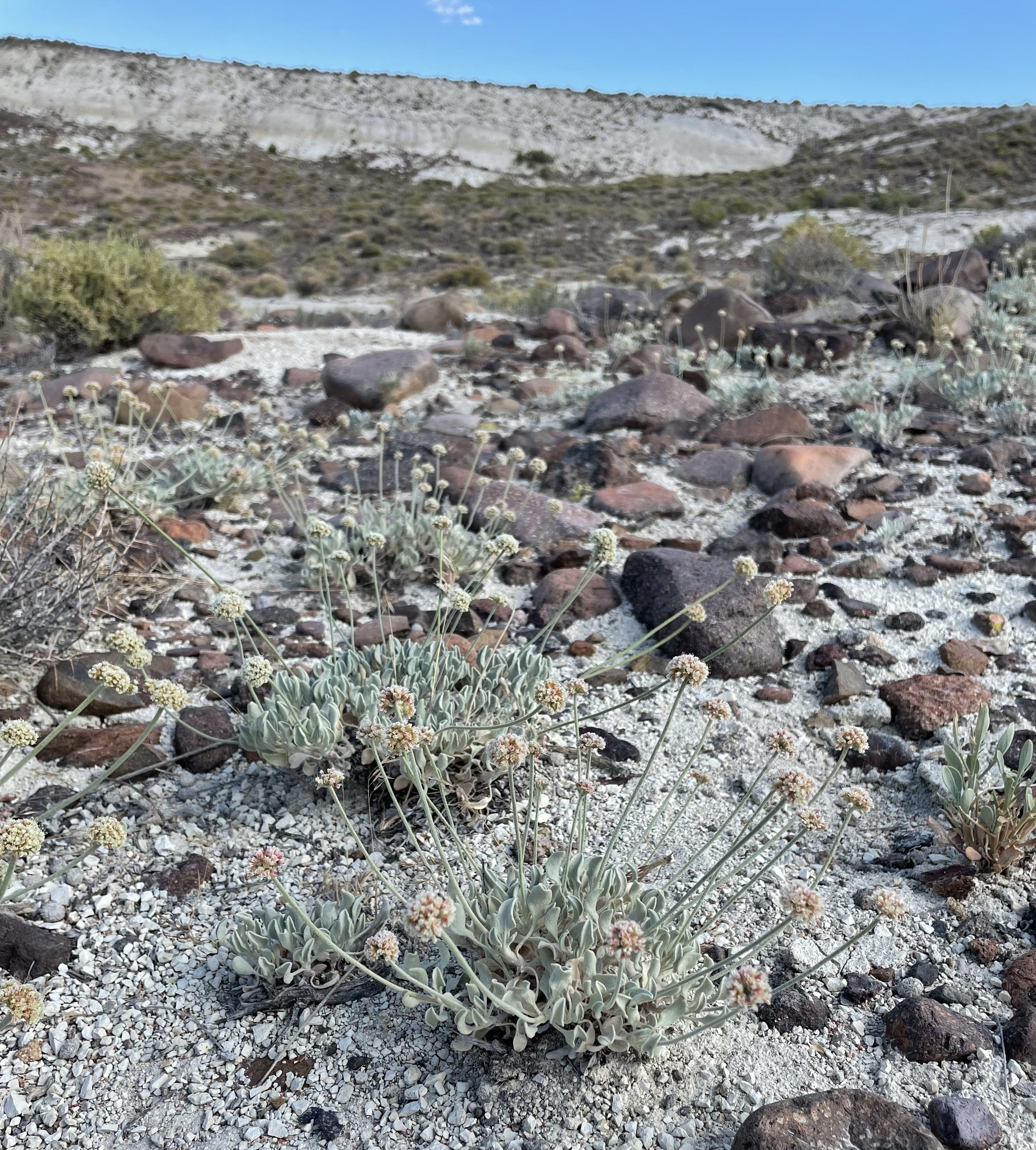

Conservation status
- Critically Imperiled (NatureServe)

Scientific classification
- Kingdom: Plantae
- Clade: Embryophytes
- Clade: Tracheophytes
- Clade: Angiosperms
- Clade: Eudicots
- Order: Caryophyllales
- Family: Polygonaceae
- Genus: Eriogonum
- Species: E. diatomaceum

Binomial name
- Eriogonum diatomaceum Reveal, J.Reynolds & Picciani

= Eriogonum diatomaceum =

Species of wild buckwheat

Eriogonum diatomaceum is a species of wild buckwheat known by the common name Churchill Narrows buckwheat. It is endemic to Nevada in the United States, where it is known only from the Pine Nut Mountains in Lyon County. It is limited to the Churchill Narrows near Fort Churchill State Historic Park. This plant was discovered in 1997 and described to science in 2002.

There is only a single population of the plant, split into about 15 occurrences and containing a total of less than 50,000 individuals. All the plants are within about three square miles on Bureau of Land Management lands.

== Description ==
This perennial herb has spreading stems, sometimes forming a mat up to 25 centimeters wide. It grows from a woody taproot. The leaf blades are oval in shape and coated in grayish woolly fibers. The inflorescence is a headlike cluster of flowers atop a white-woolly flowering stem up to 20 centimeters tall, but usually shorter. The flowers are cream-colored. This plant looks similar to Eriogonum pauciflorum, but it is more closely related to Eriogonum ochrocephalum.

This plant grows on diatomaceous clays. The soil originates in the Coal Valley Formation. Other species in the area include shadscale (Atriplex confertifolia), prince's plume (Stanleya pinnata var. pinnata), Bailey's greasewood (Sarcobates baileyi), budsage (Picrothamnus desertorum), green molly (Kochia americana), horsebrush (Tetradymia glabrata), annual psathyrotes (Psathyrotes annua), flat-top buckwheat (Eriogonum deflexum var. nevadense), and Lemmon's buckwheat (E. lemmonii).

== Conservation ==
Eriogonum diatomaceum is listed as a critically endangered and fully protected species by the State of Nevada. It was a Candidate species for listing on the Endangered Species Act, but the listing was determined as Not Warranted in 2014. A majority of the population is within a Bureau of Land Management proposed Area of Critical Environmental Concern (ACEC), but the ACEC has not been finalized as of 2024.

The substrate on which the plant grows is targeted for mining of cat litter and other products. Off-road vehicle use in the area is a threat, with two thirds of occurrences growing near access roads. Livestock grazing is also a threat, as the animals degrade the soil.
