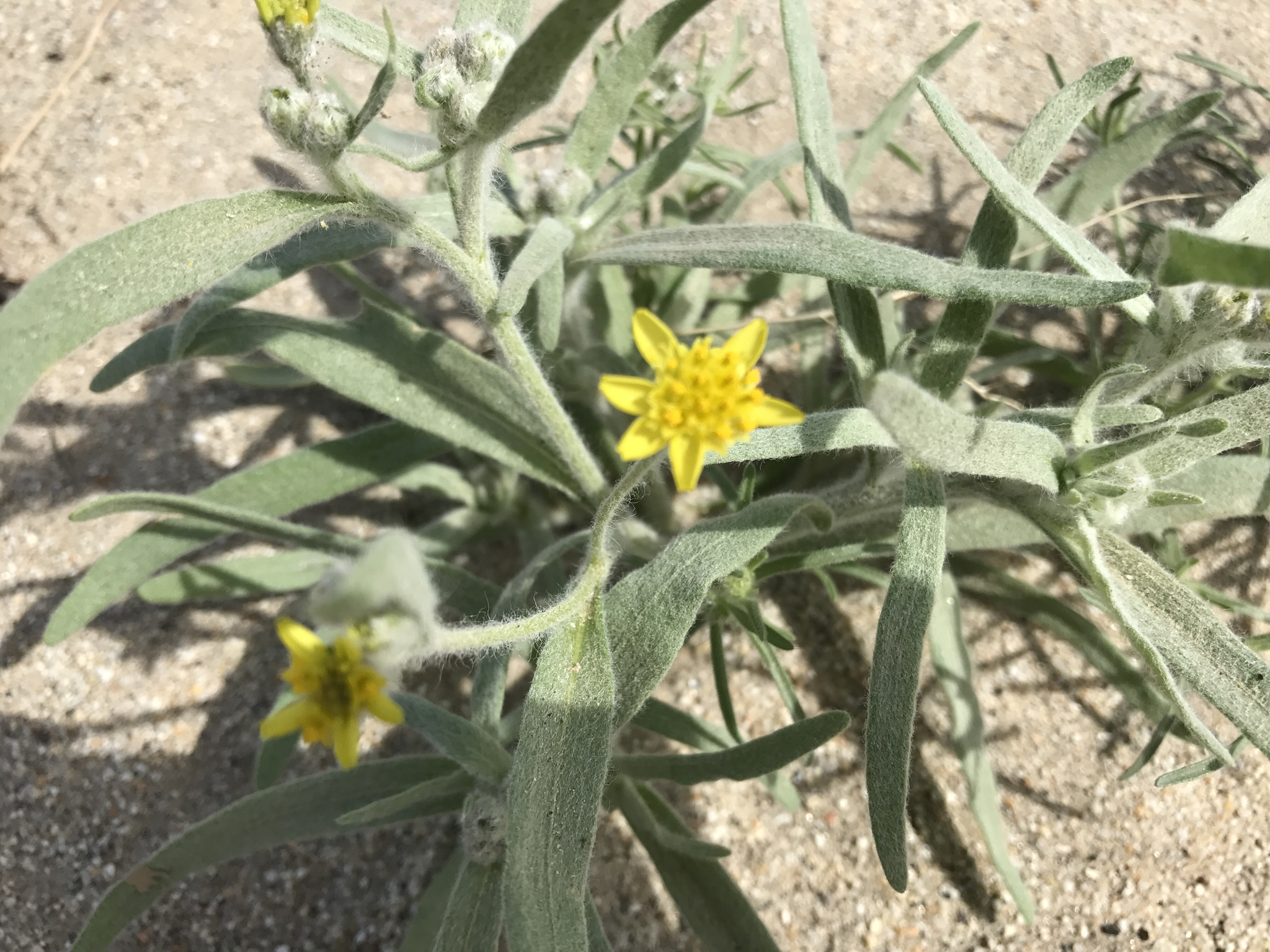

Scientific classification
- Kingdom: Plantae
- Clade: Embryophytes
- Clade: Tracheophytes
- Clade: Angiosperms
- Clade: Eudicots
- Clade: Asterids
- Order: Asterales
- Family: Asteraceae
- Genus: Baileya
- Species: B. pauciradiata

Binomial name
- Baileya pauciradiata Harvey & A.Gray

= Baileya pauciradiata =

Species of flowering plant

Baileya pauciradiata is a species of flowering plant in the daisy family, Asteraceae. It is known by the common names laxflower and Colorado desert marigold. It is native to the deserts of northwestern Mexico and the southwestern United States. It has been found in the States of California, Arizona, Nevada, Baja California, and Sonora.

== Description ==
Baileya pauciradiata is an annual or perennial herb with a gray-green downy stem branching to heights between 10 and 50 centimeters. The leaves are linear or lance-shaped and measure 4 to 14 centimeters long. Those at the base of the plant wither while those along the stem generally remain as the plant flowers.

The inflorescence is composed of 2 or 3 flower heads. Each has a few three-lobed yellow ray florets around a center of yellow disc florets. The fruit is a club-shaped achene about half a centimeter long.

== Food source ==
This plant is the main food source for the sand dune dwelling moth Schinia pallicincta.
