= Fanny Anne Charsley =

British natural history painter and lithographer

- Born: 23 July 1828; Beaconsfield, Buckinghamshire, England
- Died: 21 December 1915 (aged 87); Hove, Sussex, England

Fanny Anne Charsley (23 July 1828 – 21 December 1915) was a botanical artist and collector. She collected plants for the Victorian government botanist, Baron Ferdinand von Mueller who named the Australian flower Helipterum charsleyae in her honour. The flower has since been reclassified as Rhodanthe charsleyae and is a species of paper daisy. Her publication Wild Flowers Around Melbourne was one of the first books on Victorian flora aimed at the general public.

== Biography ==
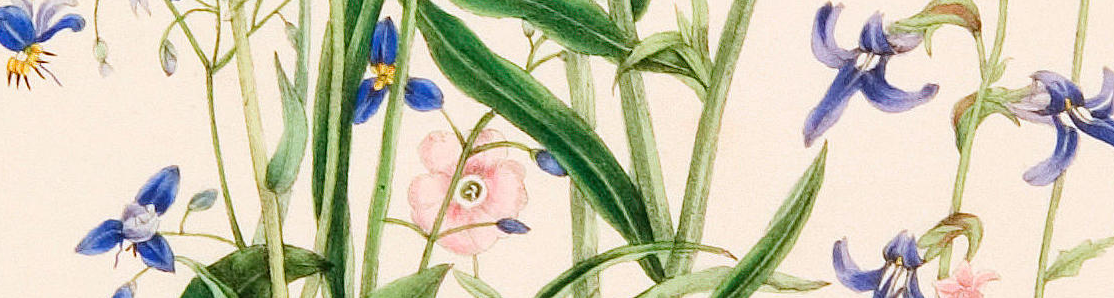
Detail from an 1867 watercolour by Charsley which was auctioned by Bonhams in 2004

Charsley was born on 23 July 1828 in Beaconsfield, Buckinghamshire. She was the youngest daughter of the eleven children of solicitor John Charsley and his wife Catherine. All five sisters had artistic talent and received an education that included tuition in both drawing and watercolours. In 1856 she travelled to Australia with her family and they settled in Melbourne. She stayed in Melbourne for ten years before returning to England. During her time in Australia she painted the local flora and became a student of Ferdinand Von Mueller. Mueller was appointed as a foundation government botanist of Victoria and later became the director of the botanical gardens at Melbourne, where he had built what is now the national herbarium. He thought Charsley was a talented artist and was impressed by the veracity and intricacy of her work. She died on 21 December 1915, aged 87 at Hove in Sussex where she had been living with some of her sisters.

== Work and legacy ==
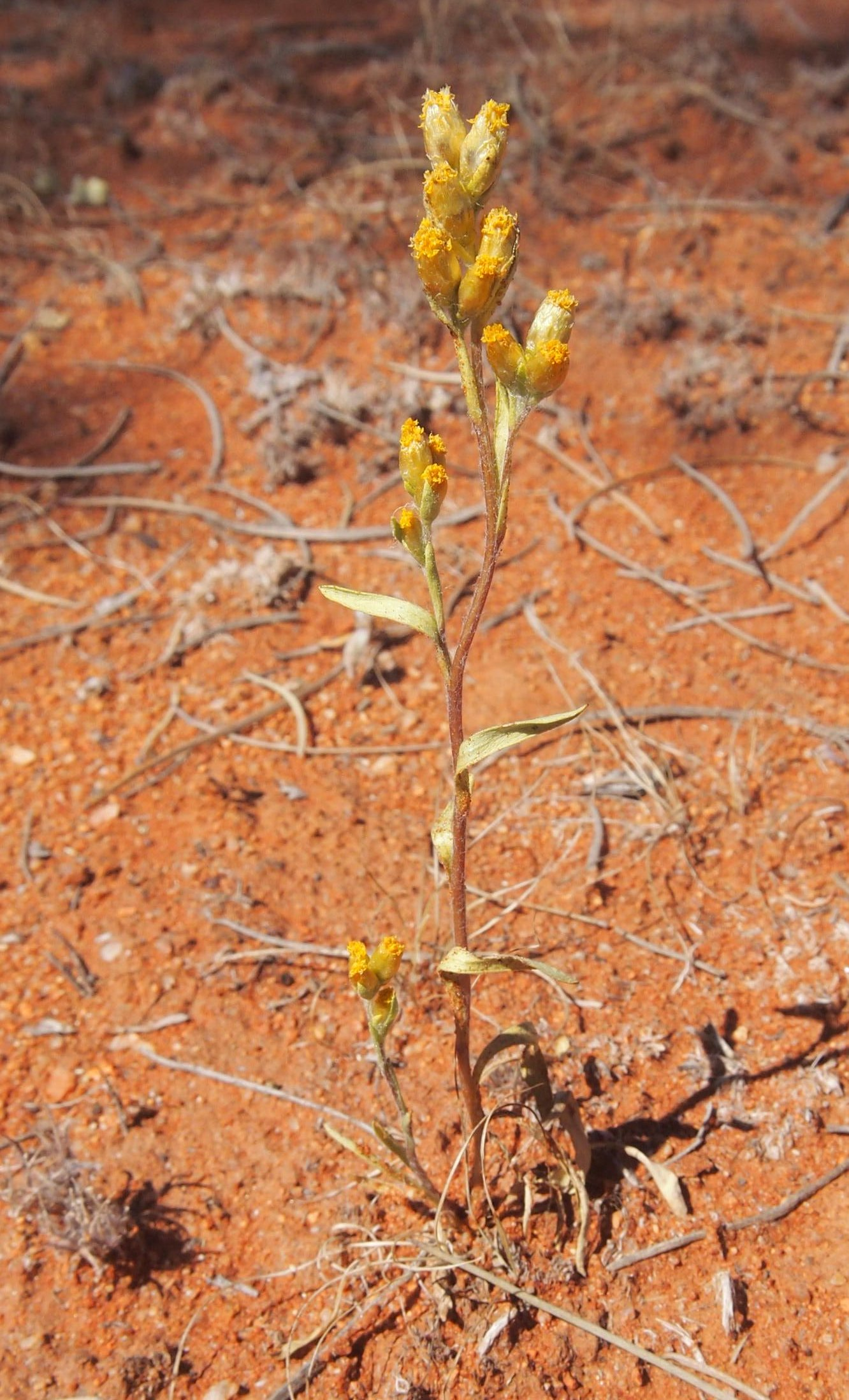
The paper daisy Rhodanthe charsleyae is named for her

Charsley's paintings were of excellent technical quality and were not only works of art but were botanically accurate. When she returned to England after 10 years, she lithographed her botanical drawings onto stone herself. These were then hand coloured and were published in London in 1867 in a book titled The Wild Flowers around Melbourne. The title page is decorated with flowers and leaves and the work is dedicated to Baron Ferdinand von Mueller. Great interest was shown in the very different and distinctive colonial flora, and Fanny's volume proved popular. This book is only one of a handful of botanical books published by women working in Australia in the later half of the 19th Century. The National Library of Australia holds her original watercolours and lithographs in an album bound in gold tooled calf and covered front and back with fretwork wooden panels.
