= Fanleaf =

Fanleaf can mean:

- Psathyrotes, a genus of North American desert plants
- Fanleaf virus, a grape virus
- Fioria, a genus of plants in the family Malvaceae
