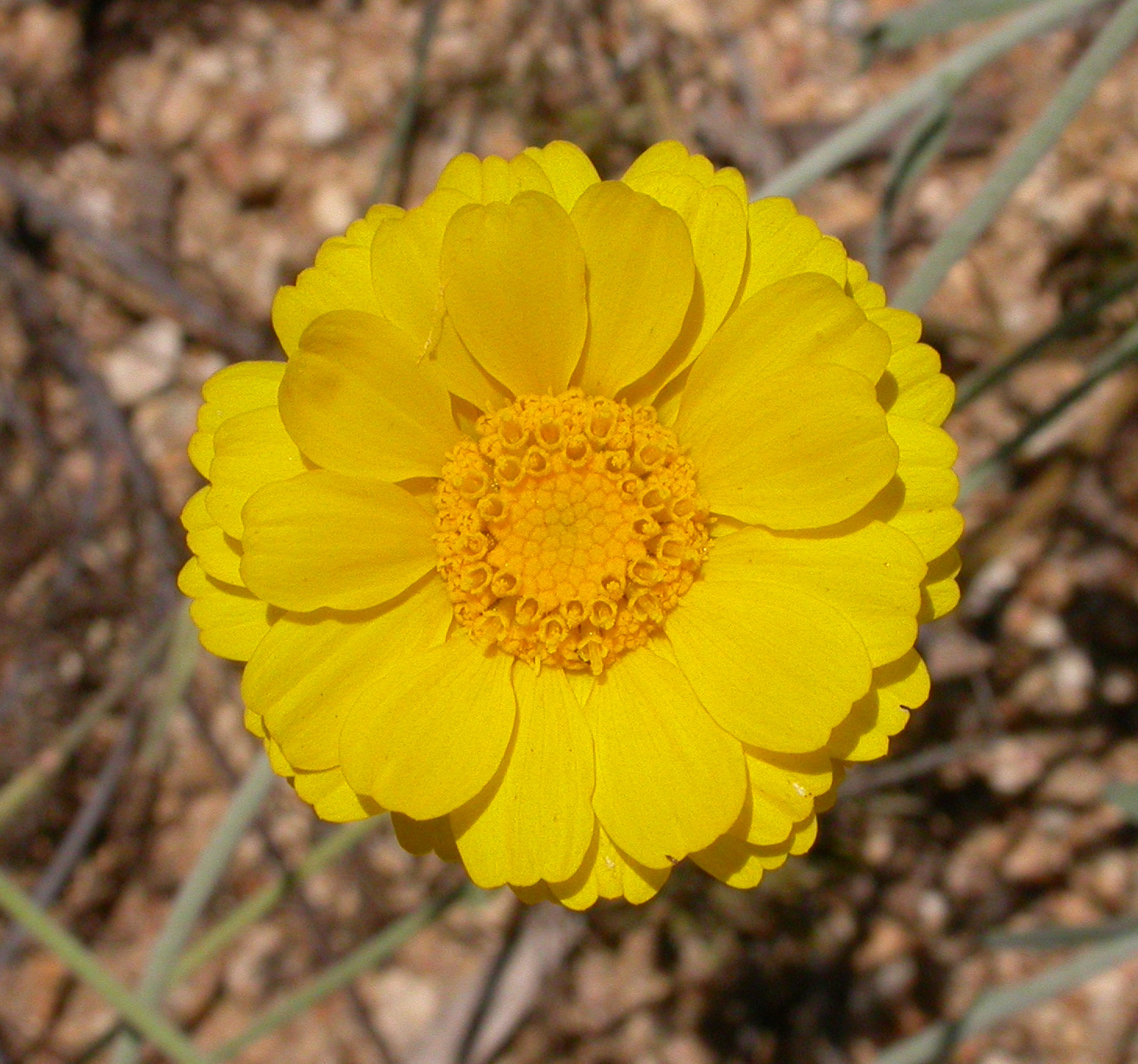

Scientific classification
- Kingdom: Plantae
- Clade: Tracheophytes
- Clade: Angiosperms
- Clade: Eudicots
- Clade: Asterids
- Order: Asterales
- Family: Asteraceae
- Genus: Baileya
- Species: B. multiradiata

Binomial name
- Baileya multiradiata Harvey & A.Gray

Synonyms
- Baileya australis Rydb.; Baileya multiradiata var. nudicaulis A.Gray; Baileya multiradiata var. thurberi (Rydb.) Kittell; Baileya thurberi Rydb.

= Baileya multiradiata =

Species of flowering plant

Baileya multiradiata is a North American species of sun-loving wildflower in the family Asteraceae. It is native to the deserts of northern Mexico and the Southwestern United States. It has been found in the States of Sonora, Chihuahua, Coahuila, Durango, Aguascalientes, California, Arizona, Nevada, Utah, New Mexico, and Texas.

B. multiradiata is a short-lived perennial to annual that forms a clumping patch of silvery-green foliage, growing to 50 centimetres (20 inches) tall. The leaves are 4–8 cm (1 1/2–3 1/4 in) long. The many tall, naked stems are each topped with a bright yellow daisy-like flower head about 4–5 cm (1 1/2–2 in) wide, with 25–50 ray florets. It blooms from April to October. The seed-like fruit is whitish, with no scales or bristles at the tip.

Although called a desert marigold, it is only a remote relative of the true marigolds of the genus Tagetes.

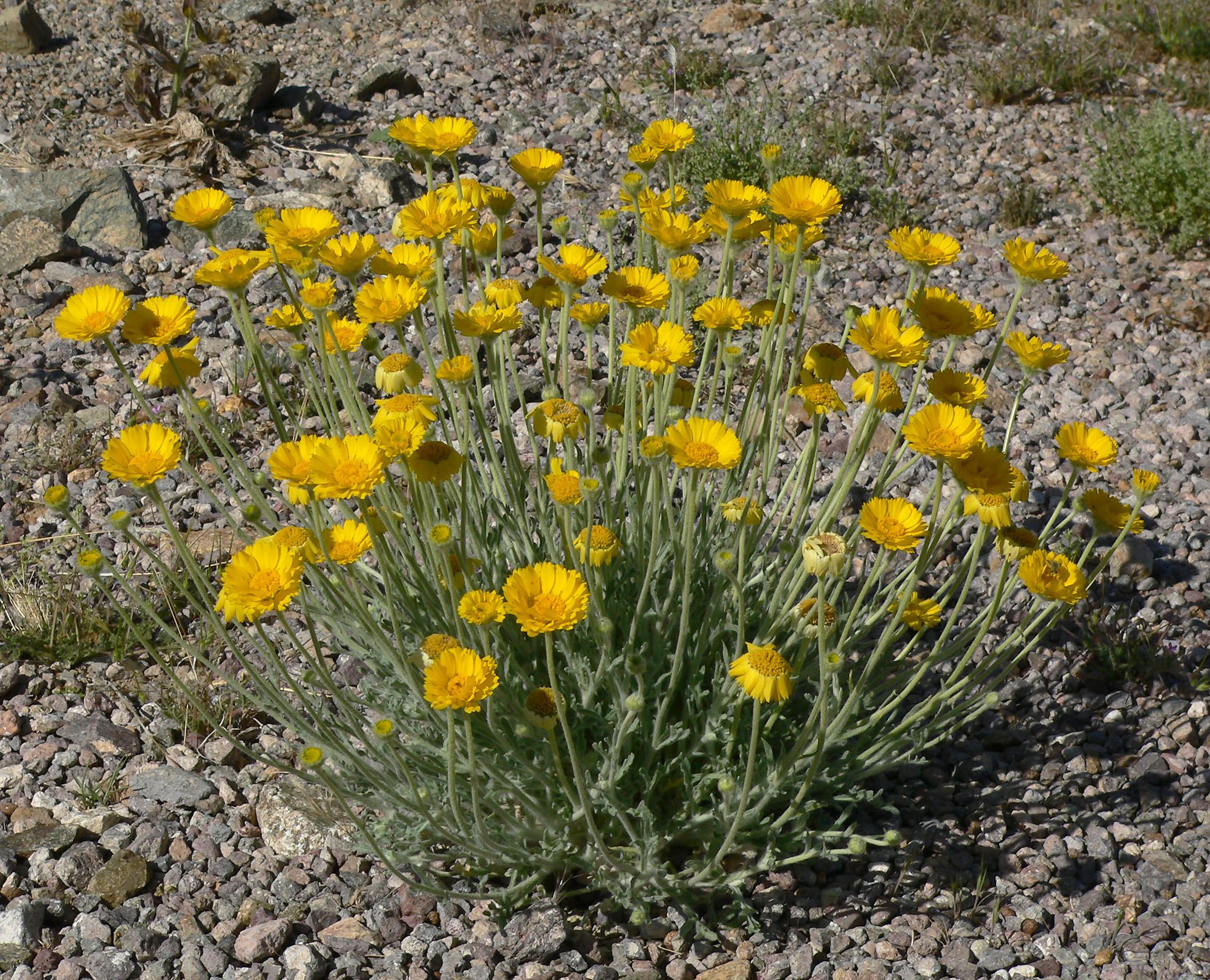
B. multiradiata growing in the southern Nevada desert
