= Plateilema =

Scientific classification
- Kingdom: Plantae
- Clade: Tracheophytes
- Clade: Angiosperms
- Clade: Eudicots
- Clade: Asterids
- Order: Asterales
- Family: Asteraceae
- Subfamily: Asteroideae
- Tribe: Helenieae
- Subtribe: Plateileminae; B.G.Baldwin
- Genus: Plateilema (A.Gray) Cockerell
- Species: P. palmeri

Binomial name
- Plateilema palmeri (A.Gray) Cockerell

Synonyms
- Actinella sect. Plateilema A.Gray; Actinella palmeri A.Gray; Actinea palmeri (A.Gray) B.L.Rob.

Genus of plants

Plateilema is a genus of flowering plants in the tribe Helenieae within the family Asteraceae.

Species

There is only one known species, Plateilema palmeri, native to Texas (Big Bend National Park in Brewster County), Coahuila, and Nuevo León.
