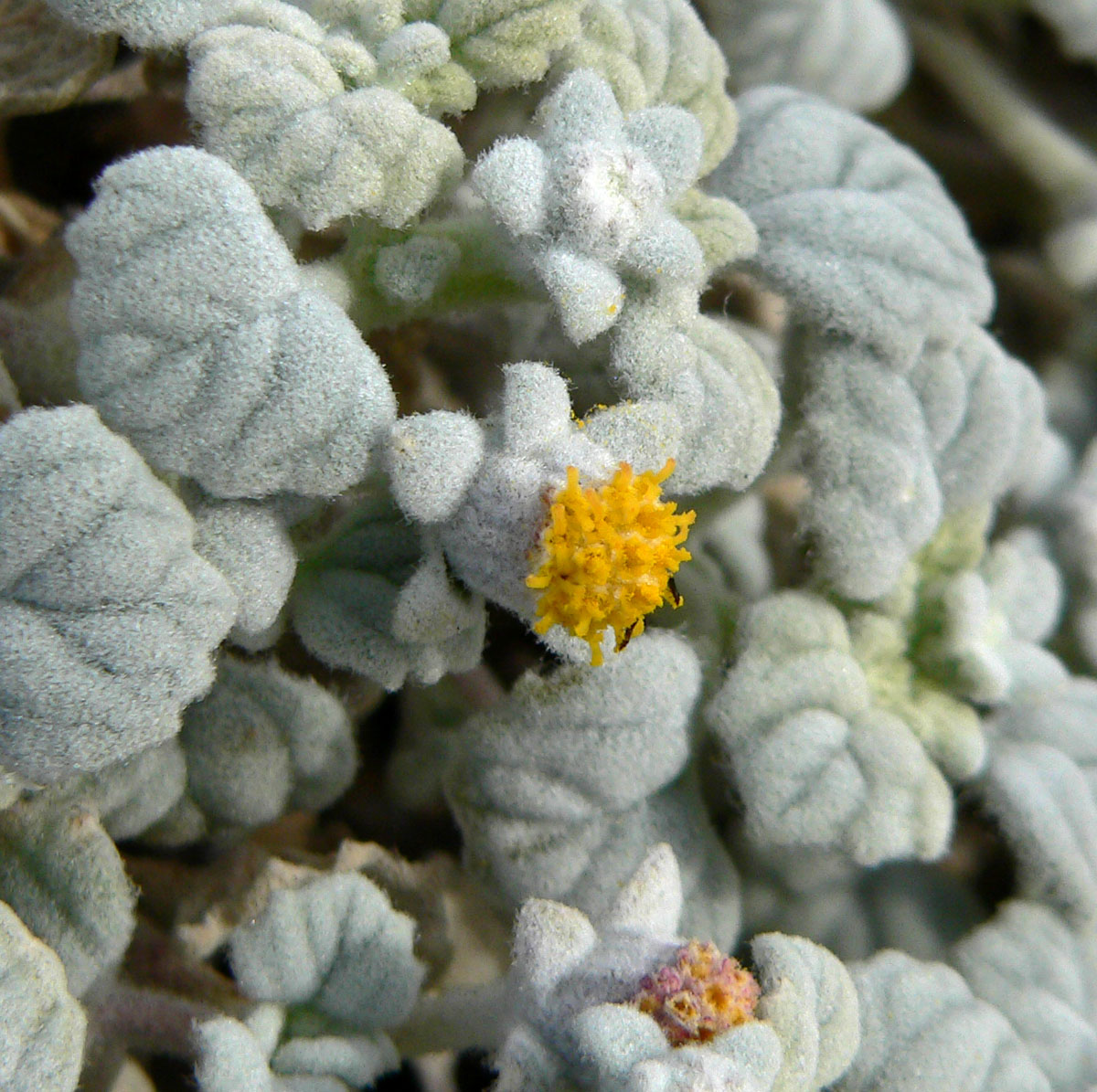

Scientific classification
- Kingdom: Plantae
- Clade: Embryophytes
- Clade: Tracheophytes
- Clade: Spermatophytes
- Clade: Angiosperms
- Clade: Eudicots
- Clade: Asterids
- Order: Asterales
- Family: Asteraceae
- Genus: Psathyrotes
- Species: P. ramosissima

Binomial name
- Psathyrotes ramosissima (Torr.) A.Gray

Synonyms
- Tetradymia ramosissima

= Psathyrotes ramosissima =

Species of plant

Psathyrotes ramosissima is a species of flowering plant in the aster family known by the common names velvet turtleback and turtleback. It is native to the southwestern United States.

== Description ==
It is a low, neatly mounded plant producing spreading stems which are hairless to densely woolly in texture. It grows to 12.5 centimetres (5 in) tall and has a turpentine odour.

Leaves are borne on long petioles. The leaf blade is roundish, veined, and up to 2 cm (3/4 in) long. It has a toothed edge and a velvety surface coated in woolly fibres and shiny hairs; it is brownish to grayish or pale green in color.

The knobby inflorescence is 6 millimetres (1/4 in) wide and lined with woolly gray-green phyllaries with dull points that curve outward. It contains several hairy yellow disc florets. The fruit is an achene tipped with a large pappus of over 100 long, fine bristles.

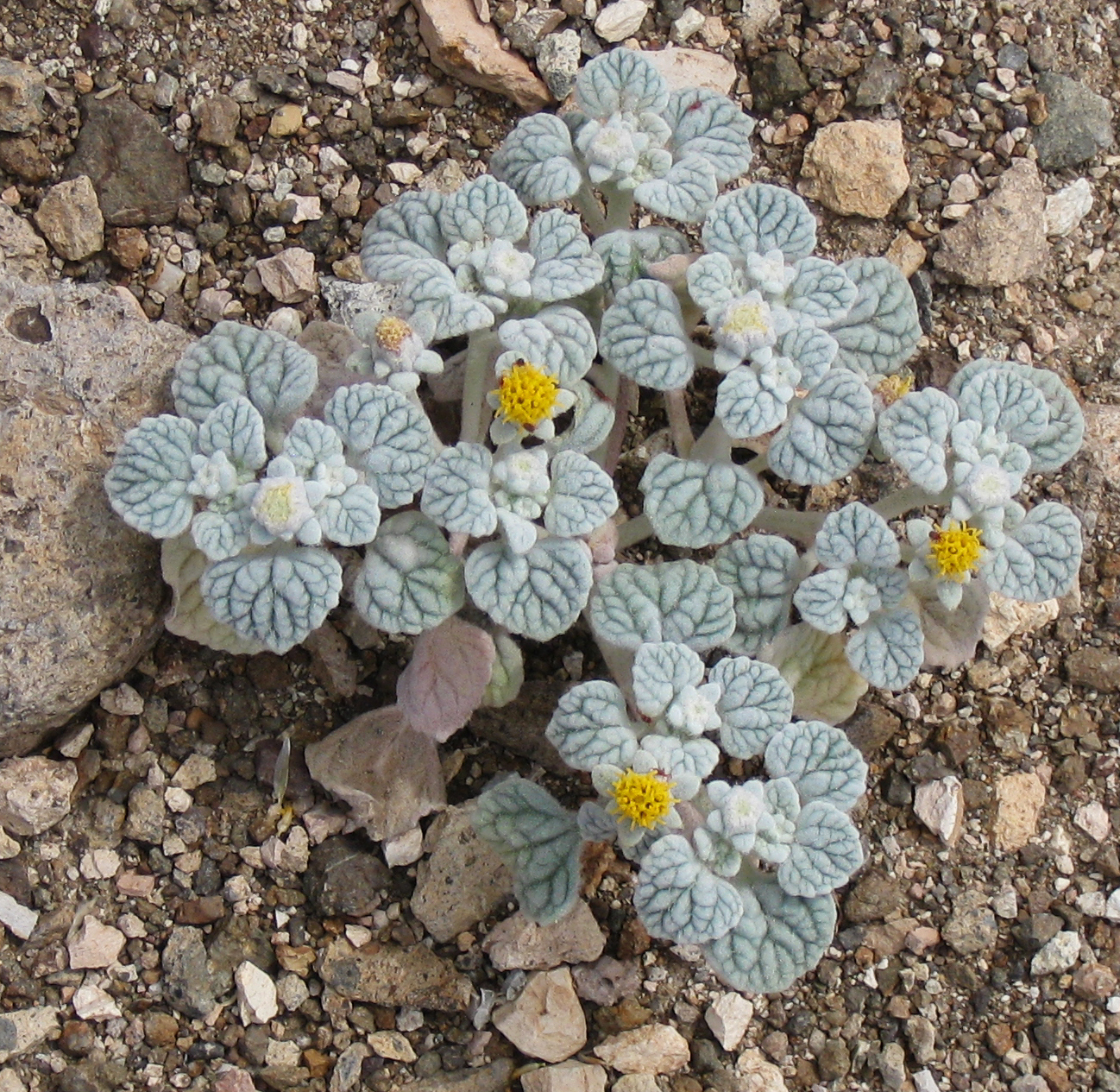
Turtleback plant, Death Valley

== Distribution and habitat ==
It is native to the southwestern United States and northwestern Mexico, where it grows in desert scrub.
