= Balduina (plant) =

Scientific classification
- Kingdom: Plantae
- Clade: Tracheophytes
- Clade: Angiosperms
- Clade: Eudicots
- Clade: Asterids
- Order: Asterales
- Family: Asteraceae
- Subfamily: Asteroideae
- Tribe: Helenieae
- Subtribe: Gaillardiinae
- Genus: Balduina; Nutt.

Synonyms
- Actinospermum Elliott

Genus of plants

Balduina (honeycombhead) is a genus of North American plants in the sunflower family described as a genus in 1818.

The genus is endemic to the Southeastern United States. It is named in honor of William Baldwyn M.D., 1779–1819, of Savannah, Georgia.

Species

- Balduina angustifolia (Pursh) B.L.Rob. - Florida Georgia Alabama Mississippi
- Balduina atropurpurea R.M.Harper - Florida Georgia South Carolina North Carolina
- Balduina uniflora Nutt. - Louisiana Florida Georgia (U.S. state) Alabama Mississippi South Carolina North Carolina
