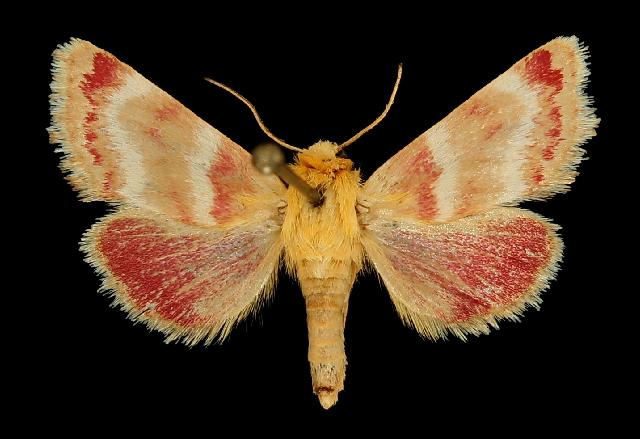

Scientific classification
- Domain: Eukaryota
- Kingdom: Animalia
- Phylum: Arthropoda
- Class: Insecta
- Order: Lepidoptera
- Superfamily: Noctuoidea
- Family: Noctuidae
- Genus: Schinia
- Species: S. miniana

Binomial name
- Schinia miniana (Grote, 1881)

Synonyms
- Schinia pallicincta Smith, 1906

= Schinia miniana =

Species of moth

Schinia miniana, the desert-marigold moth, is a moth of the family Noctuidae. The species was first described by Augustus Radcliffe Grote in 1881. It is found in North America from California to western Texas, north to Colorado and Nevada, south into Mexico.

The wingspan is 19–24 mm.

The larvae feed on Baileya.
