= Pelucha =

Scientific classification
- Kingdom: Plantae
- Clade: Tracheophytes
- Clade: Angiosperms
- Clade: Eudicots
- Clade: Asterids
- Order: Asterales
- Family: Asteraceae
- Subfamily: Asteroideae
- Tribe: Helenieae
- Subtribe: Psathyrotinae
- Genus: Pelucha; S.Wats.
- Species: P. trifida

Binomial name
- Pelucha trifida S.Wats.

Genus of shrubs

Pelucha is a genus of Mexican shrubs in the sneezeweed tribe within the daisy family.

Species

The only known species is Pelucha trifida, native to the Mexican States of Sonora and Baja California.
