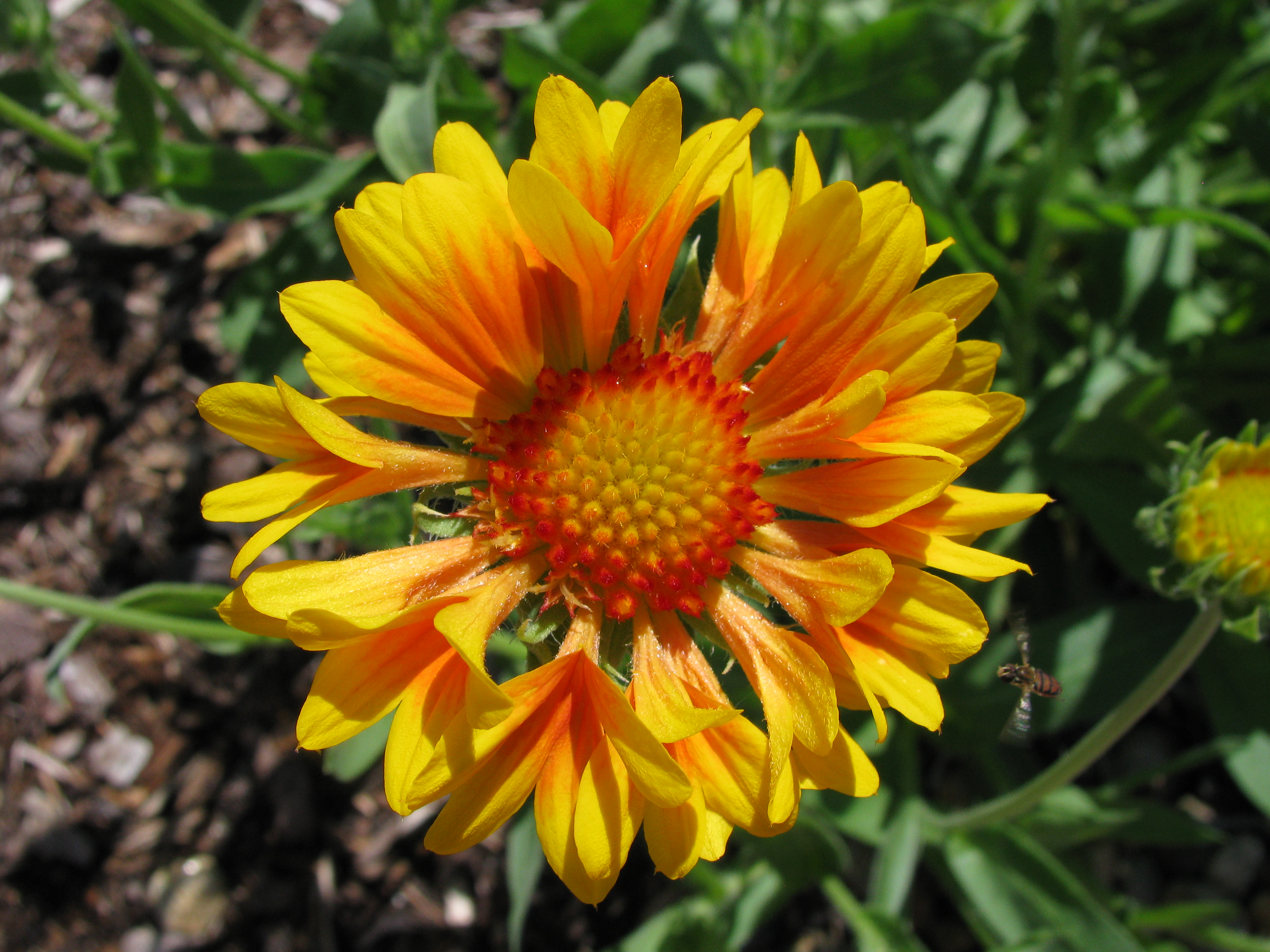
- Gaillardia × grandiflora, a hybrid of Gaillardia aristata and Gaillardia pulchella

Scientific classification
- Kingdom: Plantae
- Clade: Tracheophytes
- Clade: Angiosperms
- Clade: Eudicots
- Clade: Asterids
- Order: Asterales
- Family: Asteraceae
- Subfamily: Asteroideae
- Tribe: Helenieae; Lindl.

Genera
- Amblyolepis; Baileya; Balduina; Gaillardia; Helenium; Hymenoxys; Marshallia; Ovicula; Pelucha; Plateilema; Psathyrotes; Psilostrophe; Tetraneuris; Trichoptilium

= Helenieae =

Tribe of flowering plants in the family Asteraceae

Helenieae is a tribe of flowering plants in the family Asteraceae. The type genus is Helenium; among the best-known members of the tribe is Gaillardia. Helenieae is usually treated as a distinct tribe, though some authors subsume it and several related tribes as subtribes within a broader circumscription of Heliantheae.

== Subtribes and genera ==
Subtribes and genera of Helenieae recognised by the Global Compositae Database:

- Subtribe Gaillardiinae Less.
  - Balduina Nutt.
  - Gaillardia Foug.
  - Helenium L.
- Subtribe Marshalliinae H.Rob.
  - Marshallia Schreb.
- Subtribe Plateileminae B.G.Baldwin
  - Plateilema (A.Gray) Cockerell
- Subtribe Psathyrotinae B.G.Baldwin
  - Pelucha S.Watson
  - Psathyrotes (Nutt.) A.Gray
  - Trichoptilium A.Gray
- Subtribe Tetraneurinae Rydb.
  - Amblyolepis DC.
  - Baileya Harv. & A.Gray ex Torr.
  - Hymenoxys Cass.
  - Ovicula Manley
  - Psilostrophe DC.
  - Tetraneuris Greene
