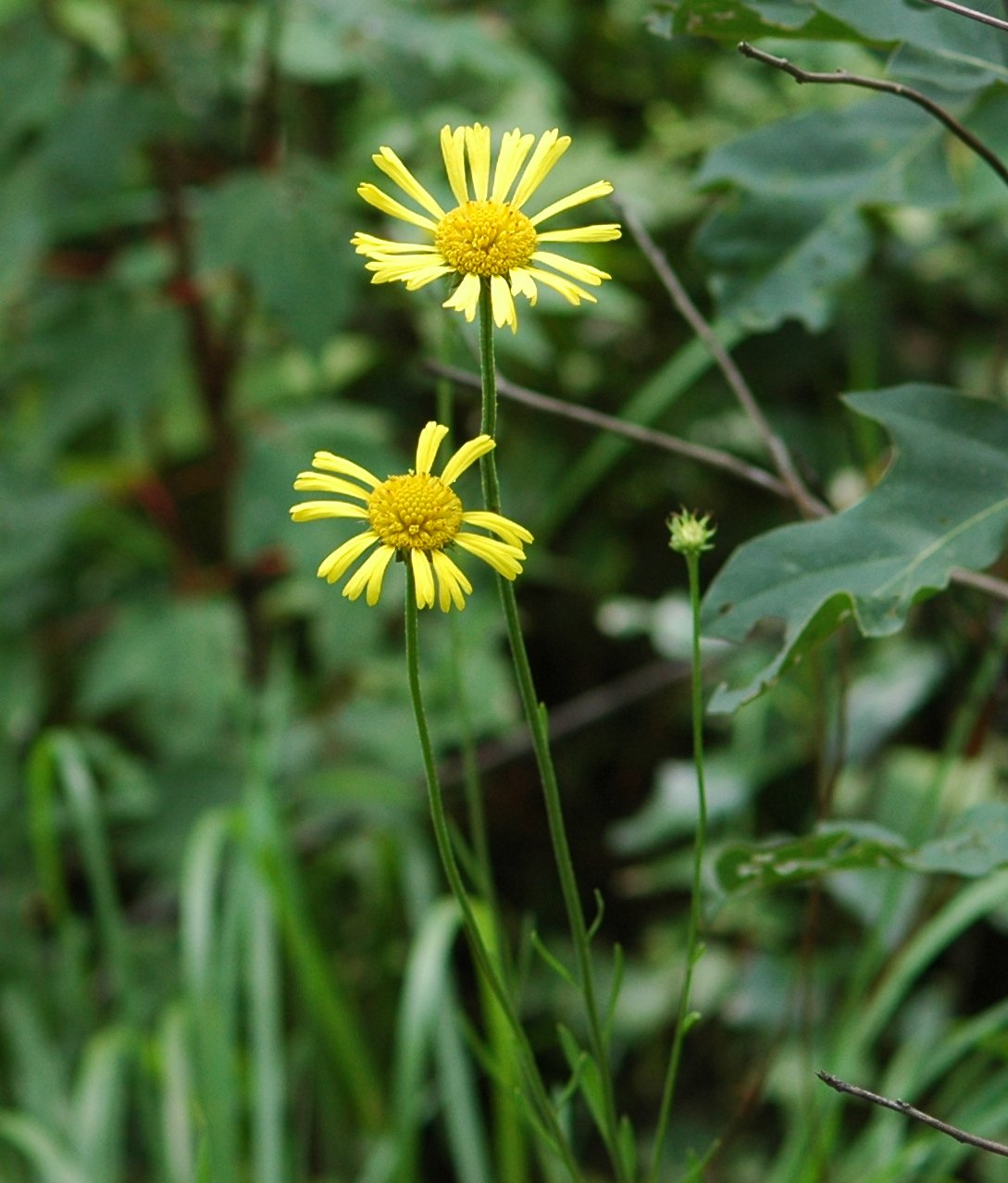
- Two Balduina uniflora flower heads, and one immature flower head.

Conservation status
- Apparently Secure (NatureServe)

Scientific classification
- Kingdom: Plantae
- Clade: Tracheophytes
- Clade: Angiosperms
- Clade: Eudicots
- Clade: Asterids
- Order: Asterales
- Family: Asteraceae
- Genus: Balduina
- Species: B. uniflora

Binomial name
- Balduina uniflora Nutt.

Synonyms
- Balduina lutea Raf.; Baldwinia uniflora Nutt.; Endorima modesta Raf.; Endorima uniflora (Nutt.) Raf.; Endorima uniflora (Nutt.) Barnhart

= Balduina uniflora =

Species of flowering plant

Balduina uniflora, commonly called oneflower honeycombhead, savannah honeycombhead or oneflower balduina, is a North American species of plants in the sunflower family. It is native to the southeastern United States (Louisiana, Florida, Georgia, Alabama, Mississippi, South Carolina, North Carolina). It is the type species of the genus Balduina.

Balduina uniflora is a perennial herb with branching stems. Each plant has 1-4 flower heads, each with 8-22 yellow ray florets and 50-180 orange or yellow disc florets. The species grows in wet pinelands and savannahs, as well as wetland areas and on the edges of bogs and tends to occur in wet drainage ditches and on roadsides.

== Description ==
Balduina uniflora is a perennial herbaceous plant and can grow to be 0.4 to 1 meter (1 to 3 ft) tall. It has fibrous roots and erect stems, and the stems are ribbed. Stems also tend to be branched, except for those that bear flower heads. Leaves, stems, involucres, and peduncles are green and pubescent, except for the bottoms of leaves which may be glabrous or with only sparse hair. Leaves are alternate and tend to be clustered at the base of the plant, getting smaller and more sparse as they reach the apex.

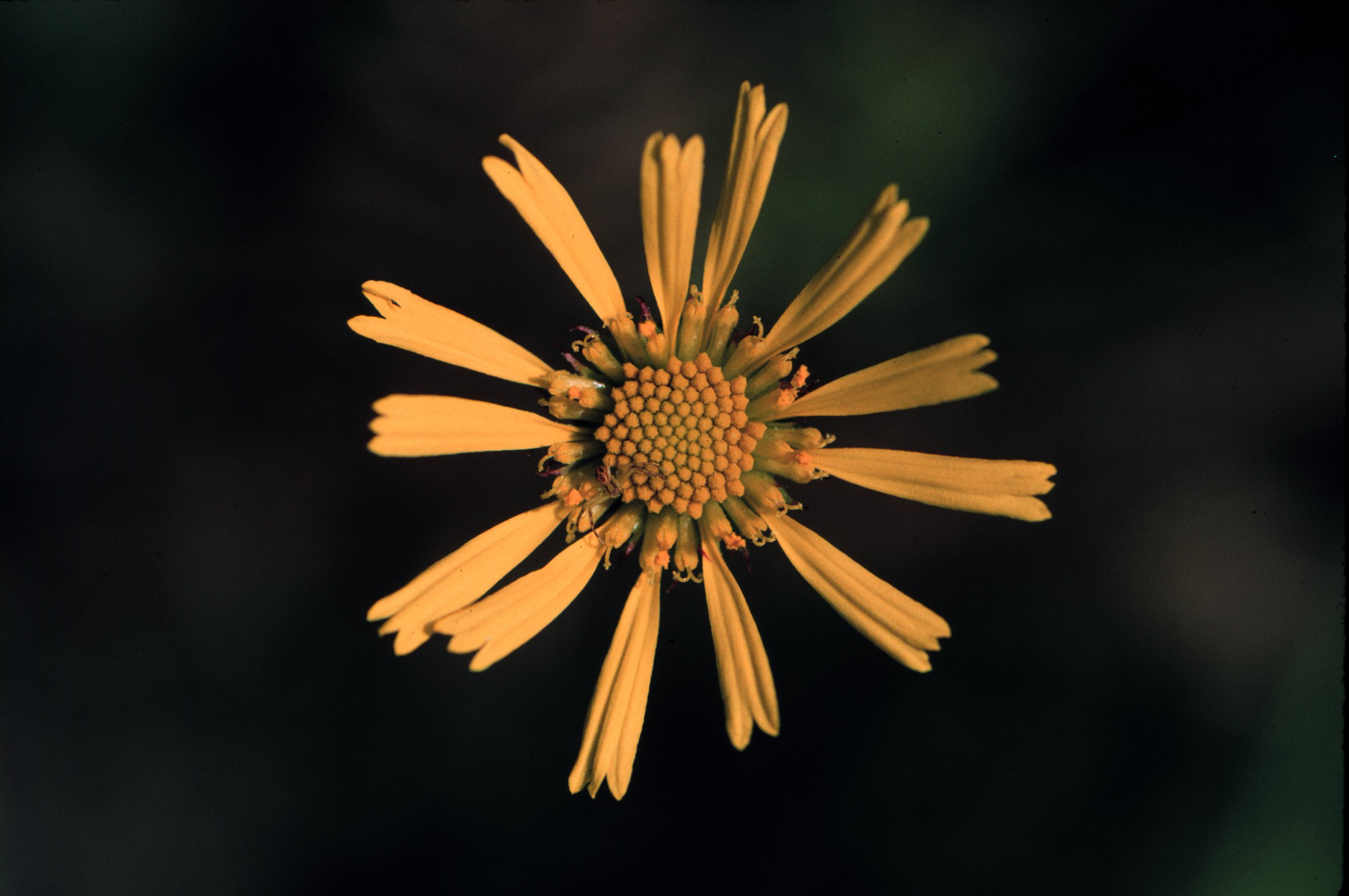
Photo of Balduina uniflora showing characteristic honeycomb-like clusters of disc flowers, each surrounded by receptacular bracts.

Like other members of family Asteraceae, the "flowers" of this species are actually inflorescences called flower heads, composed of hundreds of individual flowers. The inflorescence has many bracts at its base forming a green bell-shaped or hemispheric involucre. The yellow petal-like ray florets are sterile and tend to have 3-5 lobes at the edge. The more central disc florets are perfect, containing several arrow-shaped stamen as well as a pistil made up of two ovaries. Each pistil has a yellow two-branched style which extends out of the floret. The plant gets its name from characteristic honeycomb-like bract structures (chaff) most visible at fruit maturity.

Also like others in the Asteraceae family, B. uniflora bears achene-like cypselae: dry, indehiscent fruits with a single seed that develops from the two carpals of the flower. This fruit is generally 1.3-2.2mm in length.

This species differs from others in the genus Balduina by its wider corolla rays, larger pollen grains, and by having chromosome arrangement of n=36 rather than n=18 in other species.

== Cultivation ==
Balduina uniflora is not usually a commercially available species, but may be grown from seeds for ornamental purposes in native wildflower gardens. The species prefers wet and boggy soils as well as high levels of sunlight.

== Possible polyploidy ==
A 1975 study of Balduina conducted by Earl S. Parker and Samuel B. Jones found a chromosomal arrangement of n=36 in B. uniflora collected across 16 different areas, which differed from the n=18 arrangement of the other two species in the Balduina genus, leading to the theory that the species is a widespread polyploid. No assumptions as to whether this chromosomal arrangement was allopolyploid or autopolyploid in origin were made.

== Ecology ==
Balduina uniflora is currently not listed by the IUCN Red List.

This species is listed by the NatureServe organization as "Apparently Secure (S4)" nationwide, but as "Vulnerable (S3)" and "Imperiled (S2)" in North and South Carolina, respectively.

This species is not known to be invasive in any U.S. State.
