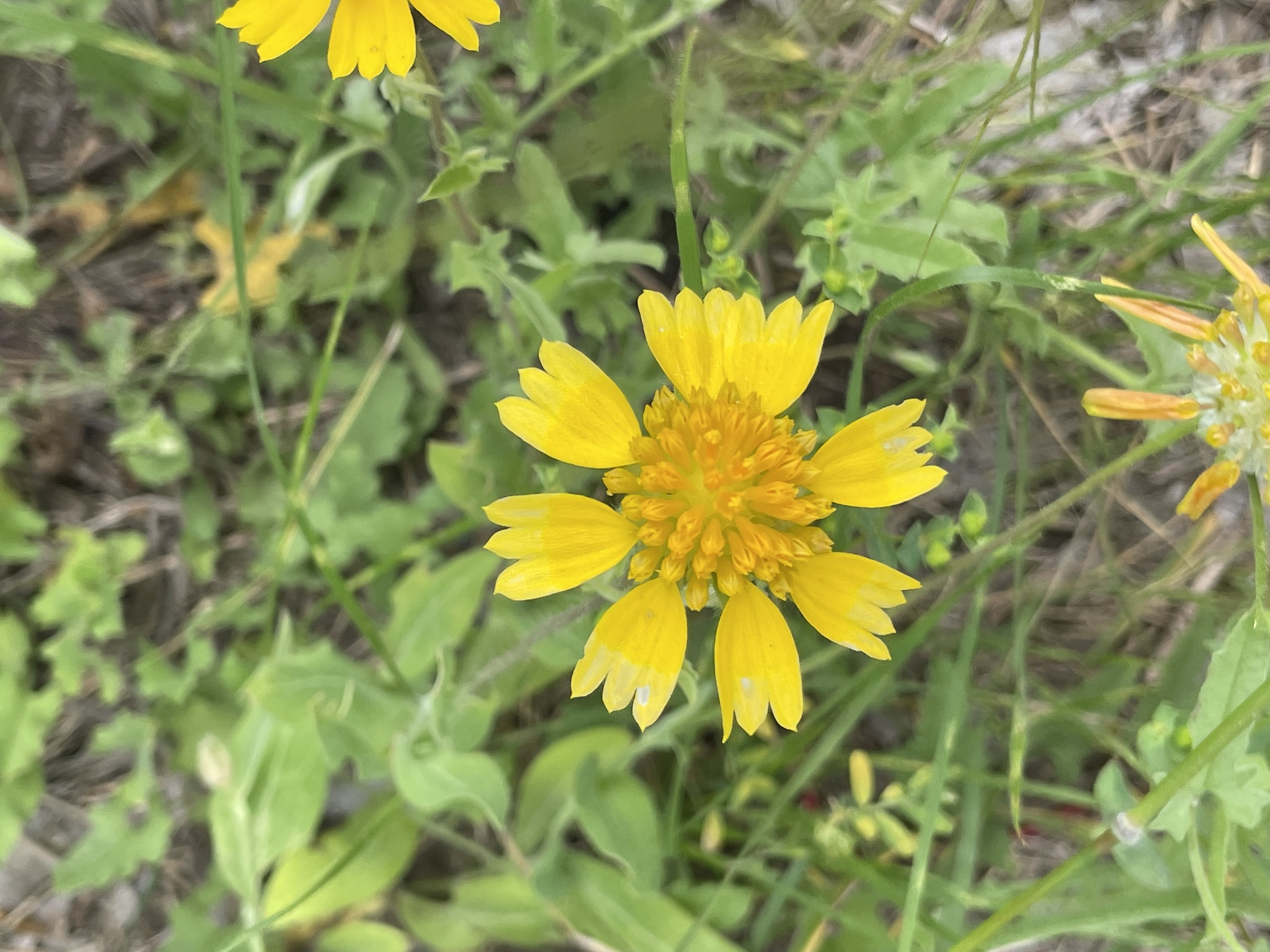
- Amblyolepis setigera in Texas

Scientific classification
- Kingdom: Plantae
- Clade: Tracheophytes
- Clade: Angiosperms
- Clade: Eudicots
- Clade: Asterids
- Order: Asterales
- Family: Asteraceae
- Subfamily: Asteroideae
- Tribe: Helenieae
- Subtribe: Tetraneurinae
- Genus: Amblyolepis; DC.
- Species: A. setigera

Binomial name
- Amblyolepis setigera DC.

Synonyms
- Helenium Linnaeus section Amblyolepis (de Candolle) Bentham; Helenium setigerum (DC.) Britton & Rusby

= Amblyolepis =

Genus of flowering plants

Amblyolepis is a genus of flowering plants in the daisy family described as a genus in 1836.

There is only one known species, Amblyolepis setigera, the Huisache daisy, native to Texas and northeastern Mexico (Tamaulipas, Nuevo León, Coahuila).
