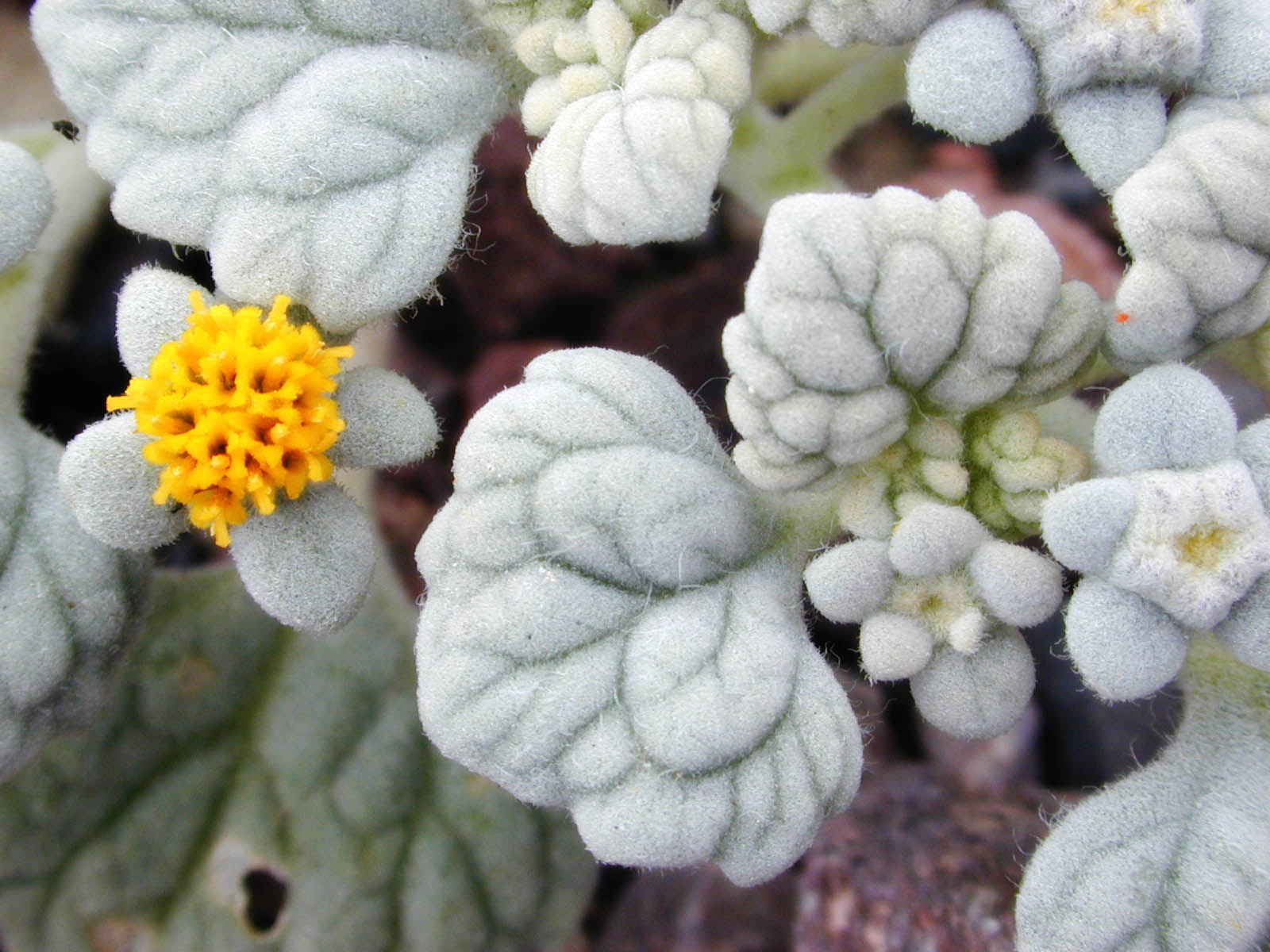
- Psathyrotes ramosissima

Scientific classification
- Kingdom: Plantae
- Clade: Tracheophytes
- Clade: Angiosperms
- Clade: Eudicots
- Clade: Asterids
- Order: Asterales
- Family: Asteraceae
- Subfamily: Asteroideae
- Tribe: Helenieae
- Subtribe: Psathyrotinae
- Genus: Psathyrotes; A.Gray

Type species
- Psathyrotes annua (Nutt.) A.Gray

Synonyms
- Bulbostylis sect. Psathyrotus Nutt.; Pseudobartlettia Rydb.

= Psathyrotes =

Genus of plants

Psathyrotes is a genus of North American plants in the sneezeweed tribe within the sunflower family. It contains annual and perennial forbs and low subshrubs native to dry areas of southwestern North America. Common names include turtleback, brittlestem, and fanleaf.

The plants are low, densely branching, hairy, and scaly, with a turpentine-like odor. Leaves are alternate and hairy. The Latin name of the genus (from the Greek psathurotes) refers to the brittleness of the stems.

Species

- Psathyrotes annua (Nutt.) Gray (annual psathyrotes, mealy rosettes, turtleback) - CA NV UT AZ ID
  - Synonyms: Bulbostylis annua Nutt.
  - Annual or perennial forb
- Psathyrotes pilifera Gray (hairy-beast turtleback, hairybeast brittlestem) - NV UT AZ
  - Annual forb
- Psathyrotes ramosissima (Torr.) Gray (velvet rosette, velvet turtleback, turtleback) - NV UT AZ CA, Baja California, Sonora
  - Synonyms: Tetradymia ramosissima Torr.
  - Annual or perennial forb or subshrub

formerly included

see Peucephyllum Psathyrotopsis Trichoptilium

- Psathyrotes incisa A.Gray - Trichoptilium incisum (A.Gray) A.Gray
- Psathyrotes purpusii Brandegee - Psathyrotopsis purpusii (Brandegee) Rydb.
- Psathyrotes scaposa A.Gray - Psathyrotopsis scaposa (A.Gray) H.Rob.
- Psathyrotes schottii (A.Gray) A.Gray - Peucephyllum schottii A.Gray
