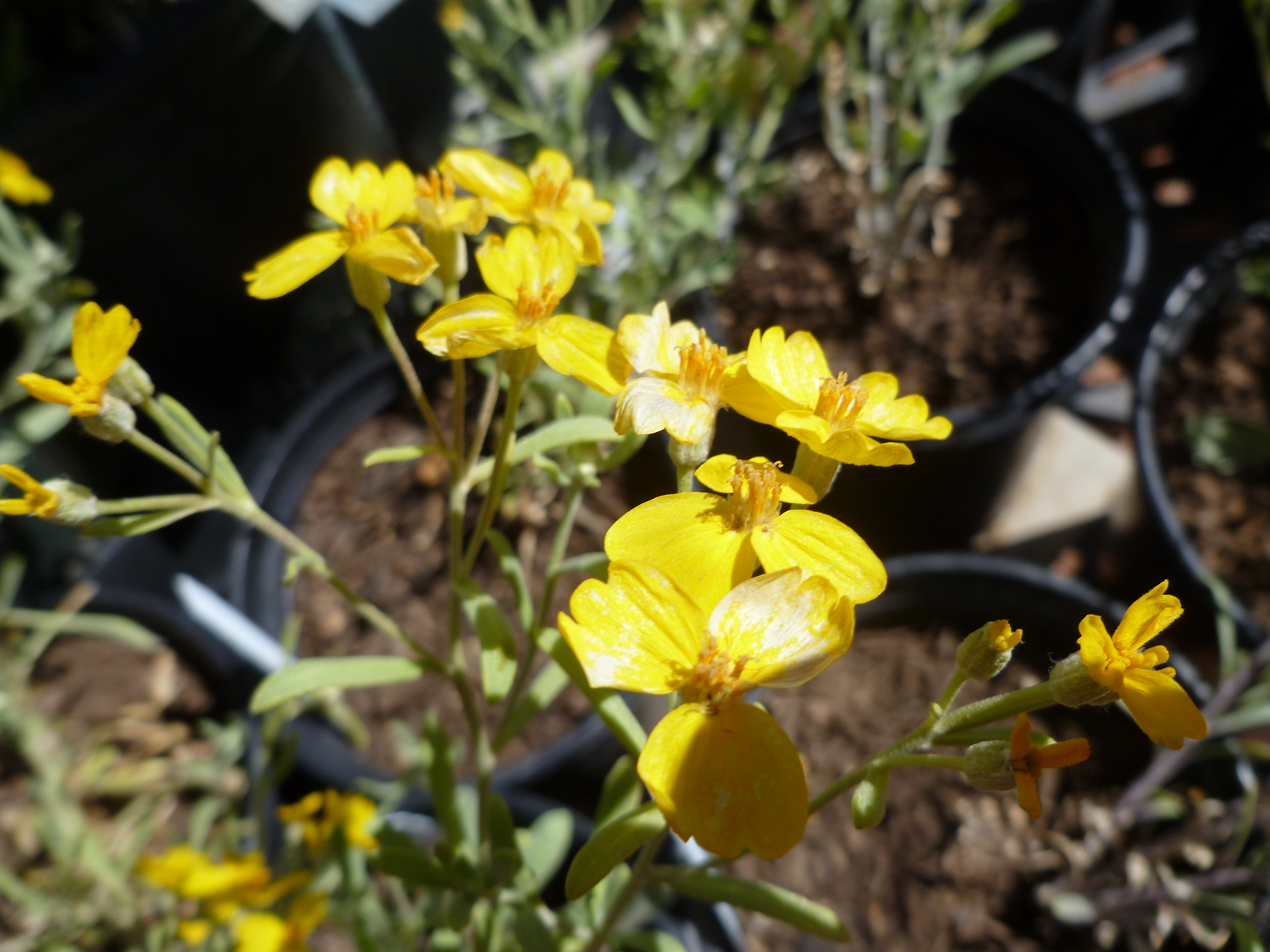

Scientific classification
- Kingdom: Plantae
- Clade: Tracheophytes
- Clade: Angiosperms
- Clade: Eudicots
- Clade: Asterids
- Order: Asterales
- Family: Asteraceae
- Genus: Psilostrophe
- Species: P. tagetina

Binomial name
- Psilostrophe tagetina (Nutt.) Greene

Varieties
- Psilostrophe tagetina var. cerifera Psilostrophe tagetina var. tagetina

= Psilostrophe tagetina =

Species of plant

Psilostrophe tagetina is a flowering plant in the daisy family known by the common name woolly paperflower. It is native to Arizona, Colorado, Kansas, New Mexico, Oklahoma, Texas, Utah, and northwestern Mexico.

== Uses ==
Ramah Navajo use a strong infusion as cathartic, also used to treat stomachache, as an eyewash, as a lotion for itching, or in cold infusion gargled or in poultice of leaves applied for sore throat. Keres, Zuni and White Mountain Apache use flowers to make yellow dye. Zuni also make a compound poultice of root to treat rattlesnake bite.
