= Psilostrophe villosa =

Scientific classification
- Kingdom: Plantae
- Clade: Tracheophytes
- Clade: Angiosperms
- Clade: Eudicots
- Clade: Asterids
- Order: Asterales
- Family: Asteraceae
- Genus: Psilostrophe
- Species: P. villosa

Binomial name
- Psilostrophe villosa Rydb.

Synonyms
- Psilostrophe cerifera A.Nelson; Psilostrophe tagetina var. cerifera (A.Nelson) B.L.Turner; Psilostrophe cerifera var. biennis A.Nelson; Psilostrophe cerifera var. cerifera

Species of flowering plant

Psilostrophe villosa, the woolly paperflower, is a species of flowering plant from the United States and Mexico.
