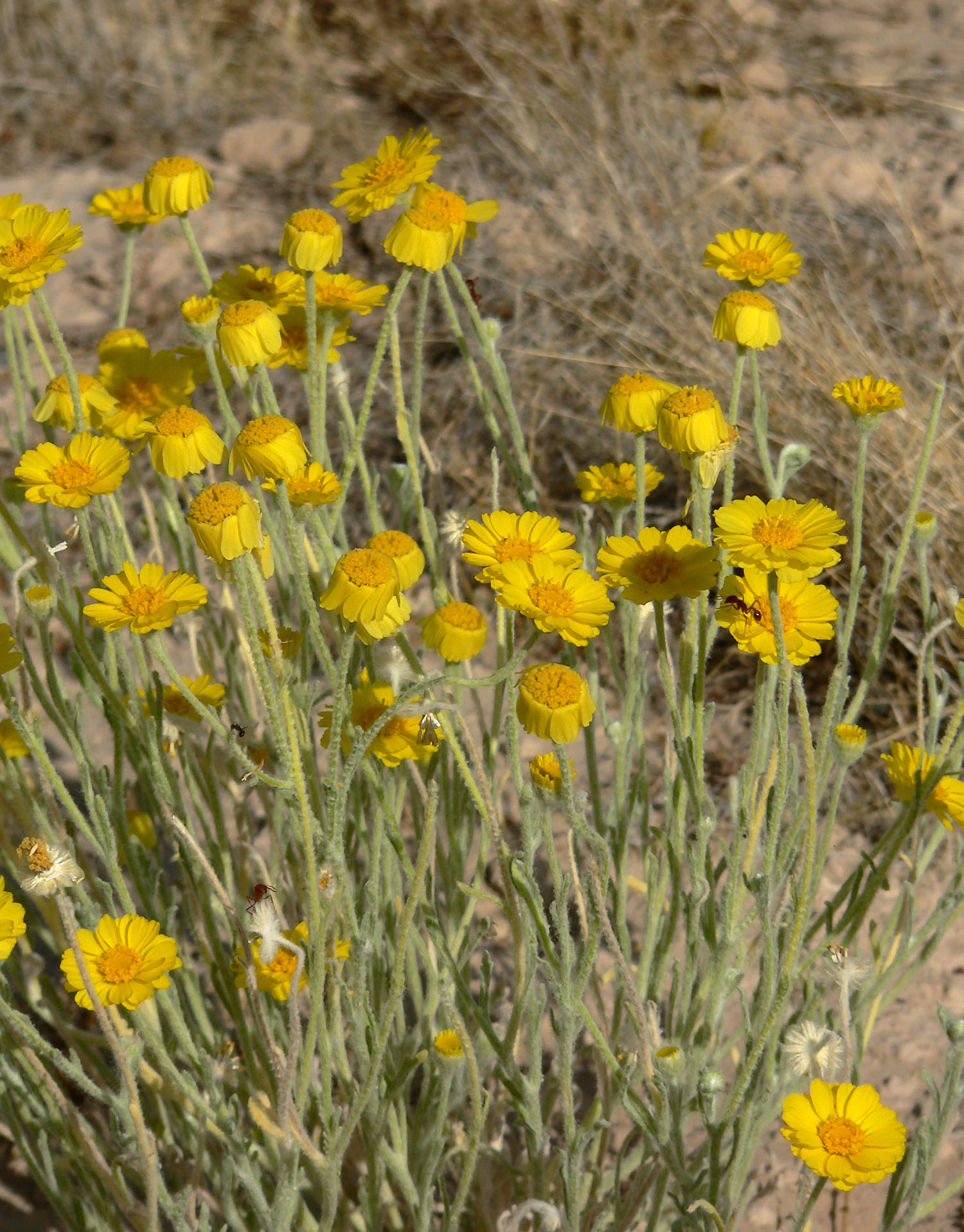

Scientific classification
- Kingdom: Plantae
- Clade: Tracheophytes
- Clade: Angiosperms
- Clade: Eudicots
- Clade: Asterids
- Order: Asterales
- Family: Asteraceae
- Genus: Baileya
- Species: B. pleniradiata

Binomial name
- Baileya pleniradiata Harvey & A.Gray

Synonyms
- Baileya multiradiata var. perennis (A.Nelson) Kittell; Baileya multiradiata var. pleniradiata Coville; Baileya nervosa M.E.Jones; Baileya perennis (A.Nelson) Rydb.; Baileya pleniradiata var. perennis A.Nelson; Baileya pleniradiata var. thurberi Rydb.

= Baileya pleniradiata =

Species of flowering plant

Baileya pleniradiata is a North American species of flowering plant in the daisy family, Asteraceae. It is known by the common name woolly desert marigold. It is native to desert regions of the southwestern United States and northern Mexico, where it grows in sandy habitats. It has been found in the States of Chihuahua, Sonora, Baja California, Arizona, Utah, and Nevada.

== Description ==
Baileya pleniradiata is an annual herb producing a light gray-green to nearly white woolly branching stem up to half a meter in height. The leaves are up to 8 centimeters long and may split into a few lobes.

Each inflorescence is composed of a single flower head which is borne on a peduncle up to 10 centimeters (4 inches) long. The flower head has a center of yellow disc florets surrounded by a fringe of ray florets, sometimes in two or more layers, each bright yellow and up to a centimeter in length. The fruit is a sharply angled achene a few millimeters long.
