= Psilostrophe sparsiflora =

Scientific classification
- Kingdom: Plantae
- Clade: Tracheophytes
- Clade: Angiosperms
- Clade: Eudicots
- Clade: Asterids
- Order: Asterales
- Family: Asteraceae
- Genus: Psilostrophe
- Species: P. sparsiflora

Binomial name
- Psilostrophe sparsiflora (A.Gray) A.Nelson

Synonyms
- Psilostrophe tagetina var. sparsiflora (A.Gray) Greene; Riddellia tagetina var. sparsiflora A.Gray

Species of flowering plant

Psilostrophe sparsiflora, the greenstem paperflower, is a species of flowering plant from the United States.
