= Psilostrophe gnaphalodes =

Scientific classification
- Kingdom: Plantae
- Clade: Tracheophytes
- Clade: Angiosperms
- Clade: Eudicots
- Clade: Asterids
- Order: Asterales
- Family: Asteraceae
- Genus: Psilostrophe
- Species: P. gnaphalodes

Binomial name
- Psilostrophe gnaphalodes DC.

Synonyms
- Riddellia gnaphalioides (DC.) O.Hoffm.

Species of flowering plant

Psilostrophe gnaphalodes is a species of flowering plant native to the United States and Mexico.
