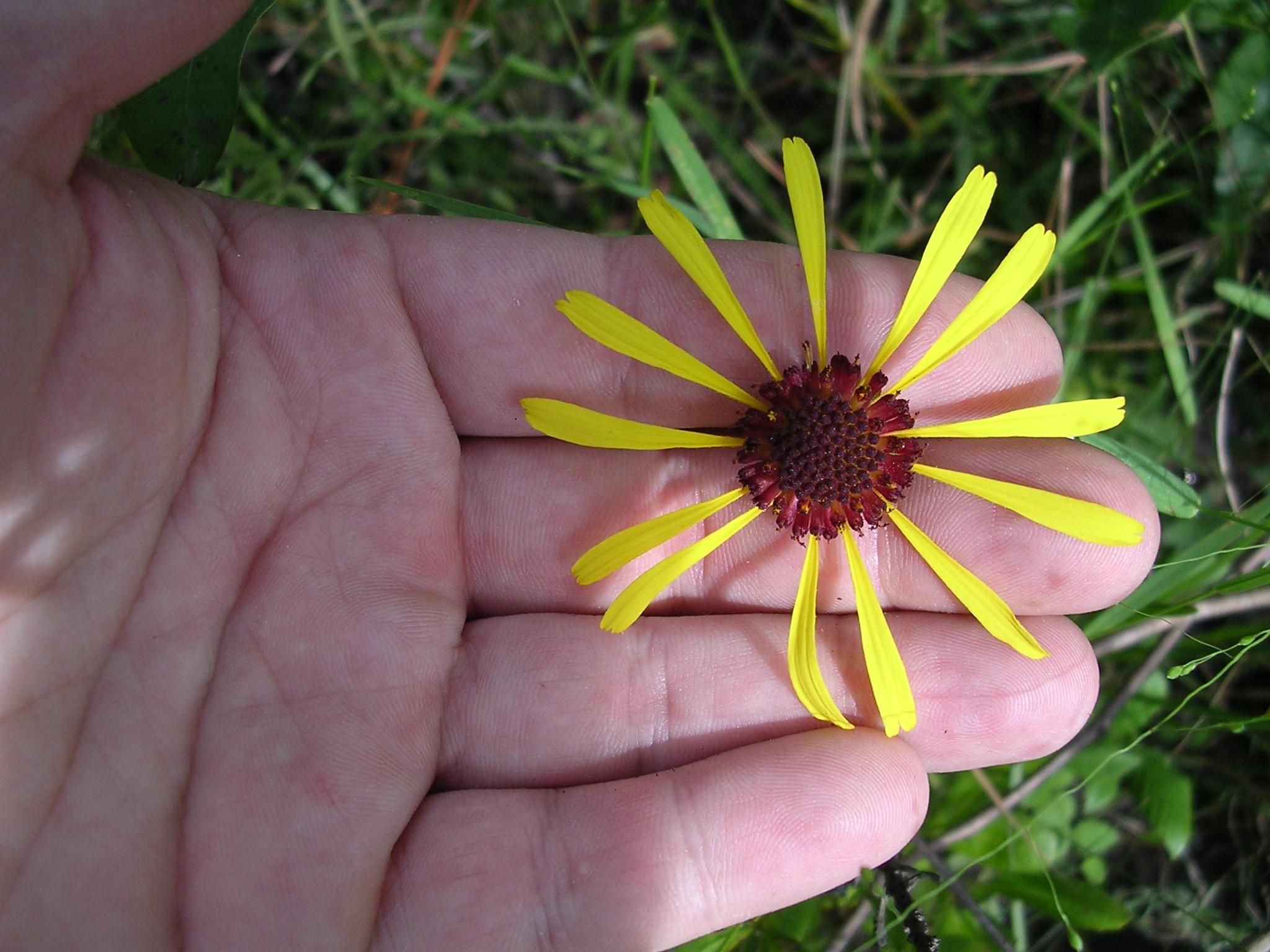

Conservation status
- Imperiled (NatureServe)

Scientific classification
- Kingdom: Plantae
- Clade: Tracheophytes
- Clade: Angiosperms
- Clade: Eudicots
- Clade: Asterids
- Order: Asterales
- Family: Asteraceae
- Genus: Balduina
- Species: B. atropurpurea

Binomial name
- Balduina atropurpurea R.M.Harper

Synonyms
- Baldwinia atropurpurea R.M. Harper; Endorima atropurpurea Small

= Balduina atropurpurea =

Species of flowering plant

Balduina atropurpurea, the purpledisk honeycombhead, is a North American species of plants in the sunflower family. It is native to the southeastern United States (Florida, Georgia, Alabama, South Carolina, North Carolina).

Balduina atropurpurea is a perennial herb with branching stems. Each plant has 1-4 flower heads, each with yellow ray florets and purple disc florets. The species grows in pinelands and savannahs.
