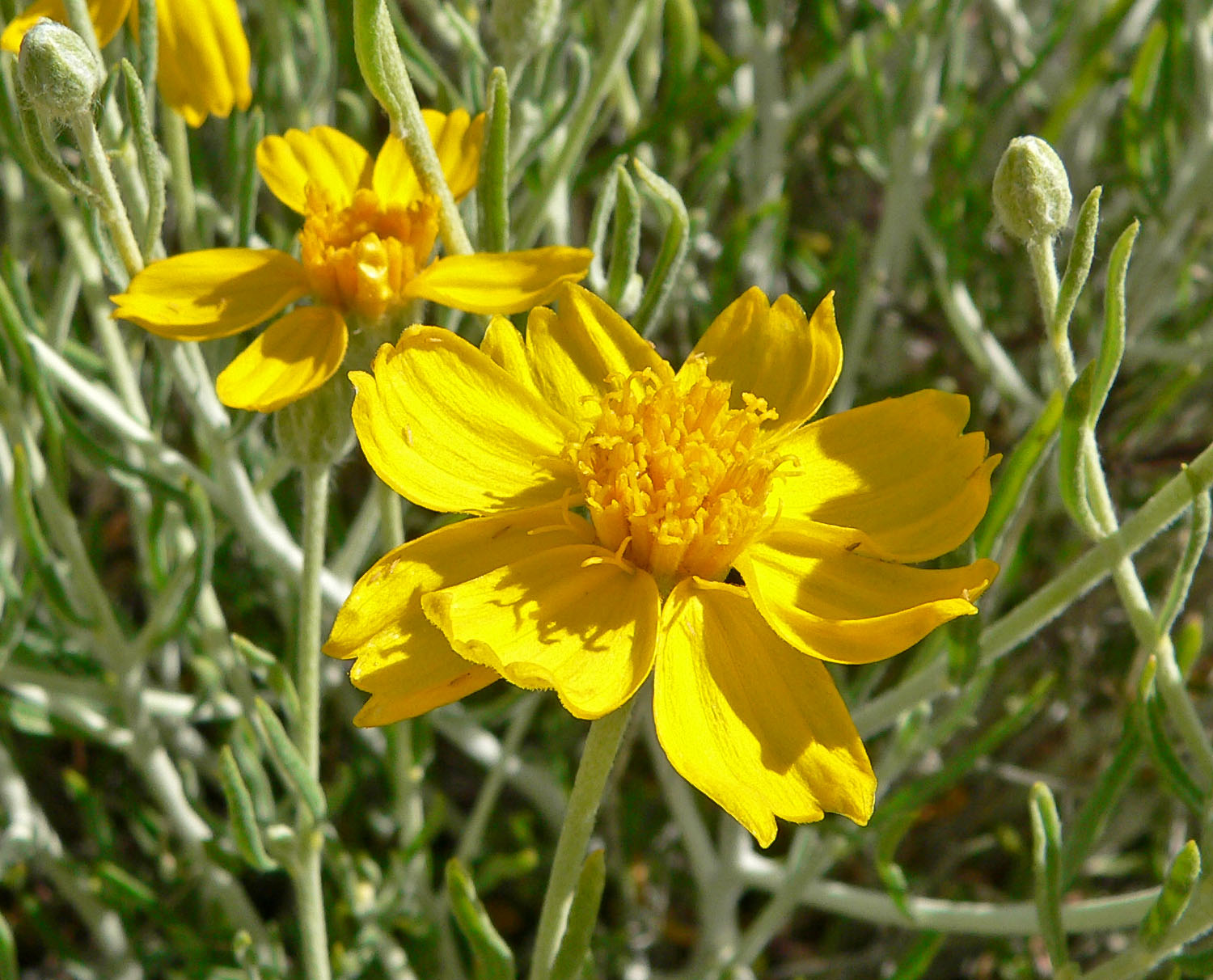

Scientific classification
- Kingdom: Plantae
- Clade: Tracheophytes
- Clade: Angiosperms
- Clade: Eudicots
- Clade: Asterids
- Order: Asterales
- Family: Asteraceae
- Genus: Psilostrophe
- Species: P. cooperi

Binomial name
- Psilostrophe cooperi (A.Gray) Greene

= Psilostrophe cooperi =

Species of plant

Psilostrophe cooperi is a flowering plant in the daisy family known by the common names Cooper's paper daisy and whitestem paperflower. It is native to the Mojave and Sonoran Deserts of California, the Southwestern United States, and northwestern Mexico.

== Description ==
P. cooperi is perennial shrub growing up to 50 centimetres (20 in) tall Its stems rise from a woody base to form that a nearly spherical form. It is a low, spreading bush with pale green, hairy foliage. It is drought deciduous, dropping its leaves in times of drought. The linear leaves are alternate.

The daisylike flower heads have 3 to 8 deeply toothed golden-yellow ray florets. The flower heads are often bunched together at the tops of the stems in a rounded spray. The ray flowers persist for a time and then dry and become papery while maintaining their yellow color. The 3 toothed corollas of the dried ray flowers fold back over the phyllaries.

Several related species are poisonous to livestock.
