= Psilostrophe bakeri =

Scientific classification
- Kingdom: Plantae
- Clade: Tracheophytes
- Clade: Angiosperms
- Clade: Eudicots
- Clade: Asterids
- Order: Asterales
- Family: Asteraceae
- Genus: Psilostrophe
- Species: P. bakeri

Binomial name
- Psilostrophe bakeri Greene

Synonyms
- Psilostrophe pumila Jones ex A.Nelson

Species of flowering plant

Psilostrophe bakeri, the Colorado paperflower, is a species of flowering plant native to the United States.
