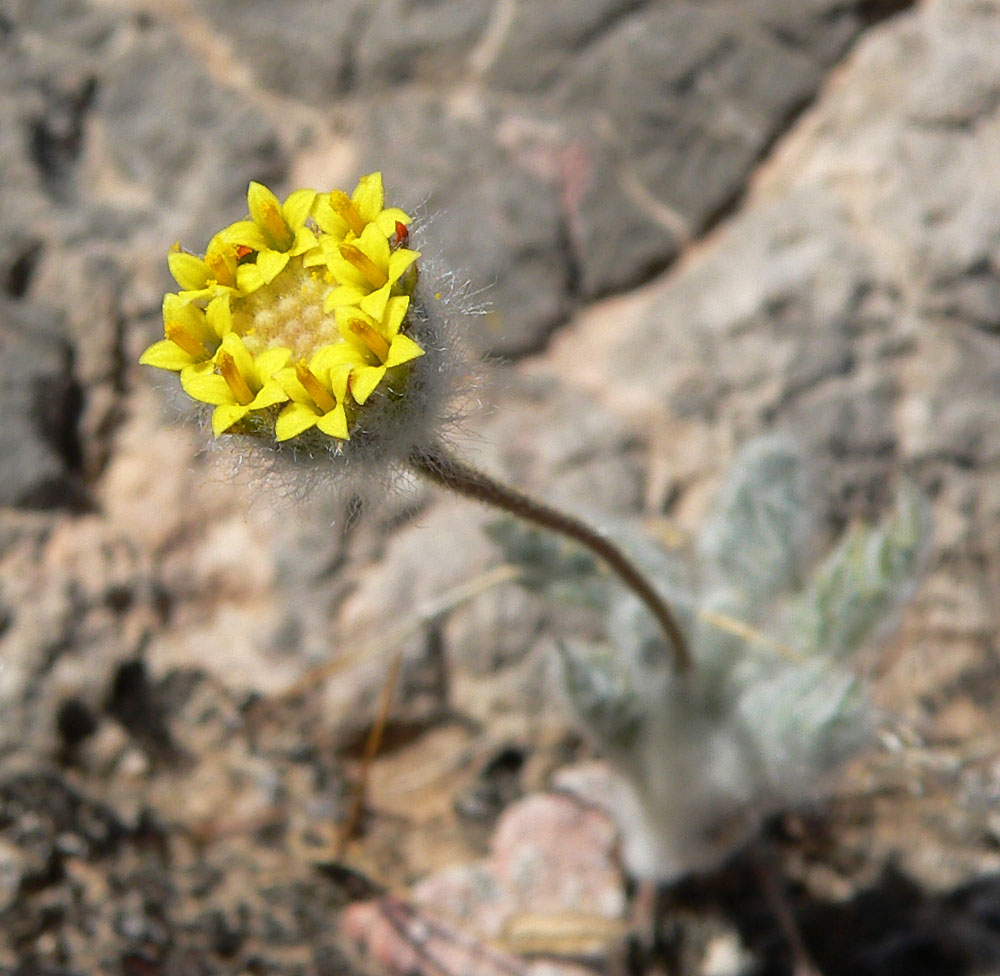

Conservation status
- Apparently Secure (NatureServe)

Scientific classification
- Kingdom: Plantae
- Clade: Tracheophytes
- Clade: Angiosperms
- Clade: Eudicots
- Clade: Asterids
- Order: Asterales
- Family: Asteraceae
- Subfamily: Asteroideae
- Tribe: Helenieae
- Subtribe: Psathyrotinae
- Genus: Trichoptilium; A. Gray
- Species: T. incisum

Binomial name
- Trichoptilium incisum A.Gray

= Trichoptilium =

Genus of flowering plants

Trichoptilium is a monotypic genus in the daisy family containing the single species Trichoptilium incisum, which is known by the common names yellowdome and yellowhead.

== Description ==
Trichoptilium incisum grows up to 20 centimetres (8 in) tall. It sends up stems from a basal rosette of sharply toothed leaves which are up to 5 cm (2 in) long and covered in curly hairs and oil glands. Atop each stem is a rounded bright yellow flower head about 1.5 cm (1/2 in) wide with only disc florets. Each head is a hemispherical button about 1 cm in diameter. The fruit is bristly with pappus.

== Distribution and habitat ==
The plant is native to the Mojave and Sonoran Desert regions of the United States and Mexico.

It appears in late winter, and depending on rain, sometimes in autumn.
