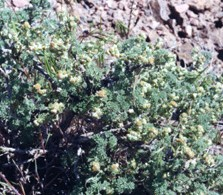
- Arches National Park, Utah

Conservation status
- Secure (NatureServe)

Scientific classification
- Kingdom: Plantae
- Clade: Embryophytes
- Clade: Tracheophytes
- Clade: Angiosperms
- Clade: Eudicots
- Clade: Asterids
- Order: Asterales
- Family: Asteraceae
- Genus: Artemisia
- Species: A. spinescens

Binomial name
- Artemisia spinescens D.C.Eaton

Synonyms
- Picrothamnus desertorum Nutt. 1841 not Artemisia desertorum Spreng. 1826

= Artemisia spinescens =

Species of flowering plant

Artemisia spinescens is a North American species of sagebrush in the sunflower family, known by the common name budsage.

Many sources treat the species separately from genus Artemisia and named Picrothamnus desertorum. This separation has not, however, been supported by genetic analysis.

== Distribution and habitat ==
Artemisia spinescens is native to the western United States from southern and eastern California and the Great Basin, north to Idaho and Montana, and east to western Colorado and northwestern New Mexico.

Artemisia spinescens grows in scrub and other habitat on clay and gravel-rich soils. It thrives on salty soils, growing with other salt-tolerant plants such as saltbushes ('Atriplex sp.). It is adapted to very dry climates.

== Description ==
Artemisia spinescens is a squat shrub forming a rounded bush up to 30 to 50 centimeters in maximum height. Its tangled branches are woolly when new and thorny and rough when aged. The stem is woody and corky.

The strongly aromatic foliage is made up of many small, fuzzy leaves divided into narrow, pointed segments. It is deciduous, dropping its leaves during the dry summer when it becomes dormant.

The inflorescence is a raceme of small clusters of flower heads sprouting from leaf axils. Each head contains several tiny bell-shaped sterile disc florets and a few fertile ray florets.

The fruit is a tiny hairy achene less than a millimeter long.

== Uses ==
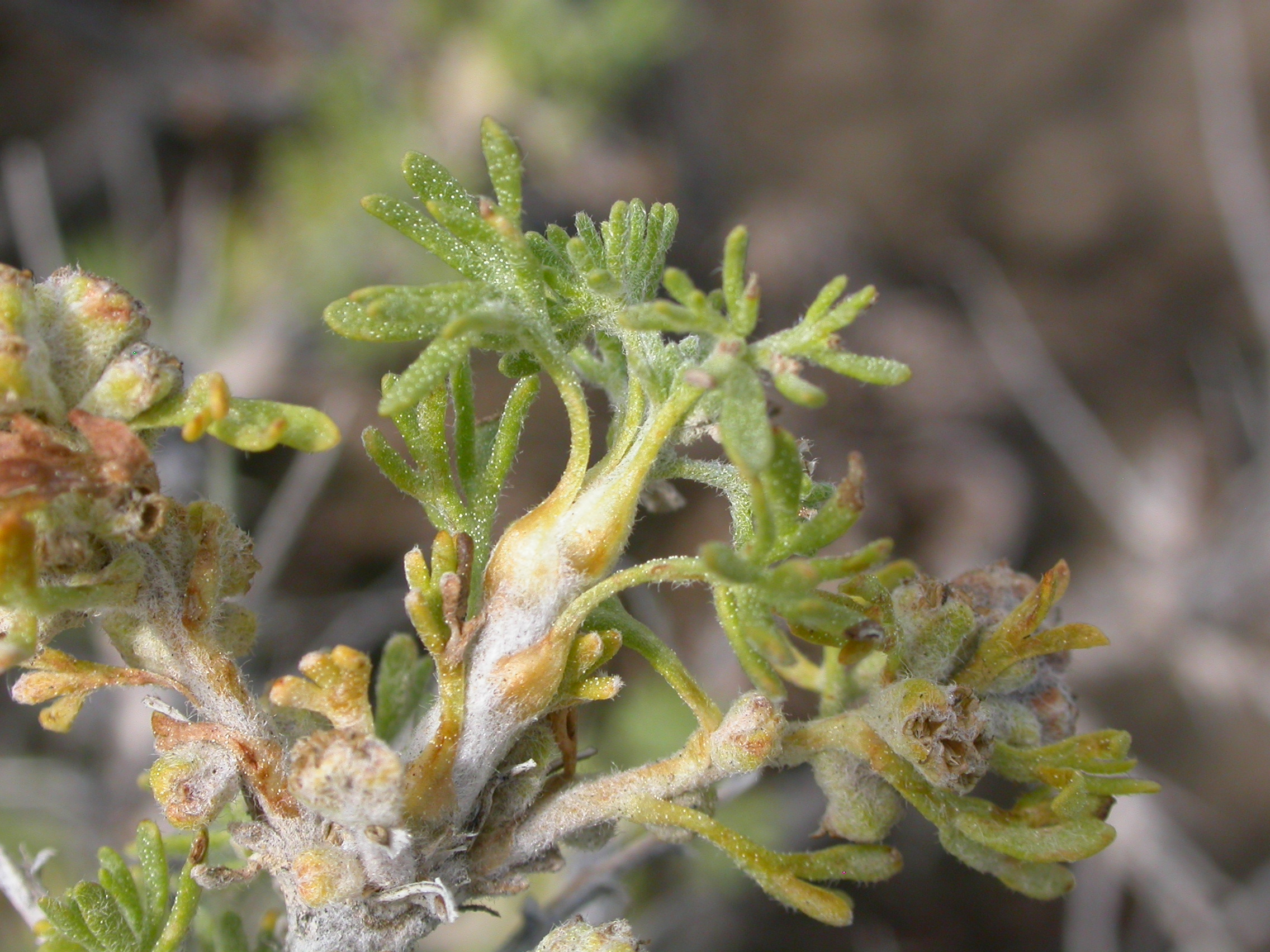
Leaves

This plant is considered good forage for wild and domestic grazing animals early in the season when the foliage is new and soft. Later in the season when the plant produces large quantities of bitter volatile oils it becomes unpalatable.
