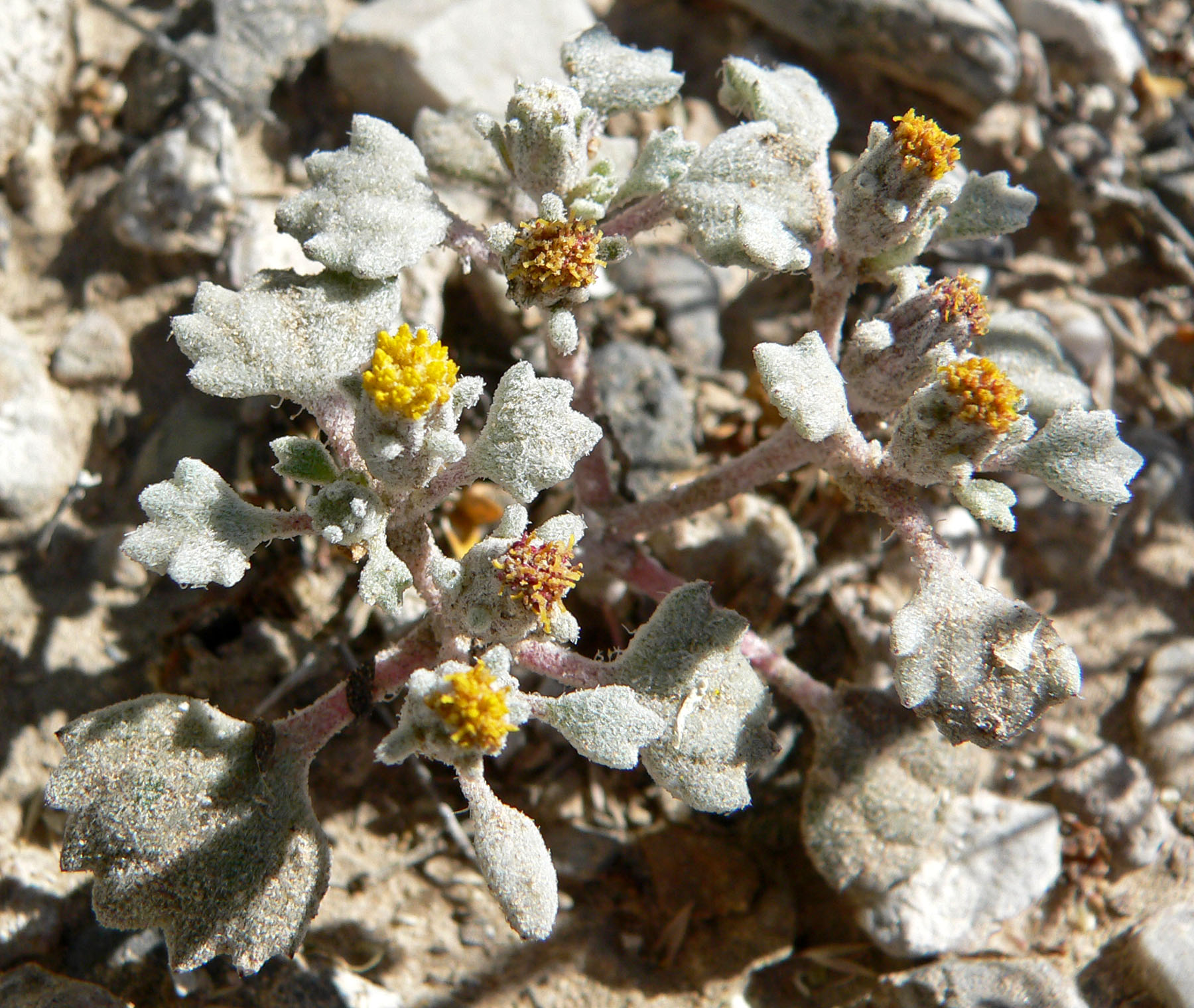

Scientific classification
- Kingdom: Plantae
- Clade: Embryophytes
- Clade: Tracheophytes
- Clade: Spermatophytes
- Clade: Angiosperms
- Clade: Eudicots
- Clade: Asterids
- Order: Asterales
- Family: Asteraceae
- Genus: Psathyrotes
- Species: P. annua

Binomial name
- Psathyrotes annua (Nutt.) A.Gray

Synonyms
- Bulbostylis annua

= Psathyrotes annua =

Species of plant

Psathyrotes annua is a species of flowering plant in the aster family known by the common names annual psathyrotes, turtleback, or mealy rosettes. It is native to the southwestern United States and as far north as Idaho. It grows in desert and scrub habitat, often in areas with alkali soils among plants such as shadscale. It is a low, flat or mounding plant with spreading, hairy, scaly stems. It is pale green to reddish purple in color with gray-green leaves, its color dull from the coating of fibers on its surface. The irregularly rounded leaf blades are up to 1.6 centimeters long with wavy or toothed edges. The knobby inflorescence arises from the leaf axils. It is lined with hairy gray-green phyllaries with dull points that curve outward. It contains several hairy yellow to reddish disc florets. The fruit is an achene covered densely in long hairs and tipped with a large pappus of bristles.
