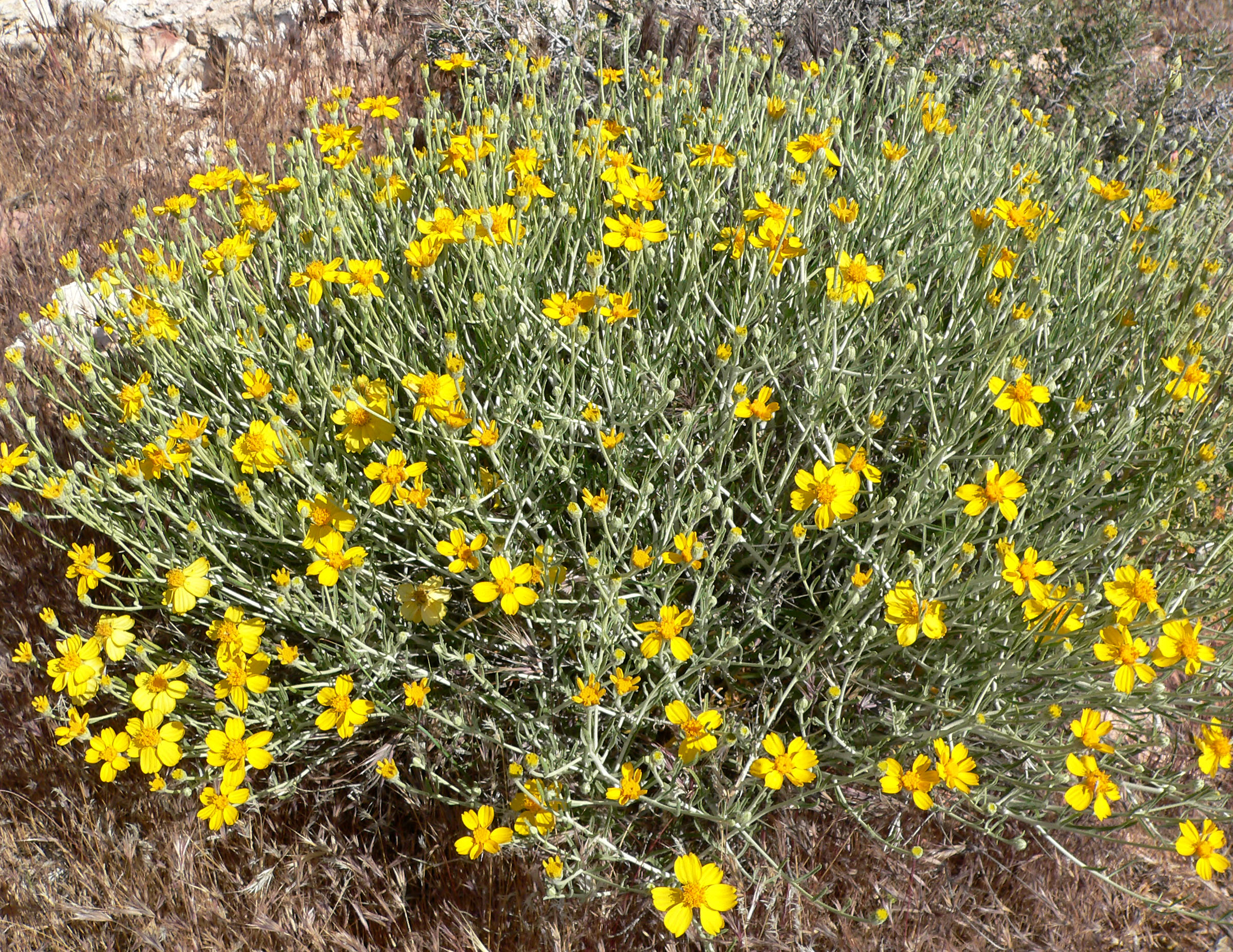
- Psilostrophe cooperi

Scientific classification
- Kingdom: Plantae
- Clade: Tracheophytes
- Clade: Angiosperms
- Clade: Eudicots
- Clade: Asterids
- Order: Asterales
- Family: Asteraceae
- Subfamily: Asteroideae
- Tribe: Helenieae
- Subtribe: Tetraneurinae
- Genus: Psilostrophe; DC.

Type species
- Psilostrophe gnaphalodes DC.

Synonyms
- Riddellia Nutt.

= Psilostrophe =

Genus of plants

Psilostrophe, the paperflowers, is a genus of North American plants in the sneezeweed tribe within the sunflower family.

Species

- Psilostrophe bakeri Greene - ID UT WY CO
- Psilostrophe cooperi (A.Gray) Greene - CA NV AZ UT NM, Baja California, Baja California Sur, Sonora
- Psilostrophe gnaphalodes DC. - TX, San Luis Potosí, Chihuahua, Coahuila, Durango, Nuevo León, Tamaulipas, Zacatecas
- Psilostrophe mexicana R.C.Br. - Chihuahua, Durango
- Psilostrophe sparsiflora (A.Gray) A.Nelson - green-stem paperflower, AZ UT NM
- Psilostrophe tagetina (Nutt.) Greene - marigold paperflower, AZ UT NM CO TX, Chihuahua, Coahuila
- Psilostrophe villosa Rydb. ex Britton - NM TX OK KS
