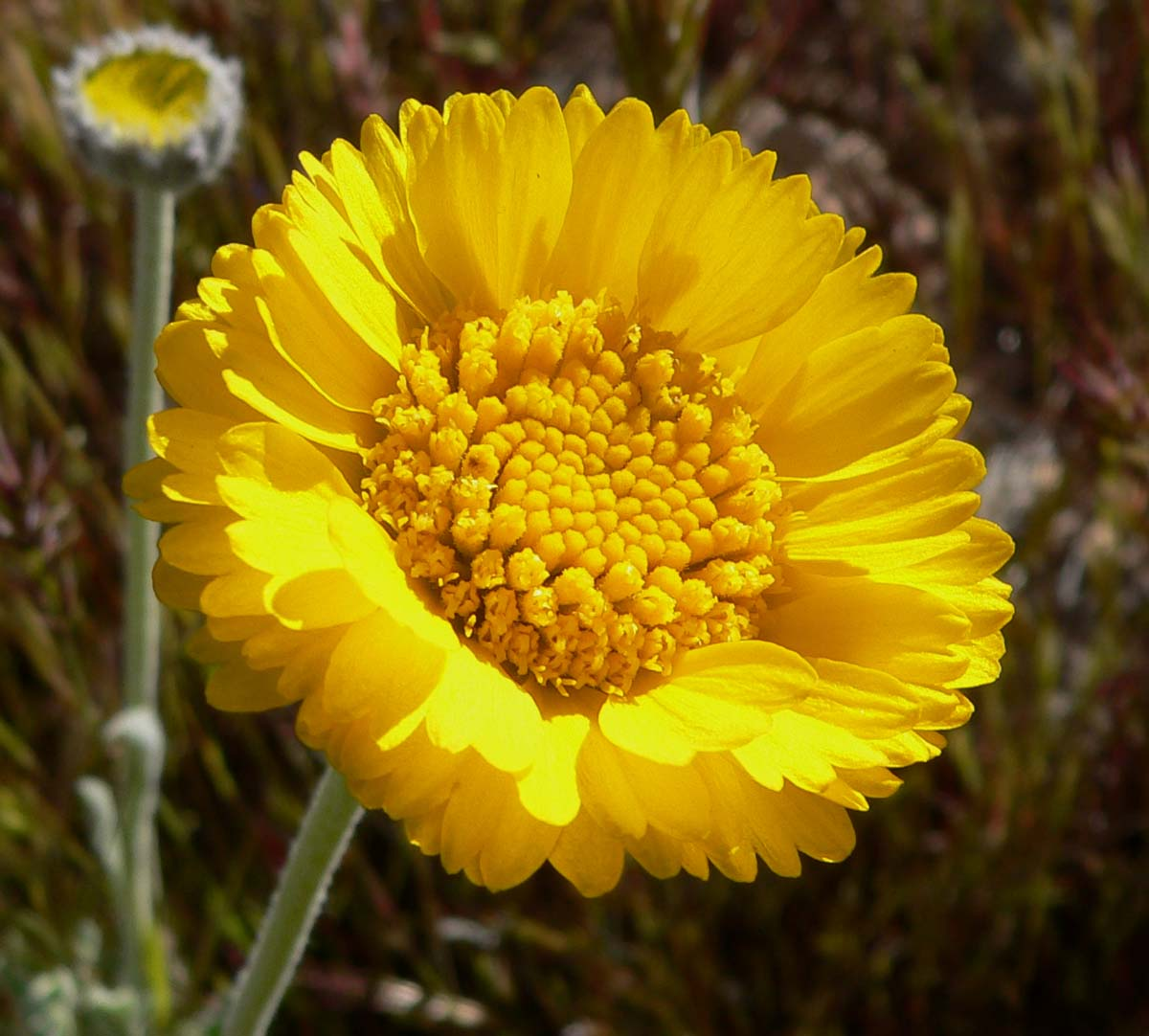
- Baileya multiradiata

Scientific classification
- Kingdom: Plantae
- Clade: Embryophytes
- Clade: Tracheophytes
- Clade: Spermatophytes
- Clade: Angiosperms
- Clade: Eudicots
- Clade: Asterids
- Order: Asterales
- Family: Asteraceae
- Subfamily: Asteroideae
- Tribe: Helenieae
- Subtribe: Tetraneurinae
- Genus: Baileya; Harvey & A.Gray ex Torrey, 1848

Type species
- Baileya multiradiata Harvey & A.Gray ex Torrey, 1848

= Baileya (plant) =

Genus of flowering plants

Baileya (the desert marigolds) is a genus of plants in the aster family Asteraceae. All are native to the southwestern United States and to Mexico.

They are typically annual, though B. multiradiata may be perennial. The leaves, which may range from being entire to deeply lobed, mostly occur in a basal cluster. From this arises several flower stems, up to 18 inches (50 cm) in height, usually carrying a single yellow radiate flower each, although B. pauciradiata may have 2–3 flowers on a stem.

Desert marigolds typically have their main bloom in the spring, extending through July. Summer thunderstorms may enable a second bloom in October and even into November.

Baileya species are used as food plants by the larvae of some Lepidoptera species including Schinia miniana (which feeds exclusively on the genus) and Schinia pallicincta (which feeds exclusively on B. pauciradiata).

The genus is named after US microscopist and West Point professor Jacob Whitman Bailey (1811–1857), known for his studies of diatoms.

== Species ==
As of July 2020 there are three accepted species in Baileya:
Binomial name	Authority	Common name	Synonyms	Distribution
Baileya multiradiata	Harv. & A.Gray ex Torr. (1848)	desert marigold	Baileya australis Rydb. (1914); Baileya multiradiata var. multiradiata Baileya multiradiata var. nudicaulis A.Gray; Baileya multiradiata var. thurberi (Rydb.) Kittell; Baileya pleniradiata var. multiradiata Kearney; Baileya thurberi Rydb.	California, Nevada, Arizona, New Mexico, southwestern Utah, western Texas, Sonora, Chihuahua, Coahuila, Durango, Aguascalientes
Baileya pauciradiata	Harvey & A.Gray (1849)	laxflower, Colorado desert marigold	no synonyms	southeastern California, western Arizona, southwestern Utah, Sonora, Baja California
Baileya pleniradiata	Harv. & A.Gray ex Harv. & A.Gray (1898)	woolly desert marigold	Baileya multiradiata var. perennis (A.Nelson) Kittell; Baileya multiradiata var. pleniradiata (Harv. & A.Gray ex A.Gray) Coville; Baileya nervosa M.E.Jones; Baileya perennis (A.Nelson) Rydb. Baileya pleniradiata var. perennis A.Nelson; Baileya pleniradiata var. pleniradiata Baileya pleniradiata var. thurberi Rydb.	California, southern Nevada, Arizona, southwestern Utah, Chihuahua, Sonora, Baja California
