= Tansyaster =

Tansyaster is a common name for several closely related plants and may refer to:

- Dieteria
- Machaeranthera
- Psilactis
- Rayjacksonia
