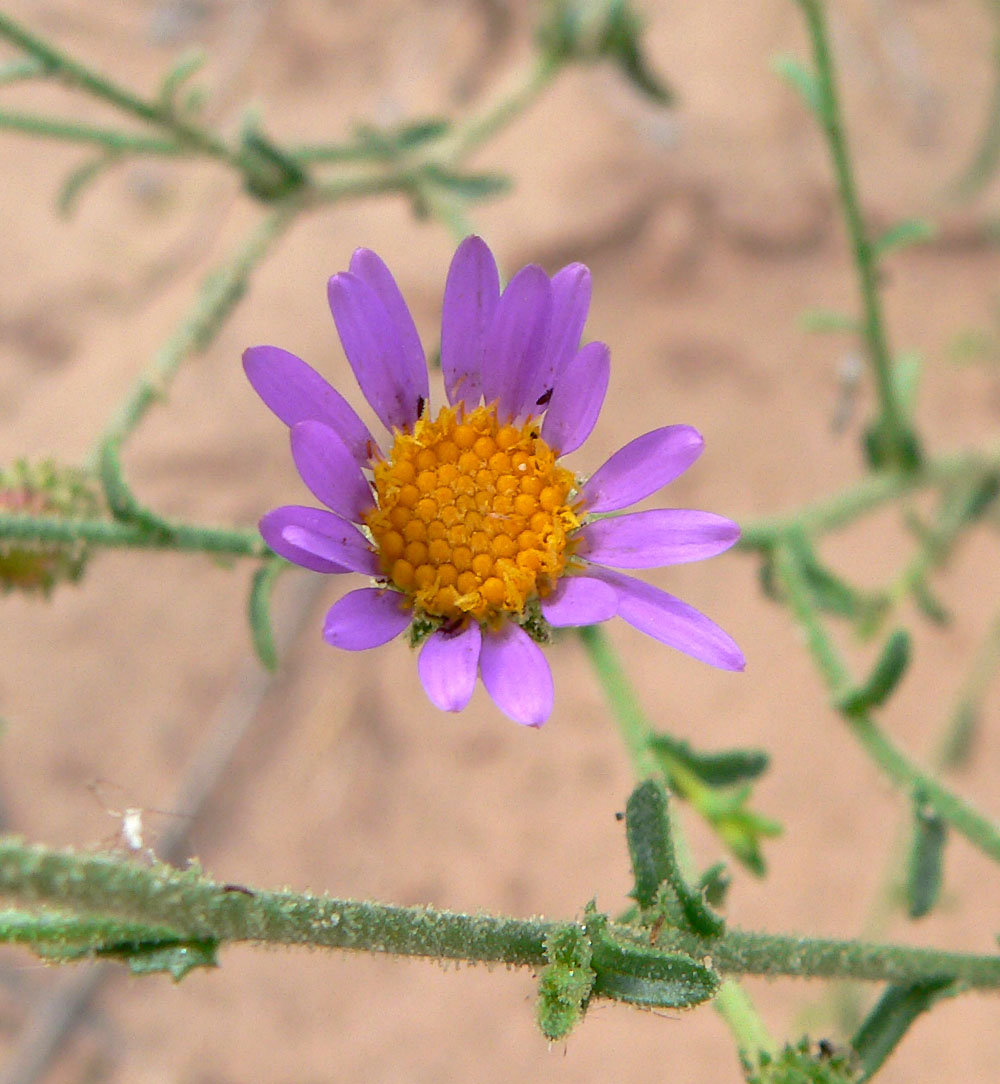

Conservation status
- Secure (NatureServe)

Scientific classification
- Kingdom: Plantae
- Clade: Tracheophytes
- Clade: Angiosperms
- Clade: Eudicots
- Clade: Asterids
- Order: Asterales
- Family: Asteraceae
- Genus: Dieteria
- Species: D. canescens

Binomial name
- Dieteria canescens (Pursh) A.Gray

Synonyms
- Synonymy: Aster biennis Nutt.; Aster canescens Pursh; Aster glossophyllus Piper; Aster leiodes S.F.Blake; Dieteria divaricata Nutt.; Dieteria pulverulenta Nutt.; Dieteria viscosa Nutt.; Machaeranthera angustifolia Rydb.; Machaeranthera divaricata (Nutt.) Greene; Machaeranthera glabella Greene ex Rydb.; Machaeranthera laetevirens Greene; Machaeranthera latifolia A.Nelson; Machaeranthera leptophylla Rydb.; Machaeranthera linearis Rydb. 1900, not Greene 1897; Machaeranthera montana Greene; Machaeranthera paniculata A.Nelson; Machaeranthera pinosa Elmer; Machaeranthera pulverulenta (Nutt.) Greene; Machaeranthera ramosa A.Nelson; Machaeranthera selbyi Rydb.; Machaeranthera spinulosa (Greene) Cory; Machaeranthera subalpina Greene; Machaeranthera superba A.Nelson; Machaeranthera viscosa (Nutt.) Greene; Machaeranthera angustifolia Wooton & Standl. 1913, not Rydb. 1910, syn of var. ambigua; Machaeranthera oxylepis Greene, syn of var. ambigua; Machaeranthera scoparia Greene, syn of var. ambigua; Machaeranthera cichoriacea, syn of var. aristata; Machaeranthera rigida Greene, syn of var. aristata; Aster linearis (Greene) Cory, syn of var. glabra; Machaeranthera linearis Greene, syn of var. glabra; Aster attenuatus (Howell) Frye & Rigg, syn of var. incana; Aster attenuatus (Howell) M.Peck, syn of var. incana; Dieteria incana (Lindl.) Torr. & A.Gray, syn of var. incana; Diplopappus incanus Lindl., syn of var. incana; Machaeranthera attenuata Howell, syn of var. incana; Machaeranthera incana (Lindl.) Greene, syn of var. leucanthemifolia; Aster leucanthemifolius Greene, syn of var. leucanthemifolia; Machaeranthera hiemalis A.Nelson, syn of var. leucanthemifolia; Machaeranthera leucanthemifolia (Greene) Greene, syn of var. leucanthemifolia; Dieteria sessiliflora Nutt., syn of var. sessiliflora; Machaeranthera magna A.Nelson, syn of var. sessiliflora; Machaeranthera sessiliflora (Nutt.) Greene, syn of var. sessiliflora; Aster eradiatus (A.Gray) Frye & Rigg, syn of var. shastensis; Aster inornatus Greene Synonym, syn of var. shastensis; Aster shastensis (A.Gray) A.Gray, syn of var. shastensis; Machaeranthera eradiata (A.Gray) Howell, syn of var. shastensis; Machaeranthera inops A.Nelson & J.F.Macbr., syn of var. shastensis; Machaeranthera inornata (Greene) Greene, syn of var. shastensis; Machaeranthera shastensis A.Gray, syn of var. shastensis

= Dieteria canescens =

Species of flowering plant

Dieteria canescens (formerly Machaeranthera canescens) is an annual plant or short lived perennial plant in the family Asteraceae, known by the common names hoary tansyaster and hoary-aster.

"Canescens" means "gray-hairy".

== Range and habitat ==
Dieteria canescens is native to western and central North America, from the Pacific Coast to the Western part of the Great Plains, from British Columbia south to California, Sonora, and Chihuahua, east to Saskatchewan, the Dakotas, and Oklahoma, with a few isolated populations in Iowa and Minnesota.

== Growth pattern ==
Dieteria canescens is a woolly-haired, glandular annual or perennial herb with one or more branching stems sometimes exceeding 100 cm (39 in) in height.

== Leaves and stems ==
The linear to oblong leaves may reach 10 centimetres (3.9 inches) long near the base of the stems, their edges usually serrated or toothed.

The stems are glandular with short hairs.

== Flowers and fruits ==
The inflorescence bears one or more flower heads lined with several layers of pointed, curling or curving phyllaries. The head has a center of many yellow disc florets and a fringe of blue or purple ray florets each 1 to 2 centimeters long. The fruit is an achene around 3 millimeters in length tipped with a pappus of long hairs.

A number of insects can often be found in the flowers.

== Uses ==
The Zuni people take an infusion the whole plant of subspecies canescens, variety canescens and rub it on the abdomen as an emetic.

Varieties

- Dieteria canescens var. ambigua (B.L.Turner) D.R.Morgan & R.L.Hartm. – Arizona, Colorado, New Mexico
- Dieteria canescens var. aristata (Eastw.) D.R.Morgan & R.L.Hartm. – Arizona, Colorado, New Mexico, Utah
- Dieteria canescens var. canescens – Alberta, British Columbia, Saskatchewan; Arizona, California, Colorado, Idaho, Montana, Nebraska, Nevada, North Dakota, Oregon, South Dakota, Utah, Wyoming
- Dieteria canescens var. glabra (A.Gray) D.R.Morgan & R.L.Hartm. – Arizona, Colorado, Kansas, New Mexico, Texas, Wyoming, Chihuahua
- Dieteria canescens var. incana (Lindl.) D.R.Morgan & R.L.Hartm. – Nebraska, South Dakota
- Dieteria canescens var. leucanthemifolia (Greene) D.R.Morgan & R.L.Hartm. – California, Nevada, Utah
- Dieteria canescens var. nebraskana (B.L.Turner) D.R.Morgan & R.L.Hartm. – Nebraska, South Dakota
- Dieteria canescens var. sessiliflora (Nutt.) D.R.Morgan & R.L.Hartm. – Idaho
- Dieteria canescens var. shastensis (A.Gray) D.R.Morgan & R.L.Hartm. – California, Nevada, Oregon
- Dieteria canescens var. ziegleri (Munz) D.R.Morgan & R.L.Hartm. – Santa Rosa Mountains in Riverside County in California
