= Harry Norton Patterson =

American botanist

- Born: February 15, 1853; Oquawka, Illinois
- Died: May 22, 1919 (aged 66); Burlington, Iowa
- Scientific career
- Fields: Botany
- Author abbrev. (botany): Patt.

Harry Norton Patterson (February 15, 1853 – May 22, 1919) was an American printer and botanist.

Patterson was born on February 15, 1853. His father was Edwin H. N. "Sniktau" Patterson, the namesake of Mount Sniktau. He started his career as an apprentice to his grandfather, the publisher of the Oquawka Spectator newspaper. At the age of 19, he published his first botanical paper, which was a catalog of plants collected around his hometown of Oquawka, Illinois. Merritt Lyndon Fernald remarked on the thoroughness of this text. He began to study the flora of Colorado sporadically between 1880 and 1895, with his early trips focused on the Gore Range. He issued the exsiccata series Colorado Flora.

In 1884, Patterson took control of the Spectator. He often collaborated with botanists such as Michael Schuck Bebb, Cyrus Pringle, Edward Lee Greene, William Marriott Canby, and Asa Gray, and exchanged printed floras with his contemporaries. He also published works by other botanists, including John Donnell Smith's catalog of Guatemalan plants. His wife Florence Beaty also collected botanical specimens.

== Legacy ==
Stylisma pickeringii var. pattersonii, known as Patterson's bindweed, is named for Patterson. Artemesia pattersonii, Astragalus pattersonii, Cryptantha pattersonii, and Machaeranthera pattersonii were named for Patterson by Asa Gray. Poa pattersonii was named for him by George Vasey.

His personal herbarium is now housed at the Field Museum of Natural History.

== Select publications ==
- Patterson, Harry Norton (1874). A List of Plants Collected in the Vicinity of Oquawka, Henderson County, Ills. Oquawka Spectator Print.
- Patterson, Harry Norton (1876). Catalogue of the Phaenogamous and Vascular Crytogamous Plants of Illinois: Native and Introduced. "Spectator" Print.
- Patterson, Harry Norton (1892). Patterson's Numbered Check-list of North American Plants North of Mexico. H.N. Patterson.
