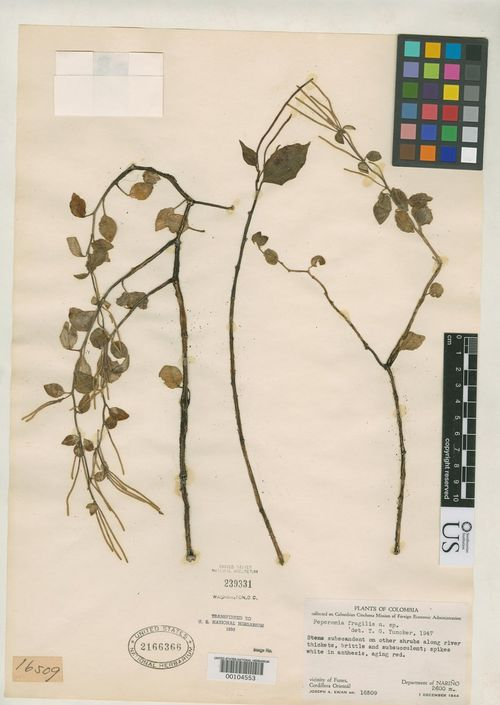

Scientific classification
- Kingdom: Plantae
- Clade: Tracheophytes
- Clade: Angiosperms
- Clade: Magnoliids
- Order: Piperales
- Family: Piperaceae
- Genus: Peperomia
- Species: P. fragilis

Binomial name
- Peperomia fragilis Yunck.

= Peperomia fragilis =

Species of flowering plant

Peperomia fragilis is a species of epiphyte in the genus Peperomia that is endemic in Colombia. It grows on wet tropical biomes. Its conservation status is Threatened.

== Description ==
The type specimen was collected in Nariño, Colombia.

Peperomia fragilis is a medium-sized, sprawling, somewhat succulent herb with stems that climb on shrubs, brittle in texture, covered with crisped hairs, with internodes 1–2 cm long above to 4 cm (1.6 in) or more below. The leaves are elliptic-obovate or occasionally somewhat round, measuring 6–14 mm wide by 10–20 or 25 mm long, with apex acute or rounded and base somewhat acute. They are crisp-pubescent above along the midrib, smooth beneath, fringed with fine hairs toward the apex, rather faintly palmately 3-nerved with the midrib obscurely branched upward, drying membranous and translucent, faintly yellow glandular-dotted beneath. The petiole is 5–10 mm long and crisp-pubescent. The terminal and axillary spikes, sometimes 2 or more on small axillary branches, are closely flowered, 1 mm thick by 3–4 cm long, white when in flower and red with age, on peduncles up to about 10 mm long that are nearly hairless. The bracts are round-peltate. The fruit is about 0.70 mm long, globose-ovoid with oblique apex and subapical stigma.

It resembles P. rotundata to some extent but differs in its less hairy stems and glabrous lower leaf surface.

== Taxonomy and naming ==
It was described in 1950 by Truman G. Yuncker in The Piperaceae of northern South America 2, from specimens collected by Joseph Andorfer Ewan. It got its name from description of the species.

== Distribution and habitat ==
It is endemic in Colombia. It grows on a epiphyte environment and is a herb. In Colombia, its elevation range is 2,600 m (8,500 ft). It grows on wet tropical biomes.

== Conservation ==
This species is assessed as Threatened, in a preliminary report.
