= Joseph Ewan =

American botanist

Joseph Andorfer Ewan
- Born: October 24, 1909; Philadelphia
- Died: December 5, 1999 (aged 90); Mandeville, Louisiana
- Awards: Guggenheim Fellowship (1953)
- Scientific career
- Fields: Botany; History of botany
- Author abbrev. (botany): Ewan

Joseph Andorfer Ewan (1909–1999) was an American botanist, naturalist, and historian of botany and natural history.

== Biography ==
Joseph Ewan grew up in Los Angeles and developed an early interest in the study of nature. At the age of eighteen, he published an ornithological report in The Condor. He matriculated at UCLA and transferred to the University of California, Berkeley in 1933, graduating there with a B.A. in 1934. After graduating he remained at Berkeley until 1937 as a research assistant to Willis Jepson. In 1935 Ewan married a fellow botanical student, Ada Nesta Dunn (1908–2000), in Reno, Nevada. She often collaborated with him on their publications. He was from 1937 to 1944 an instructor at the University of Colorado, from 1944 to 1945 a botanist with the Foreign Economic Administration, from 1945 to 1946 an assistant curator at the Smithsonian Institution, and from 1946 to 1947 an associate botanist at the USDA's Bureau of Plant Industry. At Tulane University he became in 1947 an assistant professor and was eventually promoted to associate professor, and then full professor. There he held the Ida Richard Professorship from 1972 to 1977, when he retired as professor emeritus.

Ewan was a member of London's Society for the Bibliography of Natural History and in 1977 received its Founder's Medal.

Joseph Ewan wrote extensively on the history of naturalists in America during the 17th, 18th, and 19th centuries. The number of his publications exceeds 400. Between 1941 and 1948, he wrote a series of essays entitled "Botanical explorers of Colorado", each of which appeared in Trail and Timberline, a magazine published by the Colorado Mountain Club. The essays, together with an annotated list of 798 naturalists, were published in 1950 as a book entitled Rocky Mountain Naturalists. The book included nine essays on the following naturalists: Edwin James, John Charles Fremont, Charles Christopher Parry, Edward Lee Greene, Thomas Conrad Porter, Harry Norton Patterson, Marcus Eugene Jones, Eugene Penard, and Theodore Dru Alison Cockerell. In the 2nd edition of the book published in 1981, the essays were dropped but the list of naturalists was expanded. Together Joseph and Nesta Ewan wrote John Banister and his natural history of Virginia (1970), a Biographical dictionary of Rocky Mountain naturalists (1981), and Benjamin Smith Barton: naturalist and physician in Jeffersonian America (published posthumously in 2007).

... there are his many contributions to The Dictionary of Scientific Biography where ones finds, among others, sketches of George Engelmann, Albert Spear Hitchcock, Elmer Drew Merrill, Frederick Pursh, and the irascible Constantine Samuel Rafinesque. His introductions to the Classica Botanica Americana series are classics themselves.

Joseph Ewan was one of the last survivors of a vanishing age in the history of science, the antiquarian era before "professionalisation", in which specialists on slime moulds wrote about the history of the study of slime moulds. Ewan's place as a historian is with Charles Singer, F.J. Cole and Clifford Dobell.

During their long marriage, Mr. and Mrs. Ewan collected about 4,500 books and huge numbers of "offprints, newspaper clippings, photocopies, correspondence, documents and manuscript notes." In 1986 the Missouri Botanical Garden purchased the collection and in 1997 published (and placed on-line) a Guide to the Ewan Papers which lists about 10,000 names.

Joseph Ewan died in 1999. His widow died in 2000. They were survived by three daughters, Kathleen, Dorothy, and Marjorie, and five grandchildren.

== Selected publications ==
- Ewan, Joseph (1936). "Bibliography of the botany of Arizona". The American Midland Naturalist. 17 (2): 430–454. doi:10.2307/2419970. JSTOR 2419970.
- Ewan, Joseph (1950). Rocky Mountain Naturalists. Colorado: University of Denver Press.
- Ewan, Joseph (1955). "San Francisco as a mecca for nineteenth century naturalists". In Babock, Ernest B.; Durham, J. Wyatt; Myers, George S. (eds.). A century of progress in the natural sciences, 1853–1953. San Francisco: California Academy of Sciences.
- Ewan, Joseph; Arnold, Chester Arthur (1969). A short history of botany in the United States. United Kingdom: Hafner Publishing Company.
- Ewan, Joseph; Ewan, Nesta Dunn (1981). Biographical dictionary of Rocky Mountain naturalists: a guide to the writings and collections of botanists, zoologists, geologists, artists and photographers, 1682–1932. Utrecht/Antwerpen: Bohn, Scheltema & Holkema. ISBN 90-313-0415-8.
- Ewan, Joseph; Ewan, Nesta Dunn (2007). Hollowell, Victoria C.; Duggan, Eileen P.; Crosby, Marshall R. (eds.). Benjamin Smith Barton: naturalist and physician in Jeffersonian America. Monographs in systematic botany from the Missouri Botanical Garden. Vol. 100. St. Louis: Missouri Botanical Garden Press. ISBN 978-1-930723-35-1.
