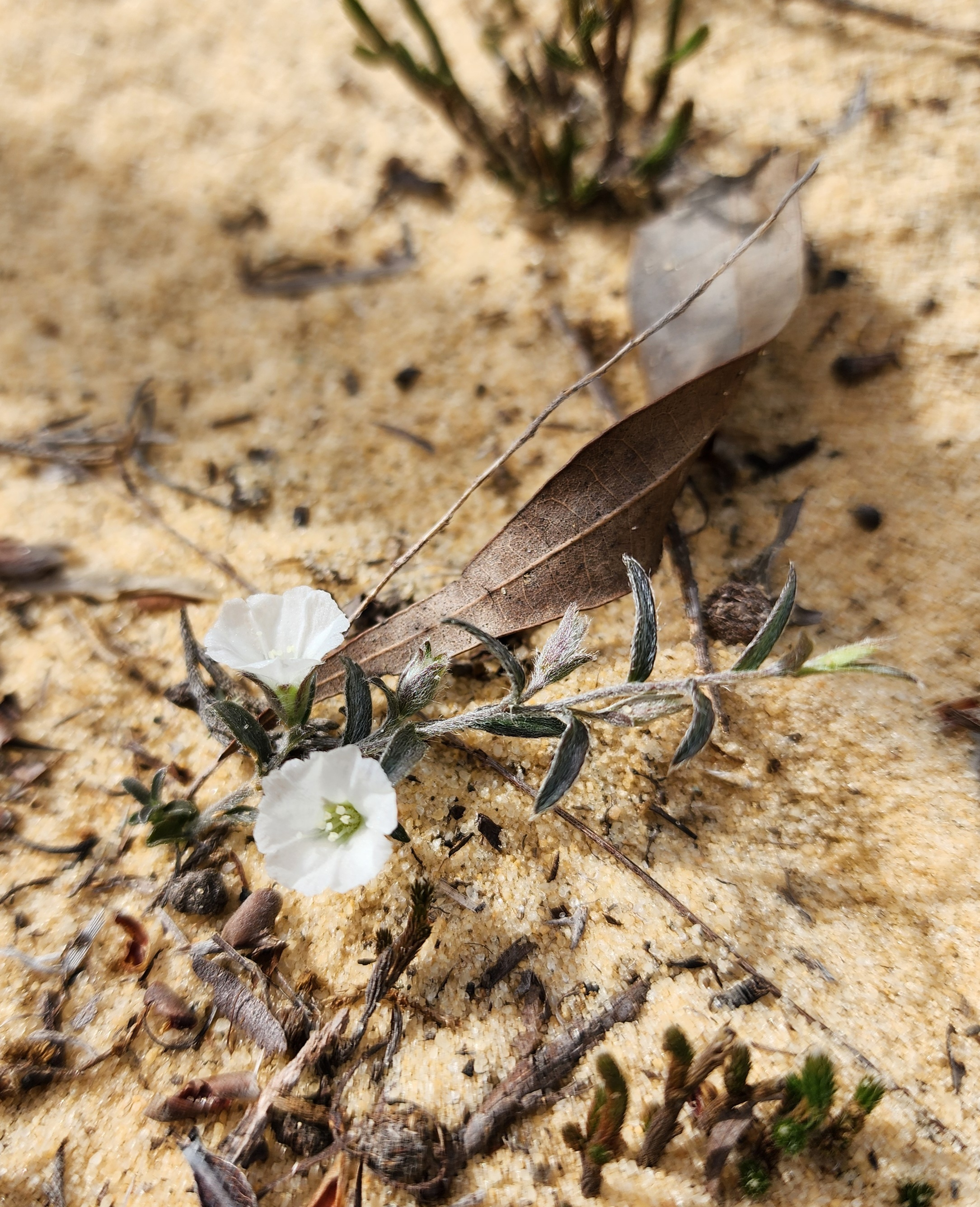

Conservation status
- Vulnerable (NatureServe)

Scientific classification
- Kingdom: Plantae
- Clade: Tracheophytes
- Clade: Angiosperms
- Clade: Eudicots
- Clade: Asterids
- Order: Solanales
- Family: Convolvulaceae
- Genus: Stylisma
- Species: S. abdita

Binomial name
- Stylisma abdita Myint

= Stylisma abdita =

Species of flowering plant

Stylisma abdita, commonly called showy dawnflower, is a threatened flowering plant in the Convolvulaceae family endemic to Florida.

== Description ==
A small perennial, it has white funnel-shaped flowers, trailing stems, hairy alternate leaves, and capsule fruit.

== Conservation ==
The species occurs in scrub habitat which is under threat from habitat loss and fragmentation due to development for real estate and agriculture. Historic and current fire suppression is also a threat, as it requires open canopy with full sun exposure.

It is known from an estimated 60 to 70 sites, some of them protected including Ocala National Forest, Lake Wales Ridge State Forest, Archbold Biological Station, Withlacoochee State Forest, Chassahowitzka Wildlife Management Area, among others.

== Gallery ==
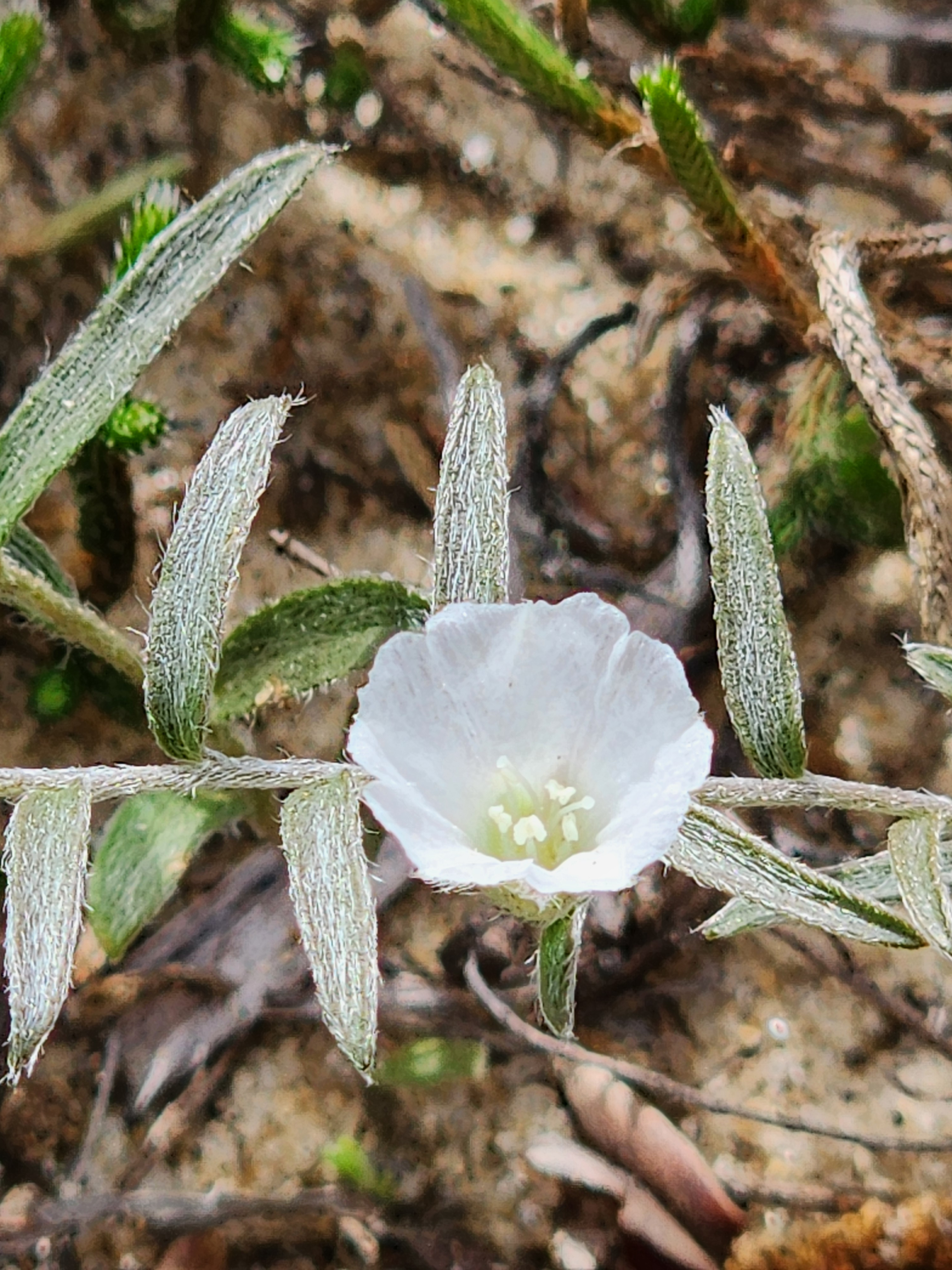

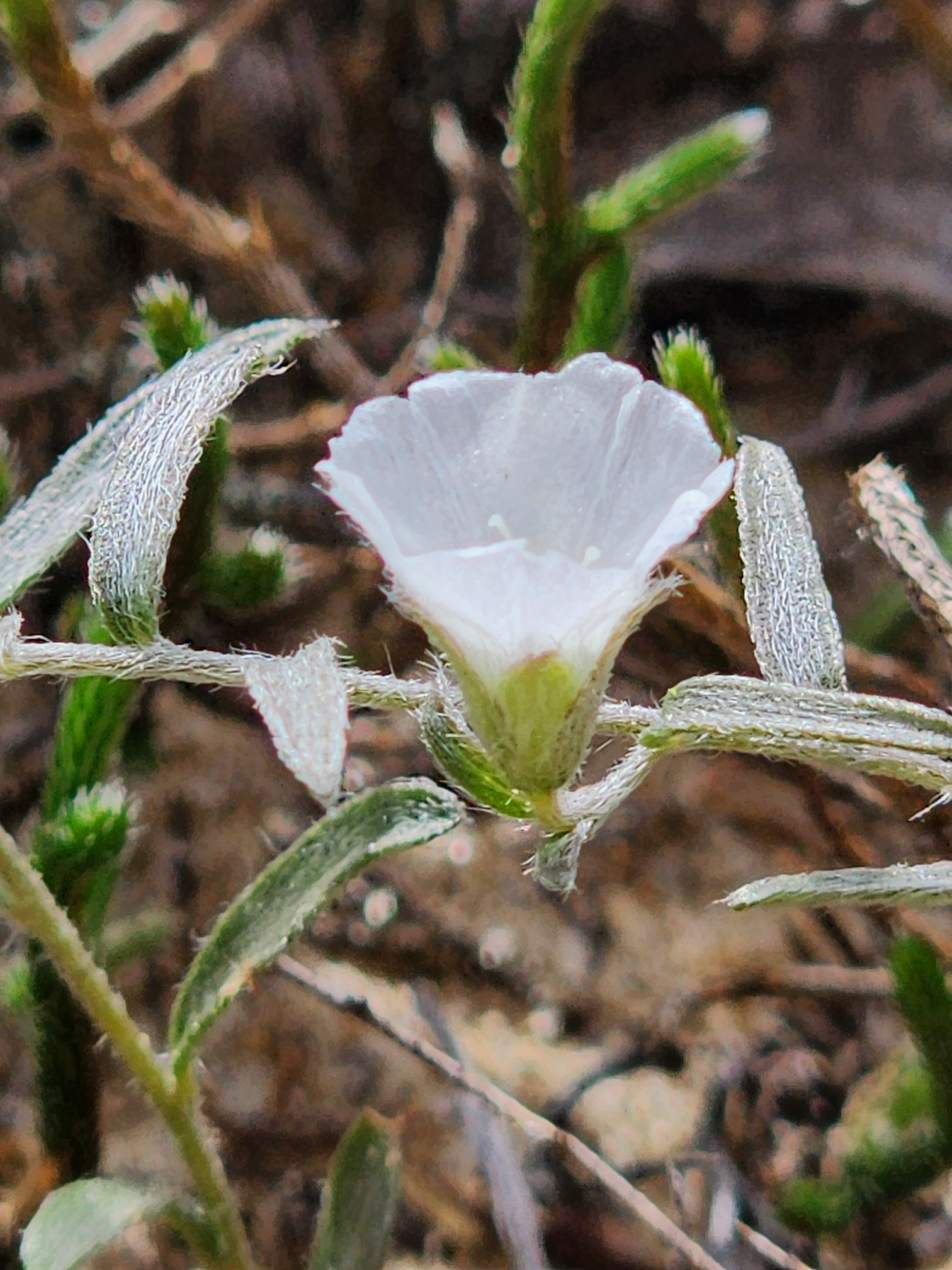

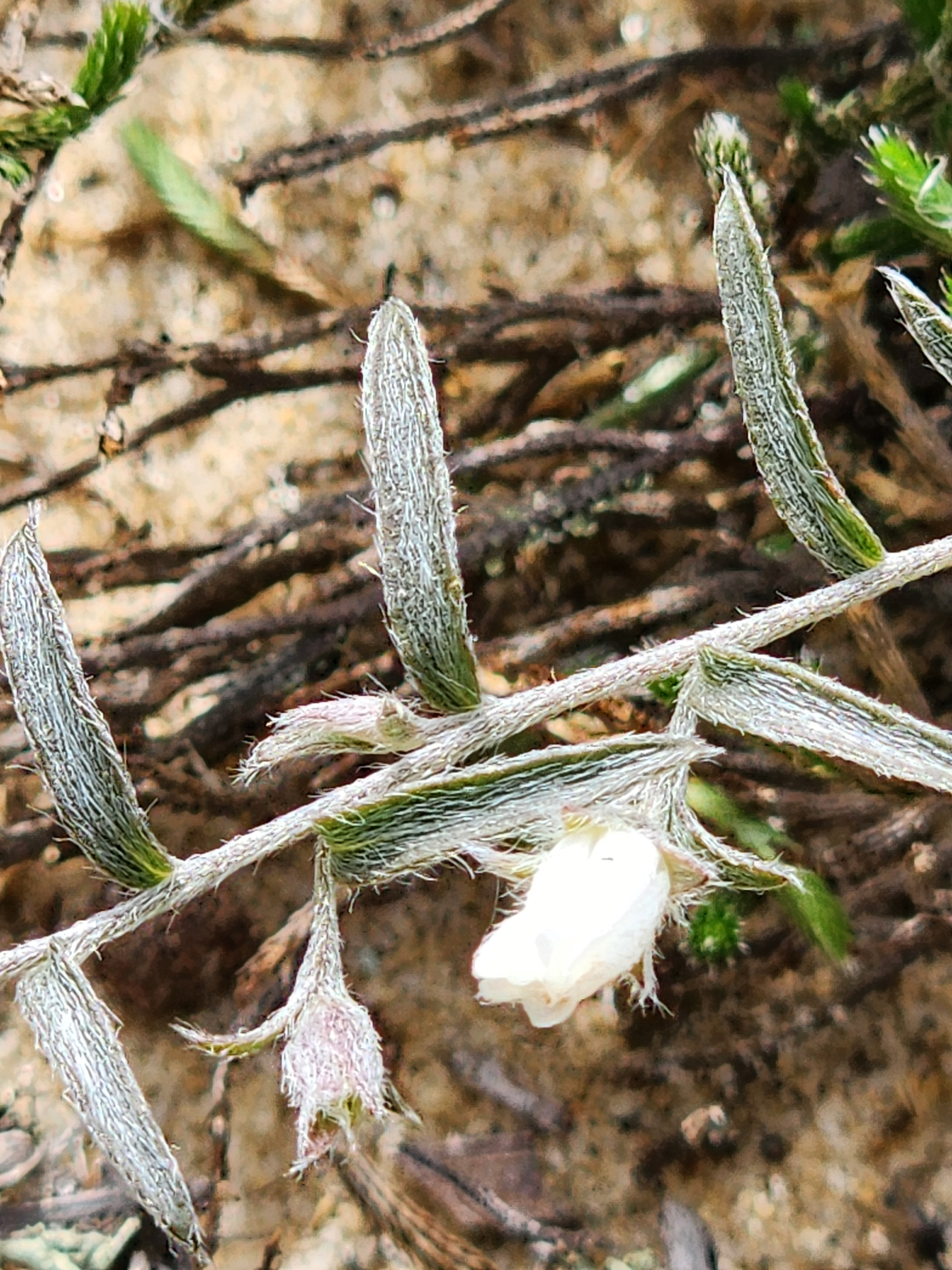

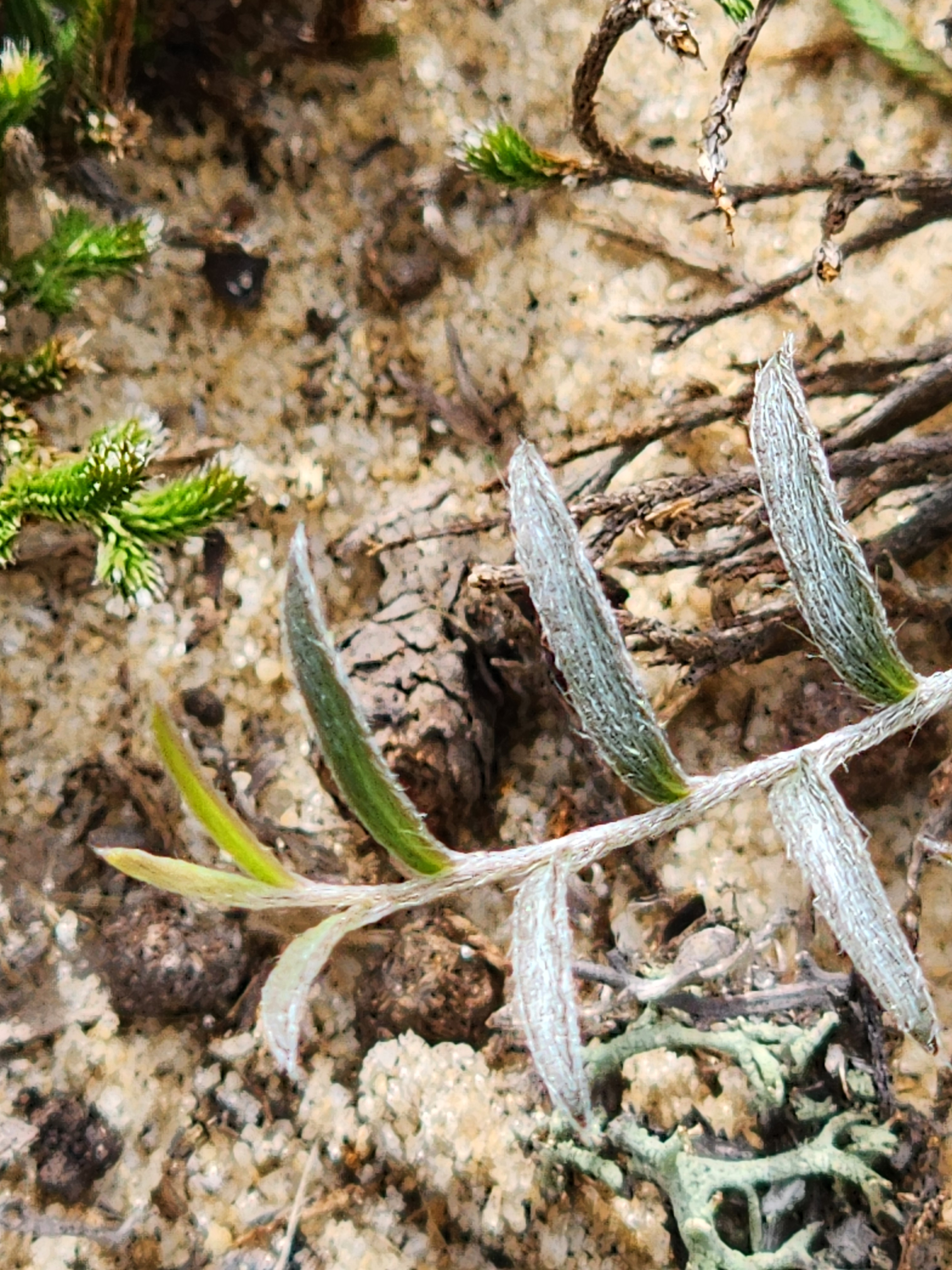
