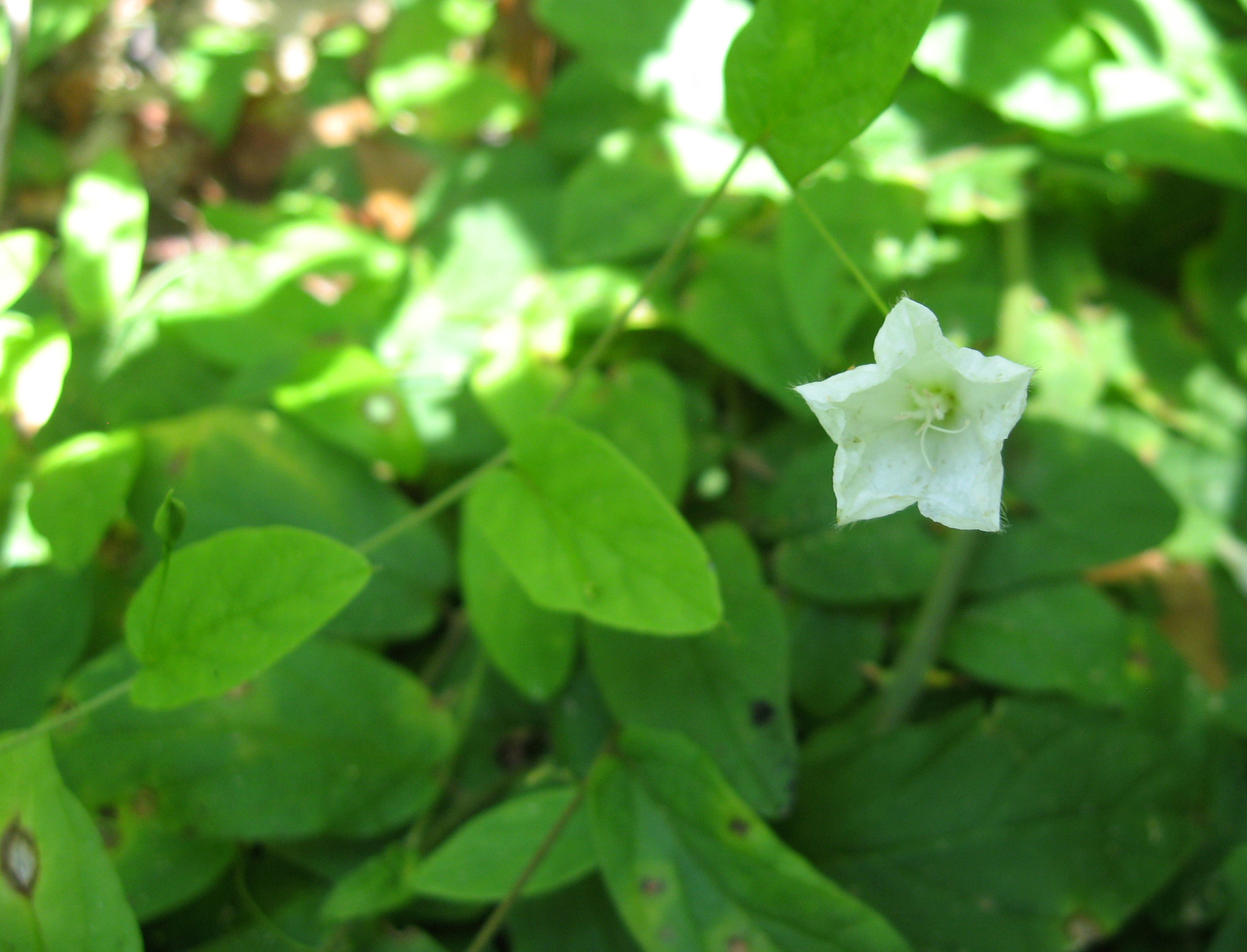
- Stylisma humistrata

Scientific classification
- Kingdom: Plantae
- Clade: Tracheophytes
- Clade: Angiosperms
- Clade: Eudicots
- Clade: Asterids
- Order: Solanales
- Family: Convolvulaceae
- Tribe: Cresseae
- Genus: Stylisma; Raf.

Species
- See text

= Stylisma =

Genus of flowering plants

Stylisma is a genus of flowering plants in the morning glory family, commonly known as dawnflowers. This genus is native to the eastern United States.

This genus consists of low vining or trailing herbs. They are found primarily in the Southeastern Coastal Plain in sandy habitats. However one species, Stylisma pickeringii, extends into the Midwest.

== Species ==
The following species are recognised in the genus Stylisma:

- Stylisma abdita Myint
- Stylisma aquatica (Walter) Raf.
- Stylisma humistrata (Walter) Chapm.
- Stylisma patens (Desr.) Myint
- Stylisma pickeringii (Torr. ex M.A.Curtis) A.Gray
- Stylisma villosa (Nash) House
