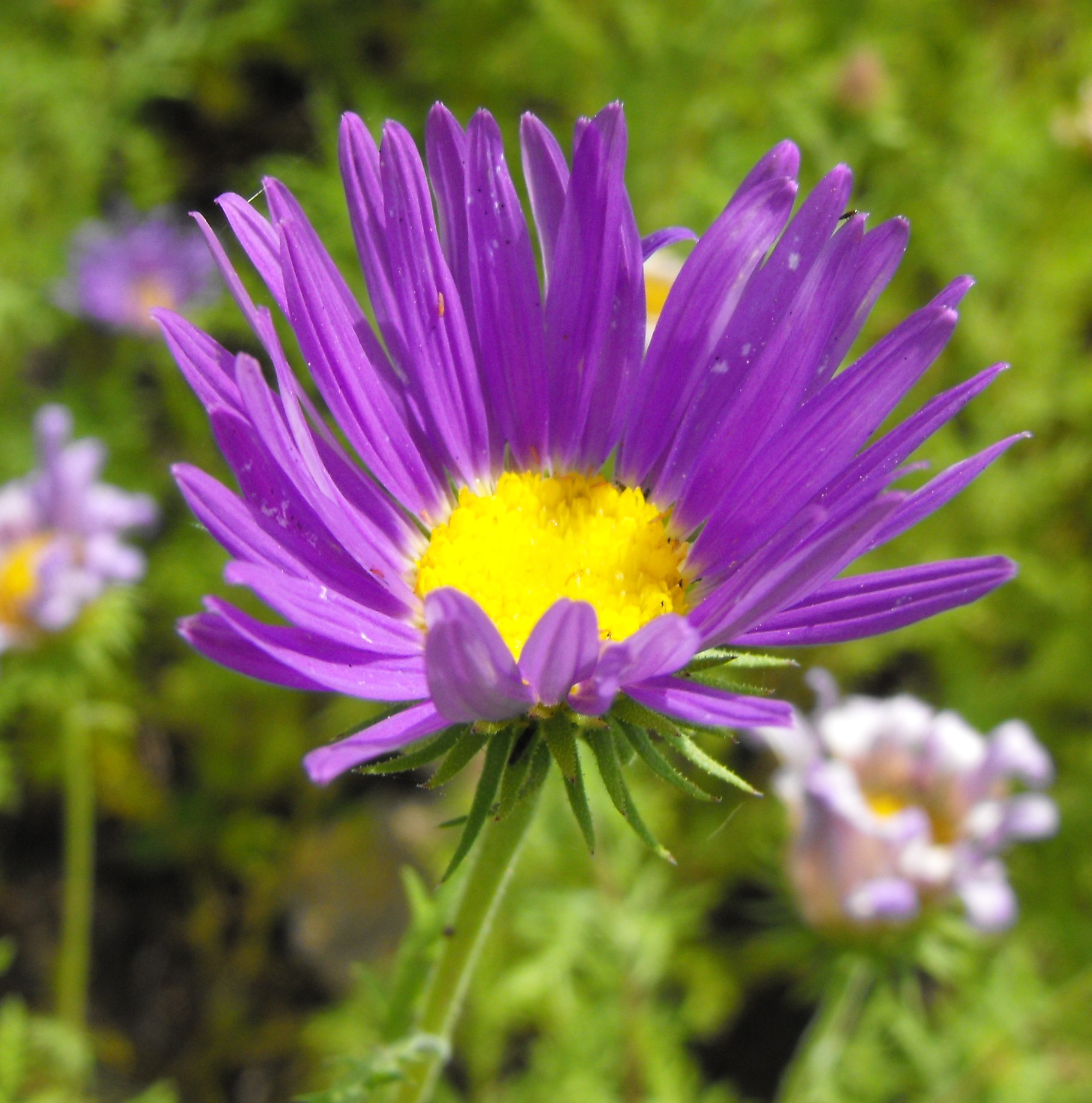

Conservation status
- Secure (NatureServe)

Scientific classification
- Kingdom: Plantae
- Clade: Tracheophytes
- Clade: Angiosperms
- Clade: Eudicots
- Clade: Asterids
- Order: Asterales
- Family: Asteraceae
- Genus: Machaeranthera
- Species: M. tanacetifolia

Binomial name
- Machaeranthera tanacetifolia (Kunth) Nees

Synonyms
- Machaeranthera coronopifolia Machaeranthera parthenium

= Machaeranthera tanacetifolia =

Species of flowering plant

Machaeranthera tanacetifolia is a species of flowering plant in the family Asteraceae known by the common names tansyleaf tansyaster and Tahoka daisy.

== Description ==
M. tanacetifolia is an annual or biennial herb growing one or more branching stems up to about 10–40 centimetres (4–15 1/2 inches) in height. The multilobed leaves are up to 5–12.5 cm (2–5 in) long. Between May and September, an inflorescence bears one or more flower heads lined with spreading or curling, pointed phyllaries. The head has a center of many yellow disc florets and a fringe of many lavender to purple ray florets each 1 to 2 cm (1/3 to 2/3 in) long. The fruit is a flat achene about 1 cm long including the pappus.

It is similar to M. parviflora, the flower heads of which are smaller.

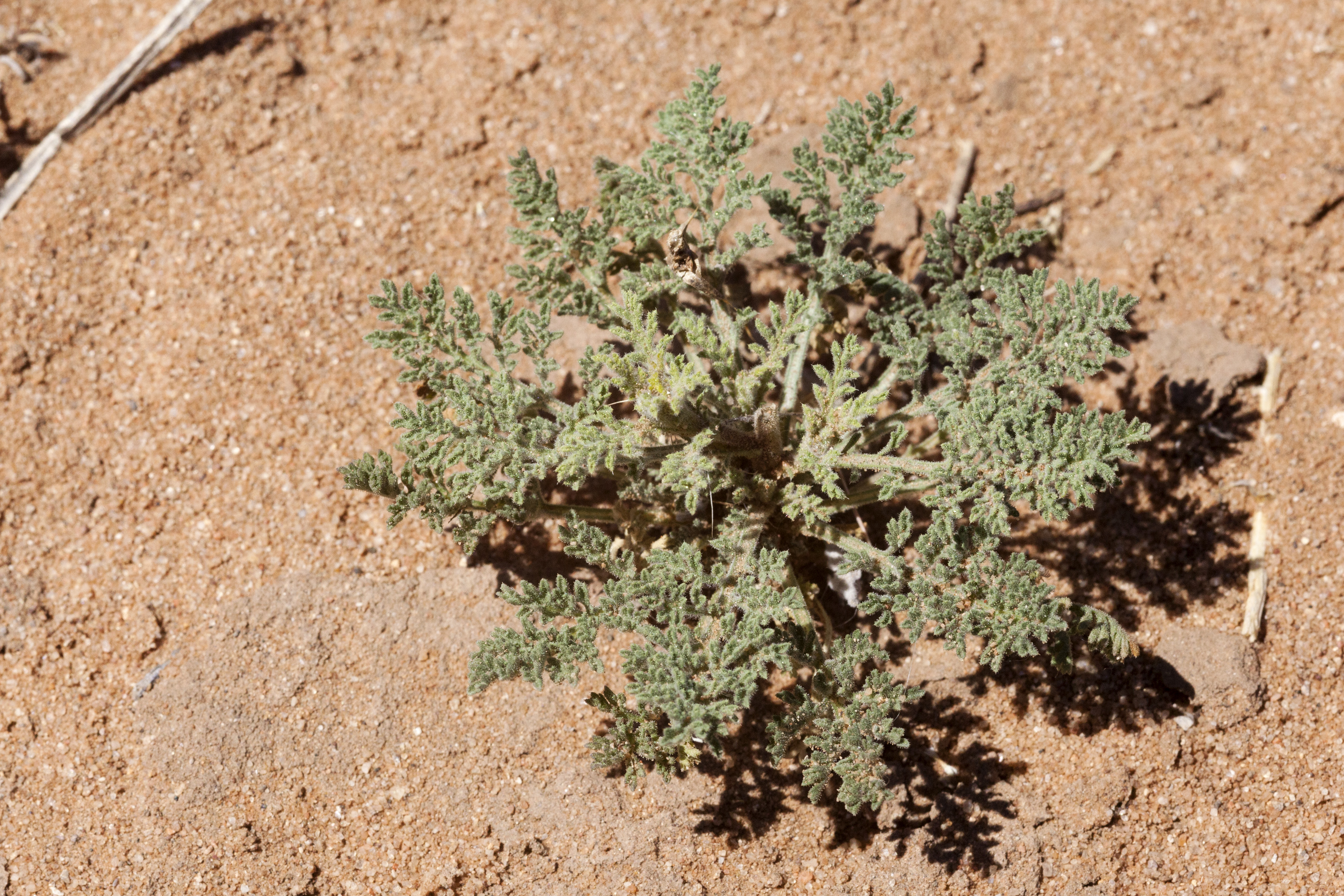
Plant before flowering

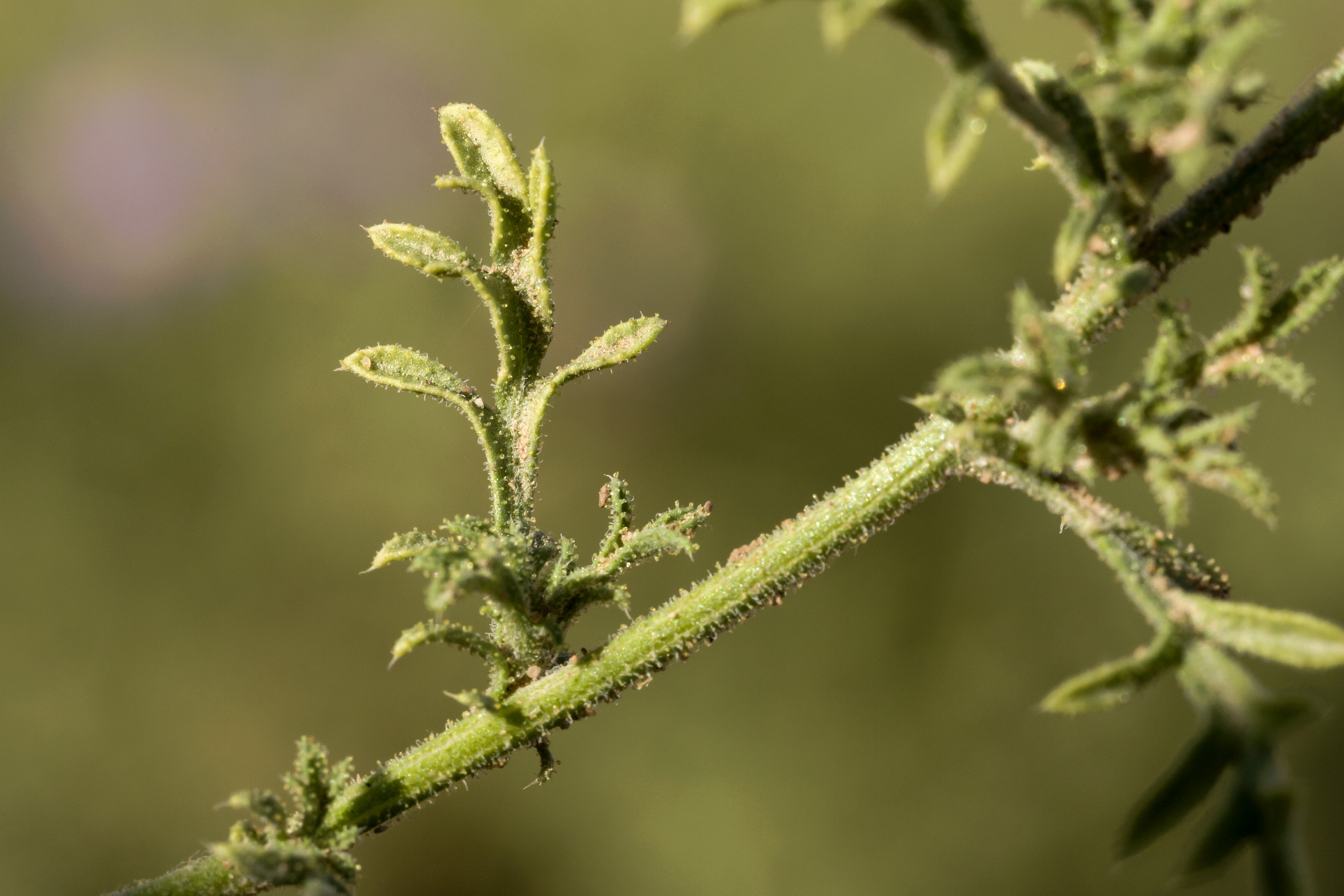
Close-up of foliage

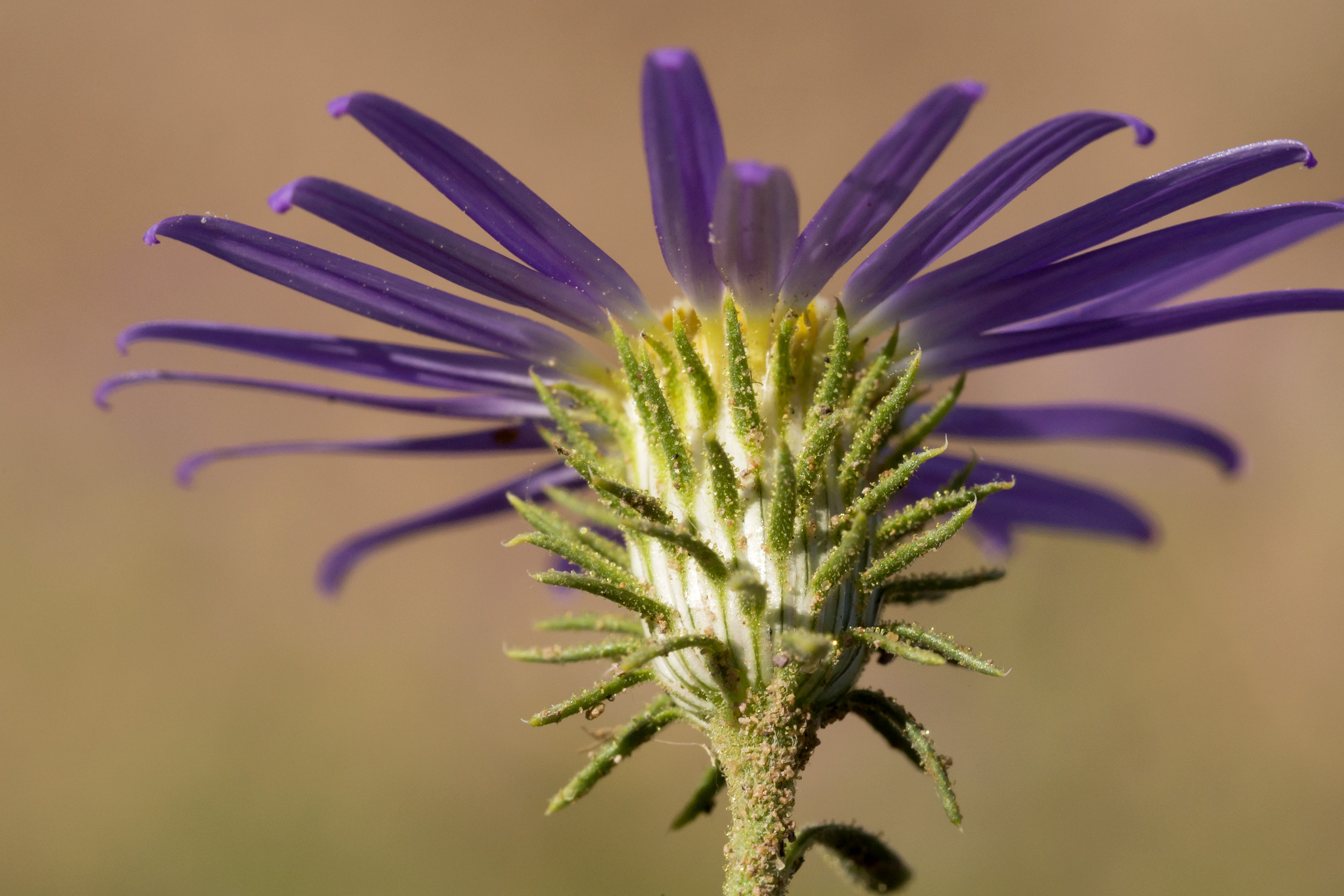
Underside of flower

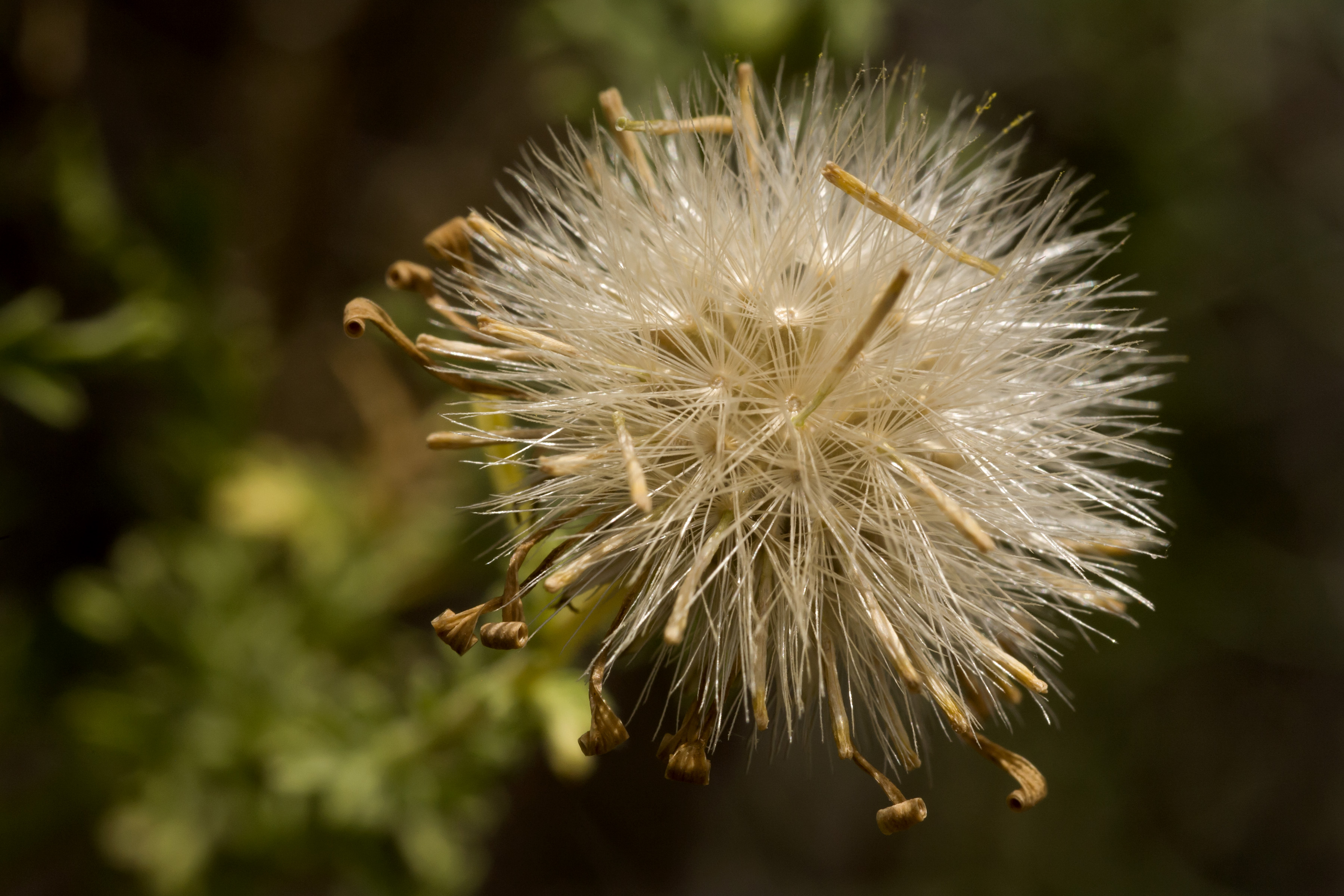
Flower gone to seed

== Distribution and habitat ==
It is native to Alberta, the southwestern and central United States, and northern Mexico. It grows in several types of habitat, including sandy open plains and deserts.

== Uses ==
The Zuni people use an infusion of the flowers taken with other flowers for unspecified illnesses.
