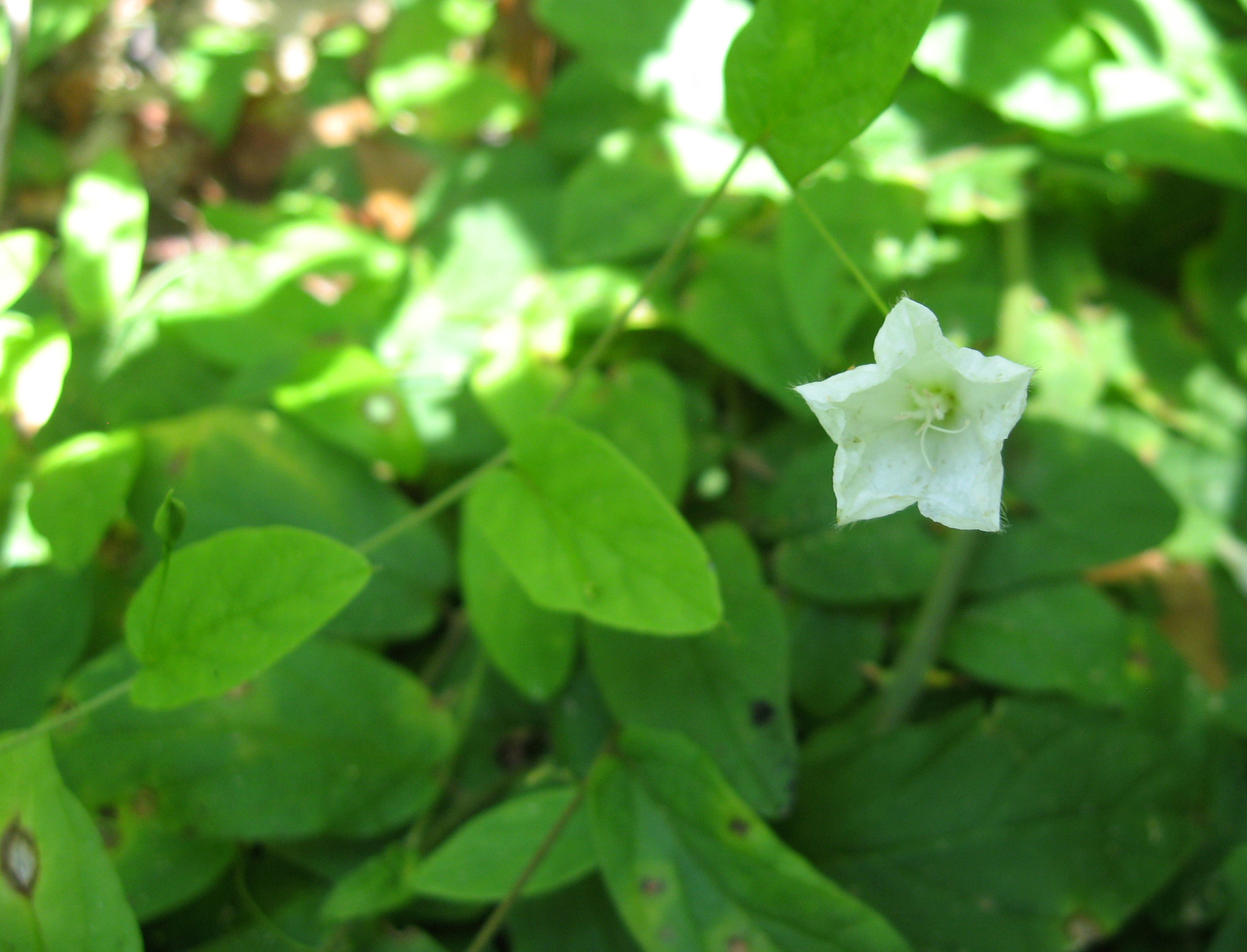

Scientific classification
- Kingdom: Plantae
- Clade: Tracheophytes
- Clade: Angiosperms
- Clade: Eudicots
- Clade: Asterids
- Order: Solanales
- Family: Convolvulaceae
- Genus: Stylisma
- Species: S. humistrata

Binomial name
- Stylisma humistrata (Walter) Chapm.

= Stylisma humistrata =

Species of flowering plant

Stylisma humistrata, also referred to as southern dawnflower, is a species of perennial forb found in North America.

== Description ==
S. humistra is a member of the morning glory family (Convolvulaceae) that may reach a length of 0.5 to 2 meters (approximately 1.64 to 6.56 feet). Due to the nature of its growth patterns, older individuals often form clumps or mats.

The leaves are oblong-elliptic to oblong-lanceolate, ranging in length from 2.5 to 8 centimeters and in width from 1.2 to 3 centimeters. They are subcordate and range from sparsely pubescent to pilose, with stellate or simple trichomes.

Inflorescence occurs from June through September. The corolla is white in color, ranging from 1.5 to 20 millimeters in length.

== Distribution and habitat ==
Within the United States S. humistra is primarily found within the southeastern region, its range stretching from Virginia south to Florida and westward to Texas.

It has been observed in habitats such as in sandy barrens, dry pinelands and hammocks, and along coastal dunes. This species does not require light for germination.
