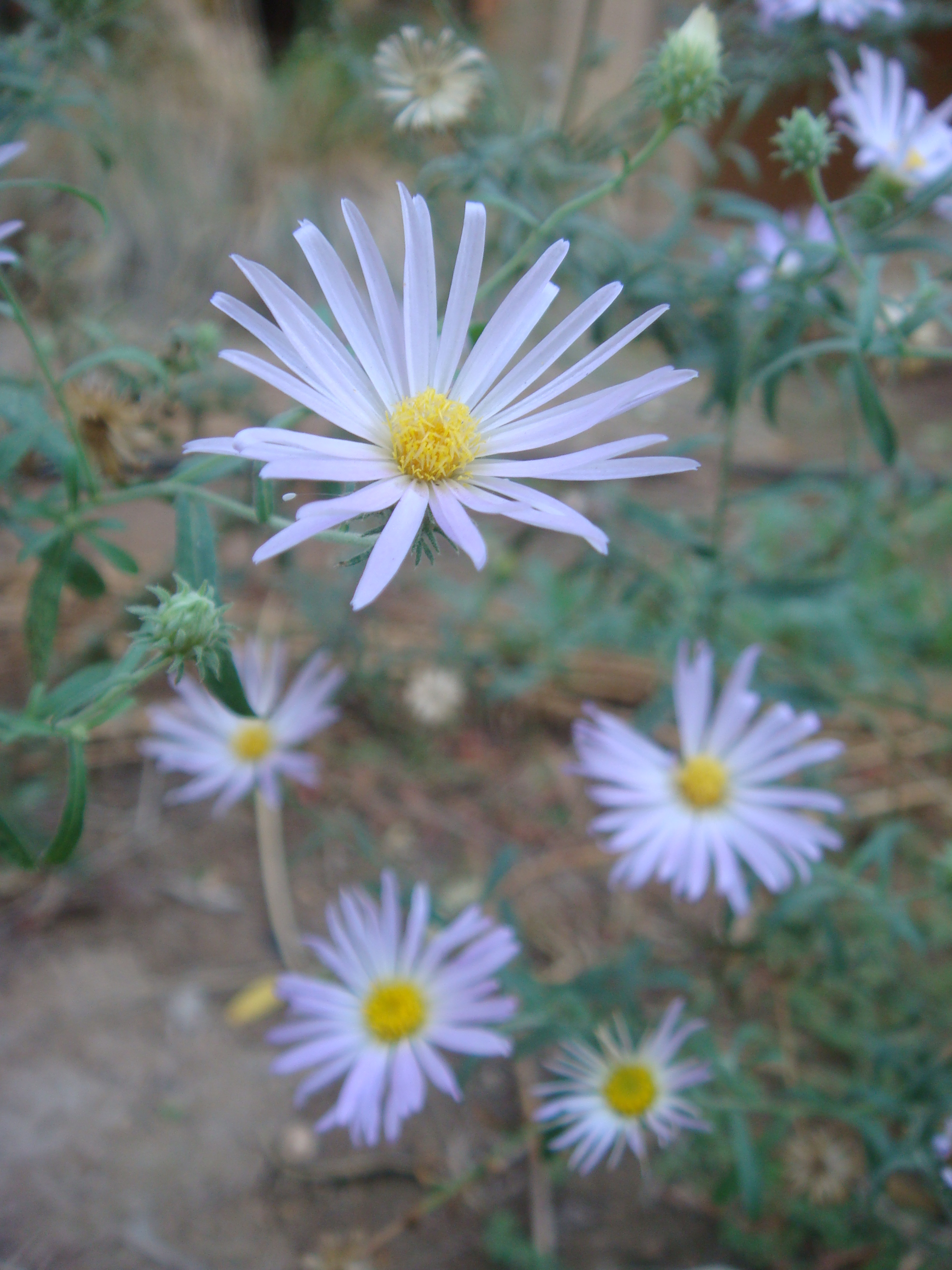

Scientific classification
- Kingdom: Plantae
- Clade: Embryophytes
- Clade: Tracheophytes
- Clade: Spermatophytes
- Clade: Angiosperms
- Clade: Eudicots
- Clade: Asterids
- Order: Asterales
- Family: Asteraceae
- Genus: Dieteria
- Species: D. asteroides

Binomial name
- Dieteria asteroides Torr.

Synonyms
- Synonymy: Aster amplifolius (Wooton & Standl.) Kittell; Dieteria asteroides Torr.; Machaeranthera amplifolia Wooton & Standl.; Machaeranthera asteroides (Torr.) Greene; Machaeranthera pruinosa A.Gray; Machaeranthera simplex Wooton & Standl.; Machaeranthera verna A.Nelson; Machaeranthera lagunensis D.D.Keck, syn of var. lagunensis

= Dieteria asteroides =

Species of flowering plant

Dieteria asteroides, the fall tansyaster, is a North American species of plants in the sunflower family. It is native to the southwestern United States (California, Arizona, Nevada, New Mexico, Colorado, Utah) and northern Mexico (Chihuahua, Sonora, Baja California).

Dieteria asteroides is a biennial or perennial herb with a woody taproot. It often grows in a clump of several stems. Ray florets in the flower heads are white or purple, and female. Disc florets are yellow and bisexual.

Varieties

- Dieteria asteroides var. asteroides - California, Arizona, Nevada, New Mexico, Chihuahua, Sonora
- Dieteria asteroides var. glandulosa (B.L.Turner) D.R.Morgan & R.L.Hartm. - Arizona, Nevada, New Mexico, Utah
- Dieteria asteroides var. lagunensis (D.D.Keck) D.R.Morgan & R.L.Hartm. Baja California; Laguna Mountains in San Diego County in California
