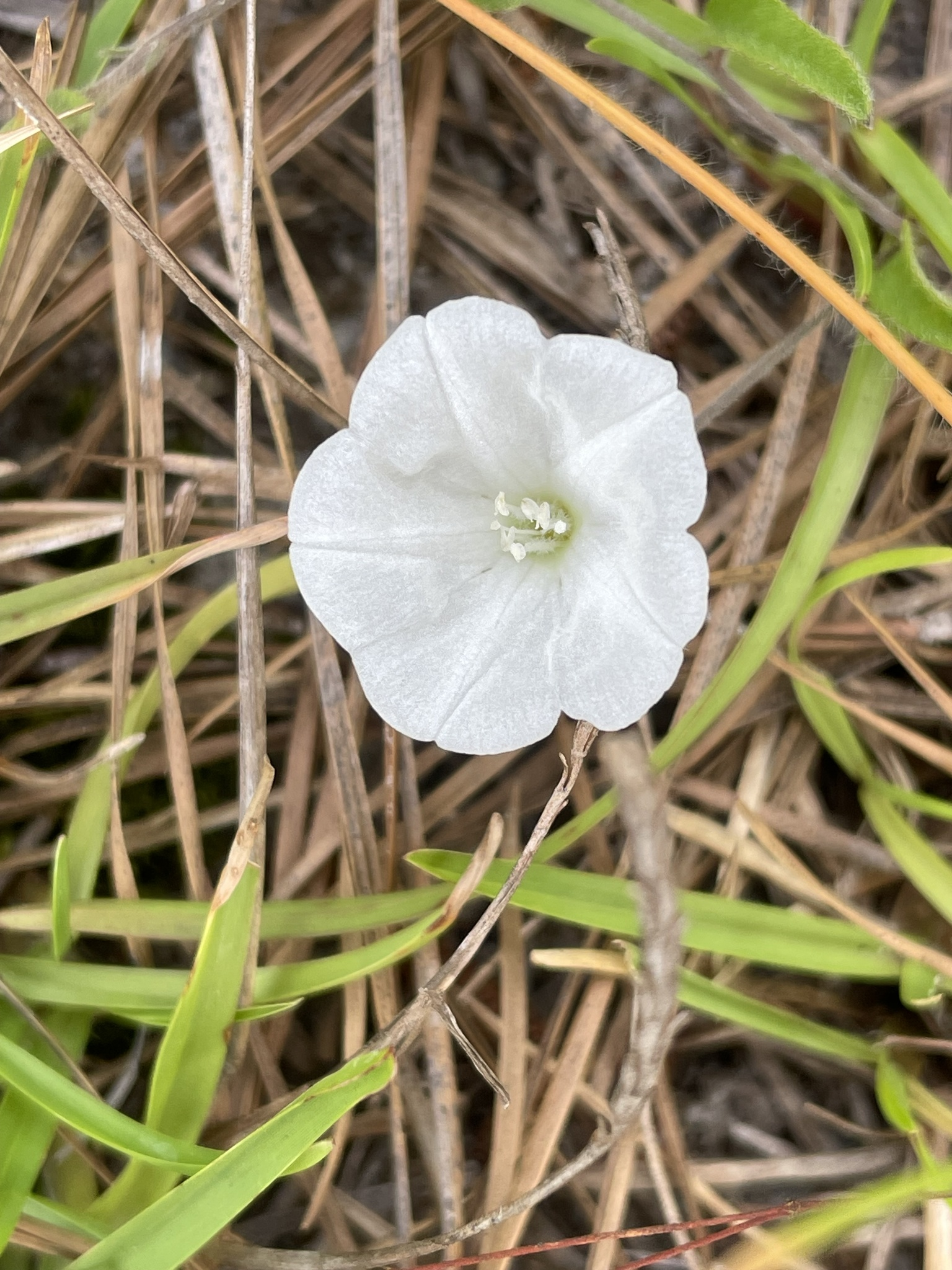
- Flower

Scientific classification
- Kingdom: Plantae
- Clade: Embryophytes
- Clade: Tracheophytes
- Clade: Spermatophytes
- Clade: Angiosperms
- Clade: Eudicots
- Clade: Asterids
- Order: Solanales
- Family: Convolvulaceae
- Genus: Stylisma
- Species: S. patens

Binomial name
- Stylisma patens (Desr.) Myint

= Stylisma patens =

Species of flowering plant

Stylisma patens, commonly referred to as coastal dawnflower or common dawnflower, is a member of the Convolvulaceae family found in North America. There are two known varieties: Stylisma patens var. patens and Stylisma patens var. angustifolia (Nash) Shinners.

== Description ==
Stylisma patens is a perennial prostrate vine, with stems that may reach up to 6 ft (1.8 m) in length. Stems may be either hairy or glabrous. The leaf blades are elliptic to lanceolate in shape. The two varieties have differing leaf dimensions; S. patens var. patens possesses blades 3 to 4 cm (1.2 to 1.6 in) long and 6 to 8 mm (0.24 to 0.31 in) wide, while S. patens var. angustifolia possesses blades 2 to 3 cm (0.8 to 1.2 in) long and 2 to 3 mm (0.08 to 0.12 in) wide.

Inflorescence is 2 to 5 flowered with scale-like bracteoles. The sepals are ovate-lanceolate in shape, approximately 6 to 9 mm (0.24 to 0.35 in) long and 3 to 5 mm (0.12 to 0.20 in) wide. The corolla is white. Blooms occur from springtime into the fall.

== Distribution and habitat ==
Within North America, S. patens can be found in the southeast region of the United States. Its native range encompasses the states of North Carolina, South Carolina, Georgia, Florida, Alabama, Mississippi, and Louisiana.

S. patens occurs in relatively dry, sandy habitats such as longleaf pine sandhills, and the xeric and subxeric sandhill communities of north Florida.

== Ecology ==
Stylisma patens is insect pollinated and is recorded to have been visited in northern Florida by Augochlorella aurata, Augochloropsis metallica, Augochloropsis sumptuosa, Ceratina, Lasioglossum apopkense, Lasioglossum imitatum, Lasioglossum reticulatum, and Melissodes tepaneca.
