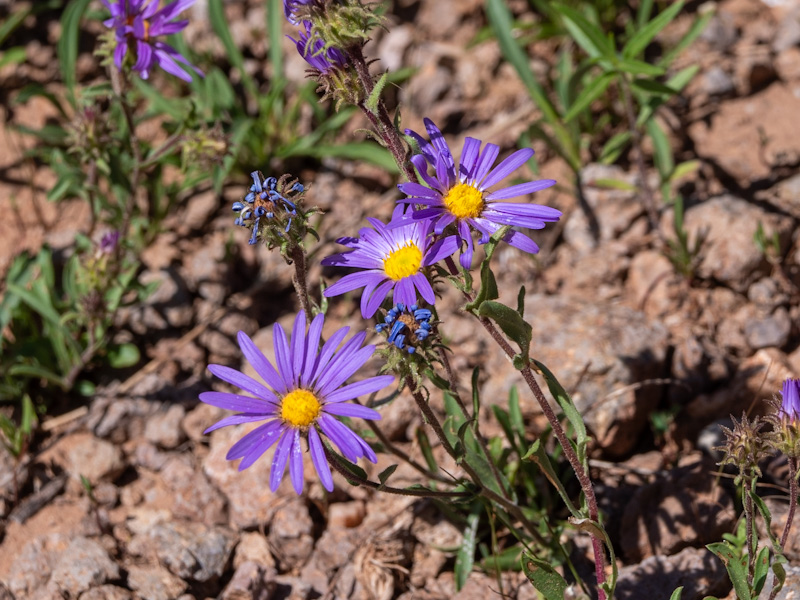
- Dieteria bigelovii var. commixta in Cedar Breaks Utah

Conservation status
- Apparently Secure (NatureServe)

Scientific classification
- Kingdom: Plantae
- Clade: Tracheophytes
- Clade: Angiosperms
- Clade: Eudicots
- Clade: Asterids
- Order: Asterales
- Family: Asteraceae
- Genus: Dieteria
- Species: D. bigelovii

Binomial name
- Dieteria bigelovii (A.Gray) D.R.Morgan & R.L.Hartm.

Synonyms
- Synonymy: Aster aquifolius (Greene ex Wooton & Standl.) S.F.Blake; Aster bigelovii A.Gray; Aster pattersonii A.Gray; Aster rubrotinctus S.F.Blake; Aster townshendii Hook.f.; Machaeranthera aquifolia Greene ex Wooton & Standl.; Machaeranthera aquifolia Greene; Machaeranthera aspera Greene; Machaeranthera bigelovii (A.Gray) Greene; Machaeranthera centaureoides Greene ex Wooton & Standl.; Machaeranthera pattersonii (A.Gray) Greene; Machaeranthera rubricaulis Rydb.; Machaeranthera spectabilis Greene; Machaeranthera varians Greene; Machaeranthera viscosula Rydb.; Machaeranthera commixta Greened, syn of var. commixta; Aster adenolepis S.F.Blake, syn of var. mucronata; Machaeranthera mucronata Greene, syn of var. mucronata

= Dieteria bigelovii =

Species of flowering plant

Dieteria bigelovii, also known as Bigelow's tansyaster or sticky aster, is a North American species of plants in the family Asteraceae.

== Description ==
D. bigelovii is a biennial or perennial herb growing to 30–90 centimetres (12–35 inches) in height. The leaves are 5–10 cm (2–4 in) long with sharp teeth. Between August and October, the plant produces several flower heads about 4 cm (1 1/2 in) wide. The blue or purple ray florets are female, while the yellow disc florets are bisexual. The ray florets close upwards in shade. The fruit is seedlike, with bristles at the tip.

True asters are similar, but usually lack spiny or divided leaves.

== Taxonomy ==
Varieties

- Dieteria bigelovii var. bigelovii - Colorado, New Mexico, Wyoming
- Dieteria bigelovii var. commixta (Greene) D.R.Morgan & R.L.Hartm. - Wasatch Mountains in Utah
- Dieteria bigelovii var. mucronata (Greene) D.R.Morgan & R.L.Hartm. - Kaibab Plateau in northern Arizona

== Distribution and habitat ==
The species is native to the southwestern United States (Arizona, New Mexico, Utah, Colorado, and Albany County in Wyoming). It can be found in open areas of coniferous forests.

Dieteria bigelovii was evaluated by NatureServe as G4, "apparently secure", in 1993. This means that at a global level it has fairly low risk of extinction or collapse due to an extensive range and/or many populations or occurrences, but with possible cause for some concern as a result of local recent declines, threats, or other factors. It was additionally rated critically imperiled (S1) in Nevada, imperiled (S2) in Wyoming, and vulnerable (S3) in Arizona.
