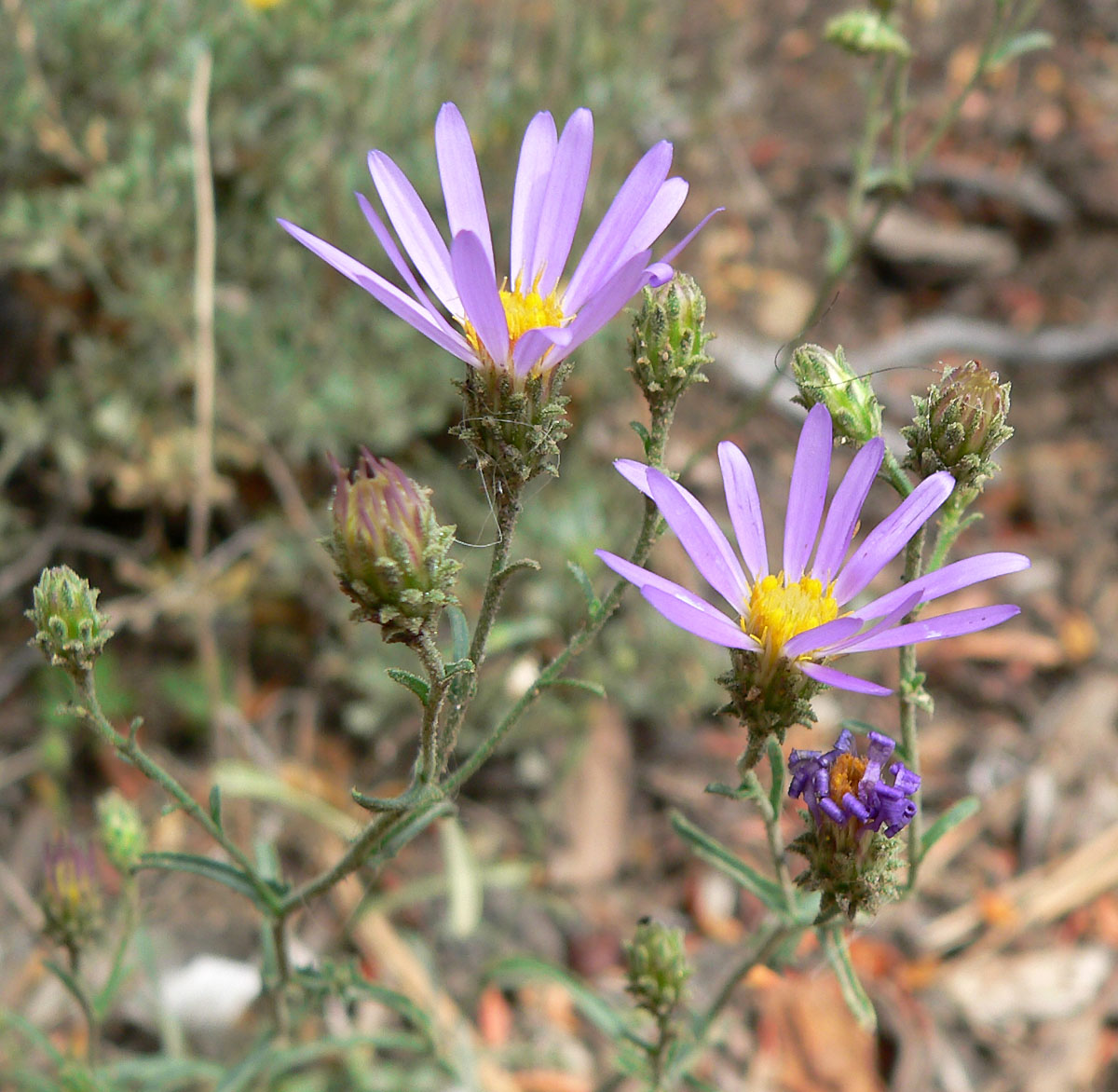
- Dieteria canescens var. canescens

Scientific classification
- Kingdom: Plantae
- Clade: Tracheophytes
- Clade: Angiosperms
- Clade: Eudicots
- Clade: Asterids
- Order: Asterales
- Family: Asteraceae
- Subfamily: Asteroideae
- Tribe: Astereae
- Subtribe: Machaerantherinae
- Genus: Dieteria; Nutt.

Synonyms
- Machaeranthera series Variabiles Cronquist & D.D.Keck; Machaeranthera subg. Dieteria (Nutt.) Greene; Aster subg. Hesperastrum (A.Gray) A.Gray

= Dieteria =

Genus of flowering plants

Dieteria is a North American genus of flowering plants in the family Asteraceae.

The genus Dieteria is closely related to Machaeranthera but distinguished by having entire to toothed leaves, whereas Machaeranthera has once or twice pinnate leaves.

Species

- Dieteria asteroides Torr. - Chihuahua, Durango, California, Nevada, Arizona, New Mexico, Colorado
- Dieteria bigelovii (A.Gray) D.R.Morgan & R.L.Hartm. - Arizona, New Mexico, Colorado, Utah, Wyoming
- Dieteria canescens (Pursh) Nutt. - most of western United States and western Canada; Chihuahua
- Dieteria shastensis (A.Gray) D.W.Taylor - California, Nevada, Oregon
