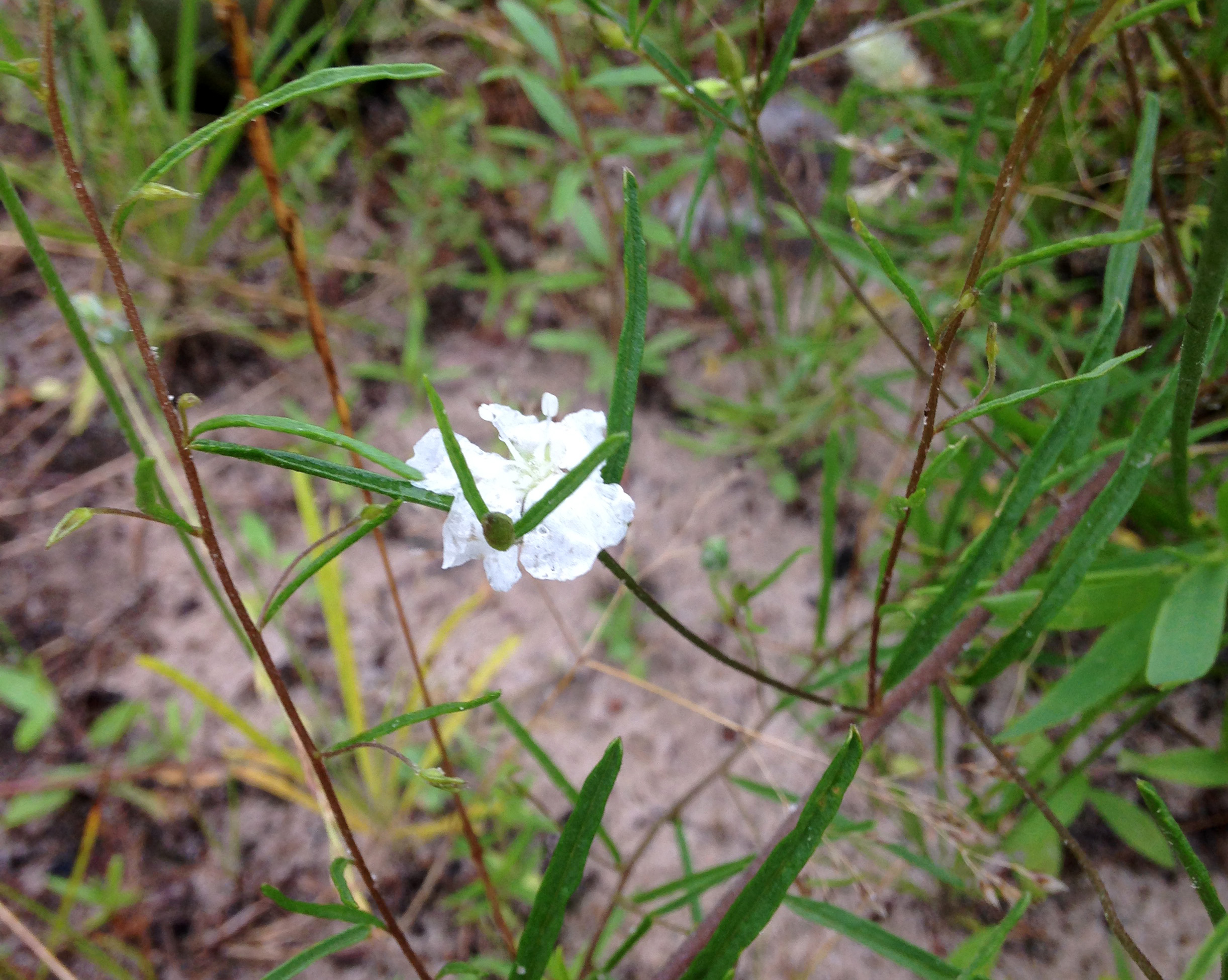

Scientific classification
- Kingdom: Plantae
- Clade: Tracheophytes
- Clade: Angiosperms
- Clade: Eudicots
- Clade: Asterids
- Order: Solanales
- Family: Convolvulaceae
- Genus: Stylisma
- Species: S. pickeringii

Binomial name
- Stylisma pickeringii (Torr. ex M.A.Curtis) A.Gray

= Stylisma pickeringii =

Species of flowering plant

Stylisma pickeringii, commonly called Pickering's dawnflower, is a species of flowering plant in the morning glory family (Convolvulaceae). It is native to the United States, where it is patchily distributed across central and eastern regions. Its natural habitat is in dry sandhill prairies. It is apparently tolerant of ecologically disturbed conditions, and can persist in degraded former sand prairies.

Stylisma pickeringii is perennial that grows sprawling across the ground. It has linear leaves 1-3 mm wide. It produces white flowers from May to August.

== Taxonomy ==
Two varieties of Stylisma pickeringii are currently recognized. They are:

- S. pickeringii var. pattersonii - Native to the South Central Region, the Great Plains, and the Midwest.
- S. pickeringii var. pickeringii - Native to the Southeastern United States and disjunct in New Jersey
