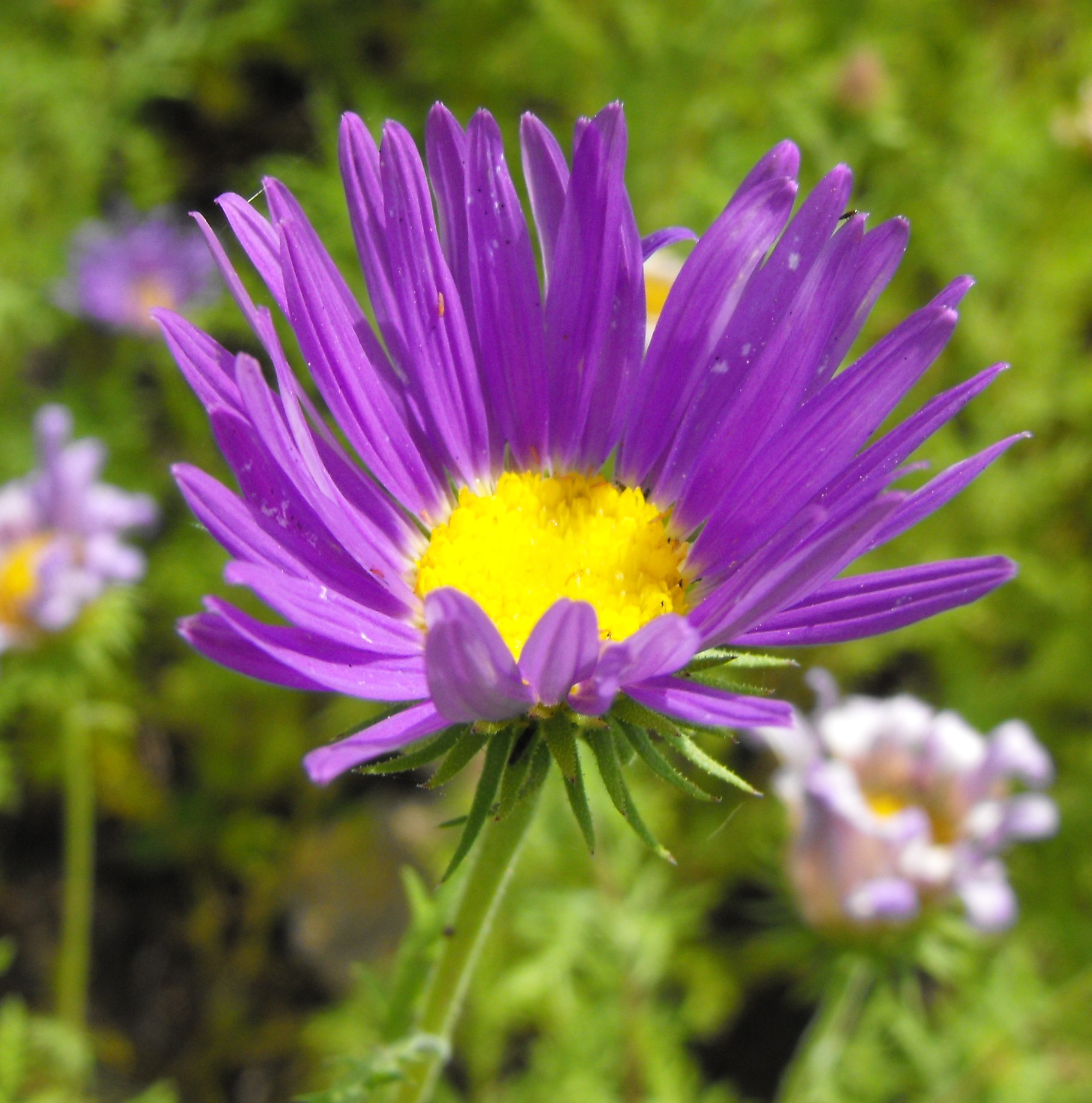
- Machaeranthera_tanacetifolia

Scientific classification
- Kingdom: Plantae
- Clade: Embryophytes
- Clade: Tracheophytes
- Clade: Spermatophytes
- Clade: Angiosperms
- Clade: Eudicots
- Clade: Asterids
- Order: Asterales
- Family: Asteraceae
- Subfamily: Asteroideae
- Tribe: Astereae
- Subtribe: Machaerantherinae
- Genus: Machaeranthera; Nees

Type species
- Aster tanacetifolius Kunth.

Synonyms
- Hesperastrum A.Gray; Aster sect. Machaeranthera (Nees) Benth. & Hook. f.; Aster subgen. Machaeranthera (Nees) A. Gray

= Machaeranthera =

Genus of flowering plants

Machaeranthera is a genus of North American flowering plants in the family Asteraceae which are known by the common name tansyaster.

Tansyasters are variable in appearance. Some are small, singular wildflowers, while others are sprawling shrubs. Several species easily hybridize with each other, as well, making identification difficult. In general, members of the genus may be identified by the sharp-pointed, dagger-shaped anthers in the disc florets at the center of the flower. The flower heads are usually daisylike, and are usually a shade of purple or blue, but may be pink, yellow, or white. Tansyasters are native to western North America.

The genus Machaeranthera is distinguished from the genus Dieteria by having once- or twice-pinnate leaves, whereas Dieteria has entire to toothed leaves.

Machaeranthera means "swordlike anthers".

Species

- Machaeranthera arenaria - Baja California Sur
- Machaeranthera carnosa - shrubby alkali aster - New Mexico, Arizona, California, Nevada, Sonora
- Machaeranthera coulteri - California, Sonora
- Machaeranthera crispa - Baja California Sur
- Machaeranthera crutchfieldii - Nuevo León
- Machaeranthera gracilis - slender goldenweed - California, Nevada, Utah, Colorado, Arizona, Nevada, Texas, Chihuahua
- Machaeranthera grindelioides - rayless tansyaster - from Arizona to Alberta
- Machaeranthera gypsophila - gypsum tansyaster - Coahuila
- Machaeranthera gypsitherma - New Mexico
- Machaeranthera heterophylla - Nuevo León
- Machaeranthera incisifolia - northern Baja California
- Machaeranthera johnstonii - Coahuila
- Machaeranthera juncea - rush bristleweed - California
- Machaeranthera pinnatifida - lacy tansyaster - Saskatchewan
- Machaeranthera restiformis - Coahuila
- Machaeranthera setigera - Mexico
- Machaeranthera stenoloba - Chihuahua
- Machaeranthera tagetina - mesa tansyaster - Sonora, Arizona, New Mexico
- Machaeranthera tanacetifolia - tansyleaf tansyaster - from Alberta to Zacatecas
- Machaeranthera tenuis - Nuevo León, Texas
- Machaeranthera turneri - Chihuahua
- Machaeranthera viscida - sticky tansyaster - Texas, New Mexico
- Machaeranthera wigginsii - northern Baja California
