= Gypsophila (disambiguation) =

Gypsophila can refer to the following scientific names:

- A plant genus in Caryophyllaceae
- A bird genus in Pellorneidae
- Agave gypsophila, a plant of Agave in Asparagaceae
- Psammophiliella muralis, a plant in Caryophyllaceae
- Calytrix gypsophila, a plant of Calytrix in Myrtaceae
- Eucalyptus gypsophila, a plant of Eucalyptus in Myrtaceae
- Calia gypsophila or Sophora gypsophila, a plant in Fabaceae
- Heterotheca gypsophila, a plant in Asteraceae
- Isocoma gypsophila, a plant in Asteraceae
- Solidago gypsophila, a plant in Asteraceae
- Marshalljohnstonia gypsophila, a plant in Asteraceae
