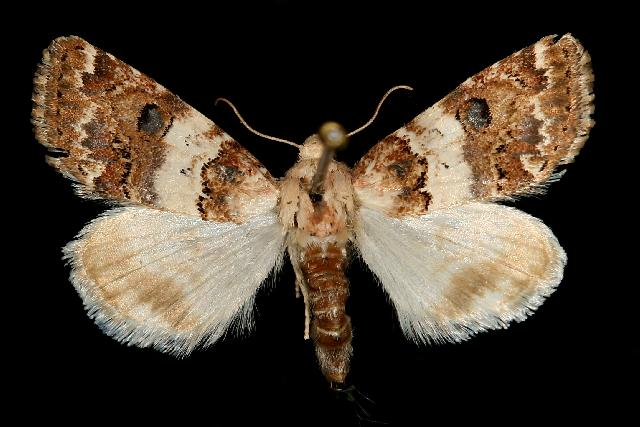

Scientific classification
- Domain: Eukaryota
- Kingdom: Animalia
- Phylum: Arthropoda
- Class: Insecta
- Order: Lepidoptera
- Superfamily: Noctuoidea
- Family: Noctuidae
- Genus: Schinia
- Species: S. tertia

Binomial name
- Schinia tertia (Grote, 1874)

Synonyms
- Tamila tertia Grote, 1874; Schinia megarena Smith, 1906

= Schinia tertia =

Species of moth

Schinia tertia is a moth of the family Noctuidae. It is found in the western parts of the United States from Minnesota and Illinois to Texas, west to California, north to Idaho.

The wingspan is about 25 mm. Adults are on wing from April to October in two generations.

The larvae feed on Ericameria, Isocoma pluriflora and Liatris.
