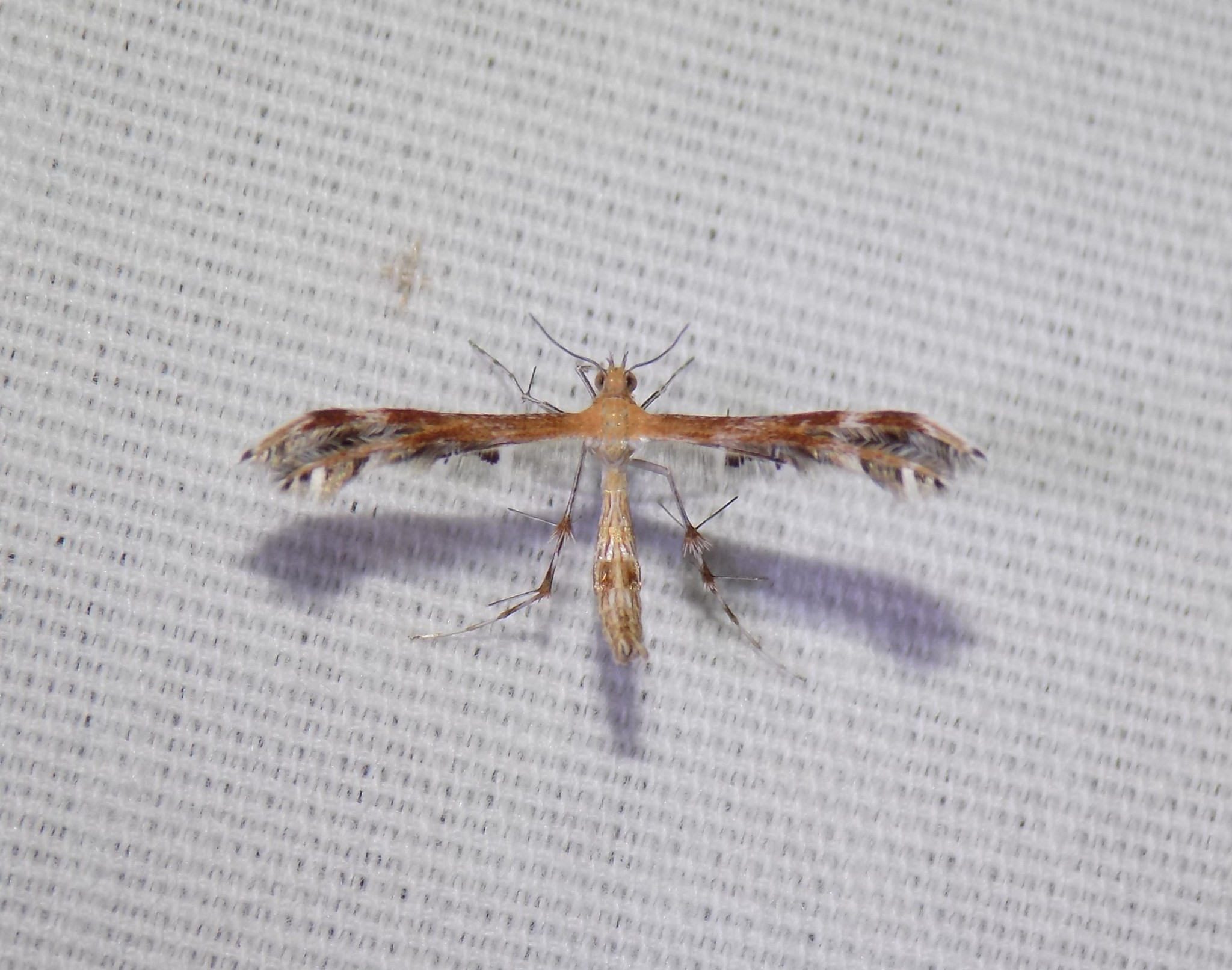

Scientific classification
- Domain: Eukaryota
- Kingdom: Animalia
- Phylum: Arthropoda
- Class: Insecta
- Order: Lepidoptera
- Family: Pterophoridae
- Genus: Dejongia
- Species: D. californicus

Binomial name
- Dejongia californicus (Walsingham, 1880)

Synonyms
- Aciptilus californica Walsingham, 1880; Trichoptilus californicus; Trichoptilus wrightii Grinnell, 1909

= Dejongia californicus =

Species of plume moth

Dejongia californicus is a moth of the family Pterophoridae. It is found in North America, including California and the south-eastern United States.

The wingspan is 14–26 millimetres (0.55–1.02 in).

The larvae feed on Asteraceae species, including Isocoma veneta and Grindelia species.
