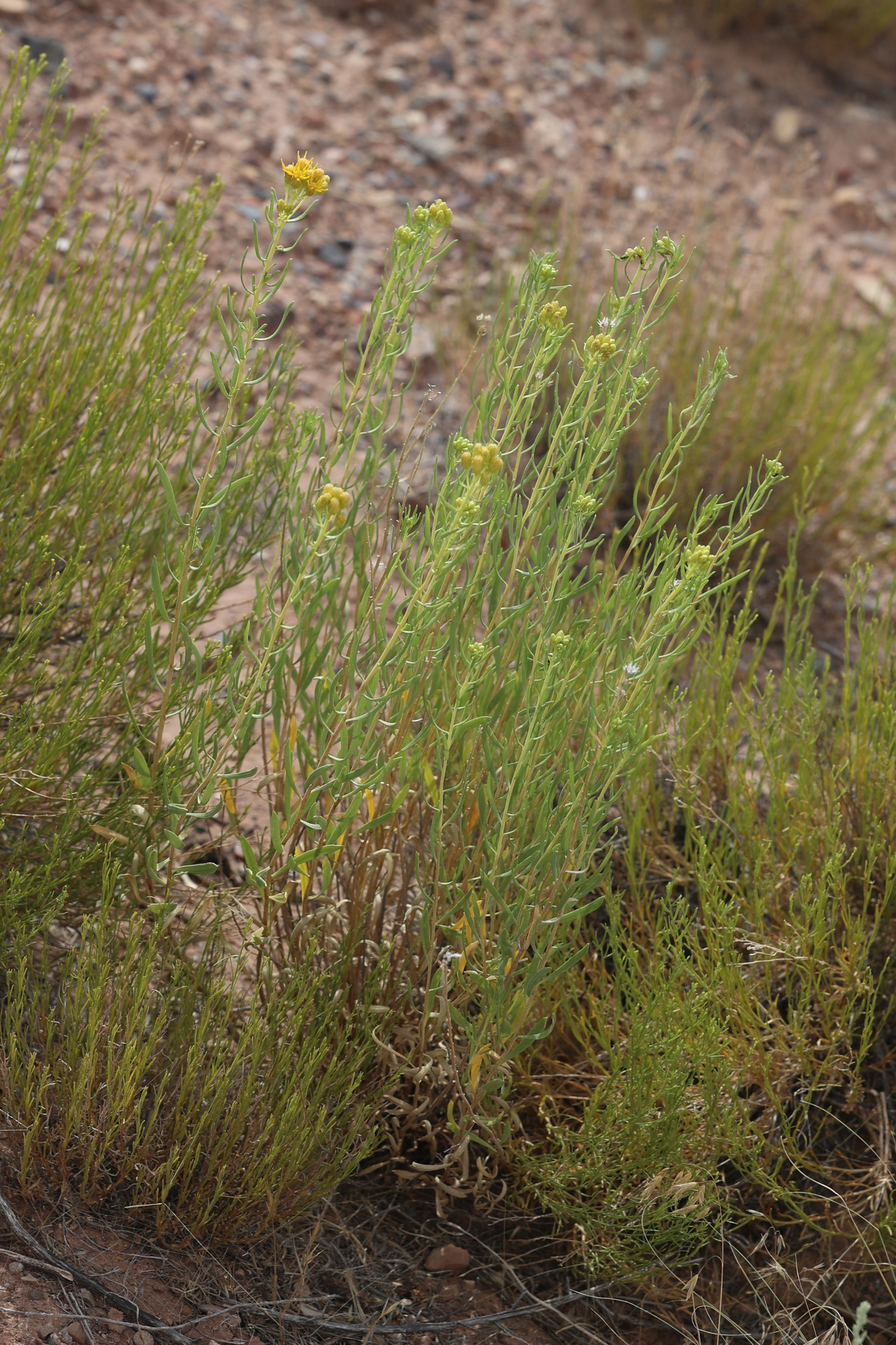

Conservation status
- Apparently Secure (NatureServe)

Scientific classification
- Kingdom: Plantae
- Clade: Tracheophytes
- Clade: Angiosperms
- Clade: Eudicots
- Clade: Asterids
- Order: Asterales
- Family: Asteraceae
- Genus: Isocoma
- Species: I. rusbyi

Binomial name
- Isocoma rusbyi Greene 1906

Synonyms
- Haplopappus rusbyi (Greene) Cronquist

= Isocoma rusbyi =

Species of flowering plant

Isocoma rusbyi, the Rusby's goldenbush or Rusby's jimmyweed is a North American species of plants in the family Asteraceae. It has been found in the States of Arizona, Utah, New Mexico, and Colorado in the southwestern United States. Some of the populations lie inside Grand Canyon and Petrified Forest National Parks, others in the Glen Canyon National Recreation Area.

Isocoma rusbyi is a shrub up to 90 cm (3 feet) tall. Each flower head contains about 19-25 disc flowers but no ray flowers.
