= Isocoma azteca =

Scientific classification
- Kingdom: Plantae
- Clade: Tracheophytes
- Clade: Angiosperms
- Clade: Eudicots
- Clade: Asterids
- Order: Asterales
- Family: Asteraceae
- Genus: Isocoma
- Species: I. azteca

Binomial name
- Isocoma azteca G.L.Nesom 1991

Species of flowering plant

Isocoma azteca, common names Apache jimmyweed or Aztec goldenbush, is a plant species native to Arizona and New Mexico. It grows on sandy to clay soils, often with Atriplex sp., at elevations of 1,500–1,800 m (4,900–5,900 ft).

Isocoma azteca is a shrub or subshrub up to 150 cm (59 in) tall. Herbage is glabrous or with scattered stipitate glands but not resinous. Leaves are narrow, oblong to oblanceolate, up to 50 mm (2.0 in) long, deeply lobed. Flowers are yellow with dark orange veins, 18-25 disc flowers per head.
