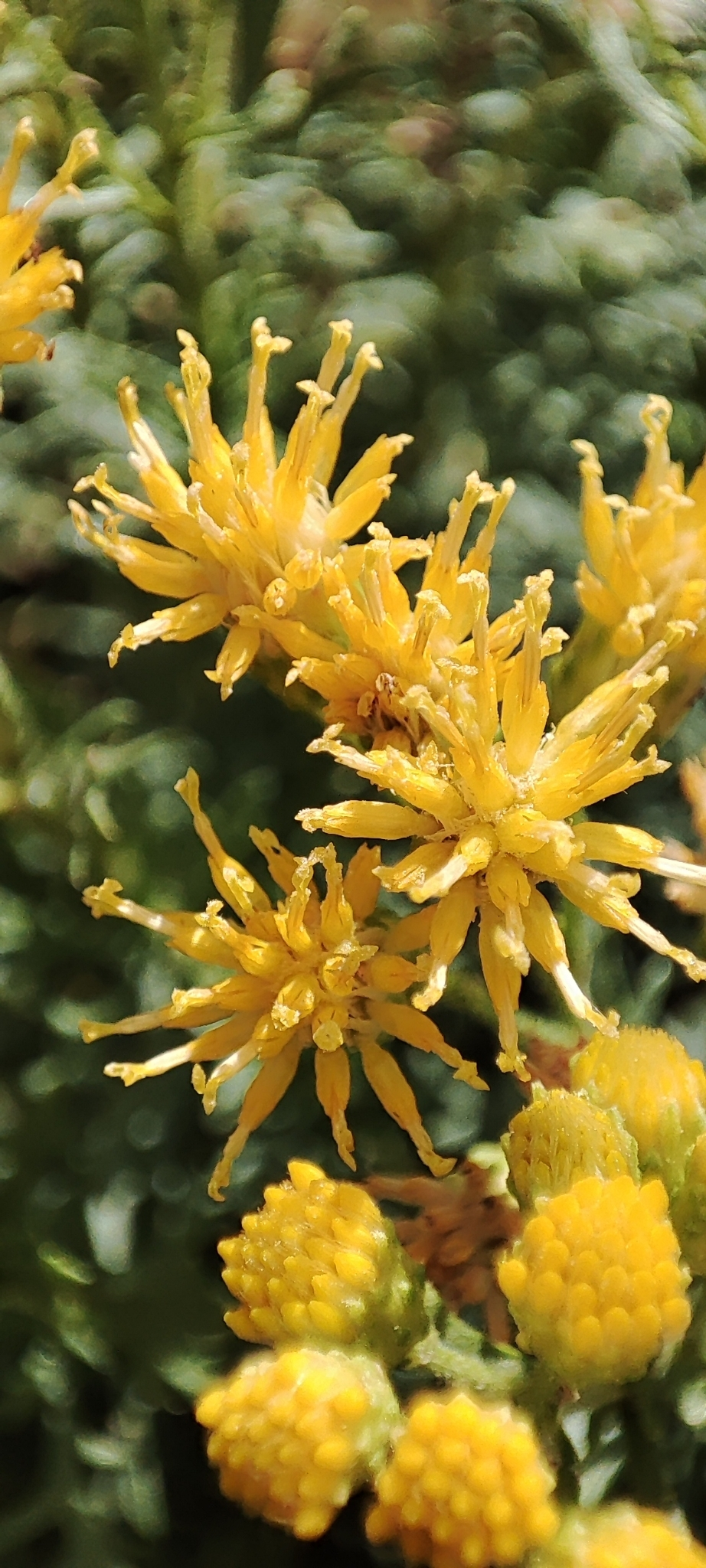

Scientific classification
- Kingdom: Plantae
- Clade: Tracheophytes
- Clade: Angiosperms
- Clade: Eudicots
- Clade: Asterids
- Order: Asterales
- Family: Asteraceae
- Genus: Isocoma
- Species: I. hartwegii

Binomial name
- Isocoma hartwegii (A.Gray) Greene 1894

Synonyms
- Aster hartwegii (A.Gray) Kuntze; Bigelowia hartwegii A.Gray 1884; Bigelovia hartwegi A.Gray 1884; Haplopappus hartwegii (A.Gray) S.F.Blake; Aplopappus hartwegi (A.Gray) S.F.Blake; Haplopappus venetus var. hartwegii (A.Gray) McVaugh

= Isocoma hartwegii =

Species of flowering plant

Isocoma hartwegii is a Mexican plant species in the family Asteraceae. It has been found in the states of Jalisco, Zacatecas, Aguascalientes, Hidalgo, Guanajuato, and San Luis Potosí.

Isocoma hartwegii is a subshrub. Each flower head has 13-22 disc flowers but no ray flowers.
