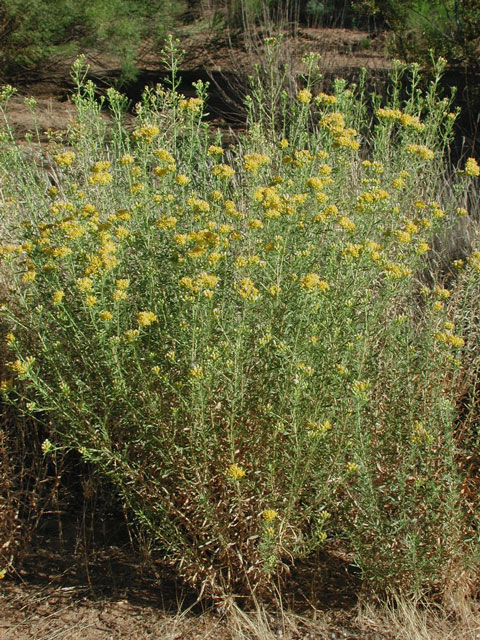
- Isocoma acradenia

Scientific classification
- Kingdom: Plantae
- Clade: Tracheophytes
- Clade: Angiosperms
- Clade: Eudicots
- Clade: Asterids
- Order: Asterales
- Family: Asteraceae
- Subfamily: Asteroideae
- Tribe: Astereae
- Subtribe: Machaerantherinae
- Genus: Isocoma; Nutt. 1840

Synonyms
- Haplopappus sect. Isocoma (Nutt.) H.M.Hall

= Isocoma =

Genus of shrubs

Isocoma, commonly called jimmyweed or goldenweed, is a genus of North American semi-woody shrubs in the family Asteraceae. It is found in the semi-arid areas of Southwestern United States and Mexico.

The name of this genus is derived from the Greek for "equal hair" referring to the pappus on the achene.

Isocoma species are used as food plants by the larvae of some Lepidoptera species including Schinia bicuspida (recorded on I. drummondii), Schinia erosa (feeds exclusively on I. acradenia) and Schinia tertia (recorded on I. pluriflora).

Species

- Isocoma acradenia (Greene) Greene - alkali goldenbush, alkali jimmyweed - Baja California, Sonora, California Arizona Nevada Utah
- Isocoma arguta Greene - Carquinez goldenbush - Solano County in California
- Isocoma azteca G.L.Nesom - Aztec goldenbush - Arizona New Mexico
- Isocoma coronopifolia (Gray) Greene - common goldenbush, goldenweed - southern Texas, Coahuila, Nuevo León, Tamaulipas
- Isocoma drummondii (Torr. & Gray) Greene - Drummond's goldenbush, Drummond's jimmyweed - southern Texas, Tamaulipas
- Isocoma felgeri G.L.Nesom - Sonora
- Isocoma gypsophila B.L.Turner - Zacatecas, Nuevo León
- Isocoma hartwegii (A.Gray) Greene - San Luis Potosí, Zacatecas, Guanajuato
- Isocoma humilis G.L.Nesom - Zion goldenbush - Utah (Kane + Washington Cos)
- Isocoma menziesii (Hook. & Arn.) G.L.Nesom - Menzies' goldenbush - Baja California, California
- Isocoma pluriflora (Torr. & Gray) Greene - rayless goldenrod, southern goldenbush, southern jimmyweed - Texas New Mexico Arizona Chihuahua
- Isocoma rusbyi Greene - Rusby's goldenbush - Arizona New Mexico Utah Colorado
- Isocoma tehuacana G.L.Nesom - Puebla
- Isocoma tenuisecta Greene - burrow goldenweed, burroweed - Arizona New Mexico
- Isocoma tomentosa G.L.Nesom - Chihuahua
- Isocoma veneta (Kunth) Greene - jimmyweed - Mexico from Coahuila to Oaxaca
