= Isocoma felgeri =

Scientific classification
- Kingdom: Plantae
- Clade: Tracheophytes
- Clade: Angiosperms
- Clade: Eudicots
- Clade: Asterids
- Order: Asterales
- Family: Asteraceae
- Genus: Isocoma
- Species: I. felgeri

Binomial name
- Isocoma felgeri G.L.Nesom 1991

Species of flowering plant

Isocoma felgeri is a rare Mexican plant species in the family Asteraceae. It has been found in the State of Sonora, in desert scrub near Bahía de Kino.

Isocoma felgeri is a shrub up to 120 cm (4 feet) tall. The plant produces flower heads in clusters on the tips of branches, each head containing 8-11 disc flowers but no ray flowers.
