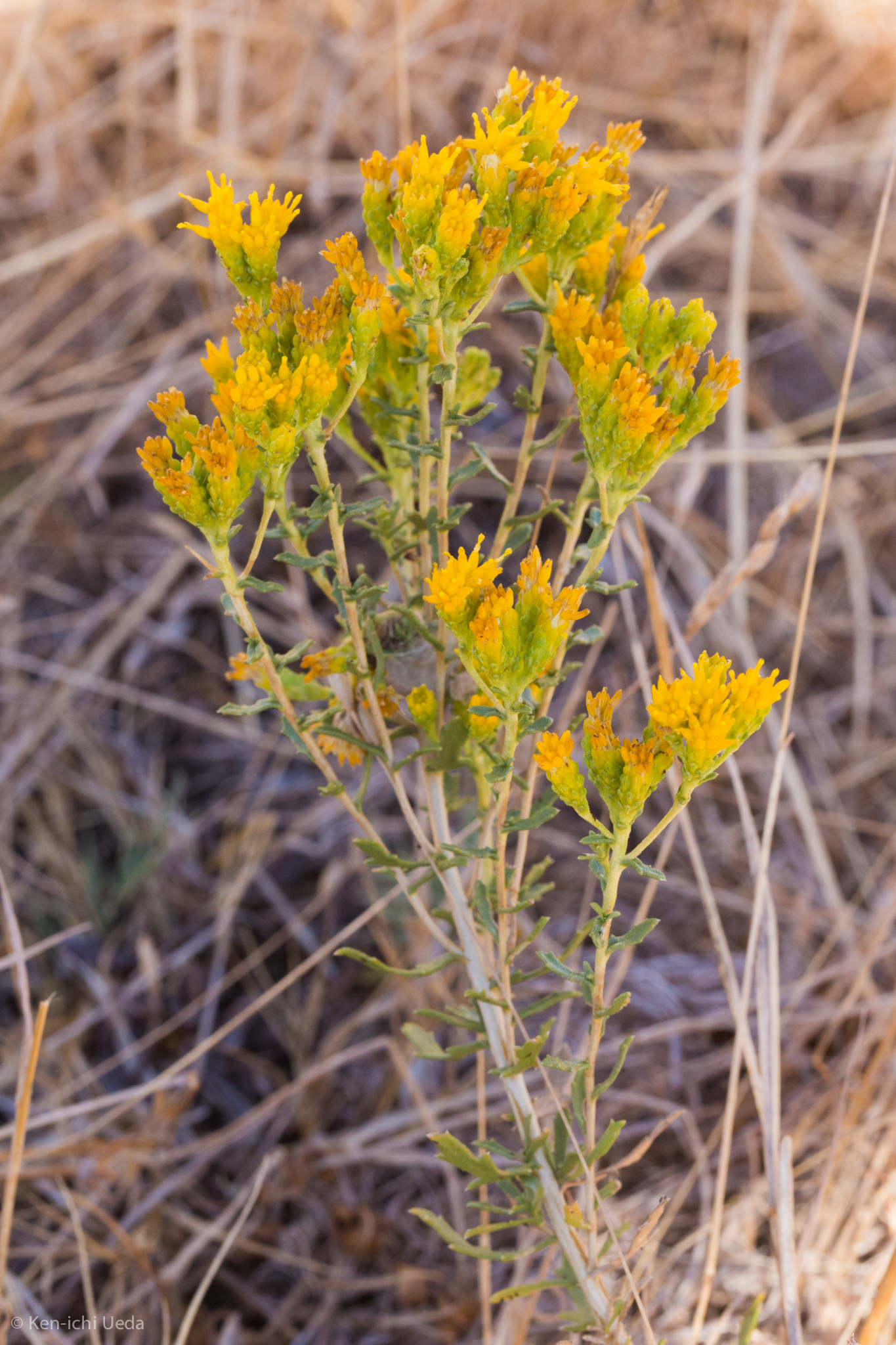

Conservation status
- Critically Imperiled (NatureServe)

Scientific classification
- Kingdom: Plantae
- Clade: Tracheophytes
- Clade: Angiosperms
- Clade: Eudicots
- Clade: Asterids
- Order: Asterales
- Family: Asteraceae
- Genus: Isocoma
- Species: I. arguta

Binomial name
- Isocoma arguta Greene 1894

Synonyms
- Haplopappus venetus var. argutus (Greene) D.D. Keck; Isocoma veneta var. arguta (Greene) Jeps.

= Isocoma arguta =

Species of flowering plant

Isocoma arguta is a rare species of flowering plant in the family Asteraceae known by the common name Carquinez goldenbush. It has been found only in Solano and Contra Costa Counties in California, where it grows in the Sacramento-San Joaquin River Delta. It is a resident of Suisun Marsh. It thrives on alkali flats and other mineral-rich soils.

== Description ==
Isocoma arguta is a compact subshrub reaching about half a meter-1.5 feet (20-60 inches) tall and wide with erect, multibranched stems. The hairy stems bear small gray-green, nonfleshy, glandular leaves each less than 2 centimetres (0.79 in) long.

The inflorescences hold clusters of thick, knobby flower heads. Each head is a capsule of layered greenish glandular phyllaries with an array of 10-13 cylindrical, protruding golden yellow disc florets at one end. There are no ray florets.
