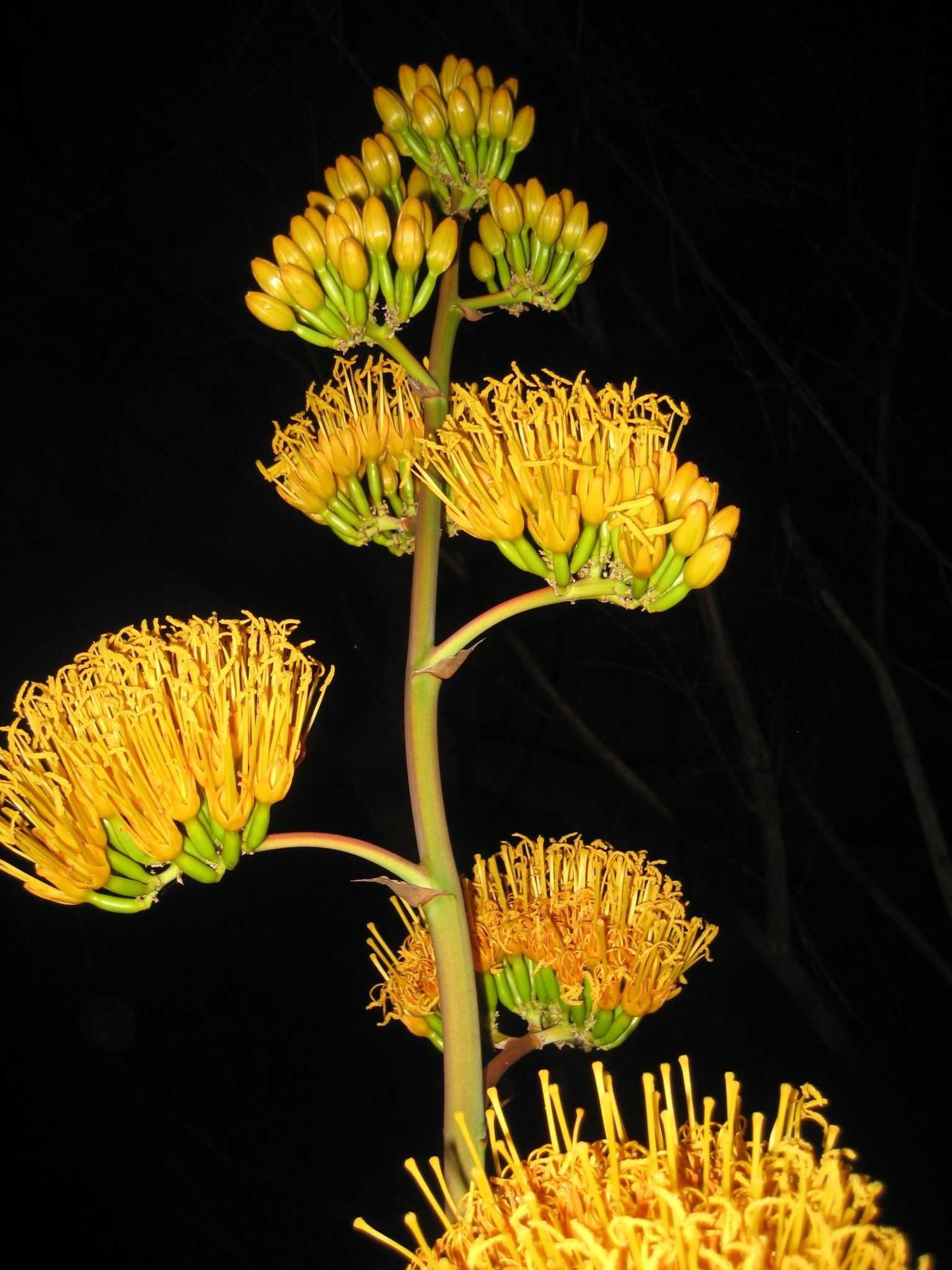

Conservation status
- Endangered (IUCN 3.1)

Scientific classification
- Kingdom: Plantae
- Clade: Embryophytes
- Clade: Tracheophytes
- Clade: Angiosperms
- Clade: Monocots
- Order: Asparagales
- Family: Asparagaceae
- Subfamily: Agavoideae
- Genus: Agave
- Species: A. abisaii

Binomial name
- Agave abisaii A.Vázquez & Nieves

= Agave abisaii =

Species of flowering plant

Agave abisaii is a species of agave plant that grows on limestone outcroppings in western Mexico. Its appearance resembles Agave gypsophila.
