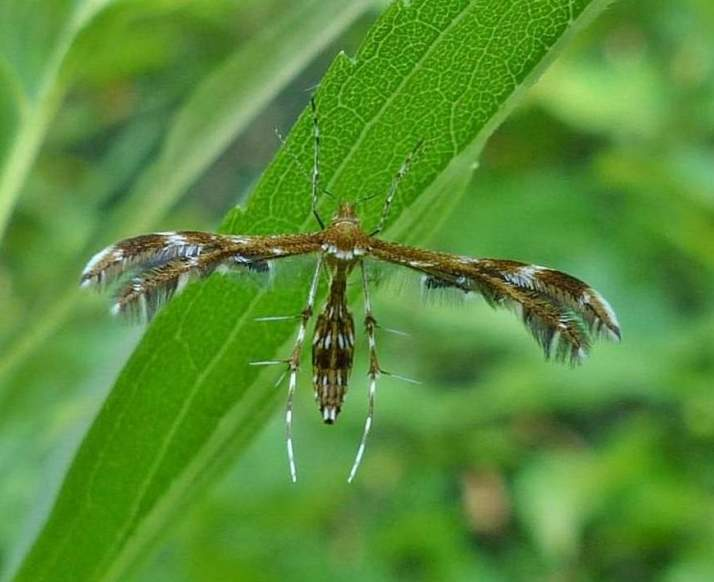

Scientific classification
- Domain: Eukaryota
- Kingdom: Animalia
- Phylum: Arthropoda
- Class: Insecta
- Order: Lepidoptera
- Family: Pterophoridae
- Genus: Dejongia
- Species: D. lobidactylus

Binomial name
- Dejongia lobidactylus (Fitch, 1855)

Synonyms
- Pterophorus lobidactylus Fitch, 1855; Trichoptilus lobidactylus

= Dejongia lobidactylus =

Species of plume moth

Dejongia lobidactylus is a moth of the family Pterophoridae. It is found in the north-eastern United States and central Canada (Quebec and Ontario).

The wingspan is 17–20 millimetres (0.67–0.79 in). The head is greyish-brown, with a white line over each eye. The thorax is brown, although much lighter posteriorly. The abdomen is dark brown, with diverging white lines on some segments. The forewings are dark cinnamon brown. An oblique stripe of pale yellow or white crosses the basal third of the first lobe, cutting the brown fringe on each side of the lobe. Traces of this stripe are sometimes seen on the second lobe, especially in the fringe on the hind margin. There are also indications of a second stripe on the outer third of the lobes, as shown by a few light scales and the white in the fringes, which are dark elsewhere except on the apical end of the costa. The hindwings and fringes are dark brown, with a cluster of black scales in the hind fringe a little beyond the middle, preceded by white and the fringe at the apex is also white.

Adults are on wing from June to August.

The larvae have been recorded feeding on the terminal buds Solidago species.
