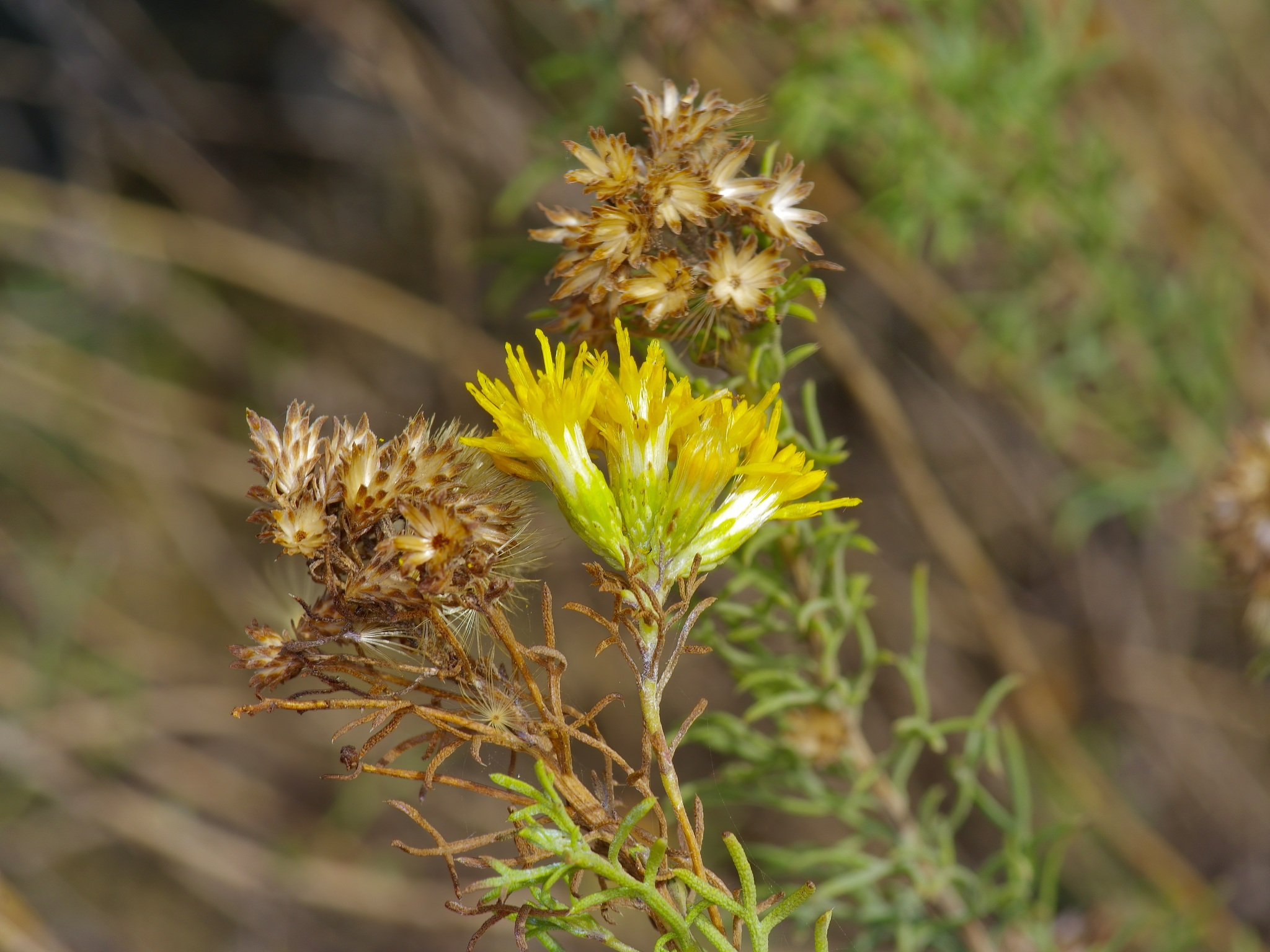

Scientific classification
- Kingdom: Plantae
- Clade: Tracheophytes
- Clade: Angiosperms
- Clade: Eudicots
- Clade: Asterids
- Order: Asterales
- Family: Asteraceae
- Genus: Isocoma
- Species: I. coronopifolia

Binomial name
- Isocoma coronopifolia (A.Gray) Greene 1894

Synonyms
- Synonymy: Aster coronopifolius (A.Gray) Kuntze; Bigelowia coronopifolia (A.Gray) A.Gray; Bigelovia coronopifolia (A.Gray) A.Gray; Isocoma coronopifolia var. pedicellata (Greene) G.L.Nesom; Isocoma pedicellata Greene; Linosyris coronopifolia A.Gray 1852

= Isocoma coronopifolia =

Species of flowering plant

Isocoma coronopifolia, the common goldenbush, is a North American plant species in the family Asteraceae. It has been found on both sides of the Río Grande, in Tamaulipas, Coahuila, Nuevo León, Chihuahua, and southern Texas.

Isocoma coronopifolia is a shrub up to 120 cm (4 feet) tall. The plant produces flower heads in clusters on the tips of branches, each head containing 12-15 disc flowers but no ray flowers.
