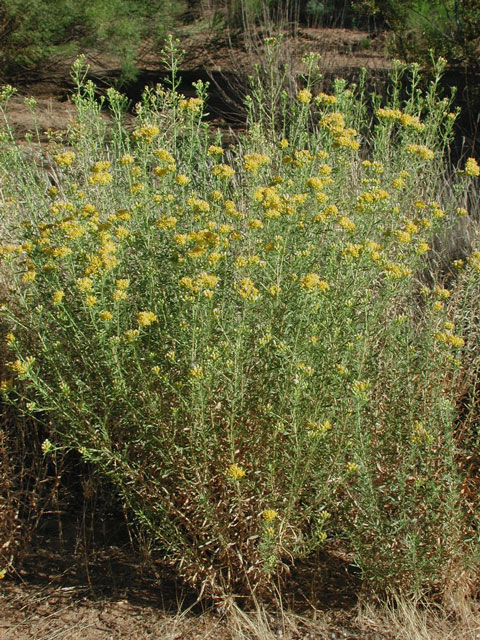

Scientific classification
- Kingdom: Plantae
- Clade: Tracheophytes
- Clade: Angiosperms
- Clade: Eudicots
- Clade: Asterids
- Order: Asterales
- Family: Asteraceae
- Genus: Isocoma
- Species: I. acradenia

Binomial name
- Isocoma acradenia (Greene) Greene 1894

Synonyms
- Synonymy: Bigelowia acradenia Greene 1883; Bigelovia acradenia Greene 1883; Haplopappus acradenia (Greene) S.F.Blake; Isocoma veneta var. acradenia (Greene) H.M. Hall; Aster acradenius (Greene) Kuntze; Haplopappus acradenius (Greene) S.F.Blake; Isocoma limitanea Rose & Standl.; Isocoma veneta var. acradenia (Greene) H.M.Hall; Isocoma eremophila Greene; Isocoma bracteosa Greene

= Isocoma acradenia =

Species of flowering plant

Isocoma acradenia is a North American species of flowering plant in the family Asteraceae known by the common name alkali goldenbush.

It is native to the Southwestern United States (California, Nevada, Utah, Arizona) and northwestern Mexico (Sonora, Baja California). It grows in arid, sandy areas, particularly mineral-rich areas such as alkali flats and gypsum soils.

== Description ==
Isocoma acradenia is a bushy subshrub reaching maximum heights of slightly over 1 m (39 in). It produces erect, branching stems which are a shiny pale yellowish white, aging to a yellow-gray.

Along the tough, hard-surfaced stems are linear or oval-shaped glandular leaves 1–6 cm (0.39–2.36 in) long, sometimes with stumpy teeth along the edges. They are gray-green and age to pale gray or tan.

The inflorescences along the top parts of the stem branches are clusters of four or five flower heads. Each head is a capsule encased in bumpy, glandular greenish phyllaries bearing many golden yellow disc florets at its mouth. Each disc floret is somewhat cylindrical and protruding.

The fruit is an achene a few millimeters long, with a yellowish pappus adding another few millimeters.

Varieties

- Isocoma acradenia var. acradenia - Salt scrub, often with creosote - Arizona, California, Nevada, Sonora
- Isocoma acradenia var. bracteosa (Greene) G. L. Nesom - salt flats - southern Central Valley in California
- Isocoma acradenia var. eremophila (Greene) G. L. Nesom - sandy soils, dunes, etc. - Arizona, California, Nevada, Utah, Baja California, Sonora).
