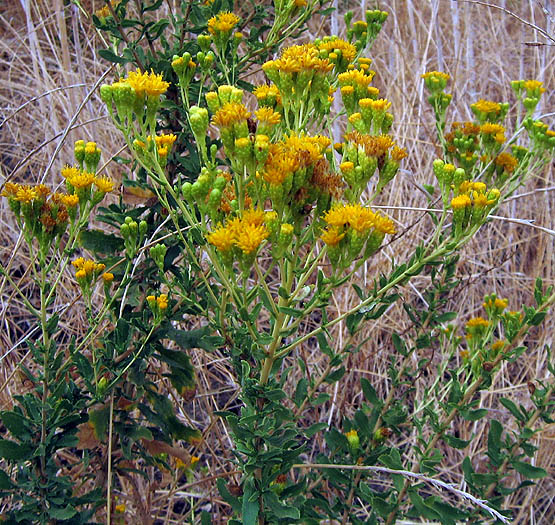

Scientific classification
- Kingdom: Plantae
- Clade: Embryophytes
- Clade: Tracheophytes
- Clade: Spermatophytes
- Clade: Angiosperms
- Clade: Eudicots
- Clade: Asterids
- Order: Asterales
- Family: Asteraceae
- Genus: Isocoma
- Species: I. menziesii

Binomial name
- Isocoma menziesii (Hook. & Arn.) G.L.Nesom 1991

Synonyms
- Synonymy: Bigelowia menziesii (Hook. & Arn.) A.Gray; Haplopappus fasciculatus Vasey & Rose; Haplopappus menziesii (Hook. & Arn.) Torr. & A.Gray; Isocoma oxyphylla Greene; Pyrrocoma menziesii Hook. & Arn. 1839; Bigelowia furfuracea Greene; Isocoma decumbens Greene; Isocoma sedoides (Greene) Greene; Bigelowia tridentata Greene; Haplopappus tridentatus (Greene) S.F.Blake; Isocoma tridentata (Greene) Greene; Linosyris dentata Kellogg; Isocoma latifolia Greene; Isocoma leucanthemifolia Greene; Isocoma microdonta Greene; Isocoma vernonioides Nutt.; Isocoma villosa Greene

= Isocoma menziesii =

Species of flowering plant

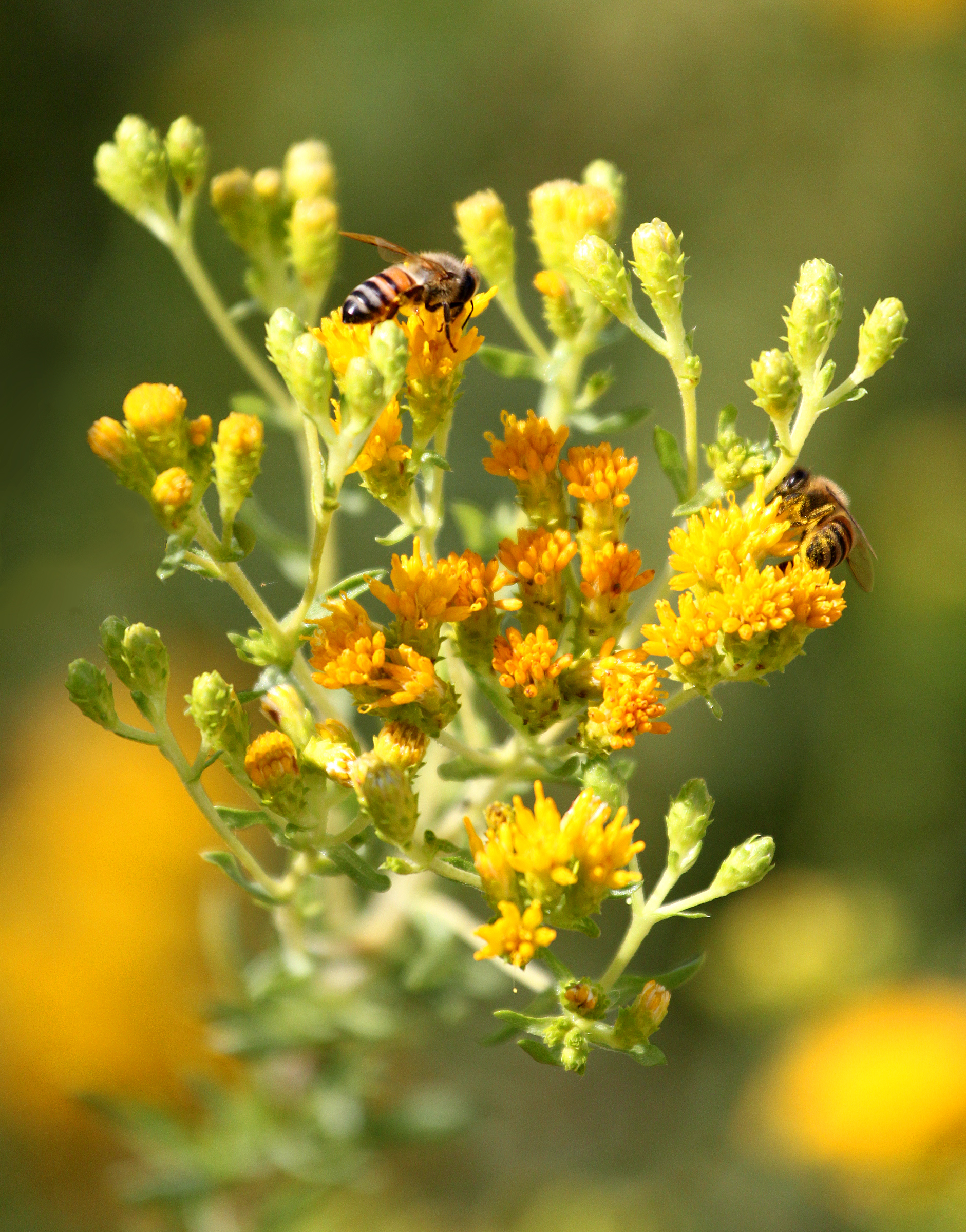
Isocoma menziesii in the Santa Ana Mountains.

Isocoma menziesii is a species of flowering plant in the family Asteraceae, known by the common name Menzies' goldenbush.

It is native to California, Baja California, and Baja California Sur, where it grows in coastal and inland habitat such as chaparral, particularly in sandy soils.

== Description ==
Isocoma menziesii is a subshrub forming a matted bush reaching heights of 1–2 m (39–79 in). The erect branching stems may be hairless to woolly, are generally glandular, and vary in color from gray-green to reddish brown.

The leaves are oval-shaped to somewhat rectangular, gray-green and sometimes hairy and glandular, and 1–5 cm (0.39–1.97 in) long with stumpy teeth along the edges.

The abundant inflorescences are clusters of thick flower heads. Each head is a capsule with layers of thick, pointed, greenish phyllaries. The head is filled with large, protruding, cylindrical yellow disc florets with long stigmas.

== Varieties ==
- Isocoma menziesii var. decumbens (Greene) G.L.Nesom – far northern Baja California, San Diego County, Channel Islands
- Isocoma menziesii var. diabolica G. L. Nesom – Santa Clara + San Benito Counties
- Isocoma menziesii var. menziesii – Baja California, Baja California Sur, San Diego County, Orange County, western Riverside County, Channel Islands
- Isocoma menziesii var. sedoides (Greene) G.L.Nesom – from Orange to San Luis Obispo Counties including Channel Islands
- Isocoma menziesii var. tridentata (Greene) G.L.Nesom – southern Baja California including Isla Cedros, northern Baja California Sur
- Isocoma menziesii var. vernonioides (Nutt.) G.L.Nesom – from Monterey County to northern Baja California
