= Isocoma tomentosa =

Scientific classification
- Kingdom: Plantae
- Clade: Tracheophytes
- Clade: Angiosperms
- Clade: Eudicots
- Clade: Asterids
- Order: Asterales
- Family: Asteraceae
- Genus: Isocoma
- Species: I. tomentosa

Binomial name
- Isocoma tomentosa G.L.Nesom 1991

Species of flowering plant

Isocoma tomentosa is a rare Mexican species of plants in the family Asteraceae. It has been found only in the state of Chihuahua in northern Mexico. As of 1991, it was known from only one location near a hot spring southeast of Chihuahua City.

Isocoma tomentosa is a subshrub up to 70 cm (28 inches) tall, forming clumps of numerous stems. Stems and leaves are covered with a dense coating of white wooly hairs. The plant produces flower heads in small rounded clusters at the tips of branches, each head with 17-27 disc flowers but no ray flowers.
