= Isocoma humilis =

Scientific classification
- Kingdom: Plantae
- Clade: Tracheophytes
- Clade: Angiosperms
- Clade: Eudicots
- Clade: Asterids
- Order: Asterales
- Family: Asteraceae
- Genus: Isocoma
- Species: I. humilis

Binomial name
- Isocoma humilis G.L.Nesom 1991 not Haplopappus humilis Reiche 1902

Synonyms
- Haplopappus leverichiic Cronquist 1994

Species of flowering plant

Isocoma humilis, common names Zion goldenbush or Zion jimmyweed, is a rare North American plant species in the family Asteraceae. It has been found only in southern Utah in the United States. Some of the populations lie inside Zion National Park.

Isocoma humilis is a low, branching shrub rarely more than 8 cm (3 in) tall. Herbage is covered with copious hairs. Leaves are narrow, oblong to oblanceolate, up to 50 mm (2.0 in) long, deeply lobed. Each flower head is up to 7 mm (0.28 in) wide (fairly large for the genus) and has 19-28 disc flowers but no ray flowers.
