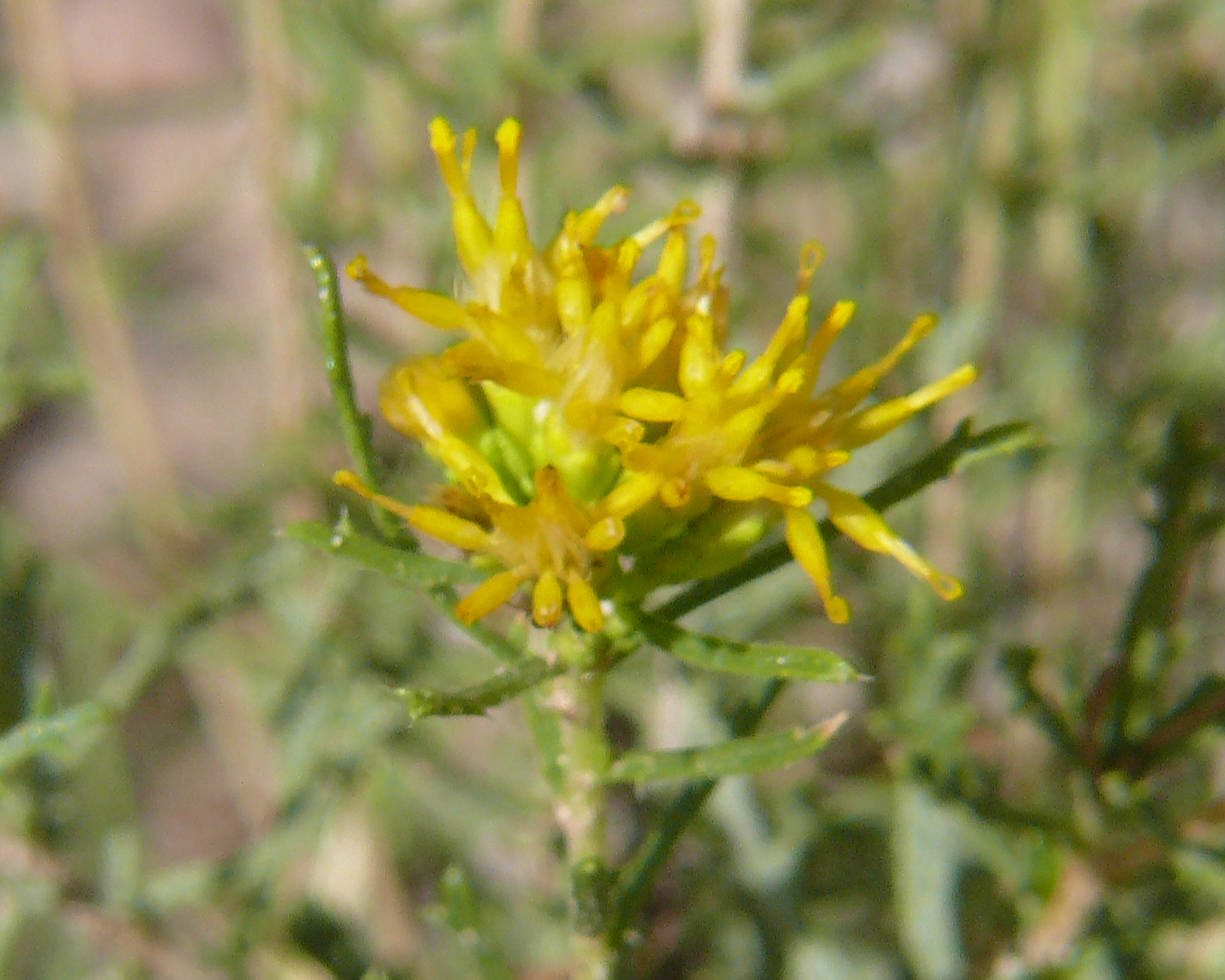

Scientific classification
- Kingdom: Plantae
- Clade: Tracheophytes
- Clade: Angiosperms
- Clade: Eudicots
- Clade: Asterids
- Order: Asterales
- Family: Asteraceae
- Genus: Isocoma
- Species: I. tenuisecta

Binomial name
- Isocoma tenuisecta Greene 1906

Synonyms
- Haplopappus fruticosus (Rose & Standl.) S.F.Blake; Haplopappus tenuisectus (Greene) S.F.Blake; Aplopappus fruticosus (Rose & Standl.) S.F.Blake; Aplopappus tenuisectus (Greene) S.F.Blake; Isocoma fruticosa Rose & Standl.

= Isocoma tenuisecta =

Species of flowering plant

Isocoma tenuisecta, commonly called burroweed, shrine jimmyweed, or burrow goldenweed is a North American species of small, flowering perennial herbs in the family Asteraceae. It is native to Arizona, New Mexico, and Sonora.

Isocoma tenuisecta grows 1 to 3 feet (30–90 cm) tall. Leaves are narrowly lance-shaped, with numerous large teeth or small lobes along the edges. The leaves are glandular and lobed. The plant flowers in September through November, with clusters of heads at the ends of branches and on top of the main stem. Each head contains 8-15 yellow disc flowers but no ray flowers. The old heads turn dry and tan and remain on the plant after the achenes have dispersed.

Burroweed is poisonous to mammals, including cattle, which can transfer the poison to humans through milk.

== Gallery ==
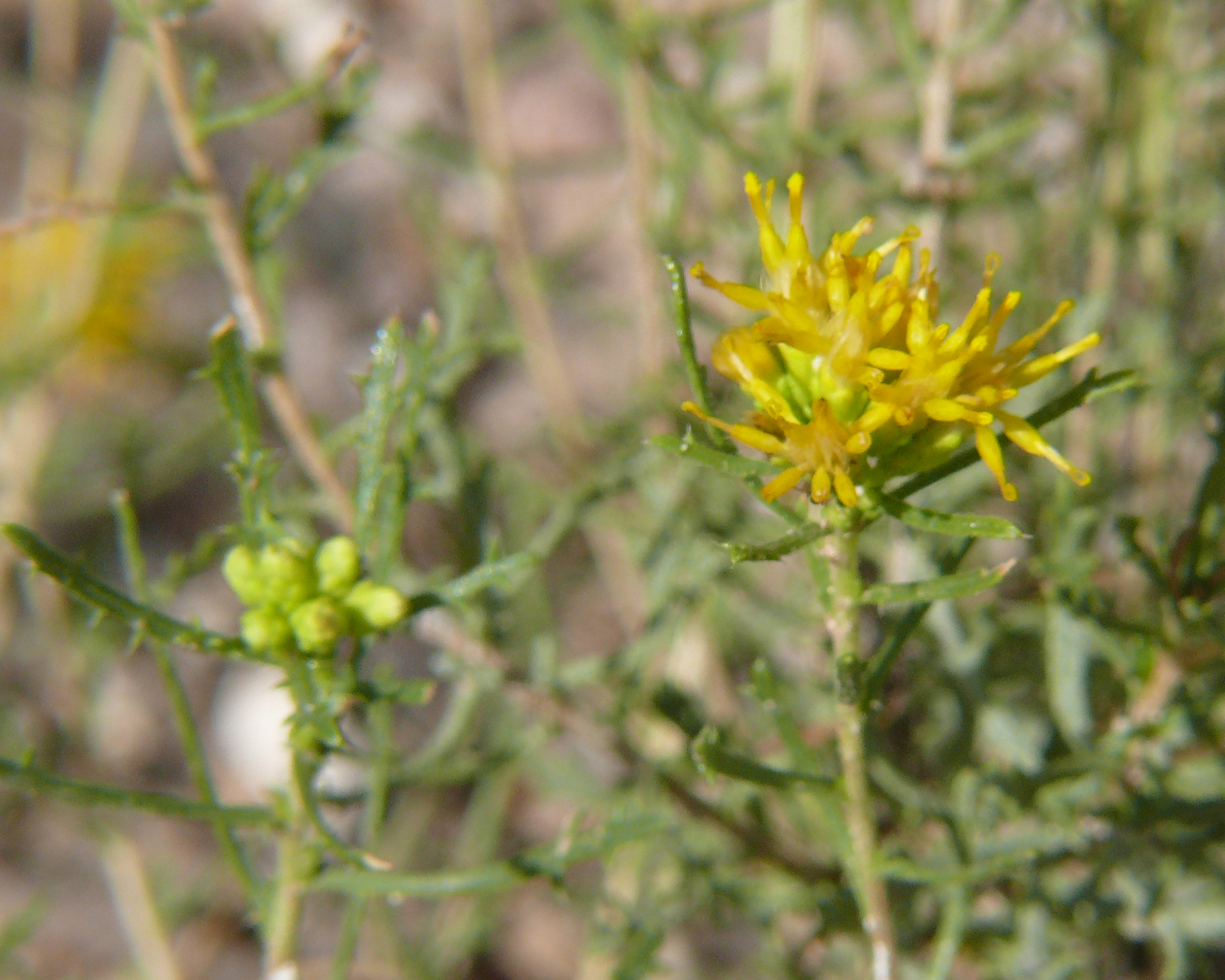

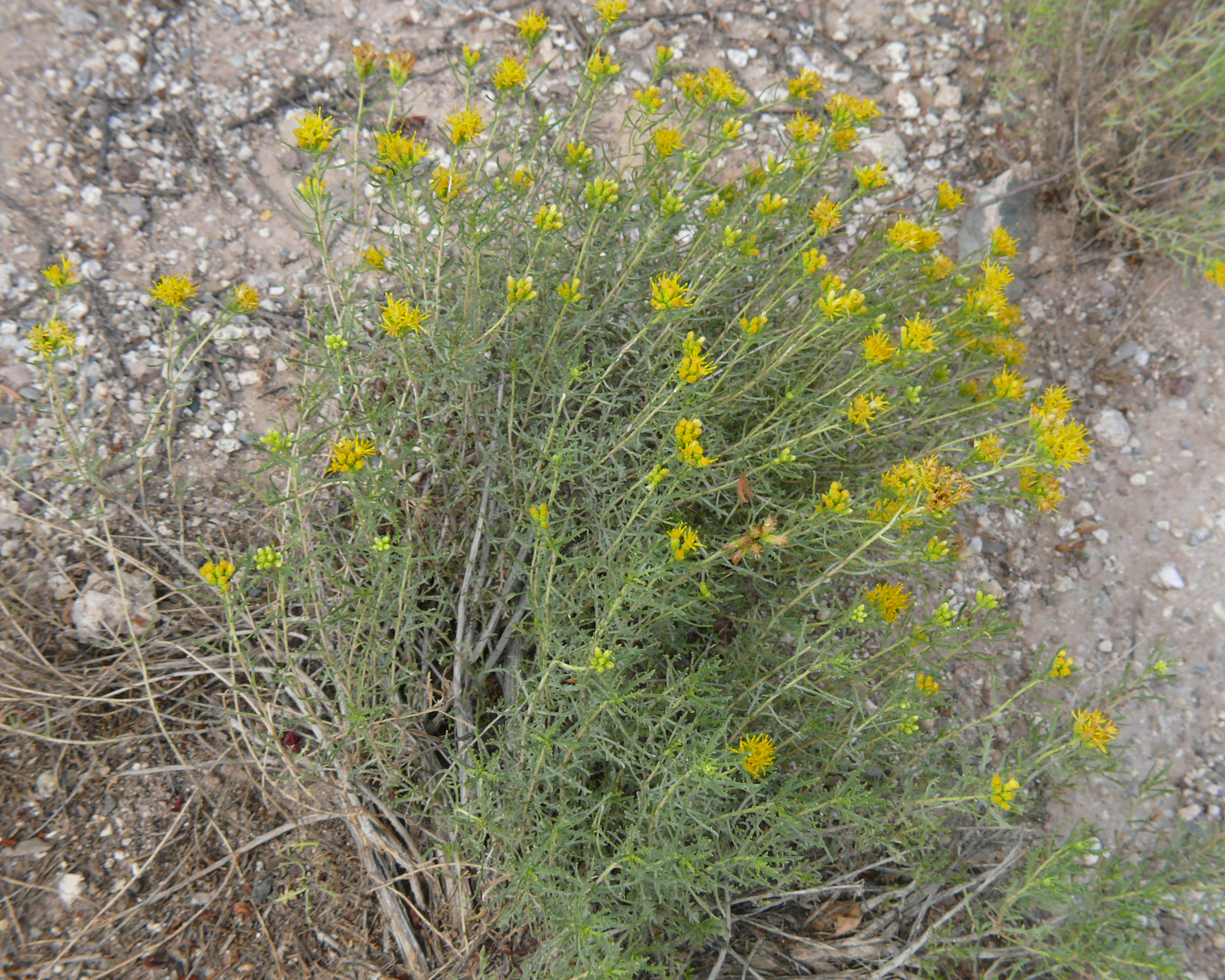
