= Isocoma tehuacana =

Scientific classification
- Kingdom: Plantae
- Clade: Tracheophytes
- Clade: Angiosperms
- Clade: Eudicots
- Clade: Asterids
- Order: Asterales
- Family: Asteraceae
- Genus: Isocoma
- Species: I. tehuacana

Binomial name
- Isocoma tehuacana G.L.Nesom 1991

Species of flowering plant

Isocoma tehuacana is a rare Mexican species of plants in the family Asteraceae. It has been found only in the State of Puebla in eastern Mexico. As of 1991, it was known from only one collection made in 1841, so the species is most likely extinct.

Isocoma tehuacana is a subshrub up to 30 cm (1 foot) tall, forming clumps of numerous stems. Stems and leaves are covered with hairs. Each flower head contains about 20 disc flowers but no ray flowers.
