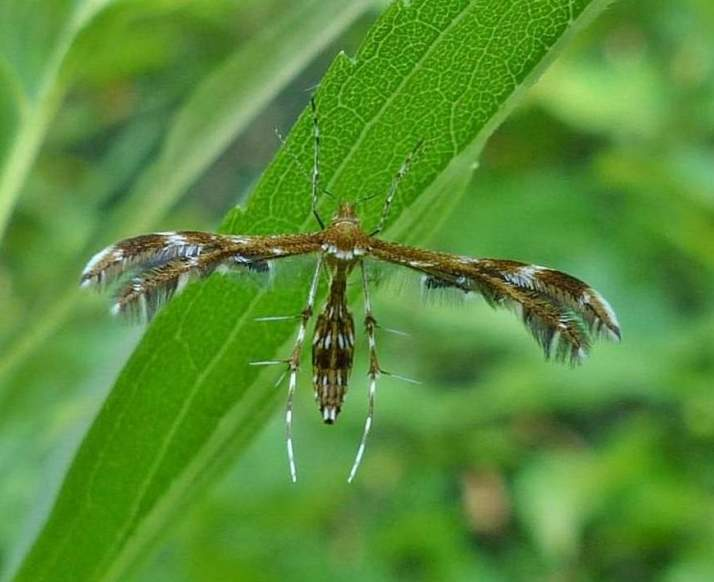
- Dejongia lobidactylus

Scientific classification
- Domain: Eukaryota
- Kingdom: Animalia
- Phylum: Arthropoda
- Class: Insecta
- Order: Lepidoptera
- Family: Pterophoridae
- Tribe: Oxyptilini
- Genus: Dejongia; Gielis, 1993

= Dejongia =

Plume moth genus

Dejongia is a genus of moths in the family Pterophoridae. The genus is named after Dr R. de Jong from the National Museum of Natural History (Leiden), in recognition for his "help and advice to solve phylogenetic problems".

== Species ==
Three species are recognized:

- Dejongia californicus (Walsingham, 1880)
- Dejongia lobidactylus (Fitch, 1855)
- Dejongia wrightii (Grinnell, 1908)
