= Calytrix gypsophila =

Conservation status
- Priority Two — Poorly Known Taxa (DEC)

Scientific classification
- Kingdom: Plantae
- Clade: Tracheophytes
- Clade: Angiosperms
- Clade: Eudicots
- Clade: Rosids
- Order: Myrtales
- Family: Myrtaceae
- Genus: Calytrix
- Species: C. gypsophila

Binomial name
- Calytrix gypsophila Craven

Species of plant

Calytrix gypsophila, commonly known as gypsum fringle-myrtle, is a species of flowering plant in the myrtle family Myrtaceae and is endemic to southern continental Australia. It is a glabrous shrub with oblong, linear or lance-shaped leaves with the narrower end towards the base, and white flowers with 25 to 40 stamens in a single row.

== Description ==
Calytrix gypsophila is a glabrous shrub that typically grows to a height of 2 m (6 ft 7 in). Its leaves are oblong, linear or lance-shaped with the narrower end towards the base, 1.0–3.5 mm (0.039–0.138 in) long, 0.5–1 mm (0.020–0.039 in) wide on a petiole 0.3–0.7 mm (0.012–0.028 in) long. There are stipules up to 0.8 mm (0.031 in) long at the base of the petiole. The flowers are borne on a peduncle 3.5–5 mm (0.14–0.20 in) long with more or less round to elliptic lobes 1.5–2.0 mm (0.059–0.079 in) long. The floral tube is free from the style, 7.5–9.5 mm (0.30–0.37 in) and has 10 ribs. The sepals are fused at the base, with elliptic, round or broadly elliptic lobes 1.5–2.25 mm (0.059–0.089 in) long and 1.6–2.5 mm (0.063–0.098 in) long, with an awn up to 9 mm (0.35 in) long. The petals are white, elliptic to narrowly elliptic, 6.0–7.3 mm (0.24–0.29 in) long and 1.75–3.0 mm (0.069–0.118 in) wide, and there are 25 to 40 stamens in a single row. Flowering occurs from February to July or September and the fruit is a nut, 15 mm (0.59 in) long and 2 mm (0.079 in) wide with wings and the awns at the end.

== Taxonomy ==
Calytrix gypsophila was first formally described in 1987 by Lyndley Craven in the journal Brunonia from specimens collected about 150 km (93 mi) west of the homestead on Commonwealth Hill Station in 1971. The specific epithet (gypsophila) means 'white plaster-loving', referring to the gypseous habitat of this species.

== Distribution and habitat ==
This species of Calytrix grows in littoral samphire and mallee shrublands on gypseous sands around salt lakes and claypans between the Serpentine Lakes and Lake Torrens in South Australia and in the Great Victoria Desert and Nullarbor bioregions of Western Australia.

== Conservation status ==
Calytrix gypsophila is listed as "Priority Two" by the Government of Western Australia Department of Biodiversity, Conservation and Attractions, meaning that it is poorly known and from one or a few locations.
