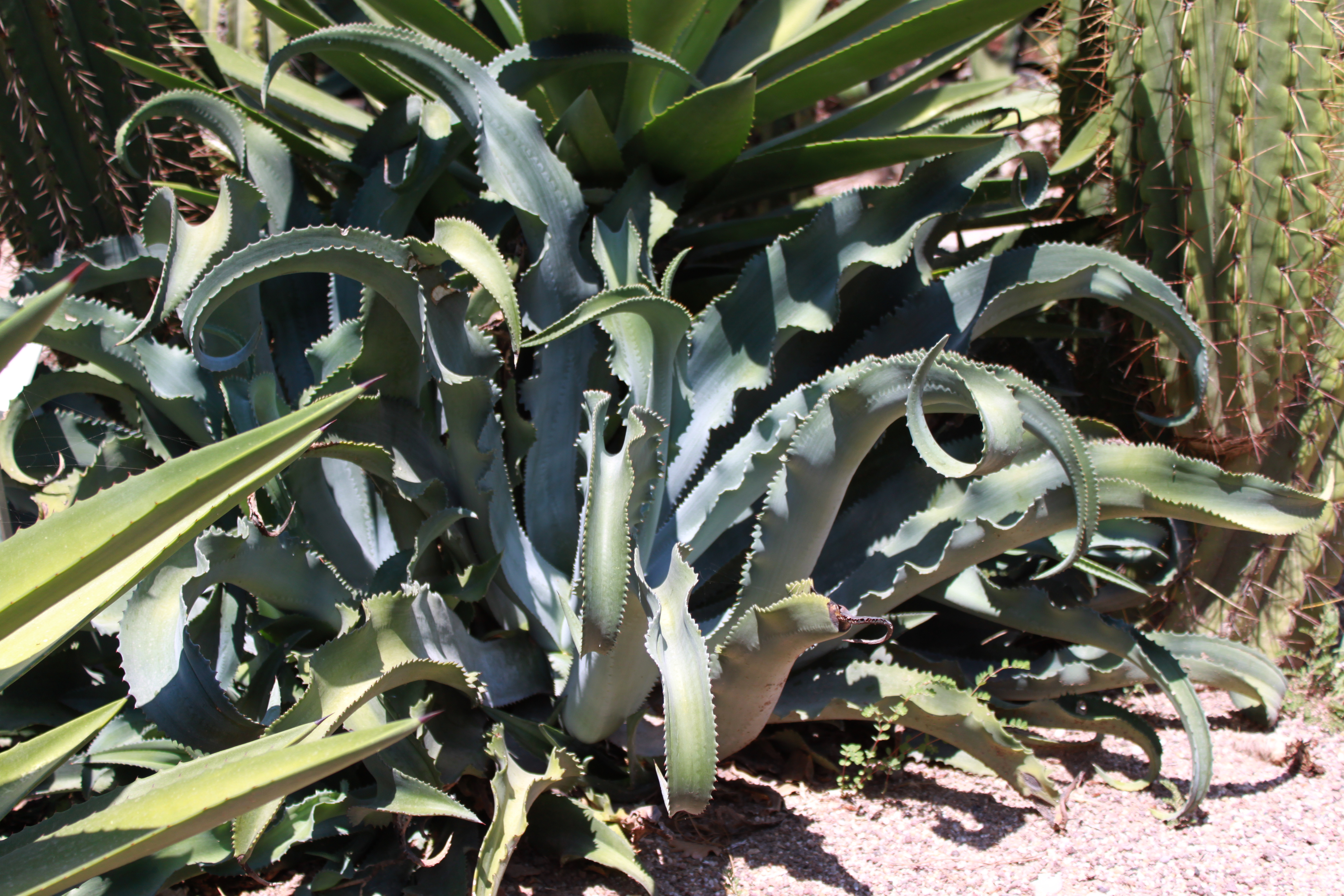

Conservation status
- Critically Endangered (IUCN 3.1)

Scientific classification
- Kingdom: Plantae
- Clade: Tracheophytes
- Clade: Angiosperms
- Clade: Monocots
- Order: Asparagales
- Family: Asparagaceae
- Subfamily: Agavoideae
- Genus: Agave
- Species: A. gypsophila

Binomial name
- Agave gypsophila Gentry,1982

= Agave gypsophila =

Species of flowering plant

Agave gypsophila (common names – gypsum century plant, blue wave agave) is a species of plant in the Asparagaceae family and is endemic to the Mexican state of Guerrero. The specific epithet, gypsophila, means gypsum loving.

Agave gypsophila was described by Howard Scott Gentry in 1982. In 2013, J. Antonio Vazquez-Garcıa, et al. proposed a narrower circumscription of Agave gypsophila based on both ecological and morphological characteristics. The Agave gypsophila sens. lat. (in the broad sense) of Howard Scott Gentry was divided into five species: Agave abisaii, A. andreae, A. gypsophila sens. strict. (in the strict sense), A. kristenii and A. pablocarrillioi. All five species are narrow range endemics in south west Mexico.

== Conservation ==
Agave gypsophila is listed as Critically Endangered by the IUCN. In the very restricted extent of occurrence, Agave gypsophila is locally abundant but threatened by a reduction in habitat quality and habitat destruction for agriculture and infrastructure. Agave gypsophila does not occur in any protected areas.

== In horticulture ==
The plants cultivated around the world as Agave gypsophila are considered to be mostly Agave pablocarrilloi. The photographs on this page are most probably images of Agave pablocarrilloi.

== Gallery ==
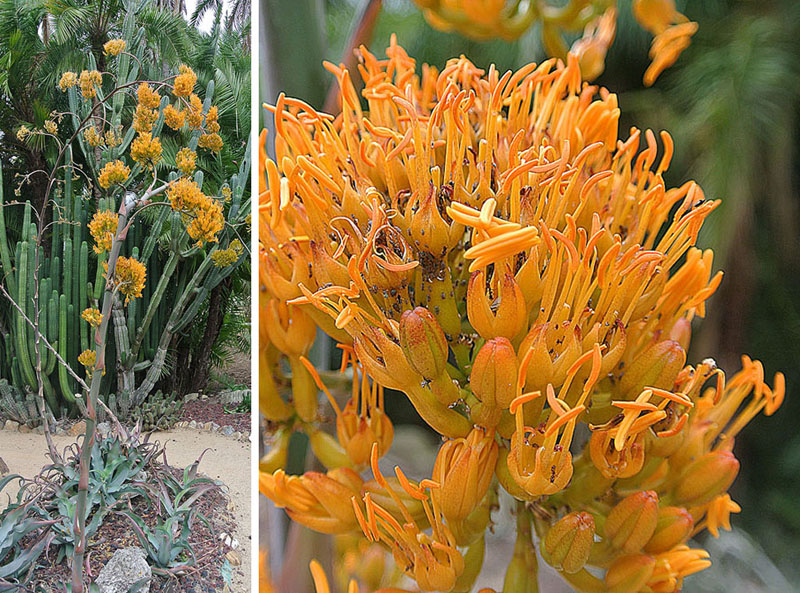
Habit and inflorescence

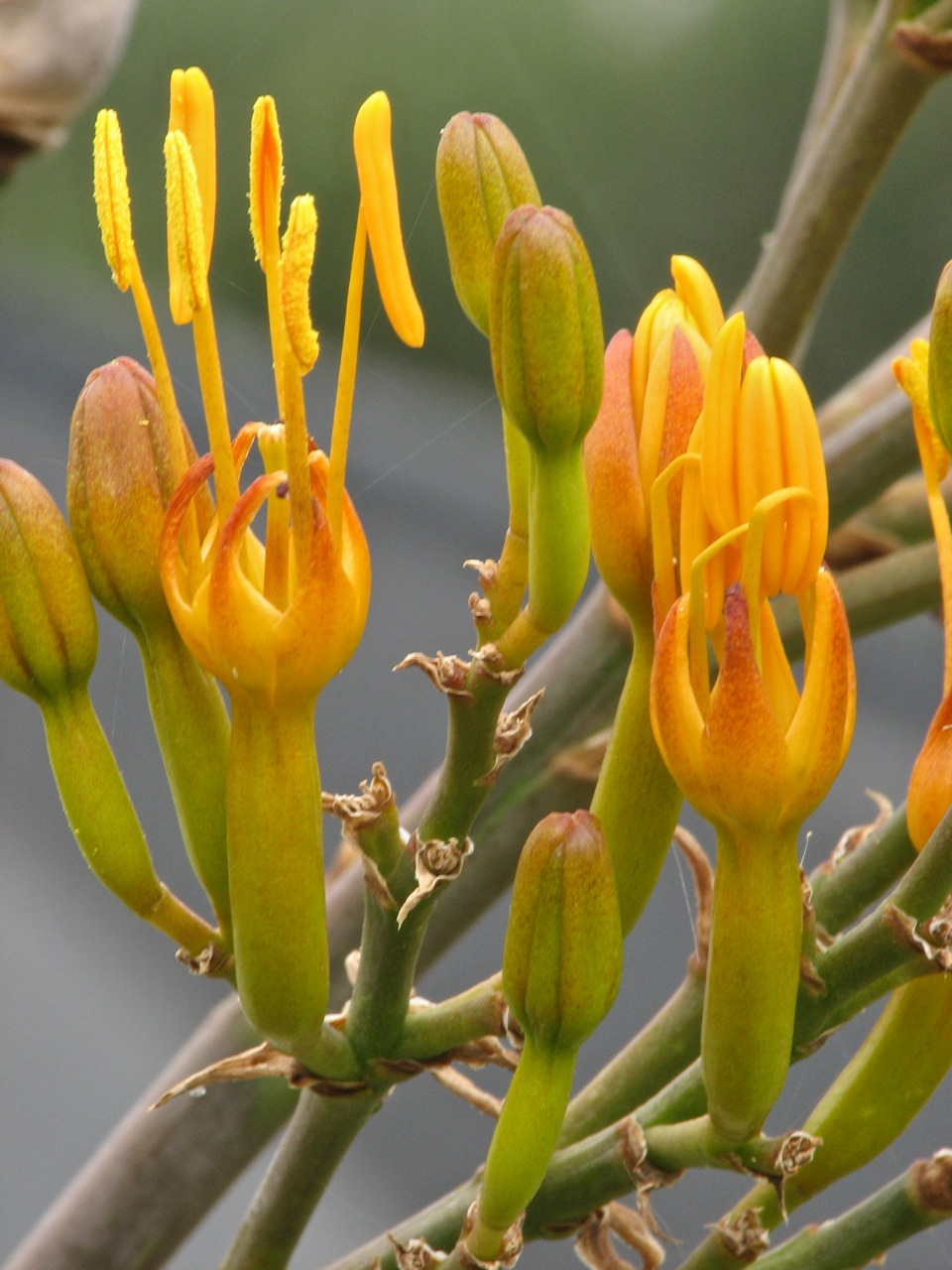
Inflorescence detail
