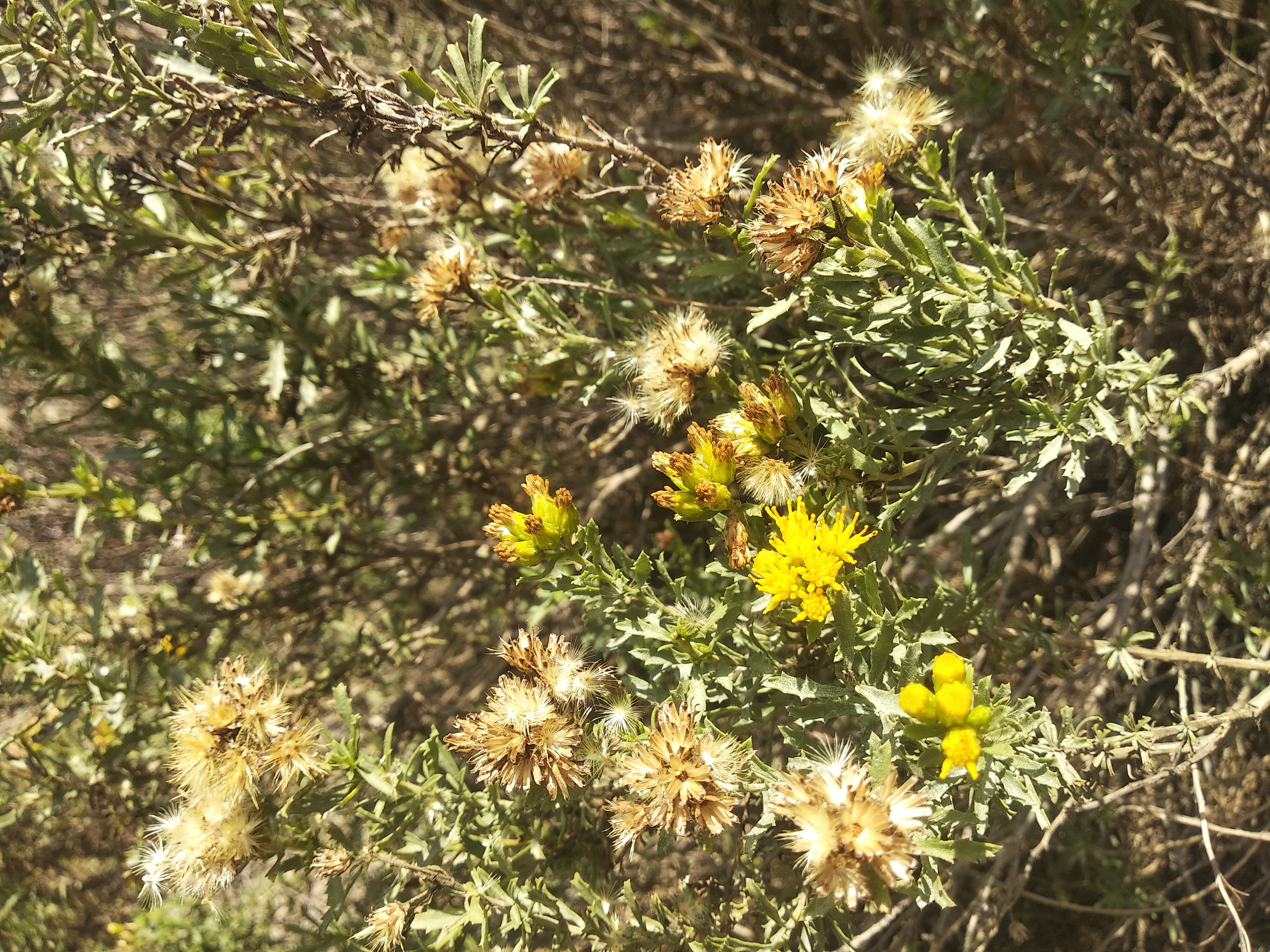

Scientific classification
- Kingdom: Plantae
- Clade: Tracheophytes
- Clade: Angiosperms
- Clade: Eudicots
- Clade: Asterids
- Order: Asterales
- Family: Asteraceae
- Genus: Isocoma
- Species: I. veneta

Binomial name
- Isocoma veneta (Kunth) Greene 1894

Synonyms
- Aplopappus discoideus DC.; Baccharis veneta Kunth 1818; Bigelowia veneta (Kunth) Gray; Bigelovia veneta (Kunth) Gray; Haplopappus discoideus DC.; Haplopappus venetus (Kunth) S. F. Blake; Aplopappus venetus (Kunth) S. F. Blake; Linosyris mexicana Schltdl.; Aster venetus Kuntze

= Isocoma veneta =

Species of flowering plant

Isocoma veneta (also known as false damiana) is a Mexican species of plants in the family Asteraceae. It is widespread across much of Mexico from Coahuila and Tamaulipas south as far as Oaxaca and Veracruz.

Isocoma veneta is a subshrub up to 70 centimetres (28 in) tall. It produces flower heads in clusters at the tips of branches, each head with 17–26 disc flowers but no ray flowers.
