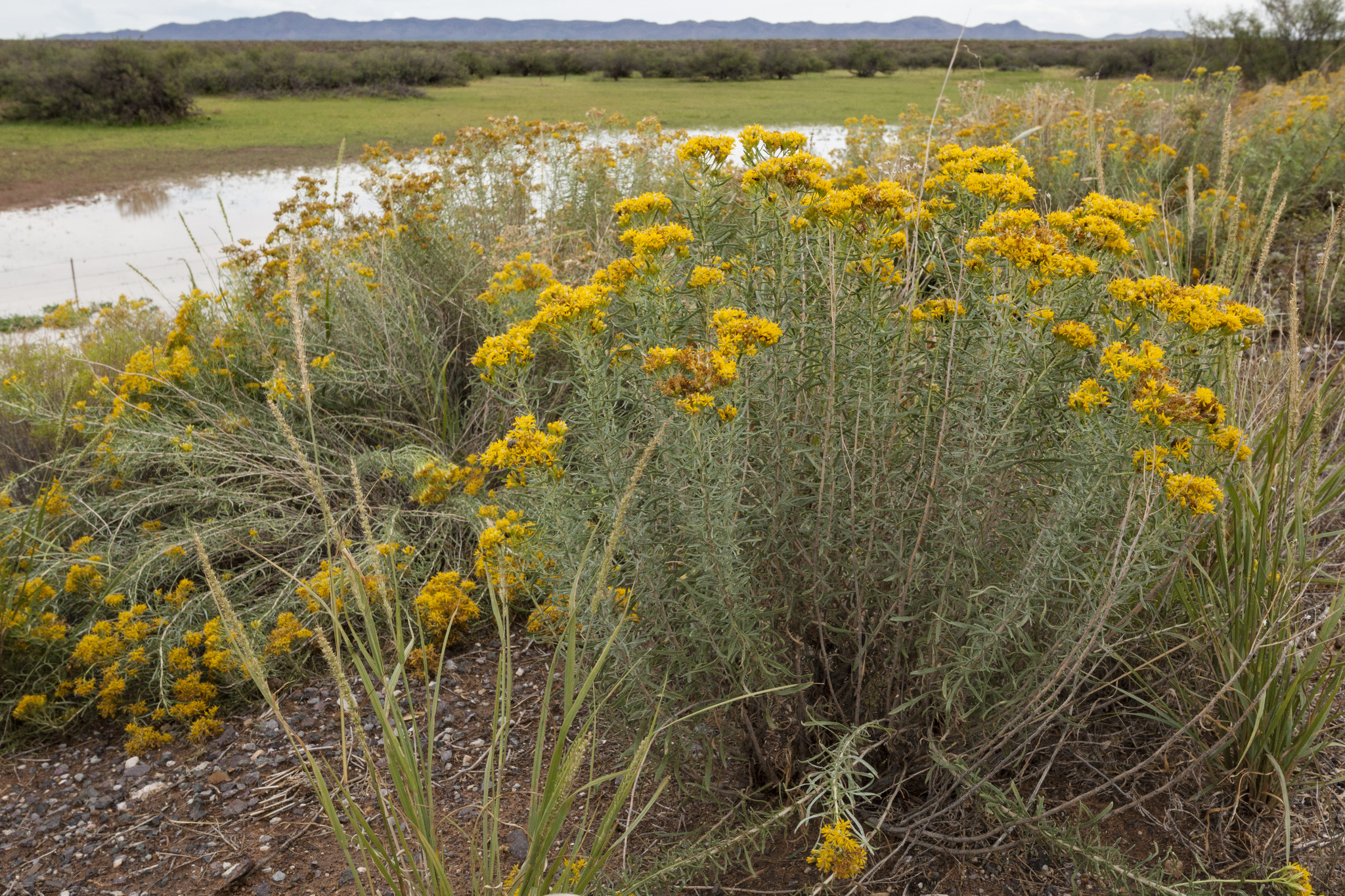
- In New Mexico

Scientific classification
- Kingdom: Plantae
- Clade: Tracheophytes
- Clade: Angiosperms
- Clade: Eudicots
- Clade: Asterids
- Order: Asterales
- Family: Asteraceae
- Genus: Isocoma
- Species: I. pluriflora

Binomial name
- Isocoma pluriflora (Torr. & A.Gray) Greene 1894

Synonyms
- Synonymy: Linosyris pluriflora Torr. & A.Gray 1842; Aster heterophyllus (A.Gray) Kuntze 1891 not Thunb. 1800; Bigelowia pluriflora (Torr. & A.Gray) A.Gray; Bigelowia wrightii (A.Gray) A.Gray; Bigelovia pluriflora (Torr. & A.Gray) A.Gray; Bigelovia wrightii (A.Gray) A.Gray; Chrysocoma graveolens Torr.; Haplopappus heterophyllus (A.Gray) S.F.Blake; Haplopappus pluriflorus (Torr. & A.Gray) H.M.Hall; Isocoma halophytica B.L.Turner; Isocoma heterophylla (A.Gray) Greene; Isocoma hirtella (A.Gray) A.Heller; Isocoma oxylepis Wooton & Standl.; Isocoma wrightii (A.Gray) Rydb.; Linosyris heterophylla A.Gray; Linosyris hirtella A.Gray; Linosyris wrightii A.Gray

= Isocoma pluriflora =

Species of flowering plant

Isocoma pluriflora, commonly called southern jimmyweed or southern goldenbush, is a North American species of flowering perennial herbs in the family Asteraceae. It grows in northern Mexico (Baja California Sur, Sonora, Chihuahua, Coahuila, Nuevo León) and in the southwestern and south-central United States (Arizona, New Mexico, Colorado and Texas).

Isocoma pluriflora grows 1–3.5 feet (0.30–1.07 m) tall. Leaves are narrow, up to 5 cm (2 inches) long. The plant produces numerous flower heads in a cluster at the top of the stem, each head with 8-21 yellow disc flowers but no ray flowers. The species is named "pluriflora", 'many flowered', for its up to 25-50 vertical and approximately parallel stalks, tipped with yellow golden flower heads.
