= Isocoma gypsophila =

Scientific classification
- Kingdom: Plantae
- Clade: Tracheophytes
- Clade: Angiosperms
- Clade: Eudicots
- Clade: Asterids
- Order: Asterales
- Family: Asteraceae
- Genus: Isocoma
- Species: I. gypsophila

Binomial name
- Isocoma gypsophila B.L.Turner 1972

Species of flowering plant

Isocoma gypsophila is a Mexican plant species in the family Asteraceae. It has been found in the States of Zacatecas and Nuevo León.

Isocoma gypsophila is a small perennial herb up to 10 cm (4 inches) tall, the stems mostly reclining on the ground and forming a mat. The plant produces one or two flower heads on the tips of branches, each head containing 30-40 disc flowers but no ray flowers.
