= Dayia =

Dayia may refer to:

- Dayia (plant), a genus of flowering plants in the family Polemoniaceae
- Dayia (brachiopod), a fossil genus of brachiopods in the family Dayiidae
