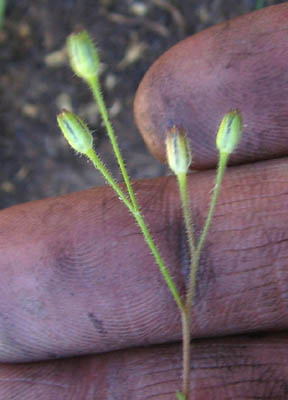

Scientific classification
- Kingdom: Plantae
- Clade: Tracheophytes
- Clade: Angiosperms
- Clade: Eudicots
- Clade: Asterids
- Order: Ericales
- Family: Polemoniaceae
- Genus: Saltugilia
- Species: S. australis

Binomial name
- Saltugilia australis (H. Mason & A.D. Grant) L.A. Johnson

Synonyms
- Gilia australis

= Saltugilia australis =

Species of flowering plant

Saltugilia australis (syn. Gilia australis) is a species of flowering plant in the phlox family known by the common name southern gilia.

It is endemic to southern California, where it grows in sandy habitat in the Transverse Ranges, Peninsular Ranges, and Mojave Desert mountains.

== Description ==
Saltugilia australis is an herb that produces a very thin, erect stem up to 45 centimetres (18 in) tall, surrounded at the base by a rosette of leaves with blades divided into lobed segments.

The glandular inflorescence produces tiny flowers with green sepals sometimes dotted with purple and ribbed with membranous tissue between the ribs. The corolla is up to 1 centimetre (0.39 in) long and white to lavender in color with yellow in the throat.
