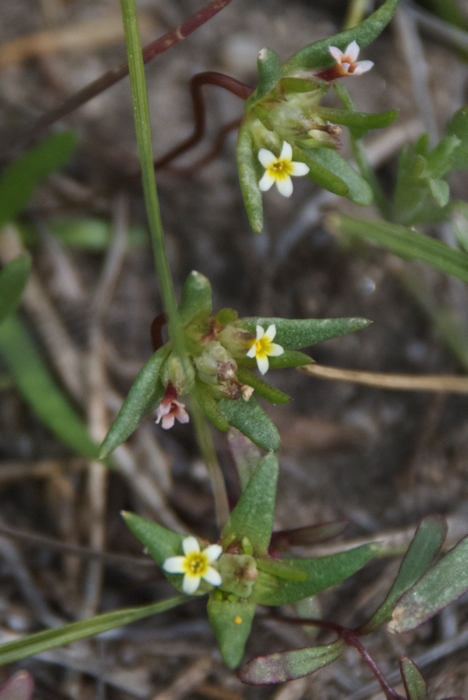

Conservation status
- Apparently Secure (NatureServe)

Scientific classification
- Kingdom: Plantae
- Clade: Embryophytes
- Clade: Tracheophytes
- Clade: Spermatophytes
- Clade: Angiosperms
- Clade: Eudicots
- Clade: Asterids
- Order: Ericales
- Family: Polemoniaceae
- Genus: Gymnosteris
- Species: G. parvula

Binomial name
- Gymnosteris parvula A.Heller

Synonyms
- Gilia parvula; Gymnosteris leibergii; Gymnosteris rydbergii

= Gymnosteris parvula =

Plant species in the phlox family

Gymnosteris parvula is a flowering plant in the phlox family known by the common name smallflower gymnosteris. It is native to the western United States from California to Montana. This is a small annual herb growing a thin green to red-colored stem only a few centimeters tall. There are no leaves; the word gymnosteris comes from the Greek for "naked stem". Atop the stem is a large, fleshy inflorescence with red-tinged green bracts that serve as leaves. Within the lobular inflorescence are one to five small flowers, each less than a centimeter long. The yellow-throated flower has yellow or white oval-shaped lobes with pointed tips. It is self-pollinating.

== Taxonomy ==
Gymnosteris parvula was scientifically described and named in 1900 by Amos Arthur Heller. It is part of the Gymnosteris genus which is classified in the Polemoniaceae family. The species has five synonyms.

Table of Synonyms
Name	Year	Rank	Notes
Gilia parvula Rydb.	1900	species	≡ hom.
Gymnosteris leibergii Brand	1921	species	= het.
Gymnosteris nudicaulis var. parvula (A.Heller) Jeps.	1925	variety	≡ hom.
Gymnosteris parvula f. leibergii (Brand) Wherry	1944	form	= het.
Gymnosteris rydbergii Tidestr.	1925	species	≡ hom., nom. illeg.
Notes: ≡ homotypic synonym; = heterotypic synonym
