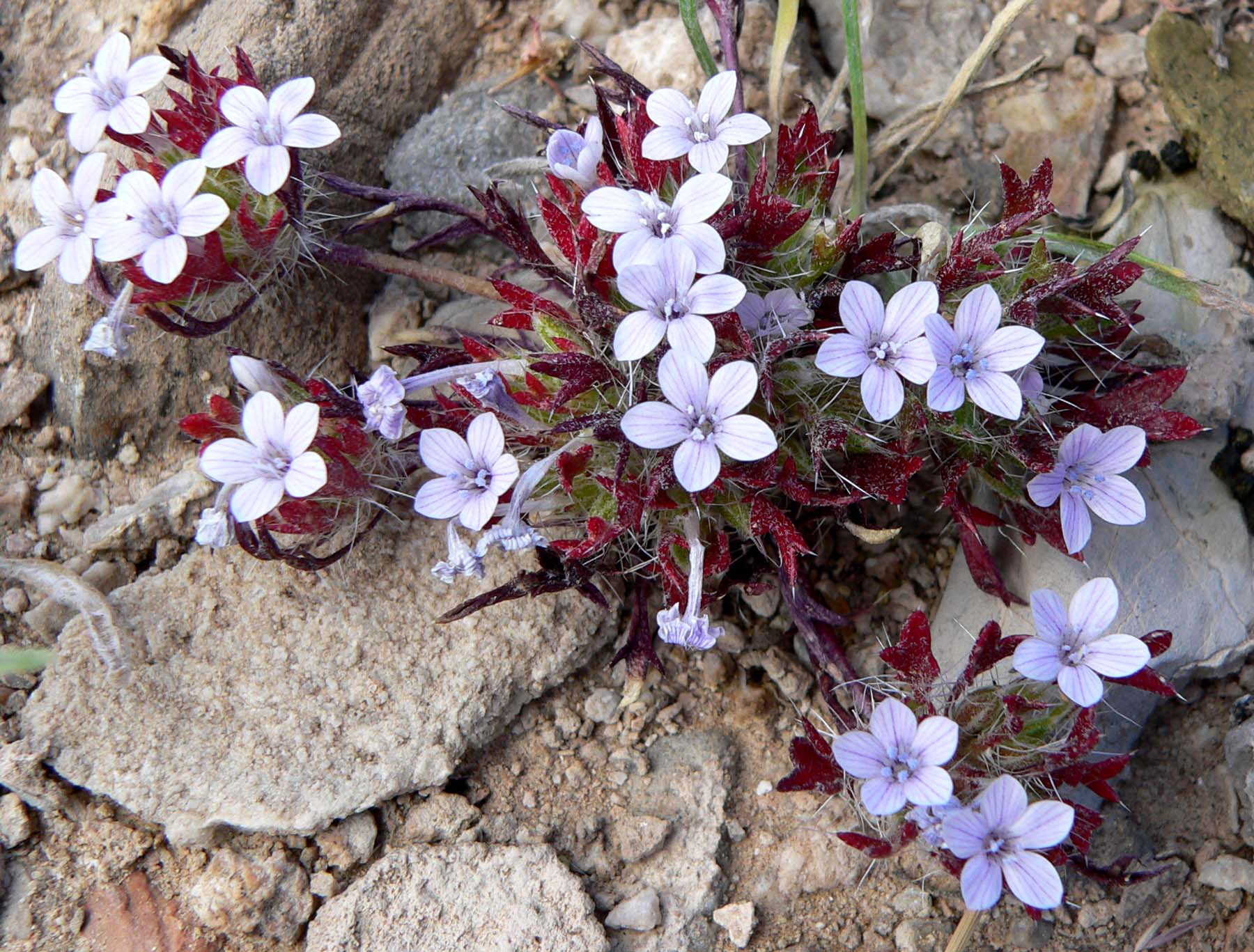

Scientific classification
- Kingdom: Plantae
- Clade: Tracheophytes
- Clade: Angiosperms
- Clade: Eudicots
- Clade: Asterids
- Order: Ericales
- Family: Polemoniaceae
- Genus: Langloisia; Greene
- Species: L. setosissima

Binomial name
- Langloisia setosissima (Torr. & A.Gray) Greene

Synonyms
- Gilia setosissima (Torr.) A.Gray; Navarretia setosissima Torr.

= Langloisia =

Genus of flowering plants

Langloisia is a genus of flowering plants in the family Polemoniaceae. It is monotypic, being represented by the single species Langloisia setosissima, also known as bristly langloisia, bristly-calico, Great Basin langloisia, and lilac sunbonnets. It is native to the western United States and north-western Mexico, where it is found in desert washes and on rocky slopes and plains from eastern Oregon and Idaho, south via Nevada and Utah to eastern California and Arizona.

The genus name of Langloisia is in honour of Auguste Berthélemy Langlois (1832–1900), who was a French-born American clergyman and botanist.

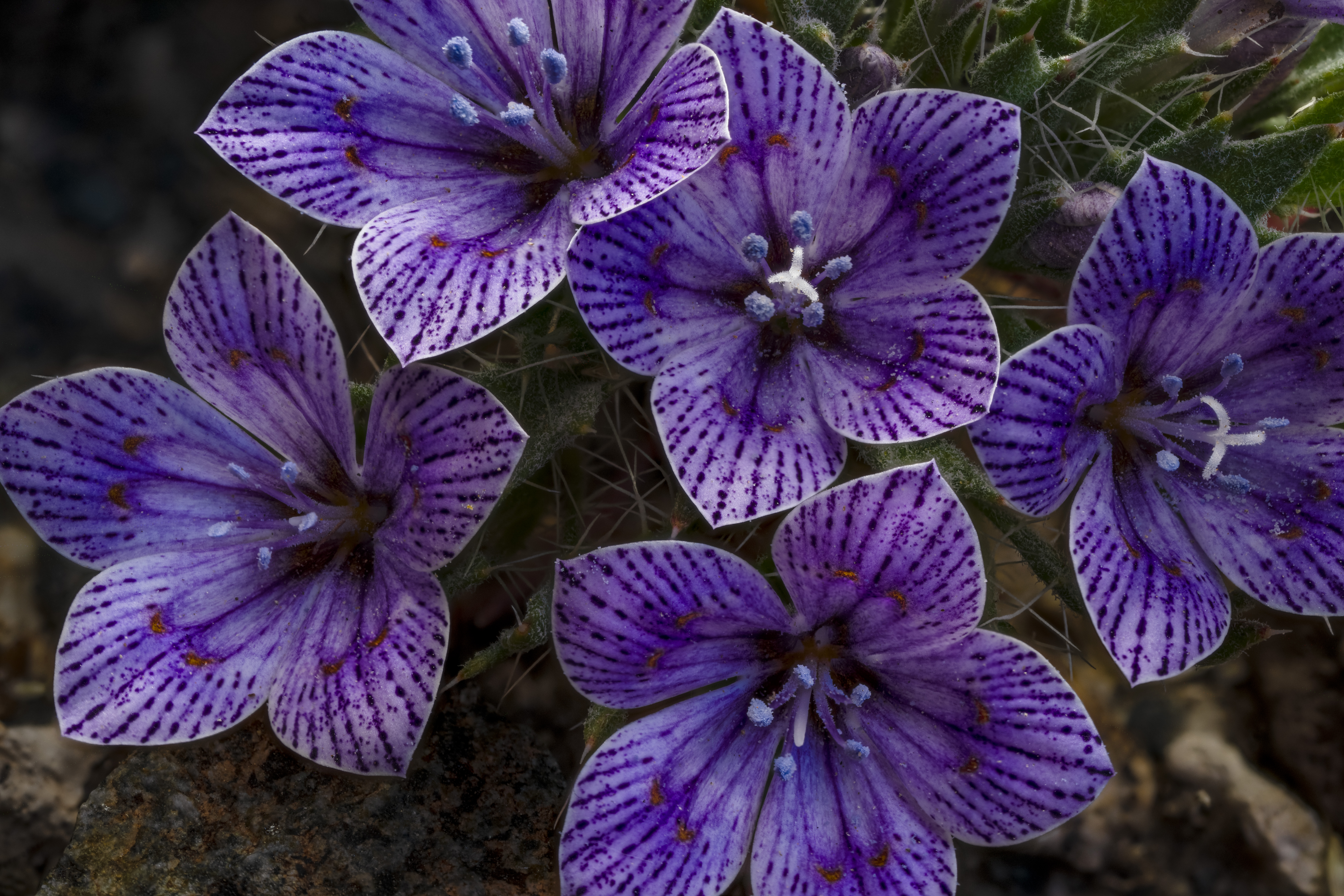
Langloisia setosissima subsp. punctata

It is an annual plant, growing to 4–20 cm tall. The leaves are spirally arranged, linear, 2–3 cm long, densely bristly and with a toothed margin. The flowers are white to light blue or pale purple in color, 1.5–2 cm diameter, with a deeply five-lobed corolla.

There are two subspecies:

- Langloisia setosissima subsp. setosissima. Flowers with a uniformly colored corolla, possibly showing faint patterns of dots and stripes.
- Langloisia setosissima subsp. punctata (syn. Langloisia lanata, Langloisia punctata). Flowers with a corolla spotted with darker purple and yellow.

The genus Loeseliastrum was previously included in Langloisia, formed from two former Langloisia species:

- Loeseliastrum matthewsii, formerly Langloisia matthewsii
- Loeseliastrum schottii, formerly Langloisia schottii

== Other sources ==
- Jepson Flora Project: Langloisia setosissima
- CalFlora: Langloisia setosissima (requires login)
- Photos of subsp. setosissima and subsp. punctata
- USDA Plants Profile
- Mojave Desert Wildflowers, Jon Mark Stewart, 1998, pg. 147
