= California Botanic Garden =

Botanical garden in Claremont, California

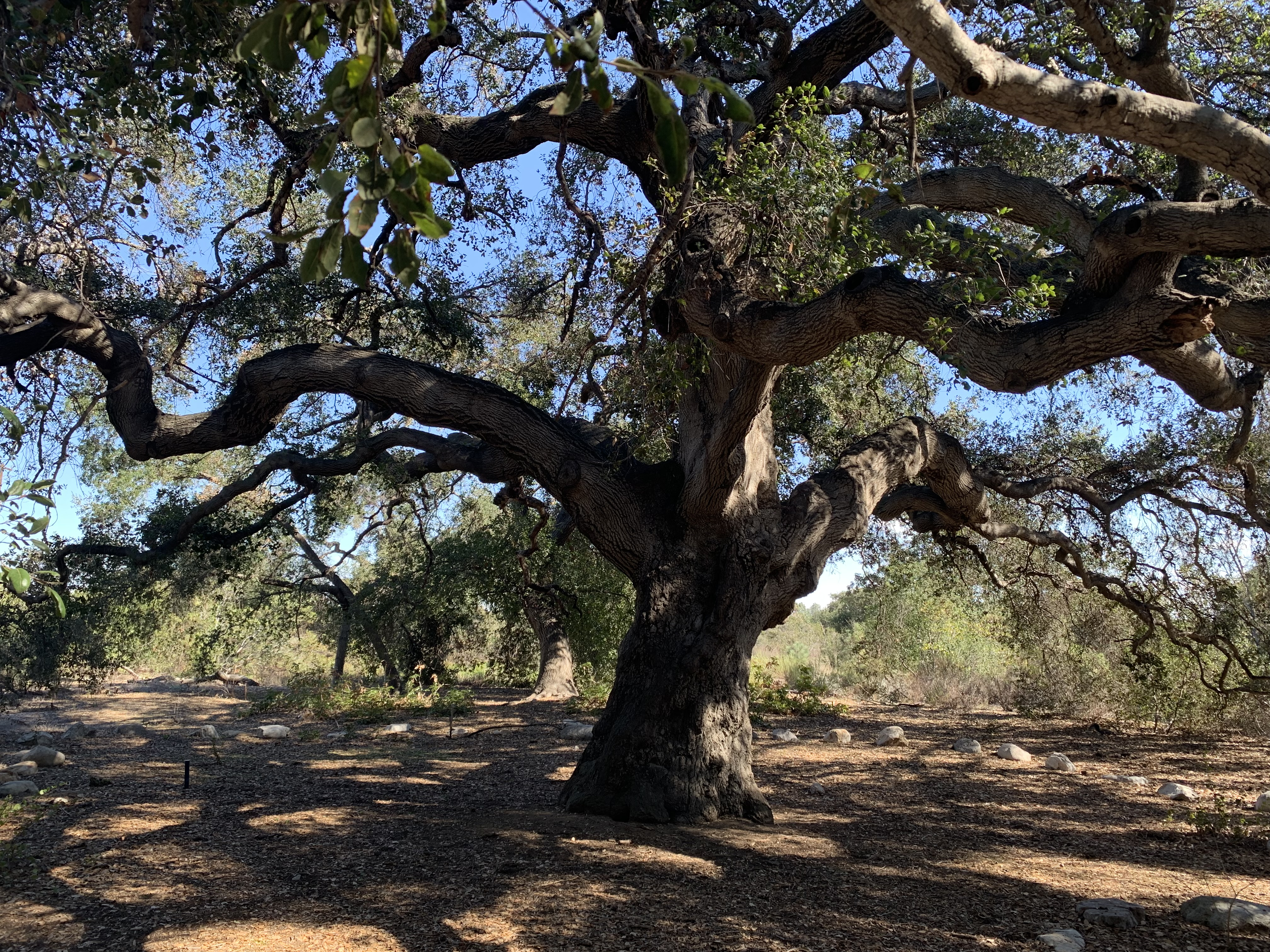
- California Botanic Garden's Majestic Oak (Quercus agrifolia) which is around 250 years old.

- Location within the Los Angeles metropolitan area Location within California
- Type: Botanical garden
- Location: Claremont, California
- Nearest city: Claremont, California
- Coordinates: 34°06′57″N 117°42′59″W
- Area: 86 acres (35 ha)
- Created: 1927 (Santa Ana), 1951 (Claremont)
- Open: 8 am-5 pm to 8 am-8 pm depending on the time of year
- Status: Open year-round
- Website: Official website

The California Botanic Garden (formerly the Rancho Santa Ana Botanic Garden) is a non-profit botanical garden in Claremont, California, in the United States, just south of the San Gabriel foothills. At 86 acres (35 ha), it is the largest botanic garden in the state dedicated to California native plants. It contains some 70,000 native Californian plants, representing 2,000 native species, hybrids and cultivars. The seed bank has embryos for the thousands of rare plants.

The garden has an active research department, specializing in systematic botany and floristics. The journal Aliso is published by the organization semiannually. The garden offers graduate degrees in botany through Claremont Graduate University.

== History ==
California Botanic Garden’s creation was conceptualized by Susanna Bixby Bryant to bring attention to the importance of California native plants. The garden was established in 1927 in Orange County and was dedicated in memory of Bryant’s father, John W. Bixby. It was the second botanic garden in California dedicated to native plants, as Santa Barbara Botanic Garden was established the year prior. She dedicated 200 acres (81 ha) of her 6,000-acre Santa Ana Canyon ranch property (2,400 ha) to be converted into Rancho Santa Ana Botanic Garden and became its managing director.

She consulted and collaborated with Willis Linn Jepson, author of the Manual of the Flowering Plants of California, and Ernest Braunton, a prominent landscape architect, to coordinate the garden layout and determine where plants would be grown. The herbarium was also established at the garden’s inception and continues to grow. Edward Howard, the first nurseryman at the garden, set the precedent for the botanic garden to obtain seeds from wild populations to grow native plants instead of buying plants. Theodore Payne collected seeds and herbarium specimens for the garden and helped direct plantings. John Thomas Howell, a master’s student of Jepson, oversaw collecting herbarium specimens and plants for the living collection as the resident botanist of the garden for the summer of 1927. The position was then given to Carl Brandt Wolf, who held the position of resident botanist from 1930 to 1945. Following Wolf’s departure, Philip Alexander Munz, a botany professor at Pomona College, was appointed as the next resident botanist of the Garden and the first scientific director.

The 1940s and 1950s were marked by a set of changes. In 1943, a fire burned and consumed a third of the garden, and the next year brought heavy rainstorms, which damaged the garden further through erosion and landslides; in total, around 5,300 plants were lost. In 1946, Susana Bixby Bryant passed away suddenly, which jeopardized the future of the garden. After her passing, Philip Munz was made the new managing director and made several key changes. In 1947, Munz initiated the official scientific journal of the botanic garden named Aliso, formerly El Aliso, and named it such due to the historical importance of the sycamore. The journal was the combination of two previous publications: Rancho Santa Ana Botanic Garden Monographs, Horticultural Series and Botanical Series. Concerns grew regarding the garden’s remoteness from places of higher education and possible tensions with the heirs of Mrs. Bryant’s land.

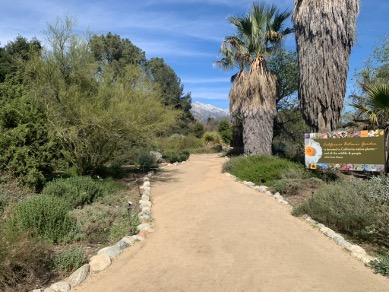
California Botanic Garden entrance pathway.

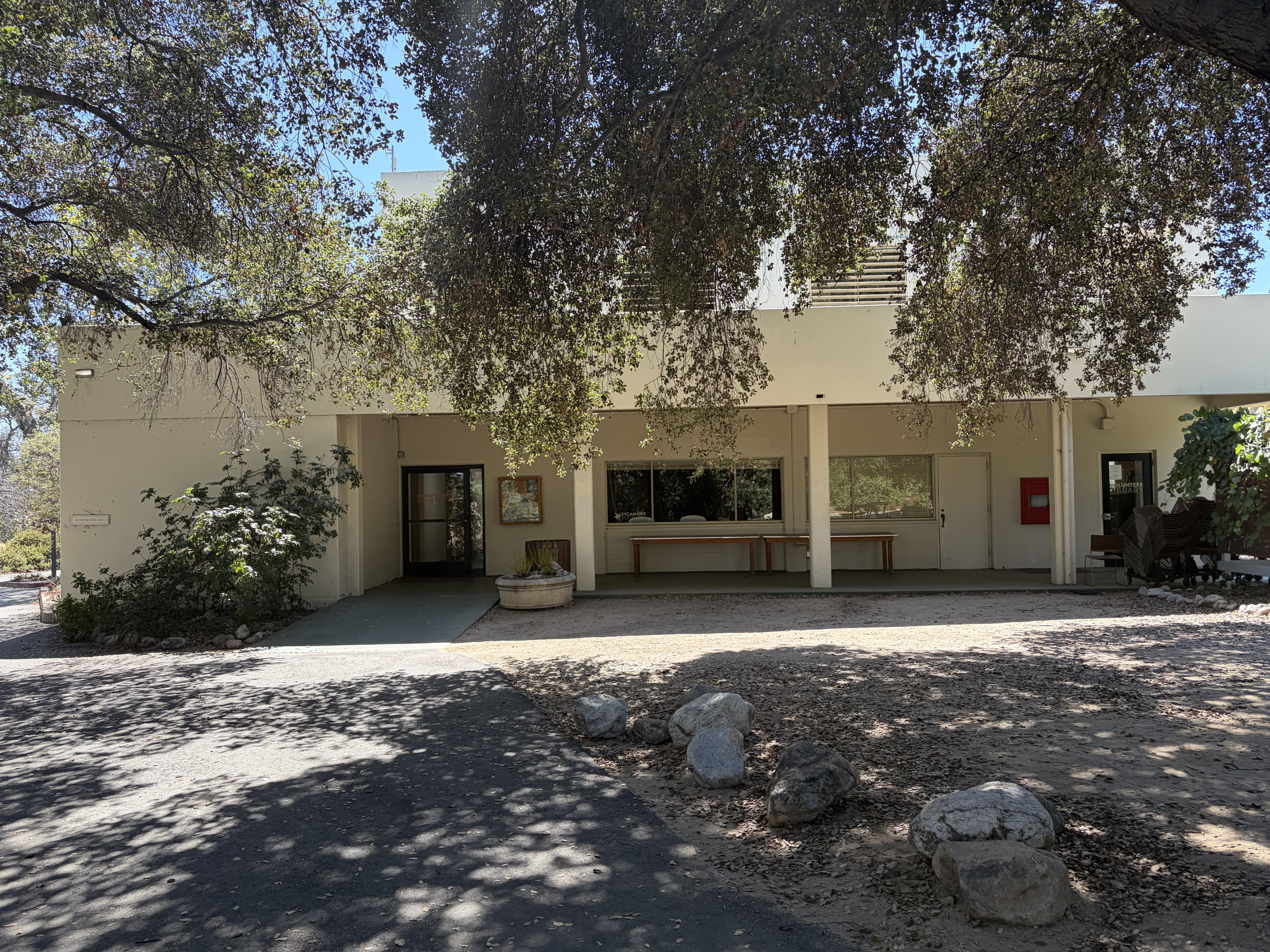
California Botanic Garden Administration Building

Munz suggested the garden’s relocation to the Claremont Colleges, with the botanic garden's primary affiliation being Claremont Graduate University, as the home of the garden's Botany department; this had the effect of increasing the garden's accessibility, promoting graduate level research at the garden, and encouraging the growth of new kinds of native plants. Plans for the relocation were finalized in 1950, and planting operations for the new location began in 1951. That year, over 10,000 plants and 25,000 bulbs were planted throughout the new space. After the move, access to the garden became more open to the public.

At the time of the acquisition of the Claremont land, the area was mostly covered with sagebrush with species such as white sage (Salvia apiana), black sage (Salvia mellifera), California sagebrush (Artemisia californica), toyon (Heteromeles arbutifolia), laurel sumac (Malosma laurina), lemonade-berry (Rhus integrifolia), and California coffee-berry (Frangula californica), all of which are currently found in the garden. A stand of California coast live oaks (Quercus agrifolia) on the eastern side of the mesa, and western sycamores (Platanus racemosa) continue to persist from before the garden’s relocation.

In 1975, the garden began to include plants from northern Baja California, following the boundary of the California floristic province rather than the state, as many plants in the state of California have their southern range limit in northern Baja California. This change allowed the garden to have representatives from the entire geographical range of species extending beyond the California border.

The original layout of the garden post relocation was aligned with the floristic regions of California in a north-to-south orientation following the layout of these regions across the state. As it turned out, the northern part of the garden is hotter while the southern part is shadier, the inverse of the requirements needed for the plants of each region. Since that initial planting, the garden continues to relocate its plants to better match each plant's growing conditions.

The garden is a member of the Center for Plant Conservation, a consortium of North American institutions working to preserve native plant species. It is also an accredited member of the American Public Gardens Association and is the second botanic garden to be accredited by the American Alliance of Museums.

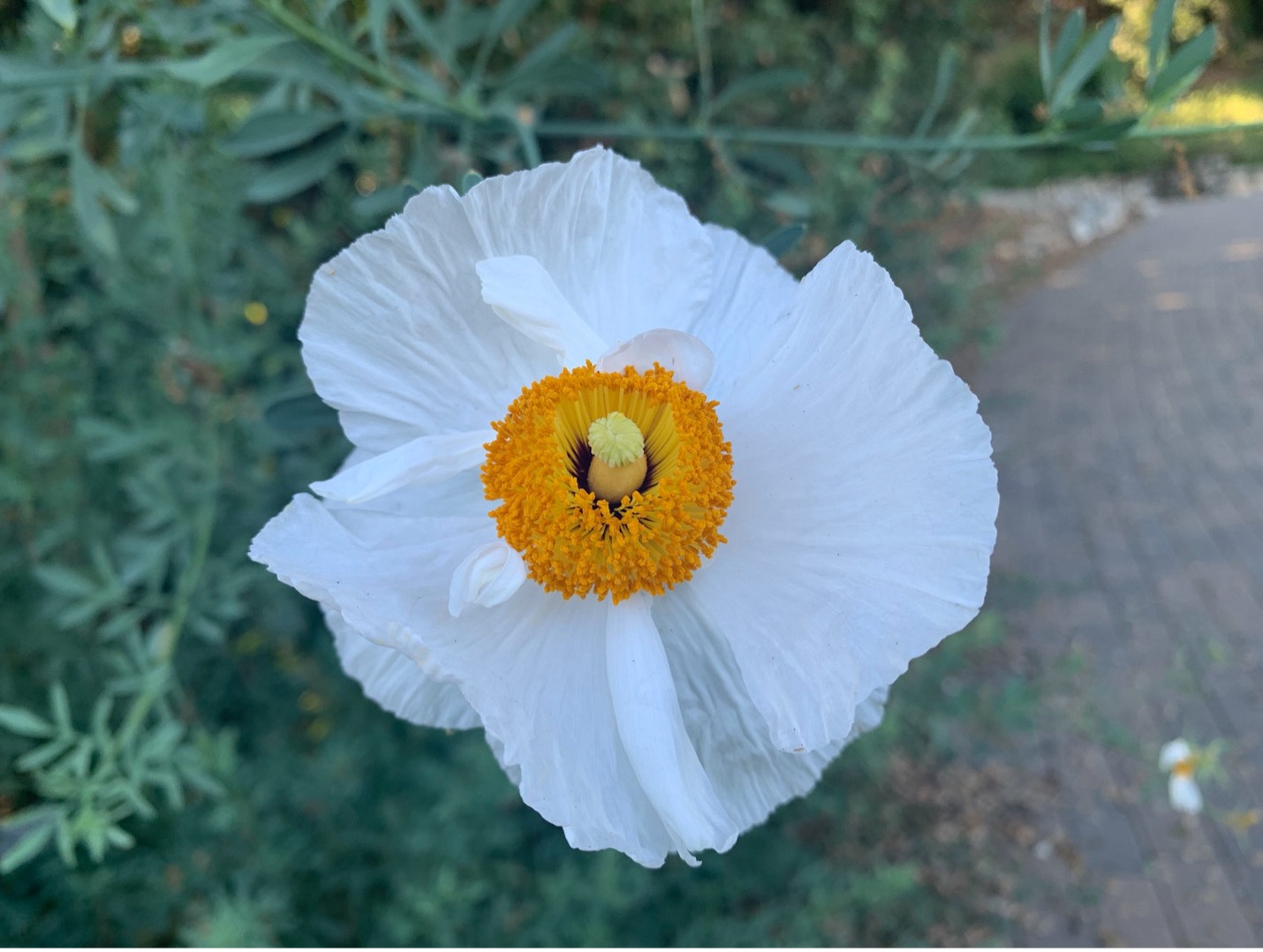
Matilija Poppy (Romneya coulteri) flower, largest flower in California, in the southern California gardens.

In 2020, the Rancho Santa Ana Botanic Garden became known as California Botanic Garden to emphasize the garden’s purpose and dedication to California native plants. The name change prompted the logo to change from a sycamore leaf (Platanus racemosa) to a Matilija poppy flower (Romneya coulteri), the largest native California flower.

== Herbarium ==
The California Botanic Garden hosts the third-largest herbarium in the state (10th largest in the US), which is home to over 1,200,000 specimens. The herbarium is a combination of the Rancho Santa Ana Botanic Garden and Pomona College herbaria (RSA-POM). It hosts the largest collection of Southern California plants in the world, totaling over 250,000 specimens. Most of the collection, around 95%, is composed of pressed vascular plants mounted on sheets. The ancillary collections of the herbarium consist of cone and fruit collections, wood collection, fluid-preserved collections, and pollen and anatomy slide collection. The herbarium also has a modest bryophyte collection. The RSA-POM herbarium is an active member of the Consortium of California Herbaria.

The herbaria of Pomona College (POM) and Rancho Santa Ana Botanic Garden (RSA) have long been in association, being housed together since the Garden’s relocation in 1951 and fully integrated in the late 1960s. Management of the separate collections was consolidated in the mid-1970s, but they were under separate ownership until the 1st of June 1996, when formal ownership of the Pomona College Herbarium was transferred to California Botanic Garden. The specimens acquired from Pomona College kept their POM accession identification for historic continuity. Since then, all new collections to the Garden have been accessioned under RSA. After the name change to California Botanic Garden, the herbarium still retains its RSA accession identification for historical continuity.

The Garden also houses herbarium collections from various other institutions, such as the Natural History Museum of Los Angeles County, the University of Southern California, and the Alan Hancock Foundation, which have changed accession identity to be under RSA or POM.

== California Botanic Garden gallery ==
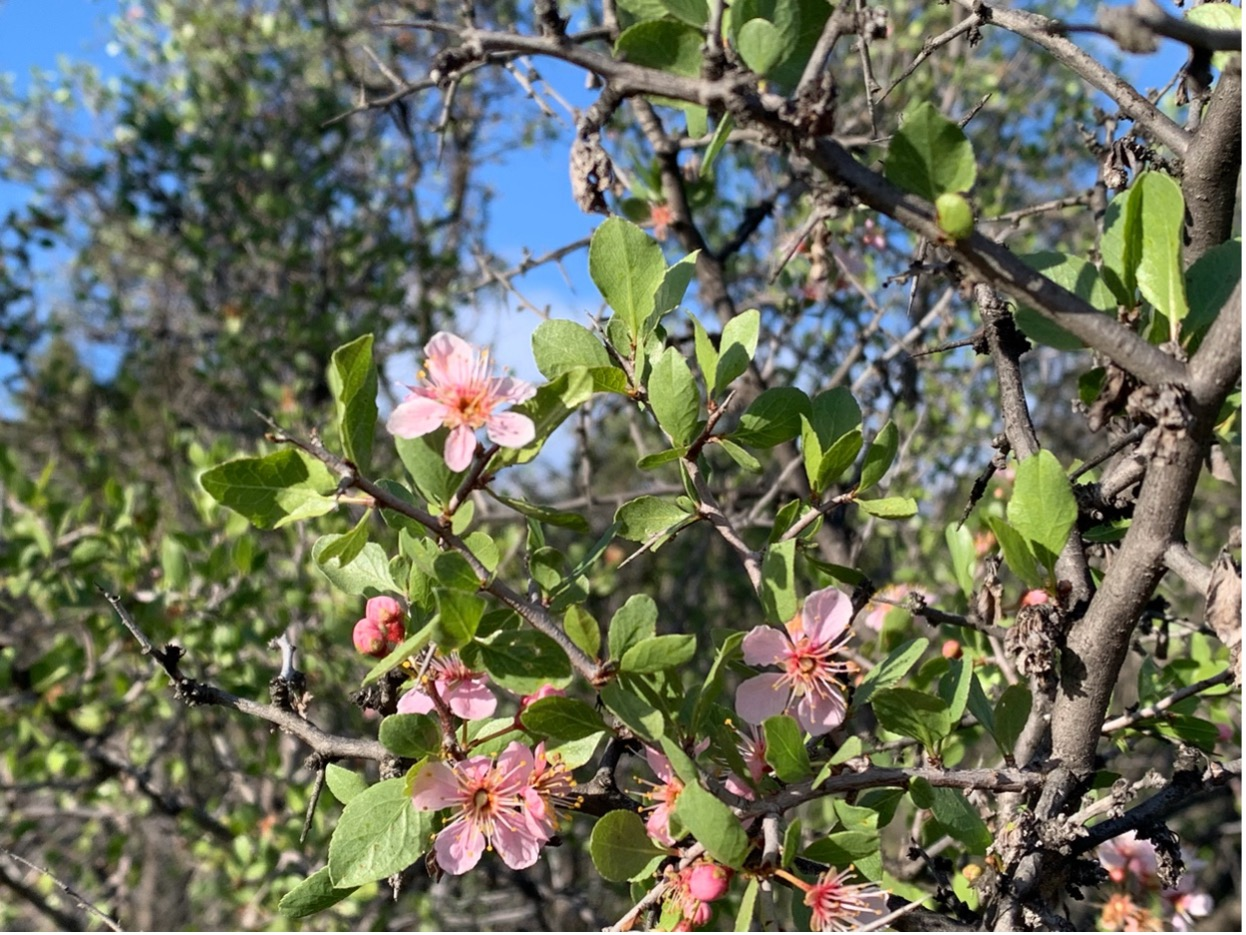
Desert peach (Prunus andersonii) in the California community gardens.

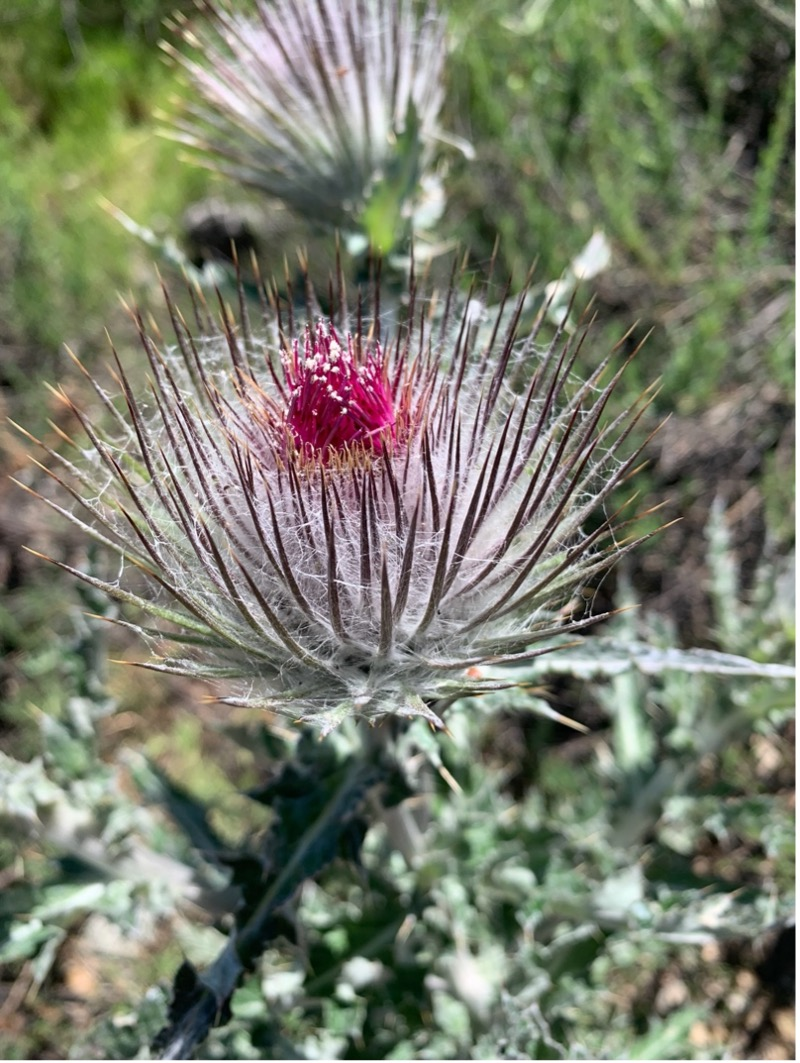
Cobweb thistle (Cirsium occidentale) flower in the California community gardens.

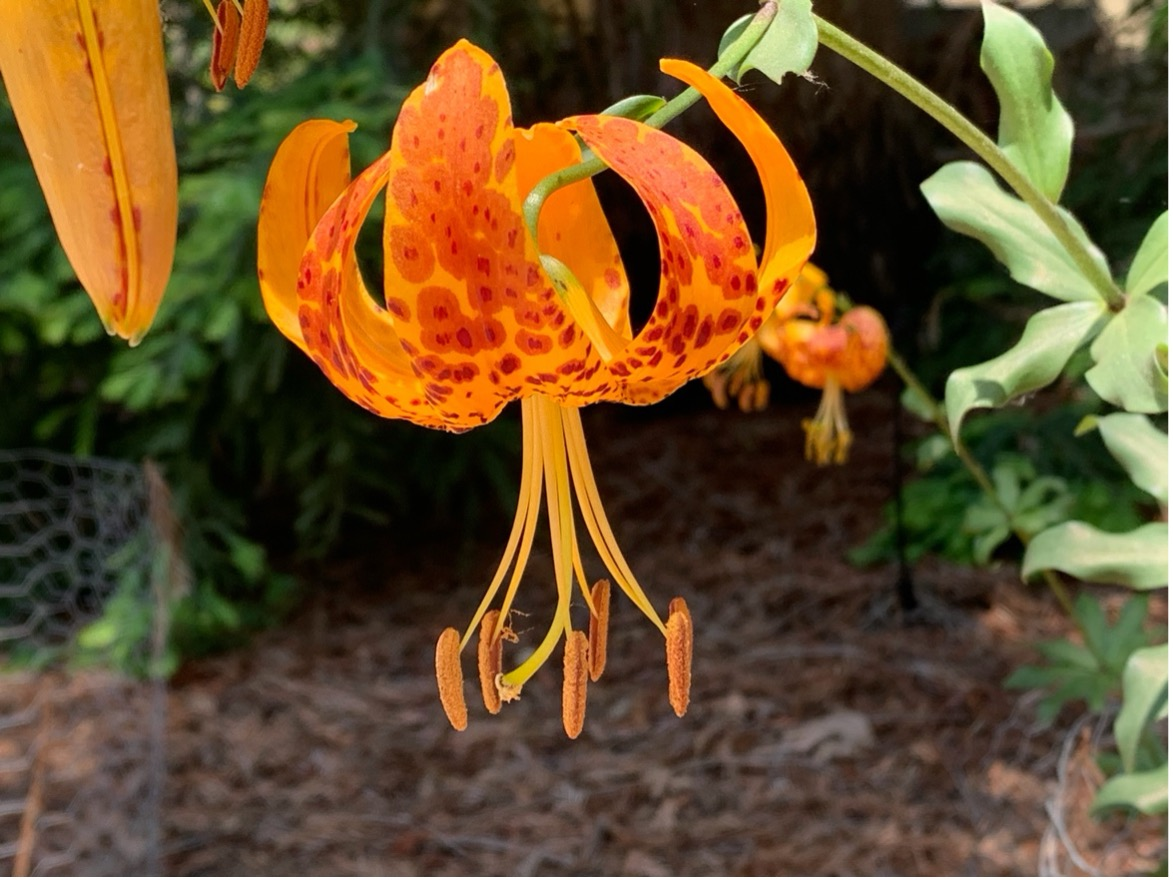
Humboldt's Lily (Lilium humboldtii) flower in the mesa gardens.

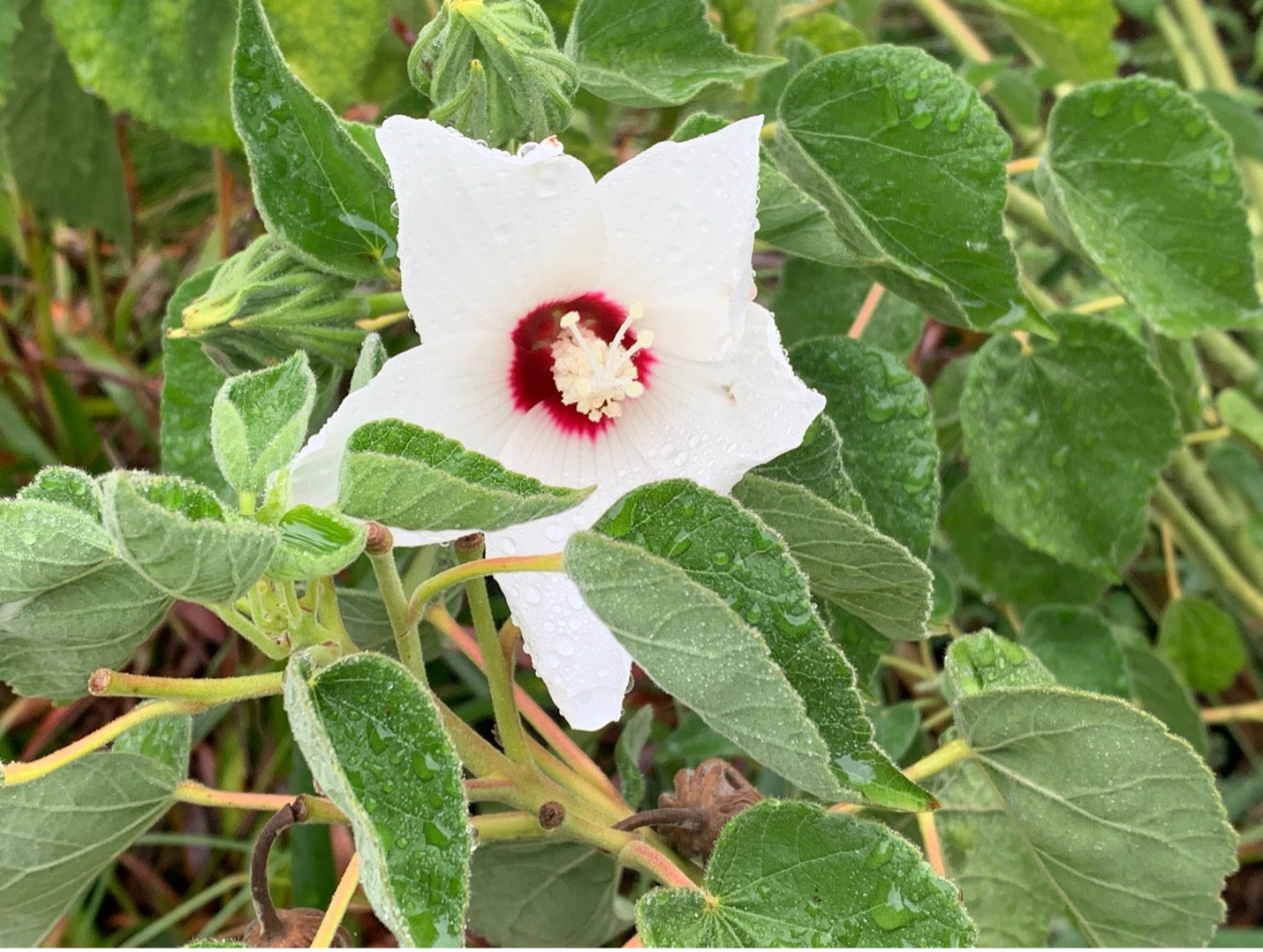
Rose Mallow (Hibiscus lasiocarpos var. occidentalis) flower, second largest flower in California, near the reflecting pond.

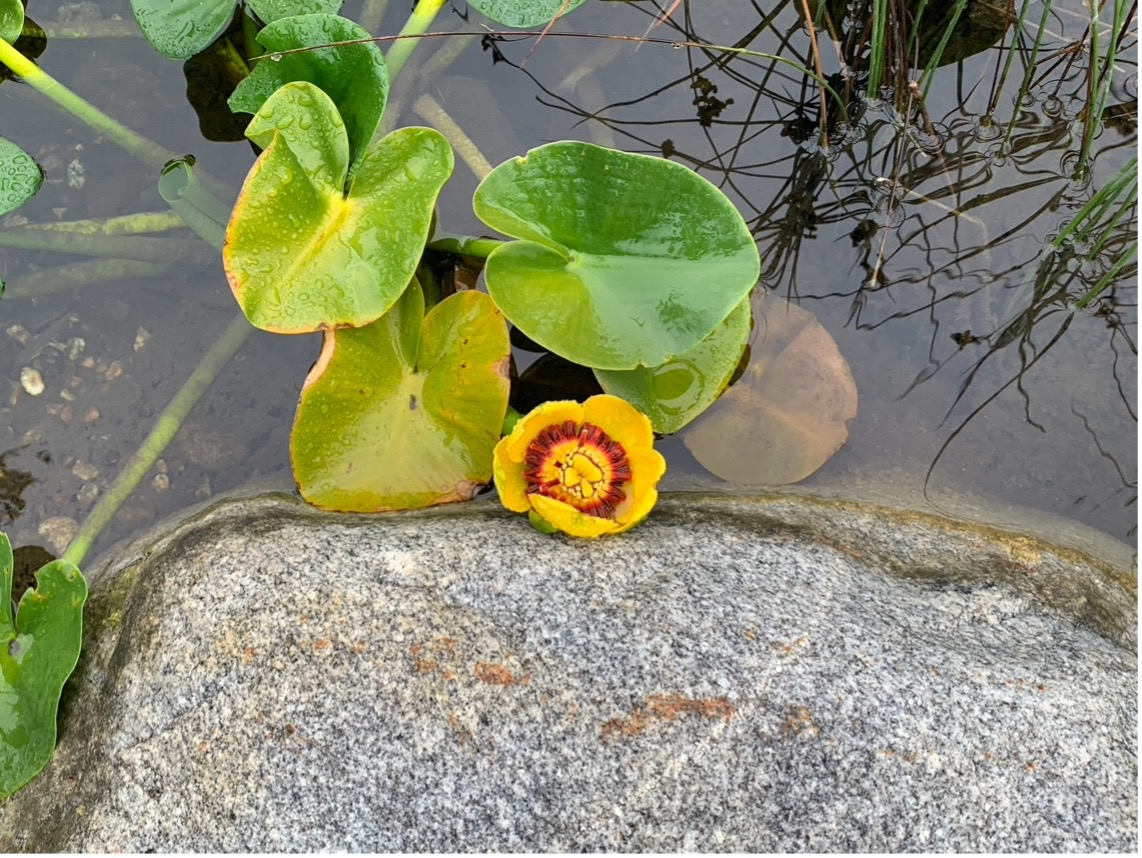
Great Yellow Pond-lily (Nuphar polysepala) in the reflecting pond.

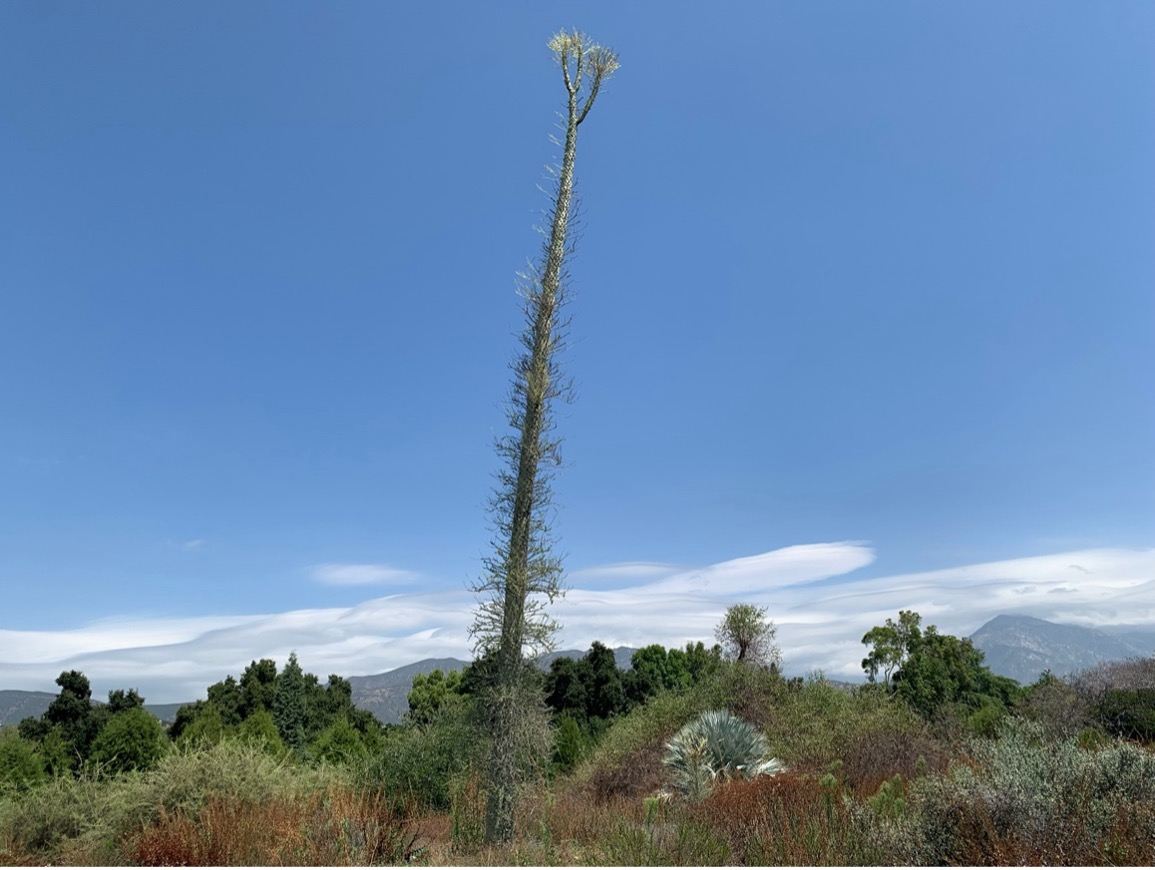
Boojum tree (Fouquieria columnaris) in the California community gardens.

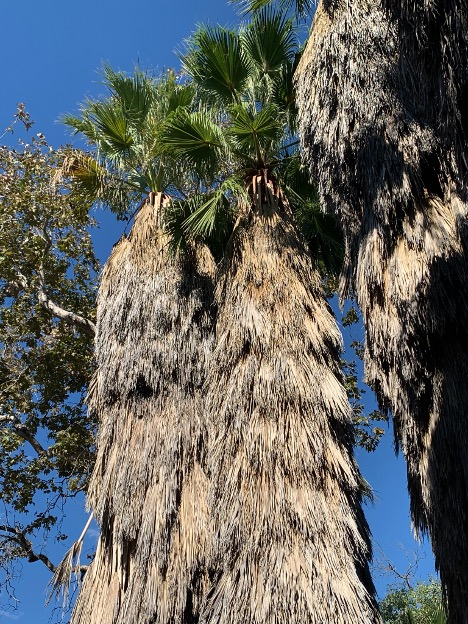
California Fan Palms (Washingtonia filifera) in the fan palm oasis.

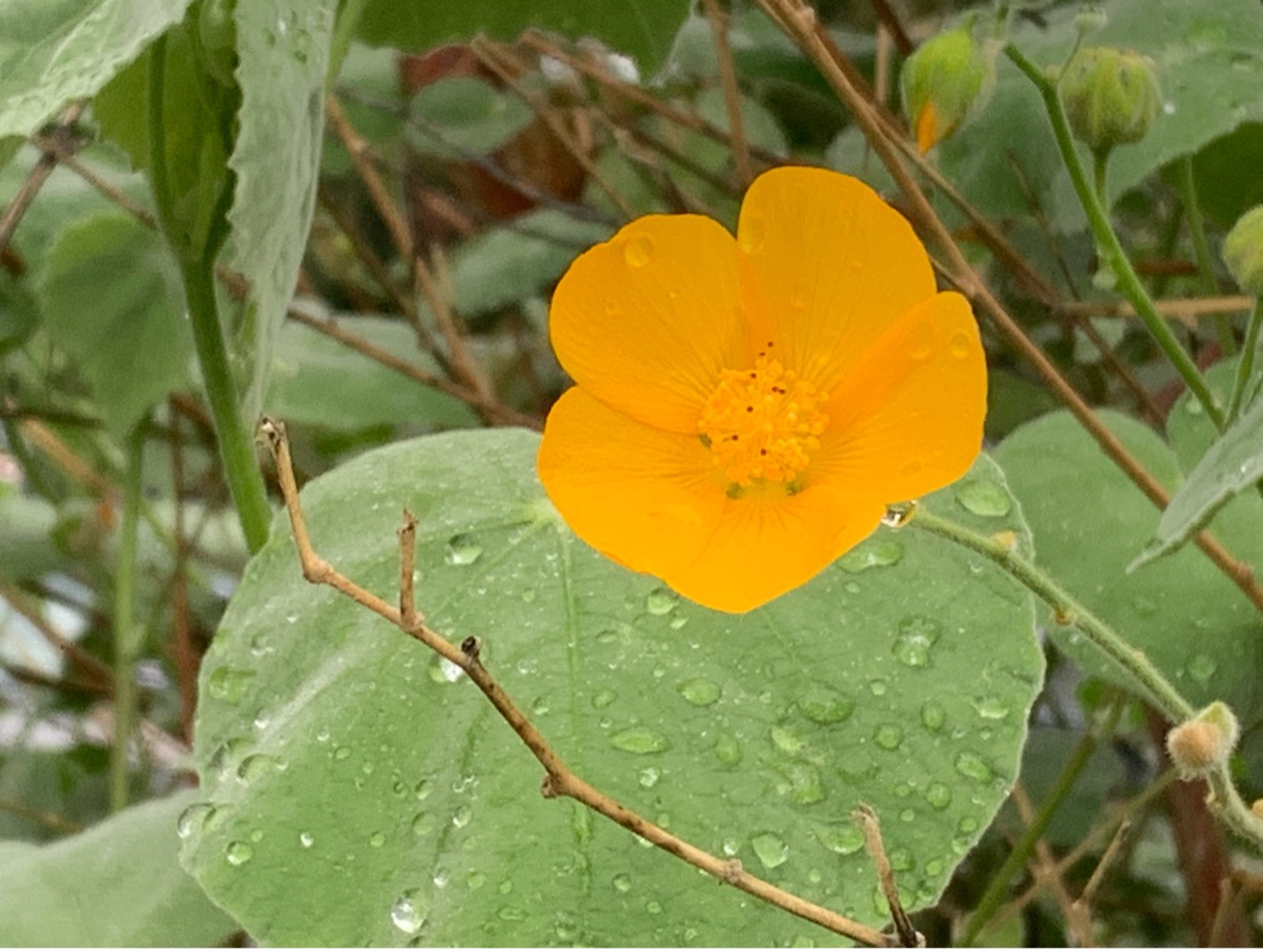
Palmer's abutilon (Abutilon palmeri) flower

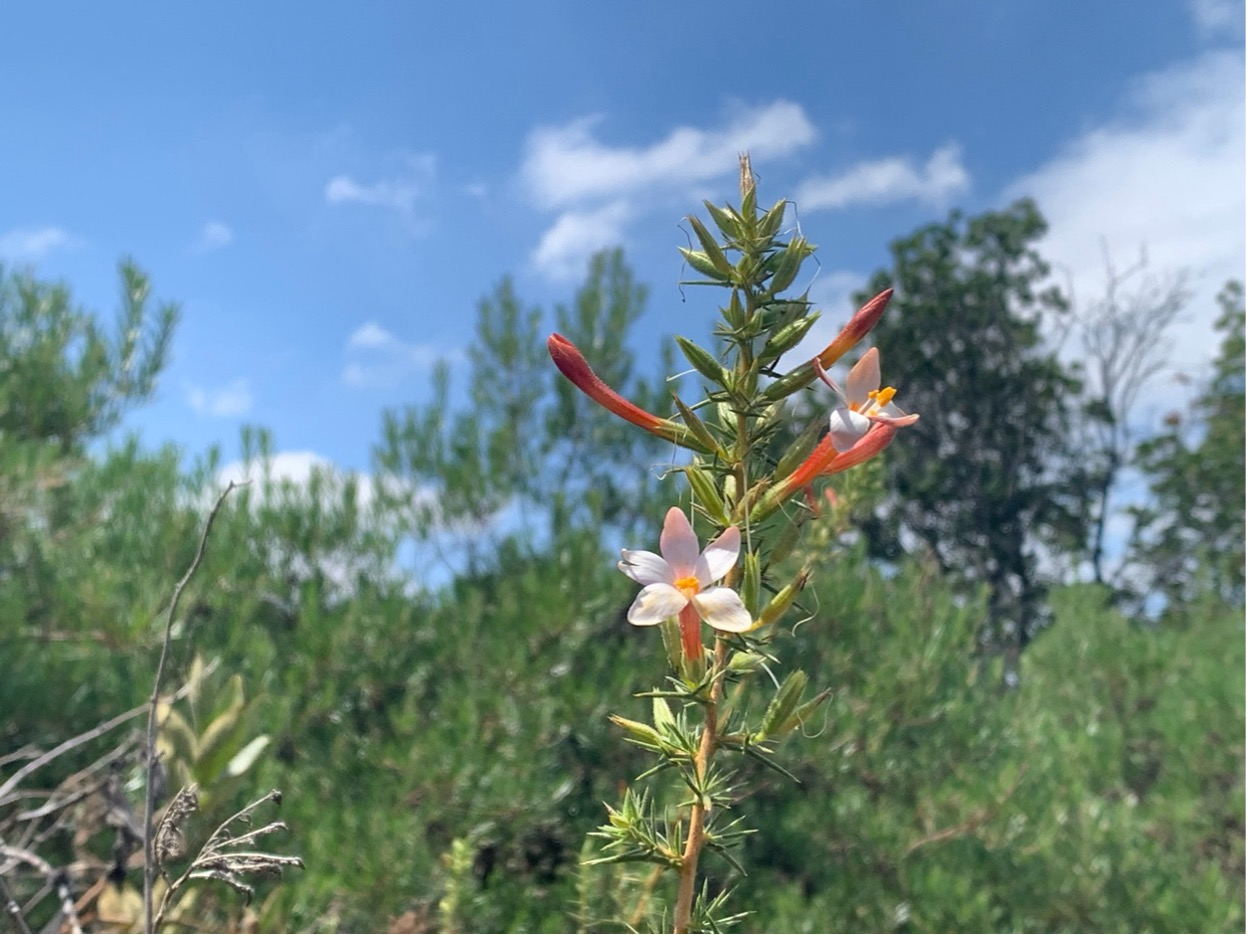
Baja phlox (Acanthogilia gloriosa) flowers in the california community gardens.

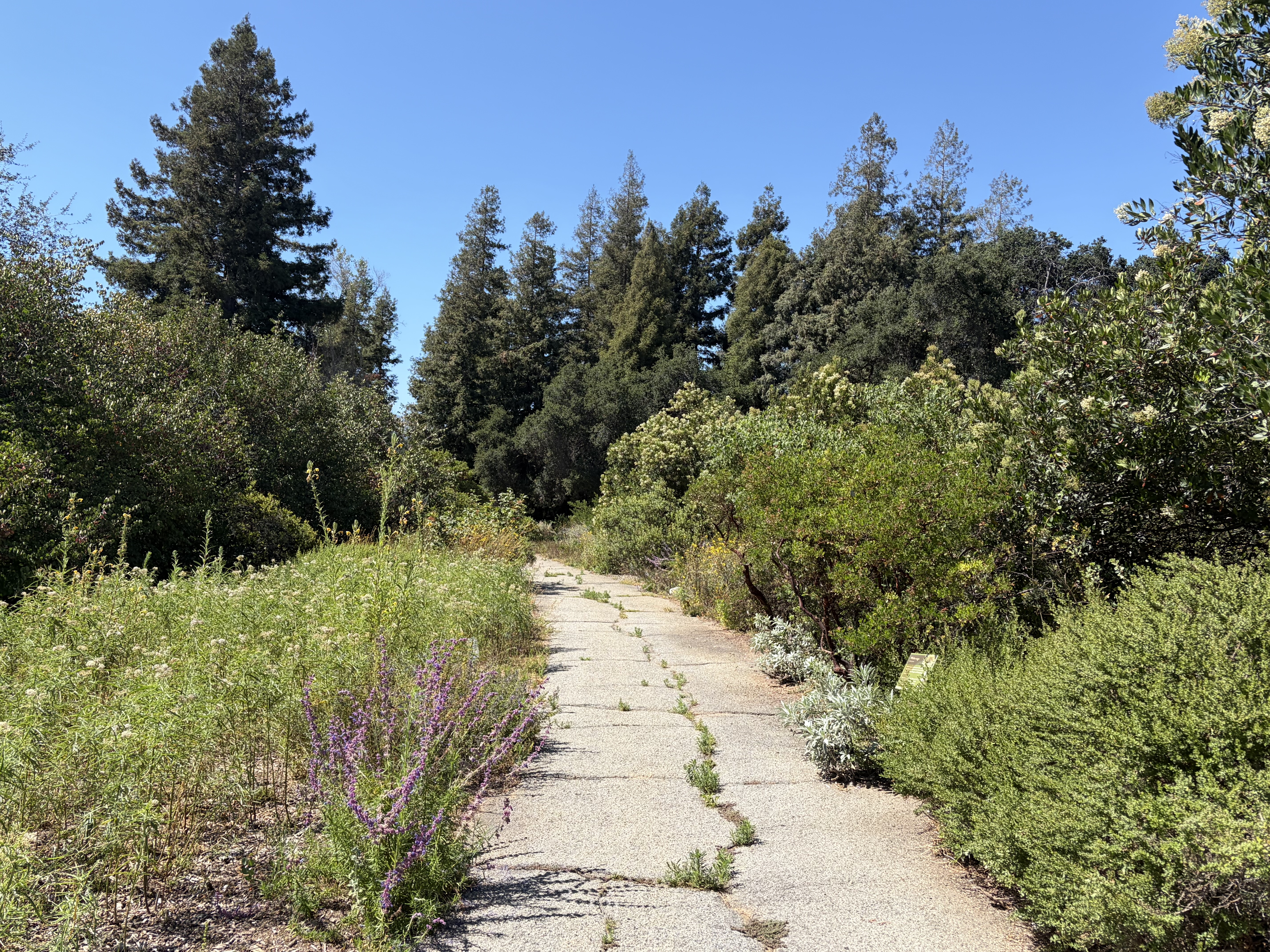
Mesa garden path with native wildflowers.

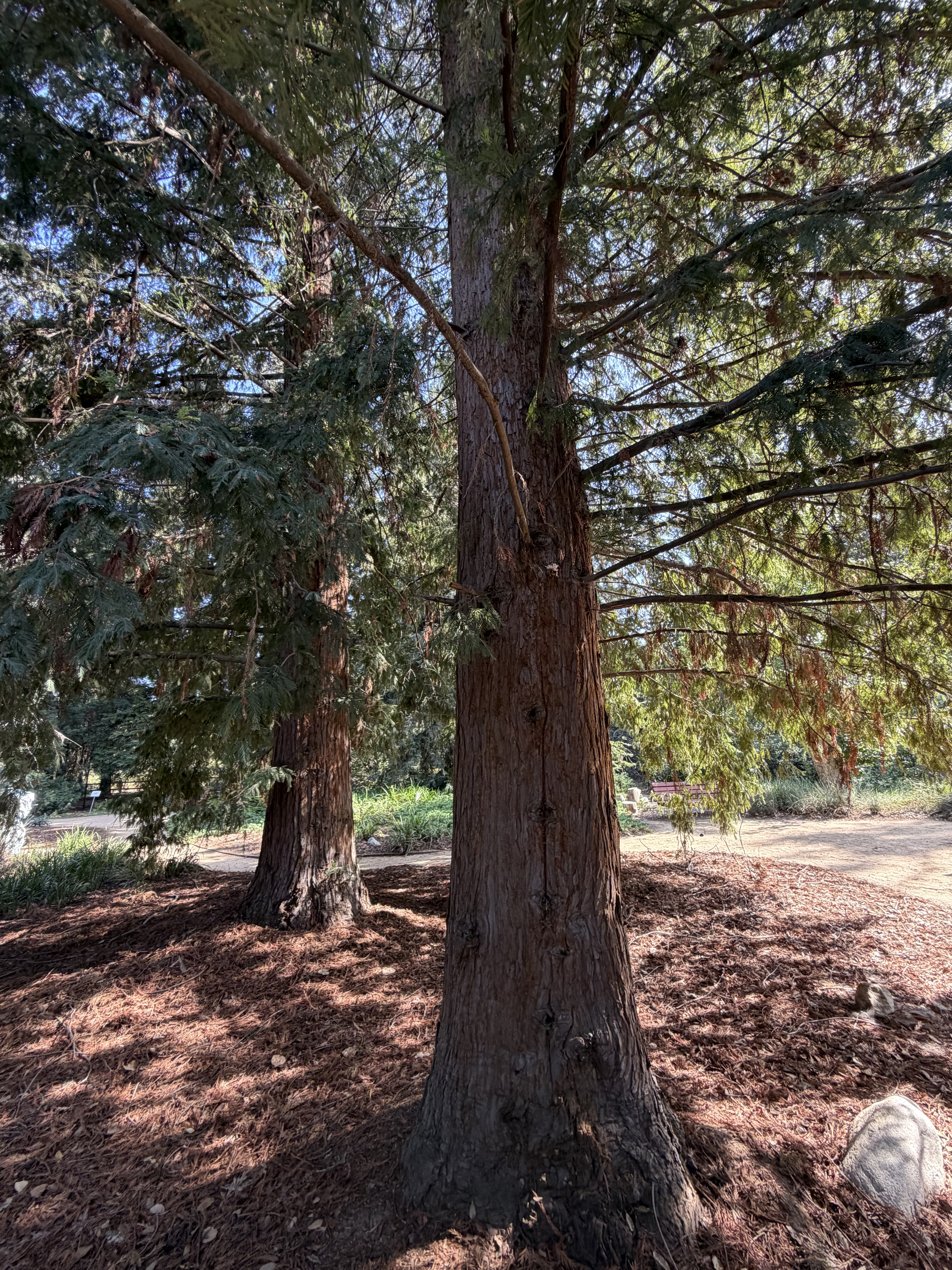
Redwood trees (Sequoia sempervirens) in the cultivar garden.

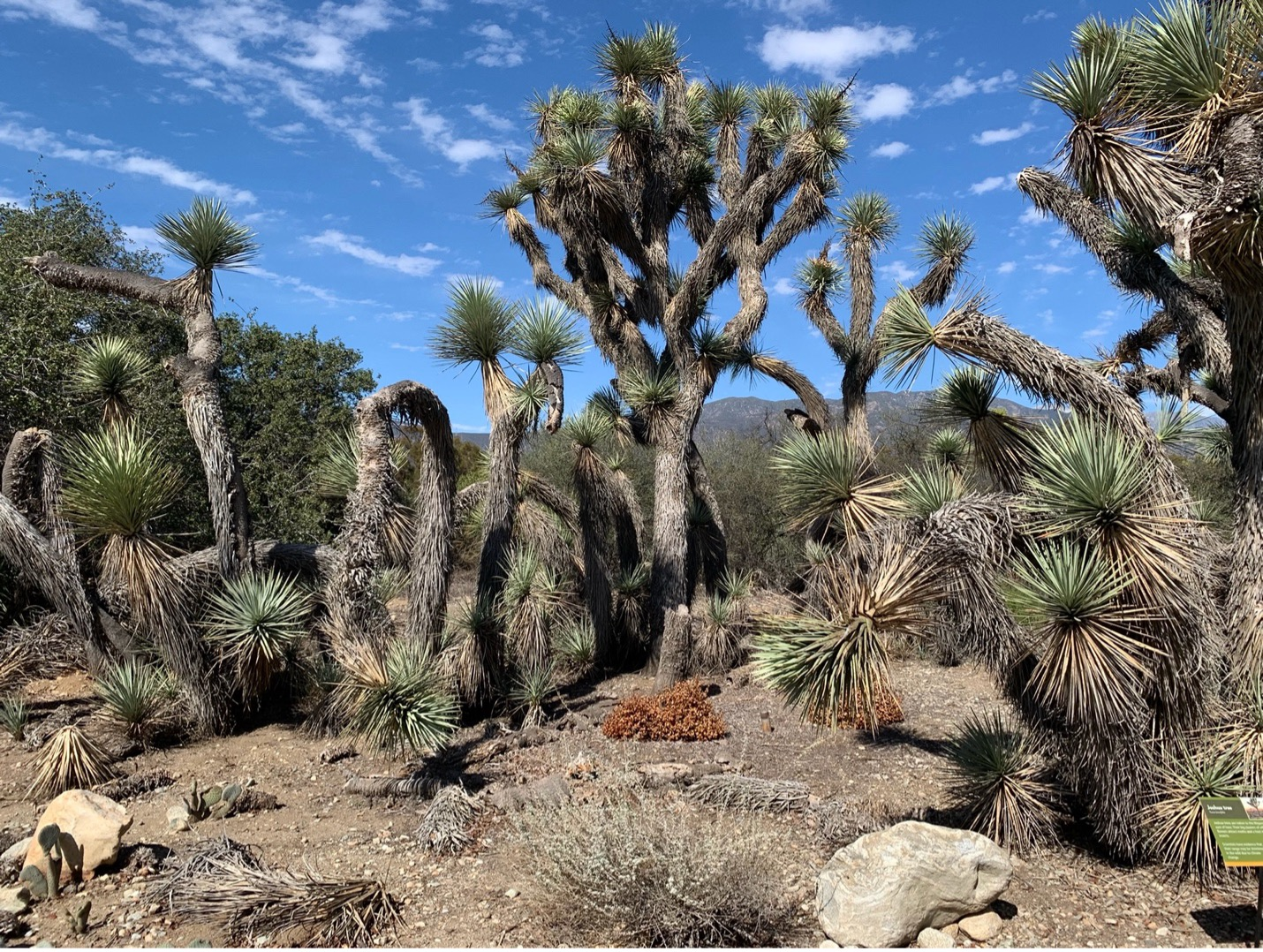
Joshua trees (Yucca brevifolia) growing in the California community gardens.

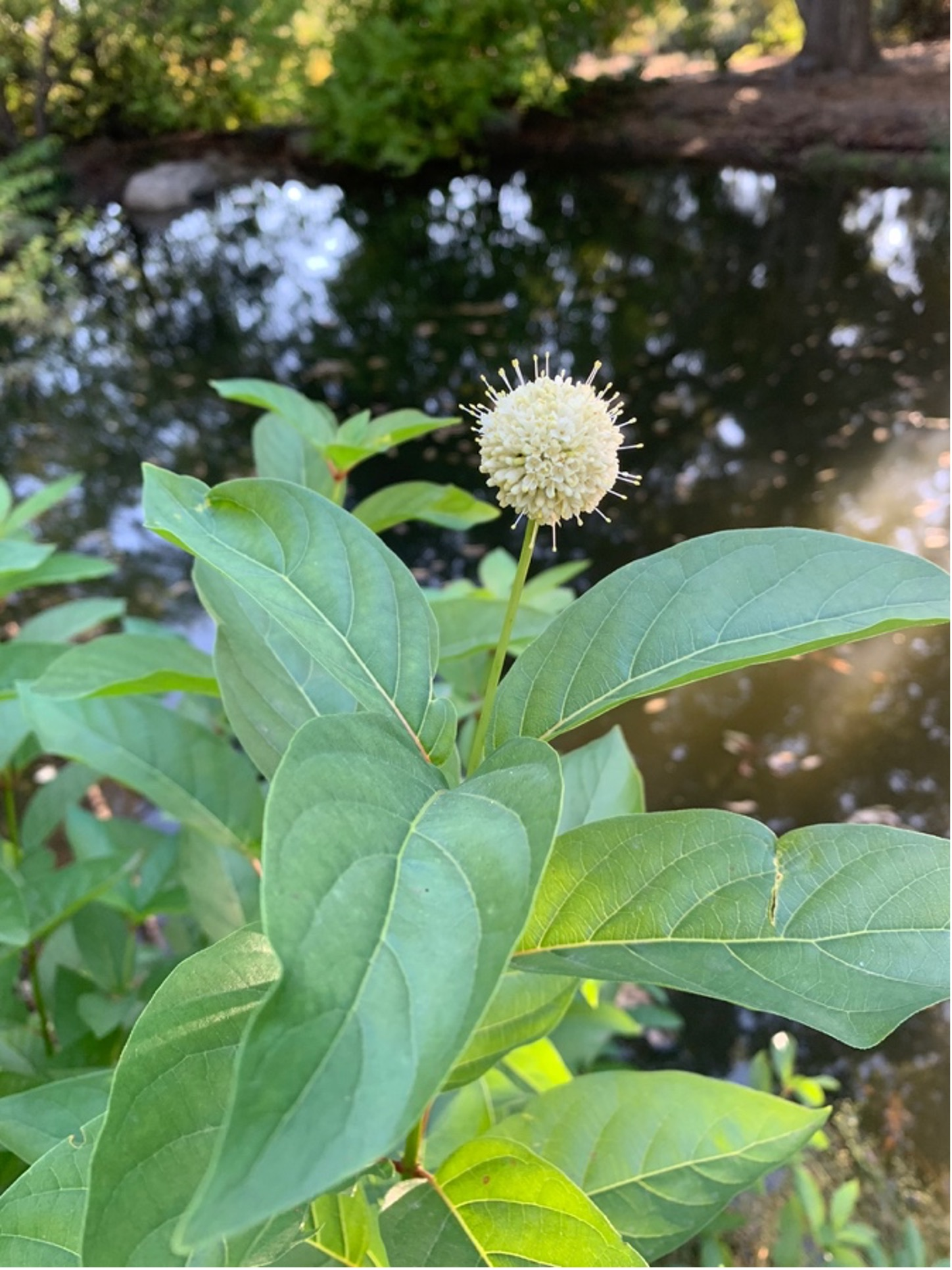
California button bush (Cephalanthus occidentalis) near the wildlife pond.

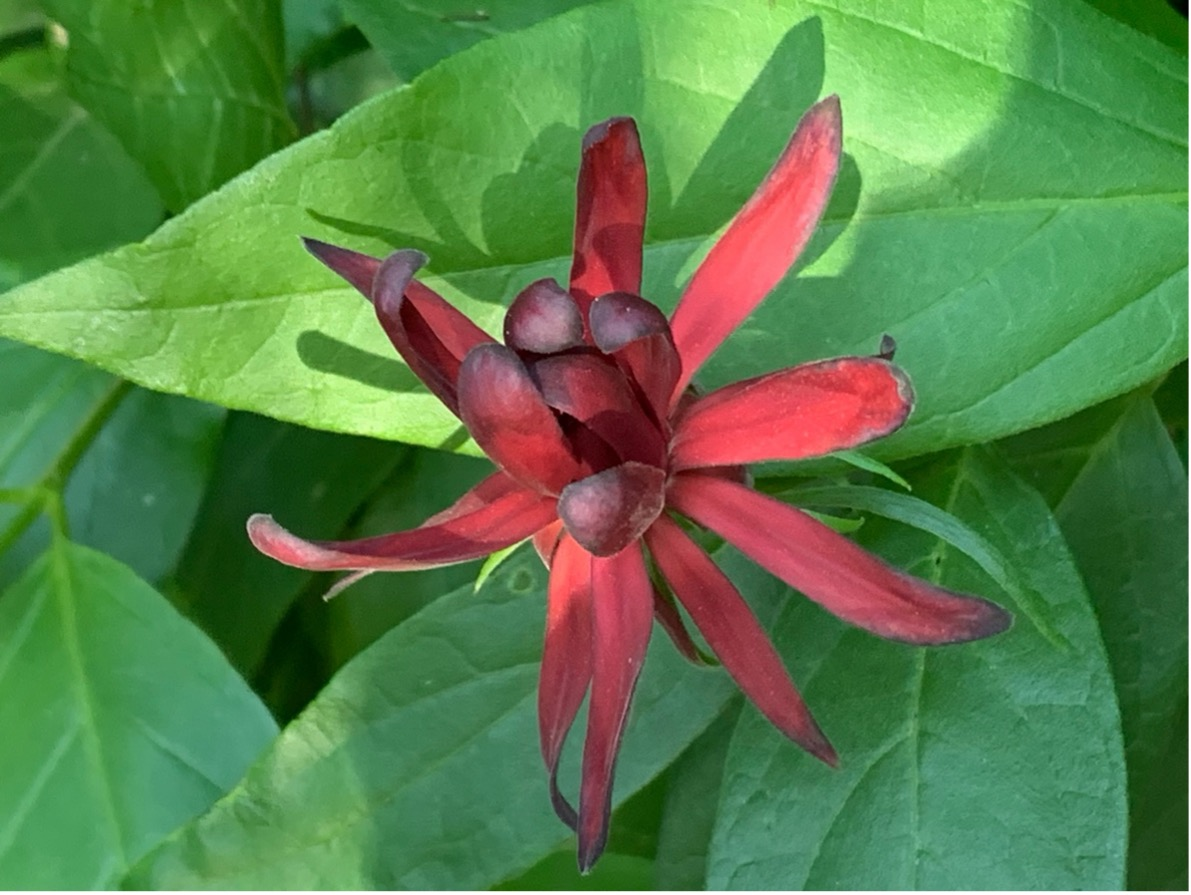
Spice bush (Calycanthus occidentalis) flower found within mesa gardens.

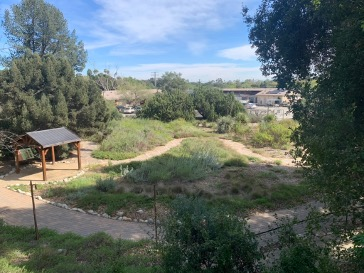
View of the wildflower meadow from the mesa.

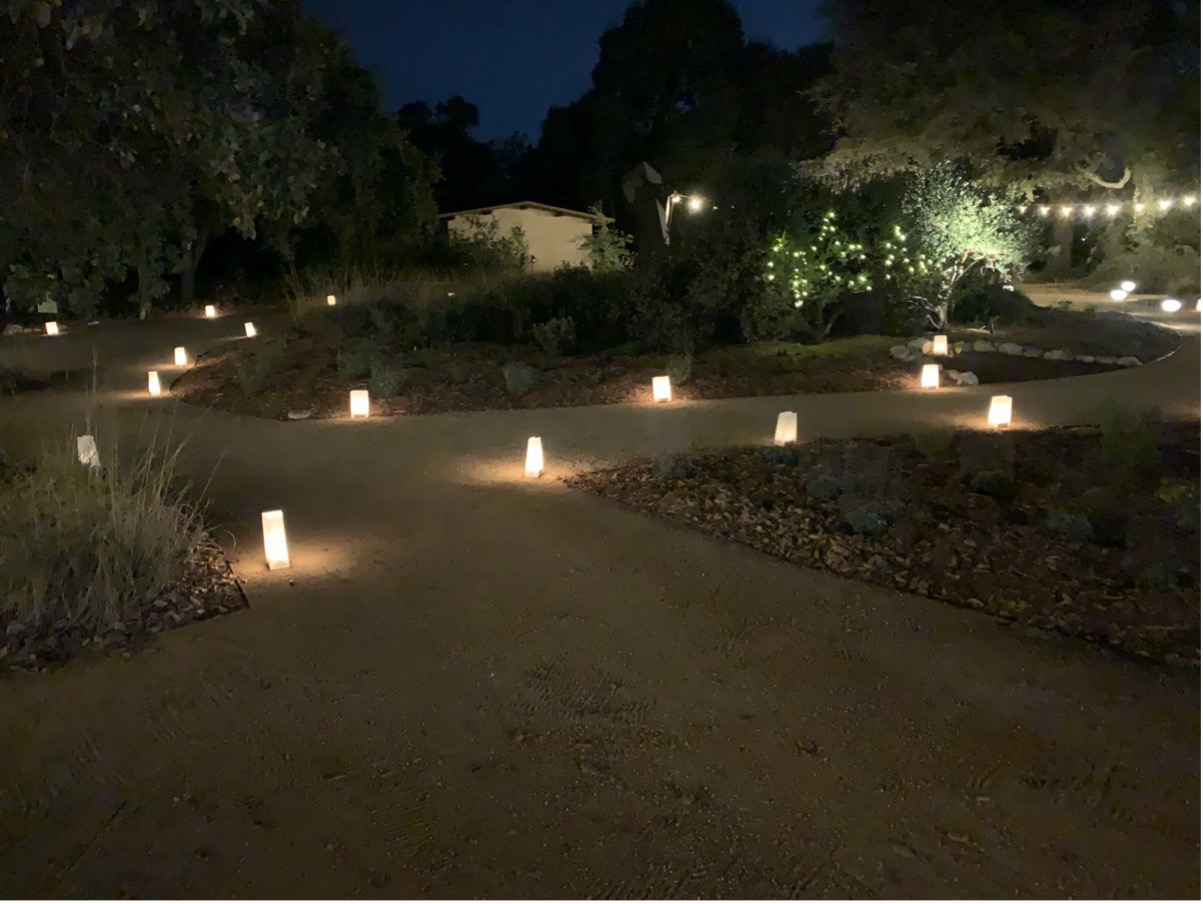
Luminaria nights

== See also ==
- Bernard Field Station
- John R. Rodman Arboretum in Claremont, California
- List of California native plants
- List of botanical gardens and arboretums in California
- List of botanical gardens in the United States
