= Saltugilia caruifolia =

Scientific classification
- Kingdom: Plantae
- Clade: Tracheophytes
- Clade: Angiosperms
- Clade: Eudicots
- Clade: Asterids
- Order: Ericales
- Family: Polemoniaceae
- Genus: Saltugilia
- Species: S. caruifolia

Binomial name
- Saltugilia caruifolia (Abrams) L.A. Johnson

Synonyms
- Gilia caruifolia

Species of flowering plant

Saltugilia caruifolia (syn. Gilia caruifolia) is a species of flowering plant in the phlox family known by the common names carawayleaf gilia and caraway-leaved woodland-gilia. It is native to the Peninsular Ranges of southern California and northern Baja California, where it grows in local habitat types such as chaparral. This herb produces a thin stem 12 centimeters to about a meter long. The leaves are up to 8 centimeters long at the base of the plant and divided into many finely subdivided lobes. The top of the stem branches into an inflorescence dotted with many glands. It produces flowers with lavender lobes dotted with darker purple near the bases.
