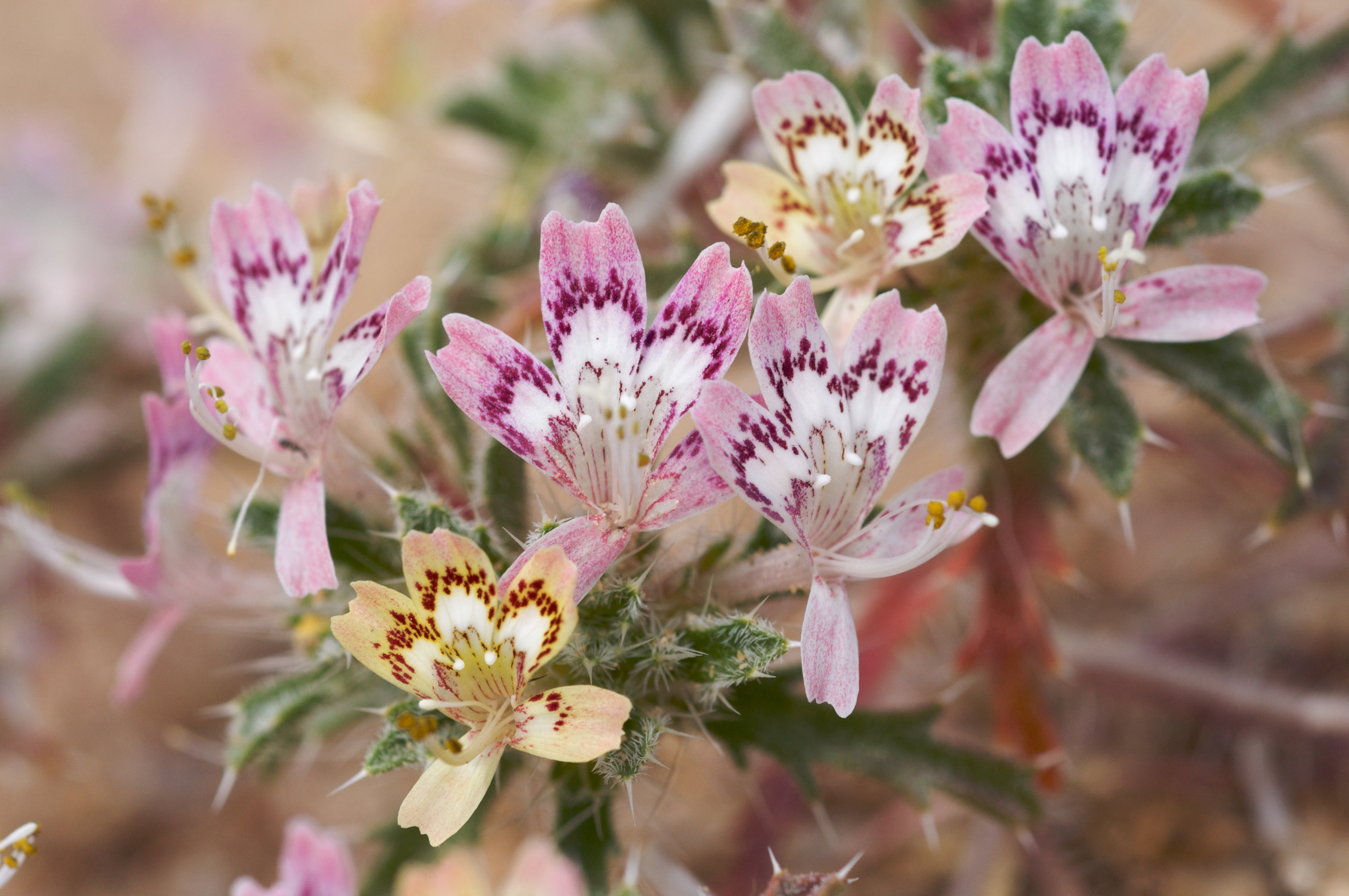

Scientific classification
- Kingdom: Plantae
- Clade: Tracheophytes
- Clade: Angiosperms
- Clade: Eudicots
- Clade: Asterids
- Order: Ericales
- Family: Polemoniaceae
- Genus: Loeseliastrum
- Species: L. matthewsii

Binomial name
- Loeseliastrum matthewsii (A.Gray) Timbrook, 1986

= Loeseliastrum matthewsii =

Species of flowering plant

Loeseliastrum matthewsii is an annual herbaceous plant of the Polemoniaceae family known by the common name desert calico. It is native to the Mojave and Sonoran Deserts of western North America, where it is relatively common. It is a small plant with alternately arranged leaves, each up to 4 centimeters long and edged with bristle-tipped teeth. The flower is white, lavender, and purple streaked with a maroon arch over a white patch on each of the upper lobes.

The plant was named for Washington Matthews.
