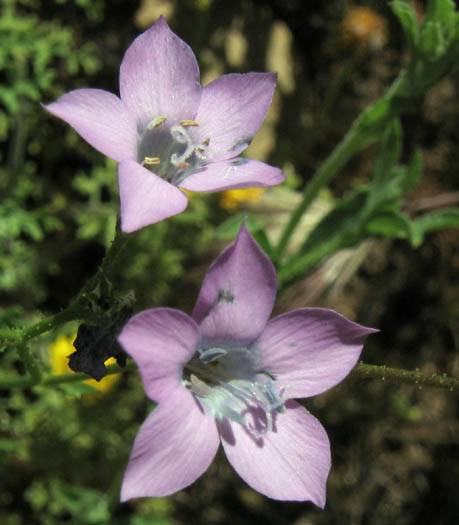

Scientific classification
- Kingdom: Plantae
- Clade: Tracheophytes
- Clade: Angiosperms
- Clade: Eudicots
- Clade: Asterids
- Order: Ericales
- Family: Polemoniaceae
- Genus: Saltugilia
- Species: S. splendens

Binomial name
- Saltugilia splendens (Douglas ex H.Mason & A.D.Grant) L.A.Johnson

Synonyms
- Gilia splendens

= Saltugilia splendens =

Species of flowering plant

Saltugilia splendens, is a species of flowering plant in the phlox family known by the common names splendid woodland-gilia, Grinnell's gilia and splendid gilia.

It is endemic to California, where it grows in the chaparral and forests of the southern California Coast Ranges, the Transverse Ranges, and the San Jacinto Mountains.

== Description ==
Saltugilia splendens is a gangly wildflower producing an erect stem with very slender branches reaching a maximum height near 80 centimeters. The stem is mostly naked with most of the intricately lobed leaves located in a basal rosette near ground level.

The inflorescence is open, bearing tiny flowers at the ends of thin, gland-dotted branches. Each flower is a pinkish, trumpet-shaped bloom up to around a centimeter long with protruding blue to lavender style and stamens.

The fruit is a capsule less than a centimeter long.
