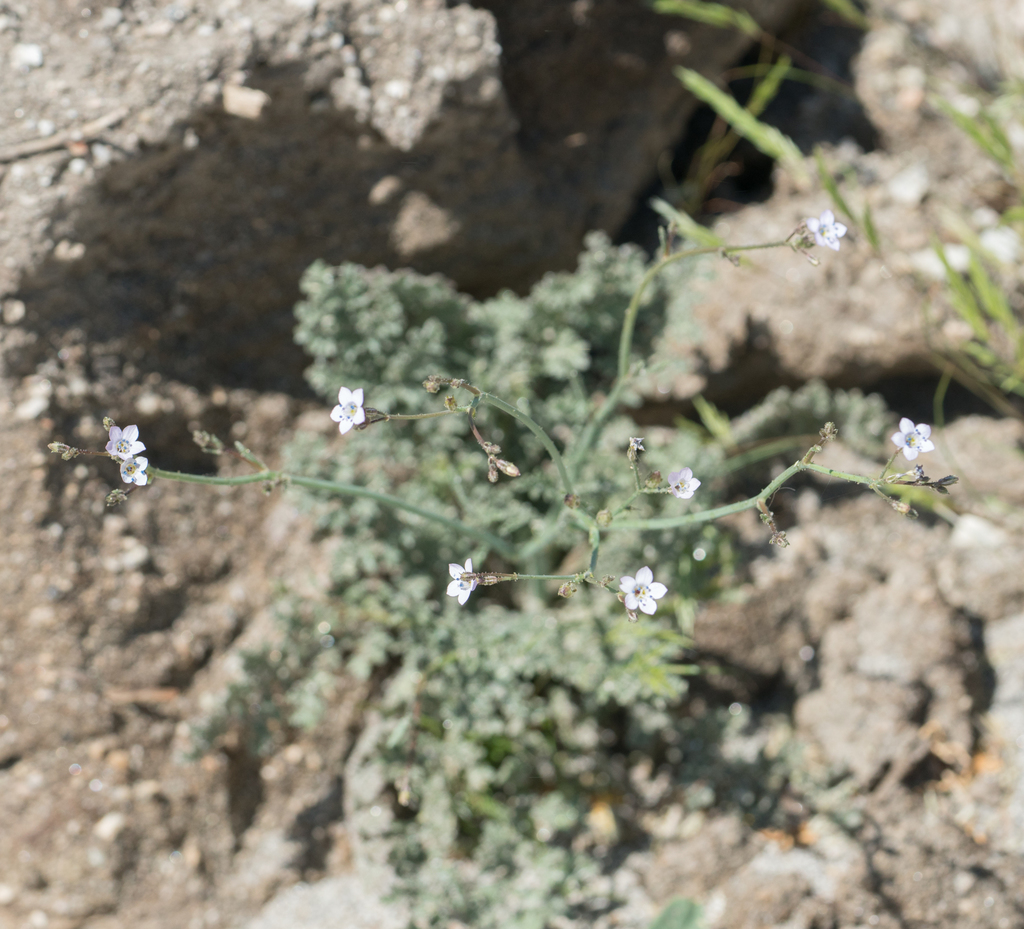

Conservation status
- Imperiled (NatureServe)

Scientific classification
- Kingdom: Plantae
- Clade: Embryophytes
- Clade: Tracheophytes
- Clade: Spermatophytes
- Clade: Angiosperms
- Clade: Eudicots
- Clade: Asterids
- Order: Ericales
- Family: Polemoniaceae
- Genus: Saltugilia
- Species: S. latimeri

Binomial name
- Saltugilia latimeri T.L.Weese & L.A.Johnson

Synonyms
- Gilia latimeri

= Saltugilia latimeri =

Species of flowering plant

Saltugilia latimeri is an uncommon species of flowering plant in the phlox family known by the common name Latimer's woodland gilia. It is endemic to California, where it is known from several scattered occurrences in the western Mojave Desert and outlying areas to the north. It occurs in dry rocky and sandy desert canyons. It was first described as a species in 2001.

This is an annual herb with a branching stem growing erect to a maximum height near 30 centimeters. The inflorescence is a branching array of small flowers. Each flower has a calyx of gland-dotted sepals and a tubular corolla roughly a centimeter long. The corolla has five pink lobes darkening to purple in the throat. The protruding stamens bear blue pollen on their anthers.
