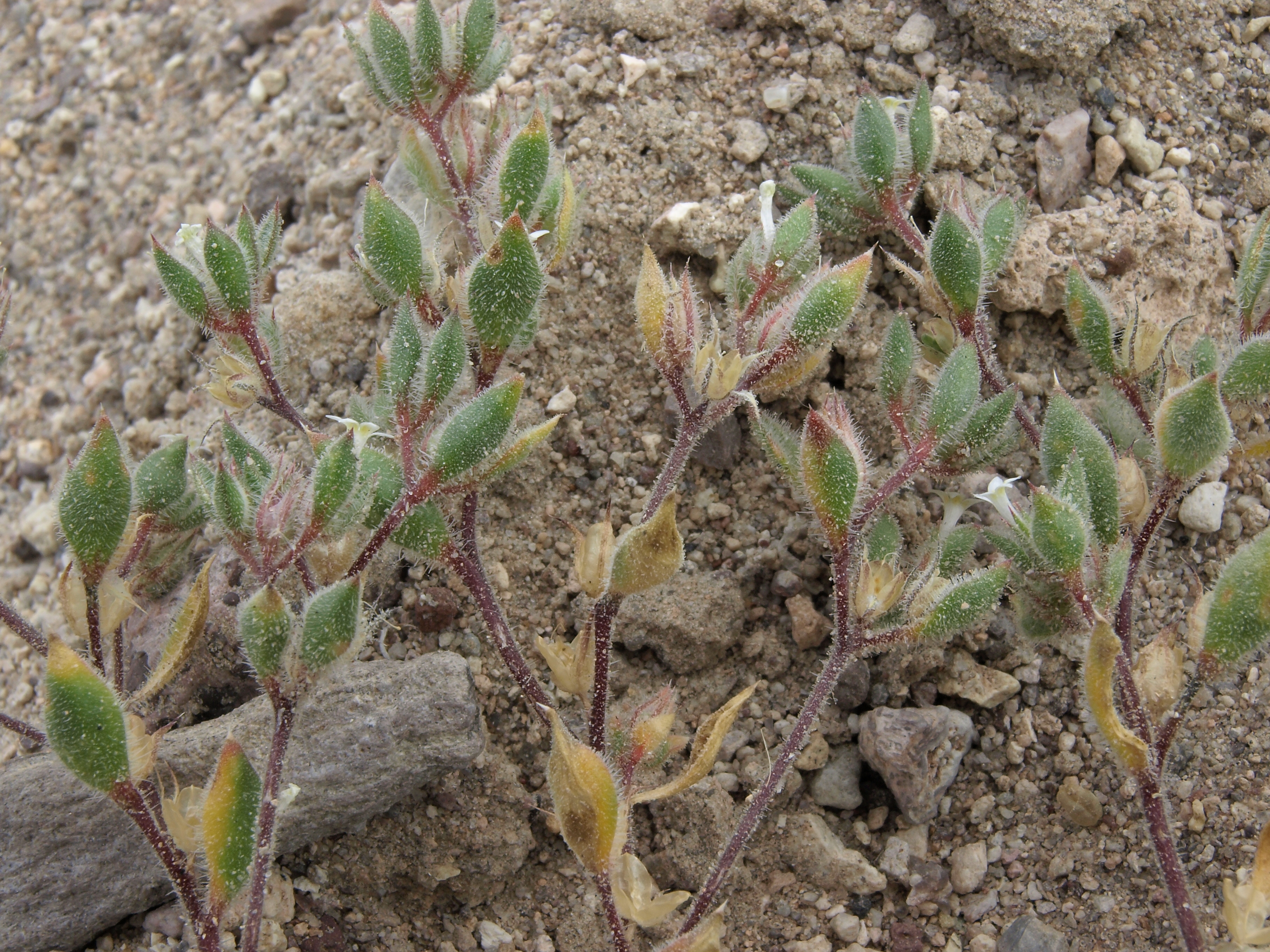
- In White Mountains, Nevada

Scientific classification
- Kingdom: Plantae
- Clade: Tracheophytes
- Clade: Angiosperms
- Clade: Eudicots
- Clade: Asterids
- Order: Ericales
- Family: Polemoniaceae
- Genus: Loeseliastrum
- Species: L. depressum

Binomial name
- Loeseliastrum depressum (M.E.Jones ex A.Gray) J.M.Porter

Synonyms
- Ipomopsis depressa

= Loeseliastrum depressum =

Species of flowering plant

Loeseliastrum depressum (formerly Ipomopsis depressa) is a species of flowering plant in the phlox family known by the common name depressed ipomopsis. It is native to the deserts of the southwestern United States, where it grows in sandy habitat. It is a petite, decumbent annual herb forming a small clump on the ground, its hairy, glandular stems no more than 10 centimeters long. The leaves are linear to oval and pointed, each not more than 2 centimeters long. They are coated in white hairs. The inflorescence is a dense cluster of tiny white flowers, each pointed corolla lobe just a millimeter long or so.
