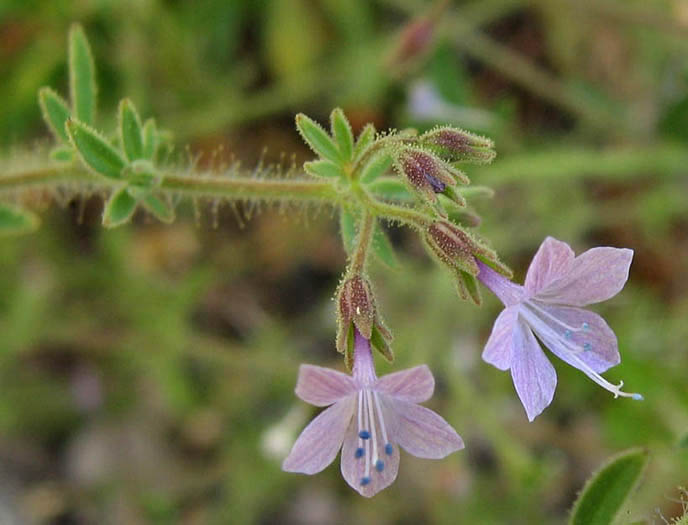
- Allophyllum glutinosum

Scientific classification
- Kingdom: Plantae
- Clade: Tracheophytes
- Clade: Angiosperms
- Clade: Eudicots
- Clade: Asterids
- Order: Ericales
- Family: Polemoniaceae
- Genus: Allophyllum (Nutt.) A.D.Grant & V.E.Grant (1955)

Species
- 5, see text

= Allophyllum =

Genus of flowering plants

Allophyllum is a small genus of flowering plants in the phlox family known as false gillyflowers. These are hairy, glandular annuals with tall, thin, branching stems topped with clusters of small tubular flowers in varying shades of purple. Some of the plants are sticky, and all have seeds which become gluey when wet. False gillyflowers are native to western North America, from Washington to Utah and northwestern Mexico.

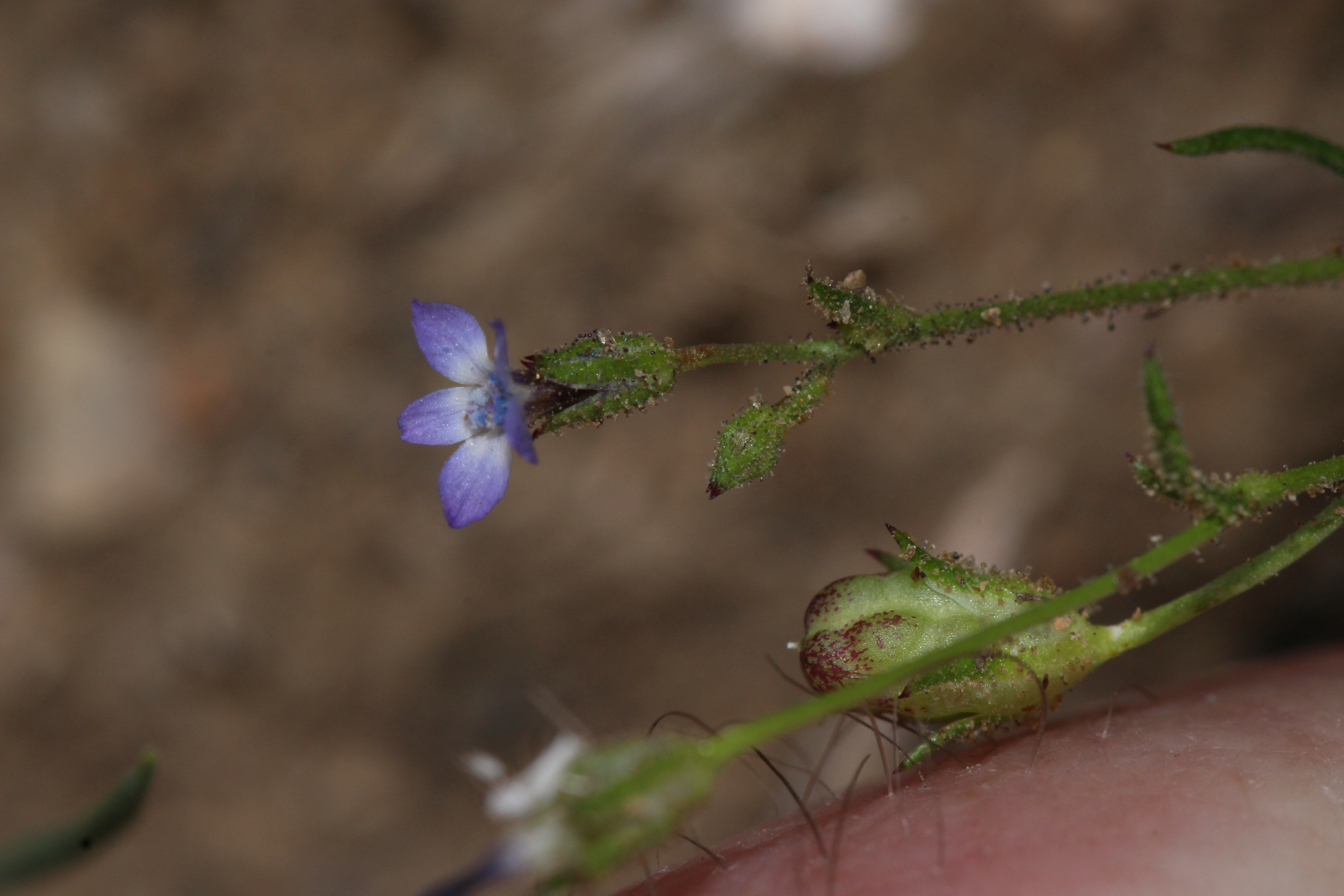
Allophyllum gilioides

== Species ==
Five species are accepted.

- Allophyllum divaricatum (Nutt.) A.D.Grant & V.E.Grant - purple false gillyflower
- Allophyllum gilioides (Benth.) A.D.Grant & V.E.Grant - dense false gillyflower
- Allophyllum glutinosum (Benth.) A.D.Grant & V.E.Grant - sticky false gillyflower
- Allophyllum integrifolium (Brand) A.D.Grant & V.E.Grant - white false gillyflower
- Allophyllum nemophilophyllum J.M.Porter & L.A.Johnson
