= Bryantiella palmeri =

Scientific classification
- Kingdom: Plantae
- Clade: Tracheophytes
- Clade: Angiosperms
- Clade: Eudicots
- Clade: Asterids
- Order: Ericales
- Family: Polemoniaceae
- Genus: Bryantiella; J.M.Porter (2000)
- Species: B. palmeri

Binomial name
- Bryantiella palmeri (S.Watson) J.M.Porter (2000)

Synonyms
- Gilia palmeri S.Watson (1889); Gilia palmeri subsp. spectabilis A.G.Day (1964)

Species of flowering plant

Bryantiella palmeri is a species of flowering plant belonging to the family Polemoniaceae. It is the sole species in genus Bryantiella. It is an annual native to Baja California, where it grows in deserts and dry shrublands.
