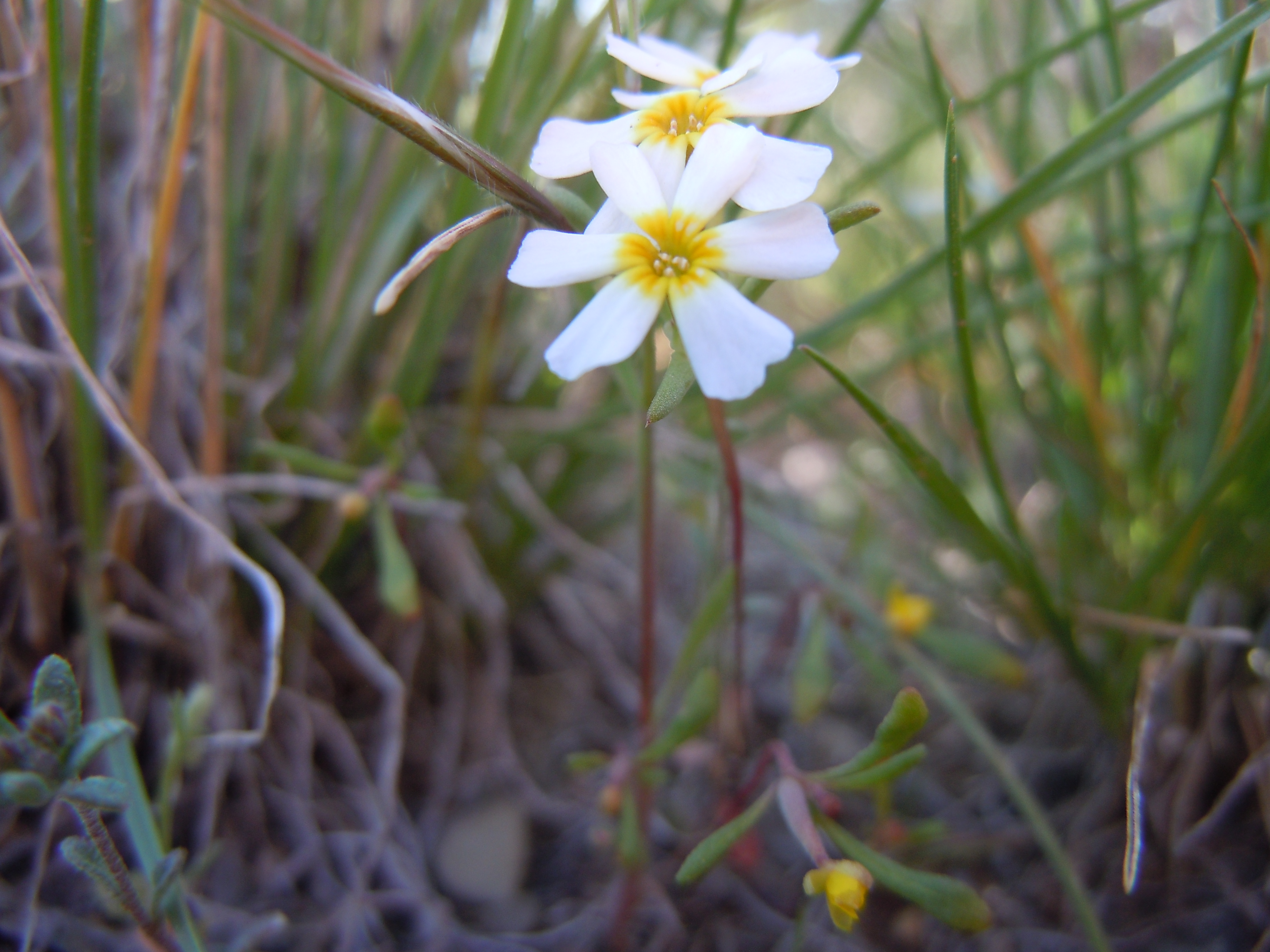
- Gymnosteris nudicaulis

Scientific classification
- Kingdom: Plantae
- Clade: Tracheophytes
- Clade: Angiosperms
- Clade: Eudicots
- Clade: Asterids
- Order: Ericales
- Family: Polemoniaceae
- Genus: Gymnosteris; Greene

Species
- 2 - see text

= Gymnosteris =

Genus of flowering plants

Gymnosteris is a small genus of flowering plants in the phlox family. These are small annual herbs which are native to the western United States. They generally lack leaves, but the bracts are large, fleshy, and leaflike.

There are two species:

- Gymnosteris nudicaulis - nakedstem gymnosteris
- Gymnosteris parvula - smallflower gymnosteris
