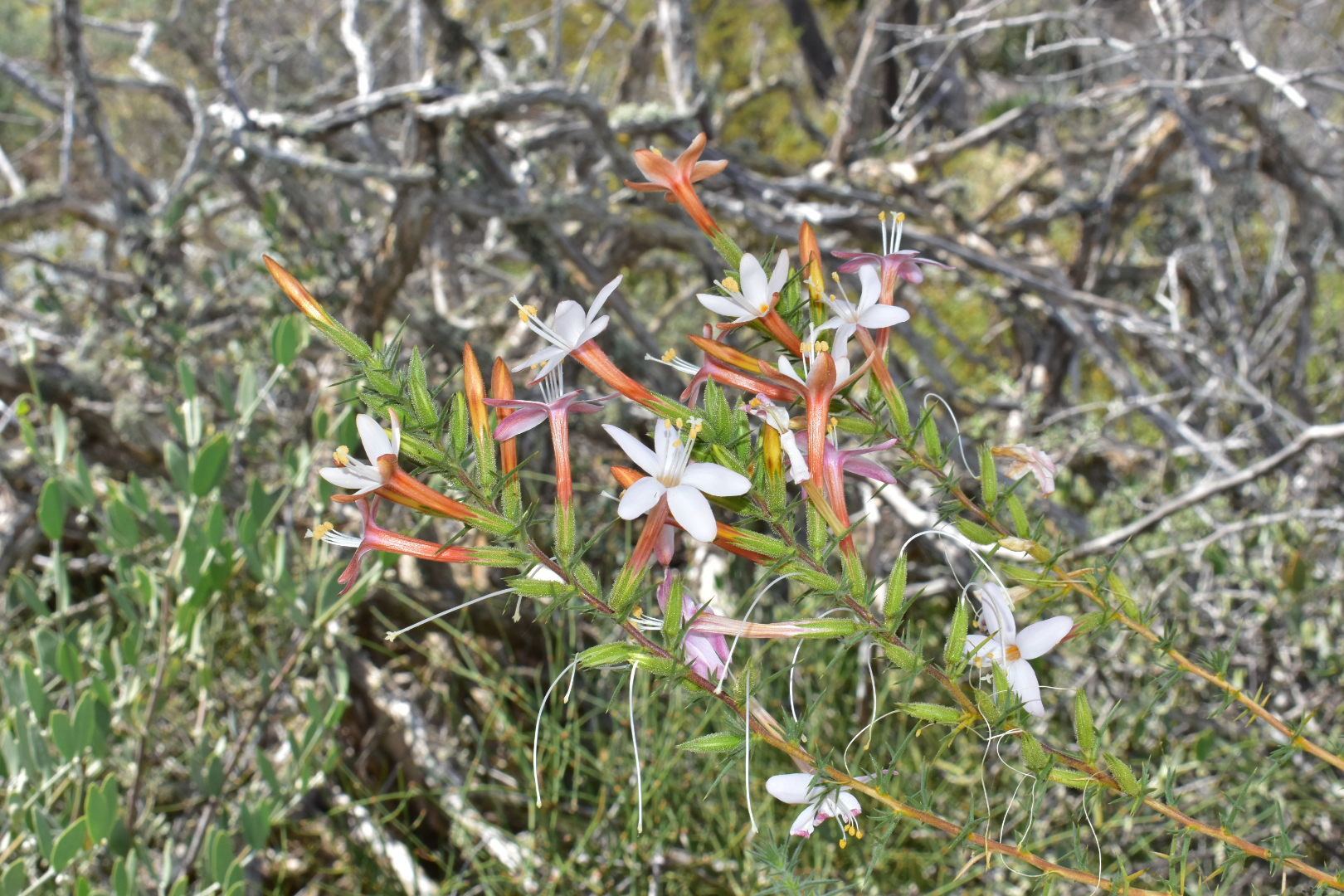

Scientific classification
- Kingdom: Plantae
- Clade: Tracheophytes
- Clade: Angiosperms
- Clade: Eudicots
- Clade: Asterids
- Order: Ericales
- Family: Polemoniaceae
- Genus: Acanthogilia; A.G.Day & Moran
- Species: A. gloriosa

Binomial name
- Acanthogilia gloriosa (Brandegee) A.G.Day & Moran

= Acanthogilia =

Genus of flowering plants

Acanthogilia is a genus that contains a single species (Acanthogilia gloriosa) of desert shrub from Baja California, Mexico. It was first scientifically described as a genus in 1986.

== Classification ==
Its closest relatives within the family Polemoniaceae are not clear. Some evidence suggests it was first to diverge from the ancestral member of that family, some puts it in a group with Bonplandia, Cobaea, and Cantua, and some say that those three genera diverged first, followed by Acanthogilia (followed by the rest of the family).
