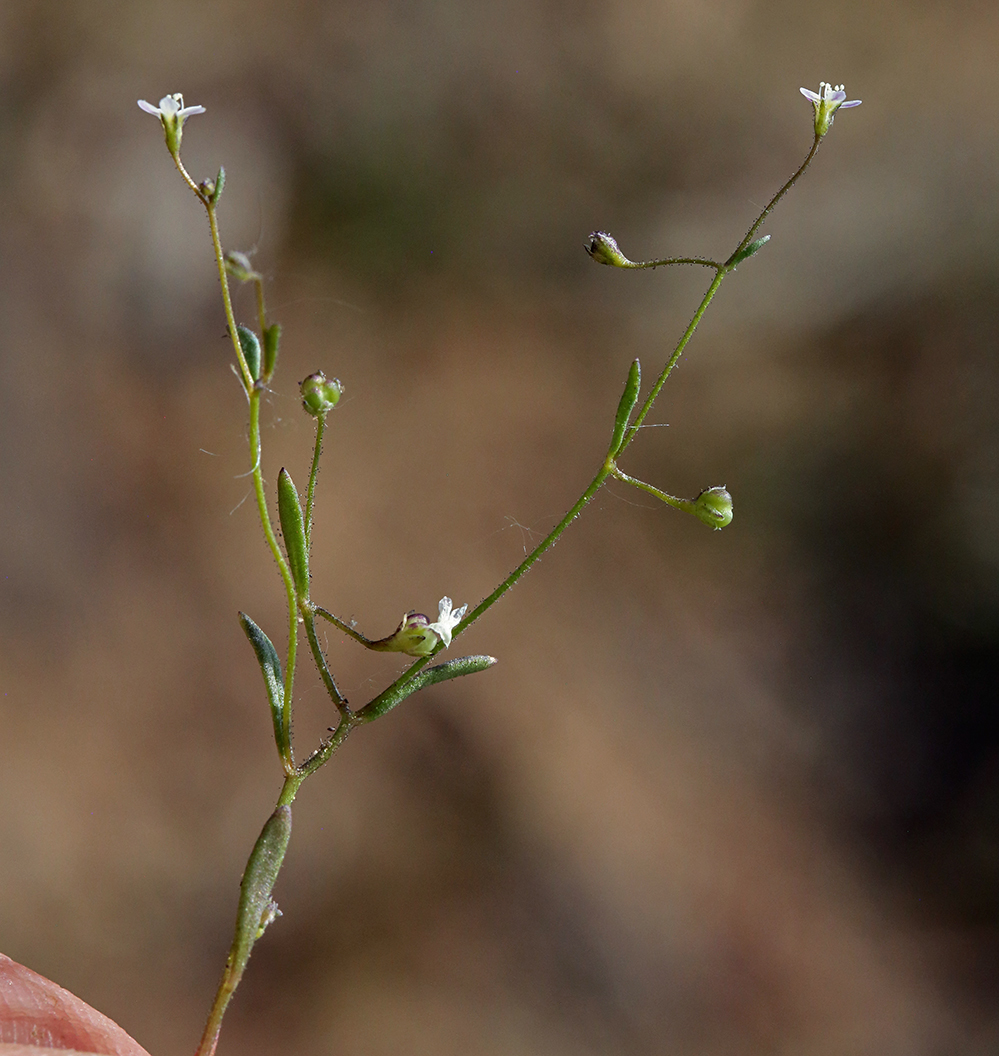
- Bodie Hills south of Willow Springs, Mono County, California

Conservation status
- Apparently Secure (NatureServe)

Scientific classification
- Kingdom: Plantae
- Clade: Embryophytes
- Clade: Tracheophytes
- Clade: Spermatophytes
- Clade: Angiosperms
- Clade: Eudicots
- Clade: Asterids
- Order: Ericales
- Family: Polemoniaceae
- Genus: Lathrocasis; L.A.Johnson
- Species: L. tenerrima

Binomial name
- Lathrocasis tenerrima (A.Gray) L.A.Johnson

Synonyms
- List: Allophyllum tenerrimum; Gilia tenerrima; Navarretia tenerrima; Tintinabulum tenerrimum

= Lathrocasis =

Plant genus in the phlox family

Lathrocasis is a genus of flowering plants in the phlox family from the western United States and British Columbia. The genus has one species, Lathrocasis tenerrima, commonly delicate gilia.

== Taxonomy ==
In 1870 Asa Gray described a new species in the Gilia genus which he named Gilia tenerrima. This species was then moved several times, but was placed in a new genus by Leigh Alma Johnson in 2000. Gray described the species from a specimen collected in Utah in hills near the Bear River in 1869. The genus is classified as part of the Polemoniaceae family and is a monotypic taxon. Lathrocasis tenerrima is the accepted name according to Plants of the World Online, although it is still listed as Gilia tenerrima in sources such as NatureServe. The species has no subspecies and four homotypic synonyms.

Table of Synonyms
Name	Year	Notes
Allophyllum tenerrimum (A.Gray) V.E.Grant	1998	Published 1999
Gilia tenerrima A.Gray	1870	
Navarretia tenerrima (A.Gray) Kuntze	1891	
Tintinabulum tenerrimum (A.Gray) A.G.Day & V.E.Grant	1998	Published 1999

=== Names ===
Lathrocasis tenerrima is known by the common names delicate gilia or delicate gily-flower.
