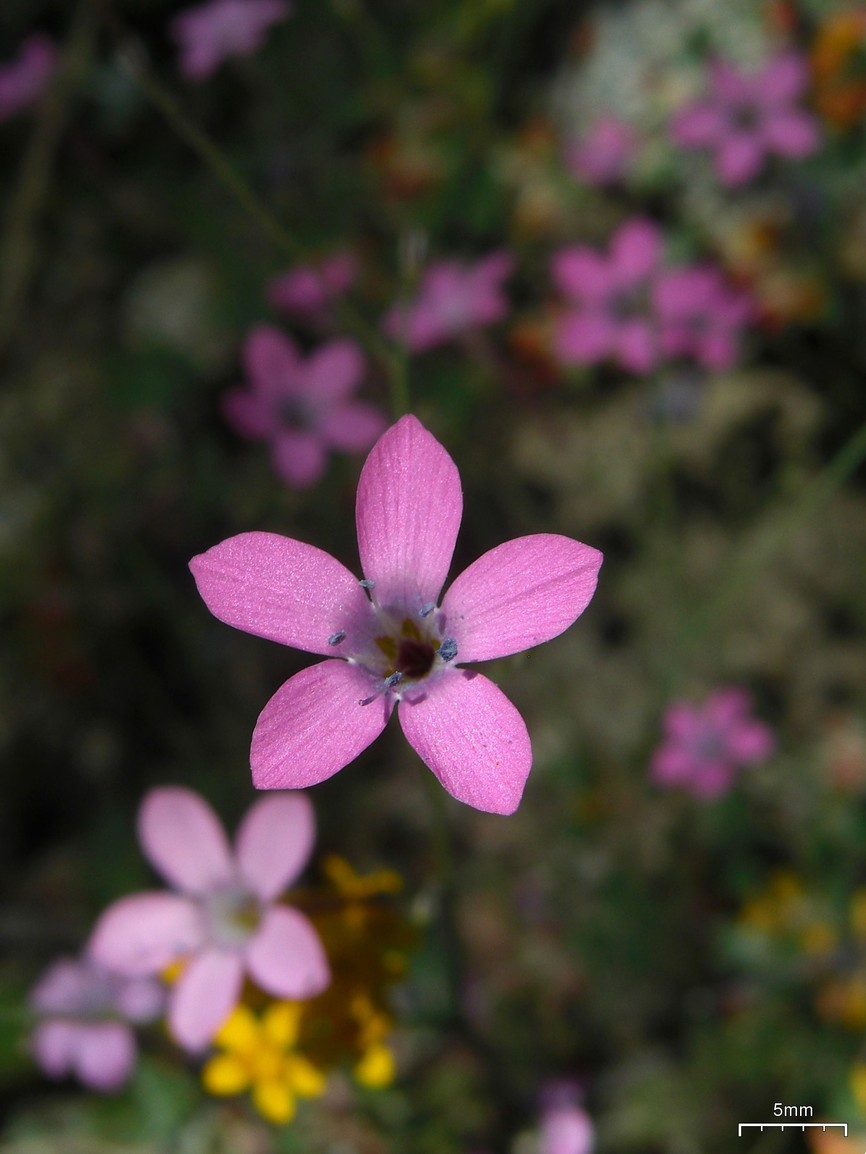
- Saltugilia splendens ssp. grantii

Scientific classification
- Kingdom: Plantae
- Clade: Tracheophytes
- Clade: Angiosperms
- Clade: Eudicots
- Clade: Asterids
- Order: Ericales
- Family: Polemoniaceae
- Genus: Saltugilia (V.E. Grant) L.A. Johnson

Species
- 4, see text

Synonyms
- Gilia sect. Saltugilia

= Saltugilia =

Genus of flowering plants

Saltugilia is a genus of flowering plants in the phlox family, Polemoniaceae. They are known commonly as woodland gilias. There are four species. Two are endemic to California in the United States, and the distributions of the other two extend into Baja California in Mexico.

This genus was erected in the year 2000 to segregate three species from the genus Gilia on the basis of phylogenetic evidence. Analysis of DNA was used in the formation of the new taxon, and studies of other characteristics of the plants, such as morphological, palynological, and ecological traits, were considered. Saltugilia was a section of genus Gilia. These three species were classified in the new genus Saltugilia, and the fourth was newly described to science in 2001.

== Description ==
These plants are annual herbs producing solitary, branching stems 15 to 100 centimeters tall. Most of the leaves are arranged in a basal rosette around the stem. Most of the herbage is coated with trichomes tipped with glands. The inflorescence is an open array of branches bearing single and paired flowers. The funnel-shaped corollas are pink, lavender, blue, or white, with yellow spotting in the throat. The stamens bear blue pollen.

== Diversity ==
- The southern gilia, Saltugilia australis, formerly Gilia australis, is a plant of the chaparral of southern California. It is also known from Baja California. The flower corollas have white tubes and pink or blue lobes.
- The caraway-leaved woodland gilia, Saltugilia caruifolia, formerly G. caruifolia, grows in chaparral and forest habitat in southern California and Baja California. The flowers are purple, sometimes with white throats.
- Latimer's woodland gilia, Saltugilia latimeri, was separated from S. australis. It is a California endemic limited mainly to San Bernardino and Riverside Counties. The corollas are purple with pink lobes. It grows in the desert.
- The splendid woodland gilia, Saltugilia splendens, formerly Gilia splendens, is also known as S. grinnellii, which may be the technically correct name because it was established first. It is endemic to the mountain ranges of southern California. There are two subspecies, ssp. grantii and ssp. splendens. This species has the largest flowers of the four, up to 3.6 centimeters in ssp. grantii.
