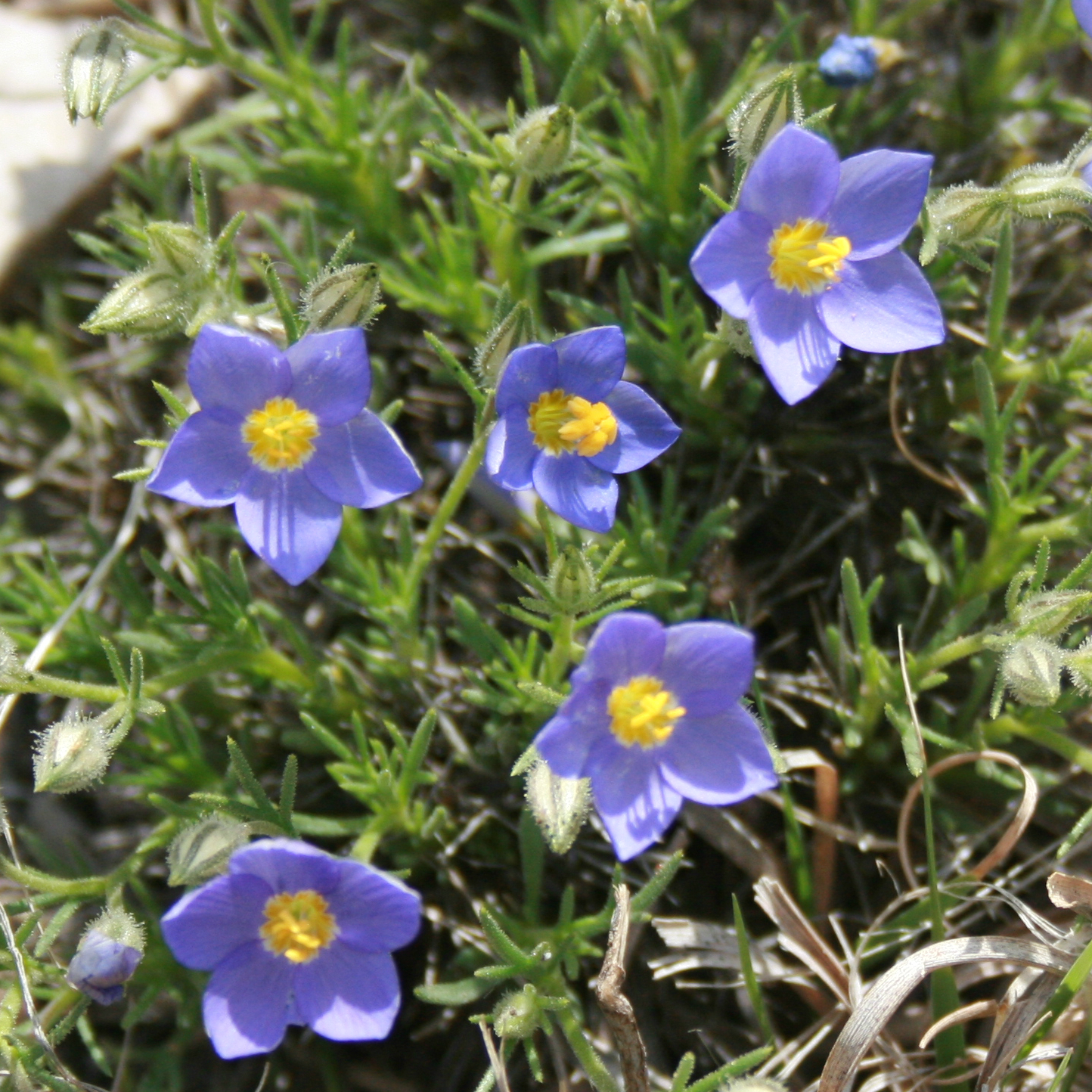
- Giliastrum rigidulum in Lake Meredith National Recreation Area, Texas

Scientific classification
- Kingdom: Plantae
- Clade: Tracheophytes
- Clade: Angiosperms
- Clade: Eudicots
- Clade: Asterids
- Order: Ericales
- Family: Polemoniaceae
- Genus: Giliastrum (Brand) Rydb. (1917)

= Giliastrum =

Genus of plants

Giliastrum is a genus of flowering plants belonging to the family Polemoniaceae.

== Taxonomy ==
The genus name of Giliastrum is in honour of Filippo Luigi Gilii (1756–1821), an Italian clergyman, naturalist and astronomer who worked in part in the Vatican City, and it was first described and published in Fl. Rocky Mts. on page 699 in 1917.

== Species ==
Known species, according to Kew;

- Giliastrum acerosum (A.Gray) Rydb.
- Giliastrum castellanosii J.M.Porter
- Giliastrum foetidum (Gillies ex Benth.) J.M.Porter
- Giliastrum gypsophilum (B.L.Turner) J.M.Porter
- Giliastrum incisum (Benth.) J.M.Porter
- Giliastrum insigne (Brand) J.M.Porter
- Giliastrum ludens (Shinners) J.M.Porter
- Giliastrum purpusii (Brandegee) J.M.Porter
- Giliastrum rigidulum (Benth.) Rydb.
- Giliastrum stewartii (I.M.Johnst.) J.M.Porter

== Distribution ==
Its native range is the central and southwestern USA (found in the states of Arizona, Colorado, Kansas, New Mexico, Oklahoma and Texas) to the Caribbean island of Hispaniola (in the Dominican Republic) and Mexico down to northwestern Argentina.
