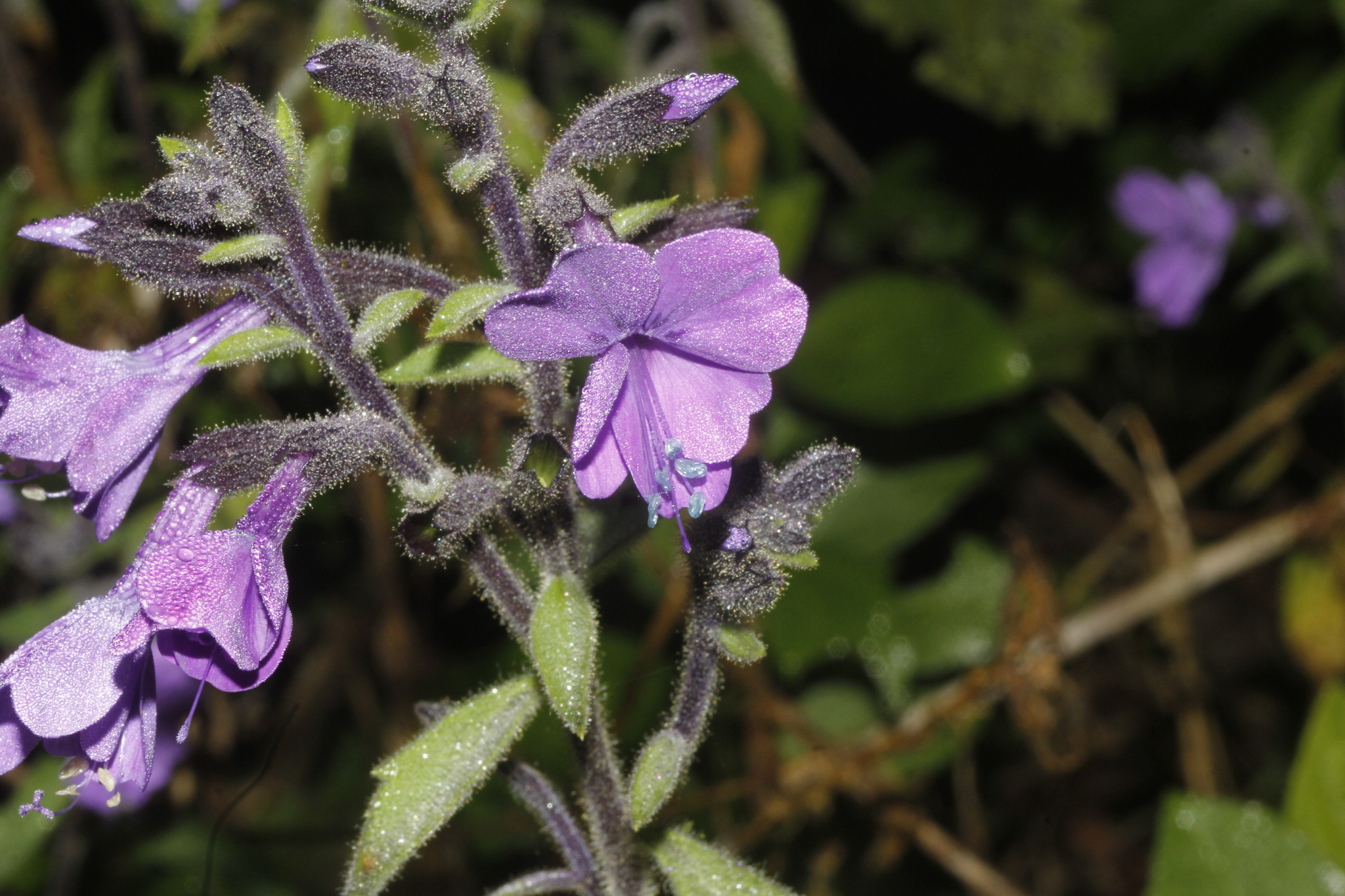
- Flower of Bonplandia geminiflora

Scientific classification
- Kingdom: Plantae
- Clade: Tracheophytes
- Clade: Angiosperms
- Clade: Eudicots
- Clade: Asterids
- Order: Ericales
- Family: Polemoniaceae
- Genus: Bonplandia; Cav.

= Bonplandia =

Genus of flowering plants

Bonplandia is a genus of flowering plants belonging to the family Polemoniaceae.

Its native range is Mexico to Guatemala.

Species:

- Bonplandia geminiflora Cav.
- Bonplandia linearis B.L.Rob.
