= Dayia (plant) =

Scientific classification
- Kingdom: Plantae
- Clade: Tracheophytes
- Clade: Angiosperms
- Clade: Eudicots
- Clade: Asterids
- Order: Ericales
- Family: Polemoniaceae
- Genus: Dayia; J.M.Porter

Genus of flowering plants

Dayia is a genus of flowering plants belonging to the family Polemoniaceae.

Its native range is Southwestern Texas to Northern Mexico, and Northern Chile.

The genus name of 'Dayia' is in honour of Alva Day Grant (1920–2014), American botanist and professor at the University of Texas at Austin.

Species known:

- Dayia glutinosa (Phil.) J.M.Porter
- Dayia grantii J.M.Porter
- Dayia havardii (A.Gray) J.M.Porter
- Dayia scabra (Brandegee) J.M.Porter
- Dayia sonorae (Rose) J.M.Porter
