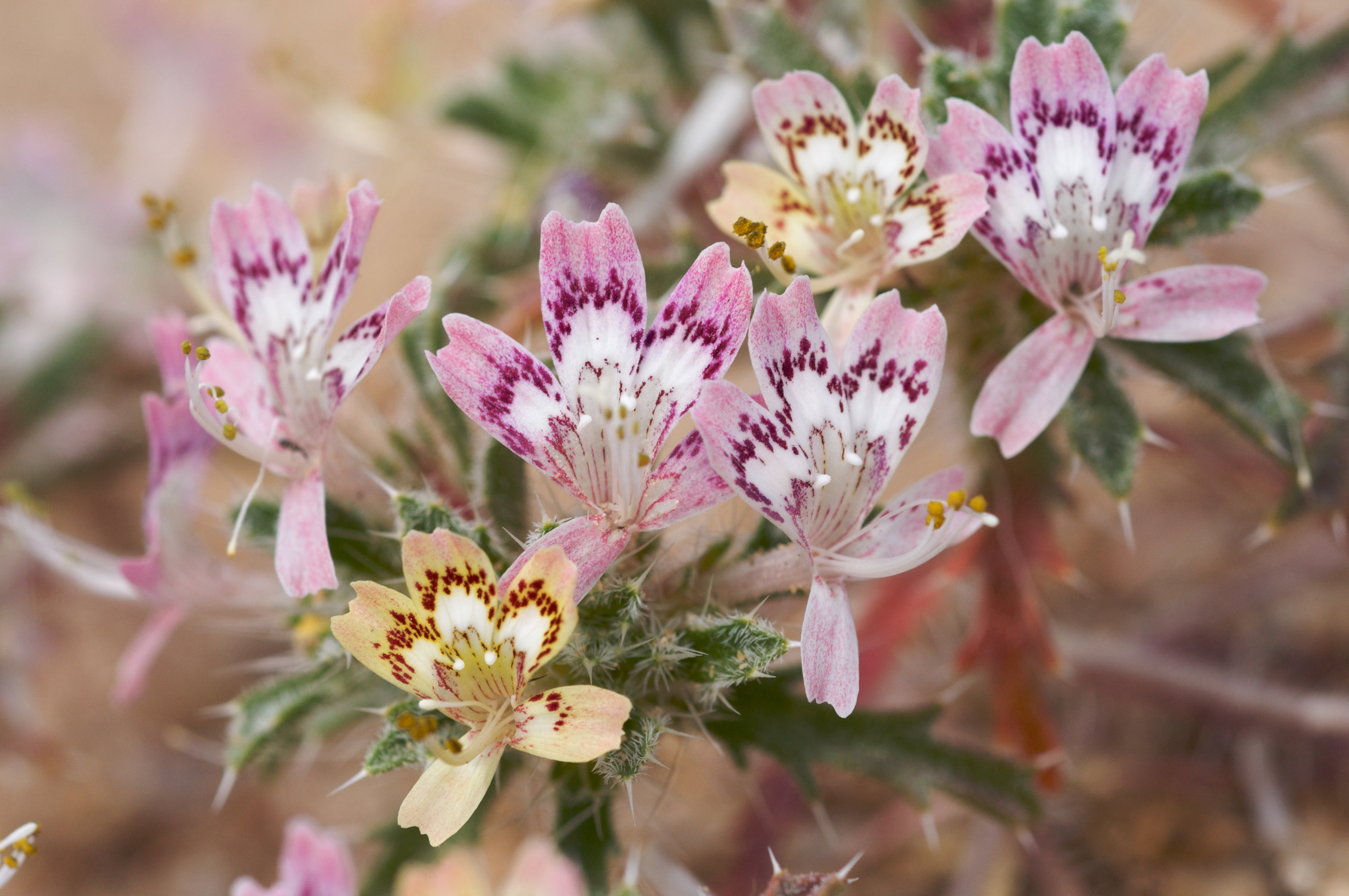
- Loeseliastrum matthewsii

Scientific classification
- Kingdom: Plantae
- Clade: Tracheophytes
- Clade: Angiosperms
- Clade: Eudicots
- Clade: Asterids
- Order: Ericales
- Family: Polemoniaceae
- Genus: Loeseliastrum (Brand) Timbrook (1986)

Species
- 4; see text

= Loeseliastrum =

Genus of flowering plants

Loeseliastrum (calico) is a small genus of flowering plants in the phlox family. It includes four species native to the southwestern United States (Arizona, California, Nevada, and Utah), northwestern Mexico, and Texas.

Four species are accepted.

- Loeseliastrum depressum (M.E.Jones ex A.Gray) J.M.Porter & L.A.Johnson - depressed ipomopsis
- Loeseliastrum franciscanum R.A.Crawford
- Loeseliastrum matthewsii (A.Gray) Timbrook - desert calico
- Loeseliastrum schottii (Torr.) Timbrook - Schott's calico
