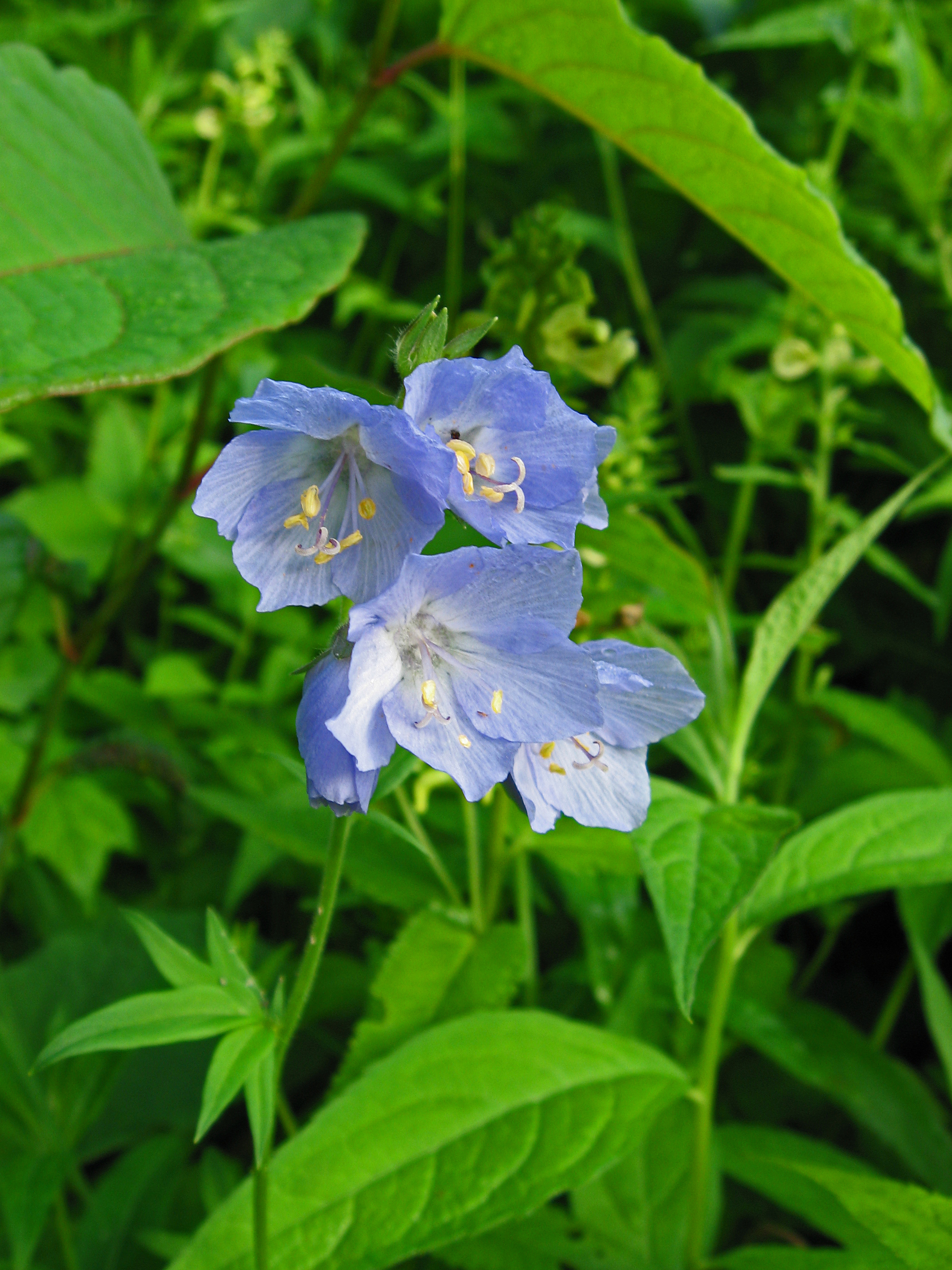
- Polemonium caeruleum (type species)

Scientific classification
- Kingdom: Plantae
- Clade: Tracheophytes
- Clade: Angiosperms
- Clade: Eudicots
- Clade: Asterids
- Order: Ericales
- Family: Polemoniaceae; Juss.

Genera
- 27; see text

= Polemoniaceae =

Family of flowering plants

The Polemoniaceae (Jacob's-ladder or phlox family) are a family of flowering plants consisting of about 27 genera with 270–400 species of annuals and perennials native to the Northern Hemisphere and South America, with the center of diversity in western North America.

Only one genus (Polemonium) is found in Europe, and two (Phlox and Polemonium) in Asia, where they are confined to cool temperate to arctic regions; both genera also occur more widely in North America, suggesting relatively recent colonization of the Old World from North America.

The family can be distinguished from most other eudicot families by the ovary made up of three fused carpels (usually with three chambers, but with one chamber in some species). The members of the family have five sepals, five petals fused, and five stamens that alternate with the lobes of the corolla.

For decades, most sources used a classification of the family published by Grant in 1959, but new evidence, including molecular phylogeny, veins of the corolla, pollen, and the flavonoids present, have led to reclassifications, such as the 1998 classification by Grant. It recognizes two subfamilies. The subfamily Cobaeoideae is tropical/subtropical and composed of six genera organized into five tribes. The subfamily Polemonioideae consists of 13 temperate genera. Grant divides it into three tribes, but with the disclaimer that it is not clear what the correct division is and that the genus classifications may be more useful in this subfamily.

== Human uses ==
A number are widely grown as ornamental plants, such as Ipomopsis aggregata (skyrocket or scarlet gilia), and many species of Phlox, Gilia and Polemonium. The kantuta (Cantua buxifolia) is the national flower of Bolivia and Peru.

== Genera ==
27 genera are accepted.

- Acanthogilia A.Day & R.C.Moran
- Aliciella Brand
- Allophyllum (Nutt.) A.D.Grant & V.E.Grant
- Bonplandia Cav.
- Bryantiella J.M.Porter
- Cantua Juss. ex Lam.
- Cobaea Cav.
- Collomia Nutt.
- Dayia J.M.Porter
- Eriastrum Wooton & Standl.
- Gilia Ruiz & Pav.
- Giliastrum (Brand) Rydb.
- Gymnosteris Greene
- Ipomopsis Michx.
- Langloisia Greene
- Lathrocasis L.A.Johnson
- Leptosiphon Benth.
- Linanthus Benth.
- Loeselia L.
- Loeseliastrum (Brand) Timbrook
- Maculigilia V.E.Grant
- Microgilia J.M.Porter & L.A.Johnson
- Microsteris Greene
- Navarretia Ruiz & Pav.
- Phlox L.
- Polemonium L.
- Saltugilia (V.E.Grant) L.A.Johnson

One extinct genus, Gilisenium, has been placed in the family based on an Early Eocene (Ypresian) fossil found in the Green River Formation of Utah.
