= Aliciella pentstemonoides =

Conservation status
- Imperiled (NatureServe)

Scientific classification
- Kingdom: Plantae
- Clade: Embryophytes
- Clade: Tracheophytes
- Clade: Angiosperms
- Clade: Eudicots
- Clade: Asterids
- Order: Ericales
- Family: Polemoniaceae
- Genus: Aliciella
- Species: A. pentstemonoides

Binomial name
- Aliciella pentstemonoides (M.E.Jones) J.M.Porter

Synonyms
- Gilia pentstemonoides

Plant species in the phlox family

Aliciella pentstemonoides, the Black Canyon gilia, is a rare species in the phlox family that only grows in the Gunnison River basin in western Colorado. It is a perennial plant with a very restricted habitat, only growing on rock outcrops and cliffs.

== Description ==
Black Canon gilia is a perennial species that flowers once before dying that can be short or long-lived. Its upright stems are covered in glandular hairs and only branch diffusely or somewhat like a thyrse when blooming; they reach heights of 5.5 to 18 centimeters (2–7 in). The roots of the plant have many branches.

The basal leaves take the form of a loose rosette, and can range from whole to being pinnatifid, once divided into a feathery or ferny shape; they measure 0.8-5.5 cm long with the central vein 1–8 mm wide. The leaves attached to the stems reduce in size upwards until they resemble bracts.

The bloom period is extended by a succession of short lived flowers, with a typical blooming season of June to August, but with occasional flowering as early as May or as late as September. The flowers are trumpet to nearly bell-shaped ranging from purple to lavender or occasionally almost white, often having a white to yellow center. They can be from 5 to 11 millimeters in length from base to the tips of the lobes, with five lobes that are shorter than the tube of the flower.

== Taxonomy ==
In 1893 the botanist Marcus E. Jones scientifically described a new species from Colorado that he named Gilia pentstemonoides, placing it in the genus Gilia. Jones collected the type specimen in the Black Canyon of the Gunnison in 1890. This classification continued until 1998 when James Mark Porter moved it to the genus Aliciella. Together with its genus Aliciella pentstemonoides is part of the Polemoniaceae family and has no subspecies.

In some sources the scientific name or its synonym are spelled Aliciella penstemonoides or Gilia penstemonoides, but Aliciella pentstemonoides is correct according to Plants of the World Online.

=== Names ===
Aliciella pentstemonoides is known by the common name Black Canyon gilia and beardtongue gilia.

== Range and habitat ==
Black canyon gilias are endemic to Colorado where it is known from just three western counties, Gunnison, Hinsdale, and Montrose. Its distribution is centered in Black Canyon of the Gunnison National Park and it grows in many canyons in the watershed of the Gunnison River. It is found at elevations of 2,130 to 2,900 meters (7,000–9,500 ft).

It is restricted to growing in rock crevices, on shelves, cliffs, and ledges, composed of gneiss, schist, or shale. The species is associated with black sagebrush, Rocky Mountain Douglas-fir and Rocky Mountain ponderosa pine forests, and spruce forests. Other plants on the canyon walls with Black Canyon gilia include Crandall's rockcress (Boechera crandallii), Fendler's sandwort (Arenaria fendleri), fringed sagebrush (Artemisia frigida), white sagebrush (Artemisia ludoviciana), hairy goldenaster (Heterotheca villosa), rock-spiraea (Holodiscus dumosus), little mountain-ricegrass (Piptatheropsis micrantha), wax currants (Ribes cereum), and lesser spikemoss (Selaginella densa). There are other species of ferns, mosses, and lichens in some areas.

=== Conservation ===
Black Canyon gilia was evaluated by NatureServe in 2025 and rated imperiled at the global and state level (G2, S2). In 2004 there were 28 known populations. By 2024 there were 21 occurrences with six that had not been documented in over 20 years and another six in good to excellent health. Two occurrences are thought to have been extirpated by the filling of Blue Mesa Reservoir in the 1960s. Although it grows in rocky, generally inaccessible areas the species faces threats from the Southwestern North American megadrought, recreation such as climbing, and competition from invasive species.
