= Boechera quebecensis =

Conservation status
- Critically Imperiled (NatureServe)

Scientific classification
- Kingdom: Plantae
- Clade: Tracheophytes
- Clade: Angiosperms
- Clade: Eudicots
- Clade: Rosids
- Order: Brassicales
- Family: Brassicaceae
- Genus: Boechera
- Species: B. quebecensis

Binomial name
- Boechera quebecensis Windham & Al-Shehbaz

Synonyms
- Arabis divaricarpa var. dechamplainii B.Boivin

Species of flowering plant

Boechera quebecensis, commonly known as the Quebec rockcress, is a critically imperiled herbaceous biennial or short-lived perennial flowering plant in the Brassicaceae family. It is endemic to limestone cliffs and escarpments of the Gaspé Peninsula in eastern Quebec, Canada.

== Description ==
Boechera quebecensis is a biennial or short-lived perennial that grows between 10 and 45 cm (3.9 and 17.7 in) tall. The basal leaves have oblanceolate leaf blades that are 5 to 15 mm (0.50 to 1.50 cm) wide, are finely toothed with hair-like protrusions up to 1 mm long on the leaf margins. The leaf blade surfaces are moderately pubescent (hairy), with 0.1 to 0.3 mm long trichomes; There are 4–15 cauline leaves per plant that do not overlap proximally, and the uppermost leaves are glabrous (smooth), with auricles 1–3 mm long.

The inflorescence is a raceme. The raceme is usually unbranched, and each raceme contains 11 to 41 flowers borne on horizontal (or slightly descending), mostly glabrous pedicels 3 to 14 mm (0.30 to 1.40 cm) long. The flowers have pubescent sepals that are a lavender or greenish colour, and glabrous white petals that are 6 to 7 mm long by 1 to 2 mm wide. The fruits are straight, secund, glabrous, and are 3 to 6 cm (30 to 60 mm) long by 1.5 to 2 mm wide. Similar to the flowers, the fruits are held horizontally on the plant. The seeds are 1.2 to 1.5 mm long by 1 to 1.3 mm wide, and are arranged in a single row or series. The seeds have wings 0.1 to 0.15 mm wide to aid in seed dispersal. The species primarily flowers from June to July.

It is likely that Boechera quebecensis arose from the hybridization of Boechera holboellii and Boechera stricta.

=== Similar species ===
Boechera quebecensis is very similar to a species named Boechera grahamii.

B. quebecensis differs from B. grahamii by having 4 to 15 non-overlapping cauline leaves, second fruits that are 3 to 6 cm (1.2 to 2.4 in) long, and 56–94 seeds per fruit. In contrast, B. grahamii has 10–52 proximally overlapping cauline leaves; fruits that are not secund, and are 5.5 to 9 cm long ; 84–146 seeds per fruit.

== Distribution and habitat ==
The Quebec rockcress is known from five locations across the Gaspé Peninsula. These locations are Cap du Corbeau, Rimouski (containing the largest extant subpopulation); La Muraille, Percé; Lac de la Falaise; Hâtée River, Rimouski; and Mont Saint-Alban, Forillon National Park (the smallest subpopulation, at three mature individuals).

Historically, Boechera quebecensis was also recorded at Îlet du Quai, Bic National Park; Anse à Doucet, Bic National Park; and Cap Bon-Ami, Forillon National Park. Recent attempts to find this species at those locations have all resulted in failure, and the species is considered Extirpated at Îlet du Quai.

=== Habitat ===
The species grows on limestone cliffs and escarpments at elevations 0 to 300 metres from sea level.

== Conservation ==
As of December 2024, the conservation group NatureServe listed Boechera quebecensis as critically imperiled (G1) worldwide. This status was last reviewed on 29 November 2018.

Rock climbing is the primary threat to Boechera quebecensis, due to the rock faces where this species grows being very friable. Climate change also potentially threatens this species by encouraging the expansion of forest cover in arctic-alpine regions.

== Taxonomy ==
Boechera quebecensis was first named and described by Michael D. Windham and Ihsan Ali Al-Shehbaz in 2007 in volume 12 of the journal Harvard Papers in Botany.

=== Etymology ===
The species epithet quebecensis means "of Quebec". In English, the species is commonly known as the Quebec Rockcress, and in French the species is known as Arabette du Québec.
