= A. formosa =

A. formosa may refer to:

- Aliciella formosa, a phlox endemic to New Mexico
- Amandava formosa, an estrildid finch
- Anas formosa, a dabbling duck
- Angaria formosa, a sea snail
- Aplysiopsis formosa, a sea slug
- Aquilegia formosa, a wildflower native to western North America
- Aranea formosa, an orb-web spider
