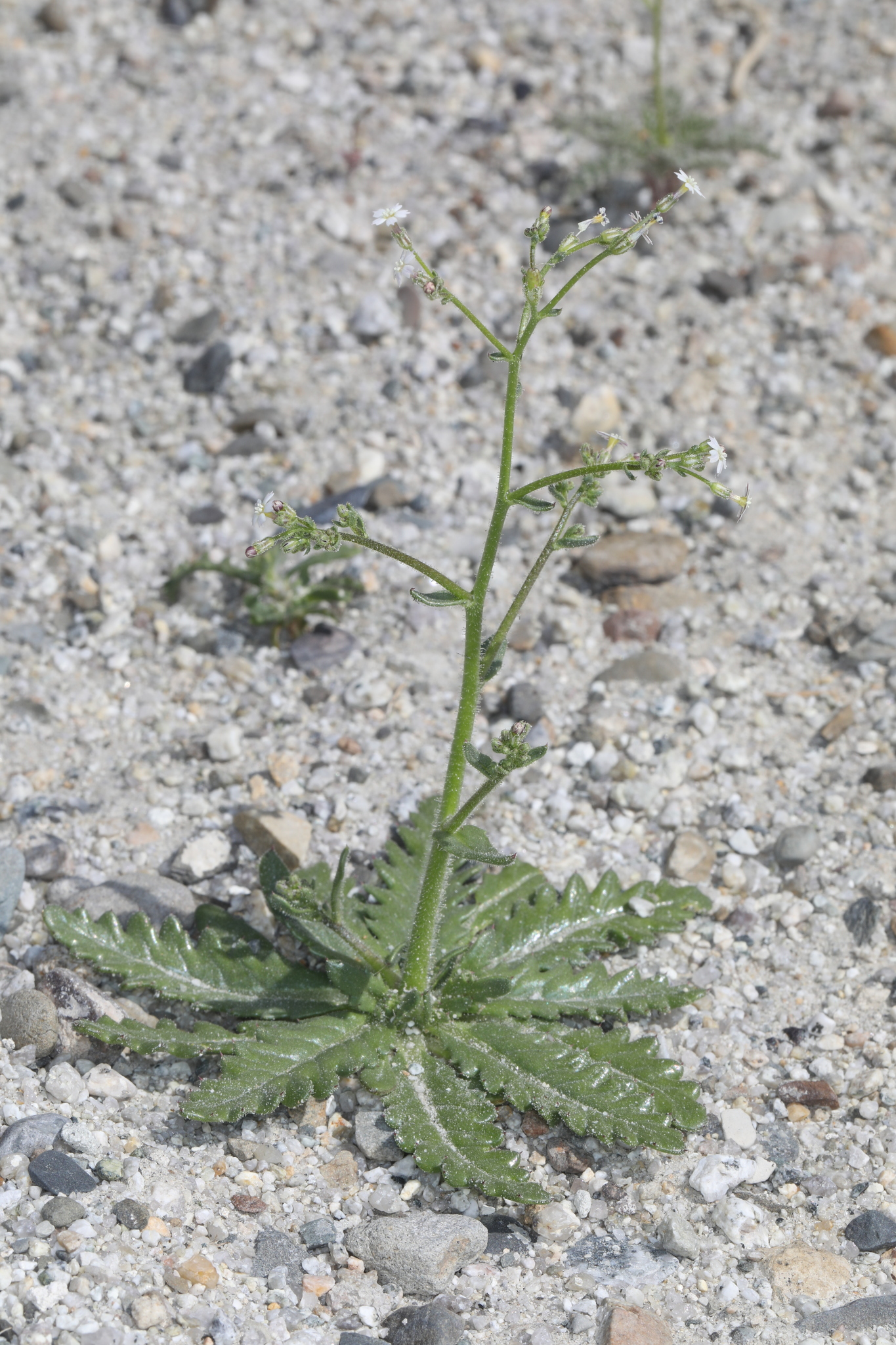
- Upper Owens Valley, Inyo County, California

Conservation status
- Secure (NatureServe)

Scientific classification
- Kingdom: Plantae
- Clade: Tracheophytes
- Clade: Angiosperms
- Clade: Eudicots
- Clade: Asterids
- Order: Ericales
- Family: Polemoniaceae
- Genus: Aliciella
- Species: A. triodon

Binomial name
- Aliciella triodon (Eastw.) Brand

Synonyms
- Gilia leptomeria var. tridentata; Gilia triodon

= Aliciella triodon =

Plant species in the phlox family

Aliciella triodon (formerly Gilia triodon) is a species of flowering plant in the phlox family known by the common name coyote gilia. It is native to the American desert southwest from California to New Mexico, where it grows in desert habitat such as scrub and woodland. This small herb produces a thin, glandular stem not more than about 13 centimeters tall. The stem is surrounded by a basal rosette of fleshy, sharp-lobed leaves each up to 2 centimeters long. There are sometimes smaller, unlobed leaves on the stem itself. The inflorescence is a solitary flower or loose array of two or three flowers each about 5 to 7 millimeters wide. Each flower has a hair-thin tubular throat opening into a whitish corolla. The corolla lobes each have three distinct teeth.

== Taxonomy ==
Aliciella triodon was scientifically described in 1893 by Alice Eastwood, but as a species in the genus Gilia. It was moved to Aliciella by August Brand in 1905. Together with its genus it is classified in the Polemoniaceae family. The species has one other botanical synonym from being described as a variety of Gilia leptomeria named tridentata by Marcus E. Jones in 1895.

== Range ==
Aliciella triodon is native to eight western US states, Oregon, California, Nevada, Idaho, Utah, Arizona, New Mexico, and Colorado.
