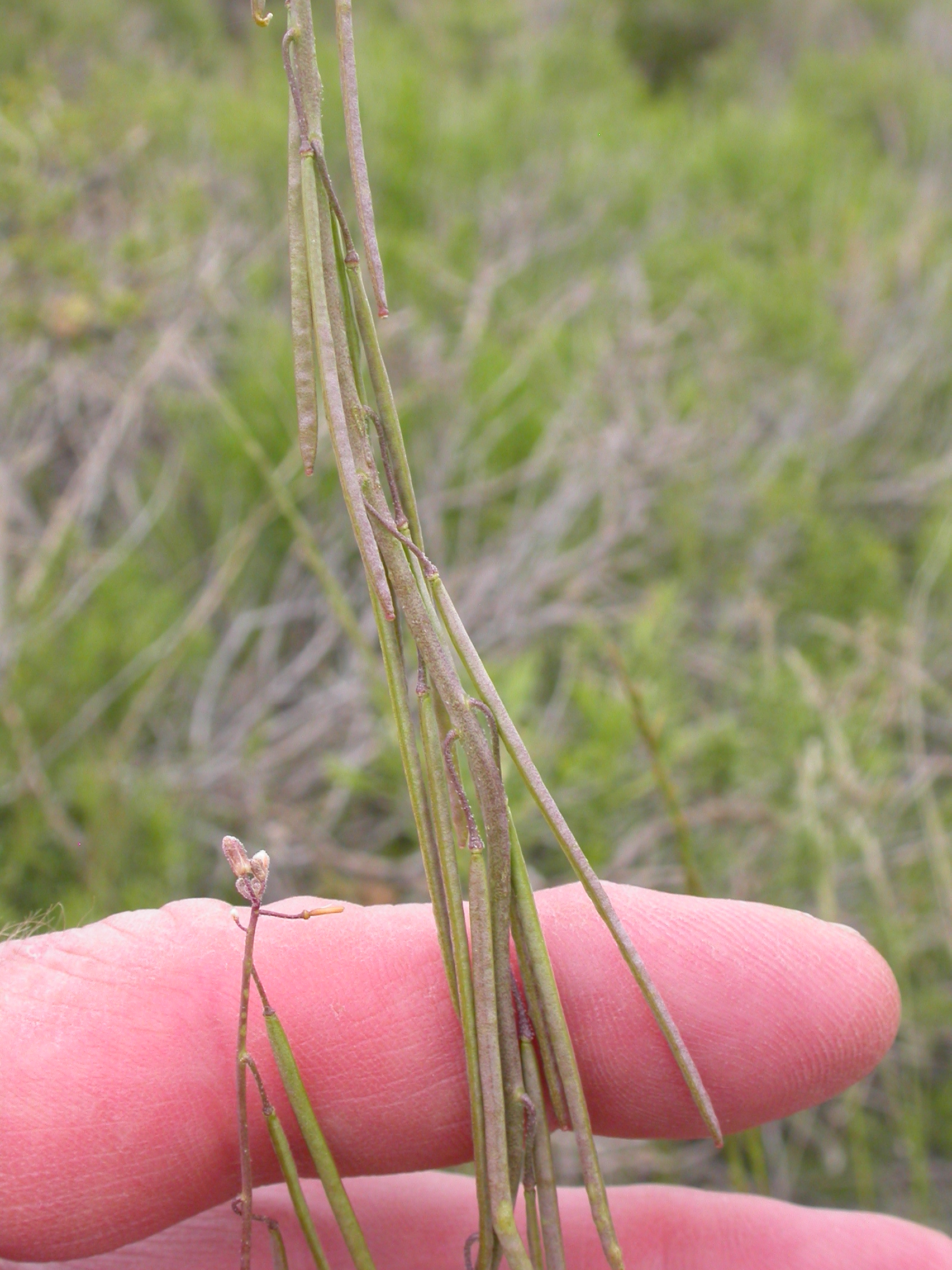
- Boechera retrofracta showing semi-ripe siliques

Scientific classification
- Kingdom: Plantae
- Clade: Tracheophytes
- Clade: Angiosperms
- Clade: Eudicots
- Clade: Rosids
- Order: Brassicales
- Family: Brassicaceae
- Genus: Boechera
- Species: B. retrofracta

Binomial name
- Boechera retrofracta (Graham) A.& D. Lvve, 1982

Synonyms
- Arabis arcuata var. secunda B.L.Rob.; Arabis caduca A.Nelson; Arabis exilis A.Nelson; Arabis holboellii var. retrofracta Rydb.; Arabis holboellii var. secunda (Howell) Jeps.; Arabis kochii Blank.; Arabis lignipes A.Nelson; Arabis retrofracta Graham; Arabis retrofracta var. multicaulis B.Boivin; Arabis rhodantha Greene; Arabis secunda Howell; Arabis sparsiflora subsp. secunda Piper; Arabis sparsiflora var. secunda (Howell) Piper; Arabis tenuis Greene

= Boechera retrofracta =

Species of flowering plant

Boechera retrofracta is a species of flowering plant in family Brassicaceae. The common names include reflexed rockcress.

== Description ==
Boechera retrofracta is a biennial or short-lived perennial species. The plants typically have single stems 1.5 to 7 dm (sometimes to 10.5 dm) tall. The basal leaves are densely pubescent, oblanceolate shaped, 2 to 7 mm wide, with entire margins or shallowly dentate. The flowers are arranged into a usually unbranched raceme with 15 to 80 flowers but sometimes having as many as 140. The flowers are pendent and the petals are white to lavender. The fruits (siliques) are strongly reflexed (pendulous or pendent), usually appressed to rachis at maturity. The seeds have narrowly winged margins. Flowering in April through until August. Chromosomes: 2n=14.

== Habitat ==
Boechera retrofracta was listed as a threatened species in Minnesota in 1984 because of its rarity and the small size of its populations. In Minnesota populations are found in the Boundary Water Canoe Area in crevices on dry, north-and east-facing diabase cliffs, in association with other rare plants like: Physematium scopulinum (Rocky Mountain woodsia) and Asplenium trichomanes ssp. trichomanes (maidenhair spleenwort). There are also populations is Kittson county in dry prairie and sand dune habitat in association with xerophytes such as Juniperus horizontalis (creeping juniper), Orthocarpus luteus (owl clover), and Houstonia longifolia (bluets). It has also been found in bur oak savanna. In California it is found growing on rock outcrops, in sandy soil, in grasslands and sagebrush steppes, and in open conifer forests.

== Distribution ==
Boechera retrofracta occurs in California, Alaska, western Canada, Colorado, Minnesota.
