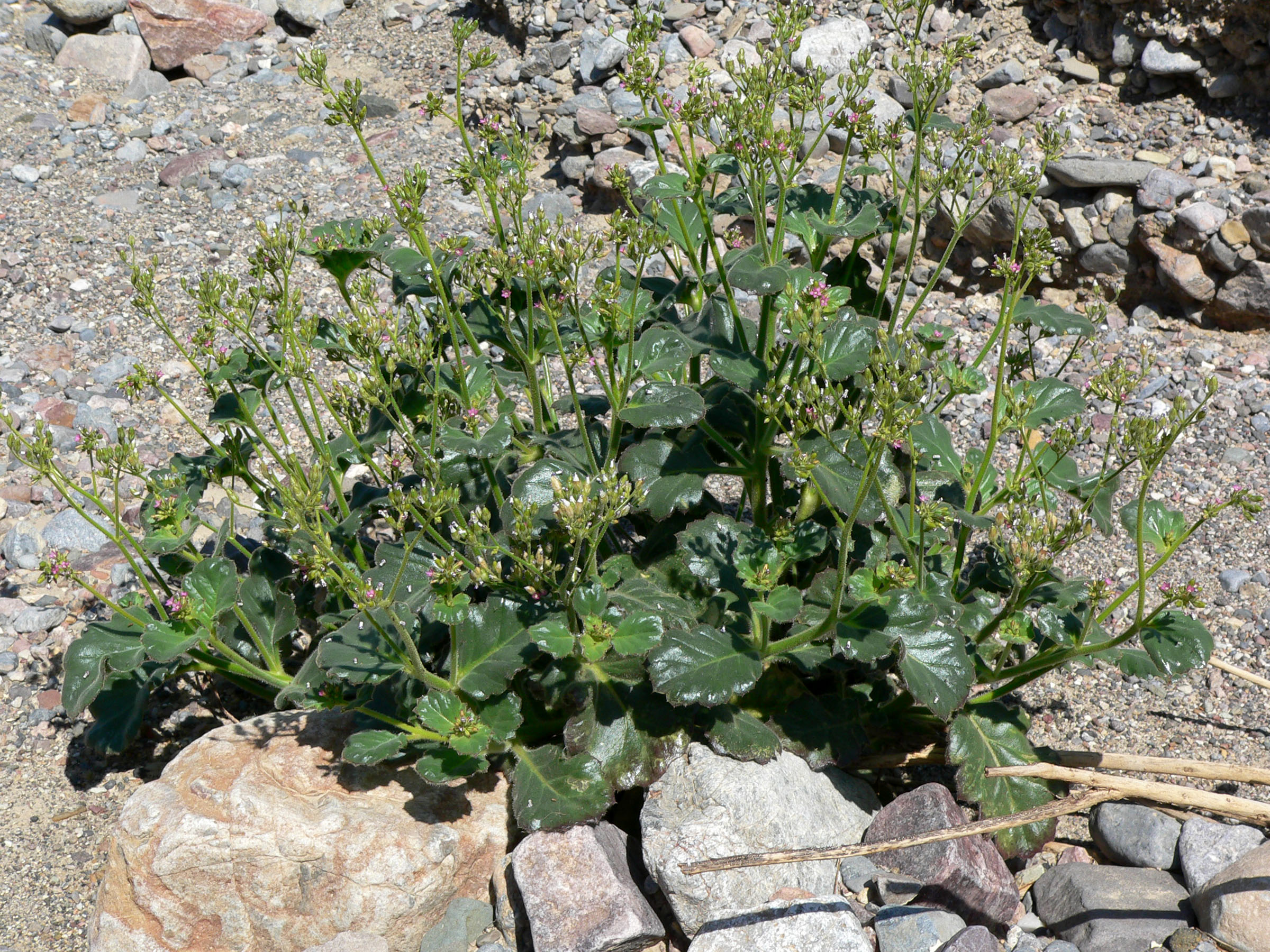
- Aliciella latifolia in Furnace Creek Wash, Death Valley, California

Conservation status
- Apparently Secure (NatureServe)

Scientific classification
- Kingdom: Plantae
- Clade: Tracheophytes
- Clade: Angiosperms
- Clade: Eudicots
- Clade: Asterids
- Order: Ericales
- Family: Polemoniaceae
- Genus: Aliciella
- Species: A. latifolia

Binomial name
- Aliciella latifolia (S.Watson) J.M.Porter

Synonyms
- Gilia latifolia S.Watson; Navarretia latifolia (S.Watson) Kuntze

= Aliciella latifolia =

Species of flowering plant

Aliciella latifolia (formerly Gilia latifolia), also known as broad-leaved gilia, is a foul smelling annual plant in the Phlox family (Polemoniaceae) found in deserts of the southwestern United States.

== Habitat and range ==
It grows in the eastern and northern Mojave Desert and Colorado Desert. It is common in desert dry washes and on rocky hillsides below 2,000', and in creosote bush scrub, especially where there is desert varnish.

== Growth pattern ==
It is an annual growing from 4" to 12" tall.

== Leaves ==
Leaves are simple, leathery, and ovate to round, with toothed margins sometimes tinged with pink to red. Leaves are unusual with broad holly-like leaves, compared to its relatives which have pinnately divided leaves.

== Flowers ==
Flowers have five sepals, five petals fused into a narrow, funnel-shaped, corolla tube. Its five stamens alternate with the lobes of the corolla. Flowers occur in a cluster at the end of the stems. The outside of the corolla is pale pink to tan, and the inside is pink to bright red, with stamens of unequal length that barely protrude past the corolla.

== Fruits ==
Fruits are capsules with 3-compartments, each having many reddish-brown seeds.
