= Boechera falcatoria =

Conservation status
- Critically Imperiled (NatureServe)

Scientific classification
- Kingdom: Plantae
- Clade: Tracheophytes
- Clade: Angiosperms
- Clade: Eudicots
- Clade: Rosids
- Order: Brassicales
- Family: Brassicaceae
- Genus: Boechera
- Species: B. falcatoria

Binomial name
- Boechera falcatoria (Rollins) Dorn

Synonyms
- Arabis falcatoria

Species of plant

Boechera falcatoria (formerly Arabis falcatoria) is a rare species of flowering plant in the family Brassicaceae known by the common name Grouse Creek rockcress. It is endemic to Utah in the United States, where it is known only from Box Elder County. It has been reported from neighboring Nevada, but these reports are likely based on misidentifications.

== Description ==
This perennial herb produces several stems up to 20 to 30 centimeters tall from a caudex. The lower part of the stem and the basal leaves are hairy. The inflorescence is a raceme of 6 to 15 flowers with white or lavender petals. The fruit is a curving, sickle-shaped silique up to 6.5 centimeters in length.

This plant grows on open rocky outcrops in sand and gravel.

This species is known from a few collections and little else is known about its abundance.
