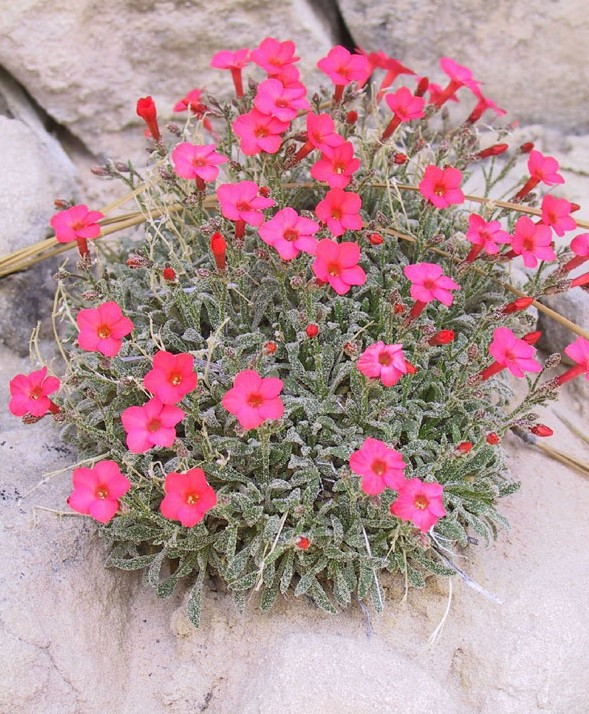
- Aliciella caespitosa

Scientific classification
- Kingdom: Plantae
- Clade: Embryophytes
- Clade: Tracheophytes
- Clade: Spermatophytes
- Clade: Angiosperms
- Clade: Eudicots
- Clade: Asterids
- Order: Ericales
- Family: Polemoniaceae
- Genus: Aliciella; Brand (1905)

Species
- 23; see text

= Aliciella =

Genus of flowering plants

Aliciella is a genus of plants in the phlox family. It includes 23 species native to the western United States and northwestern Mexico. These plants have been treated as members of genus Gilia until recently, when it was proposed they be moved back to Aliciella. This genus was created in 1905 to include certain gilias that seemed distinct from most of the others, but it was abandoned soon after. Later genetic analyses suggest it should be revived.

The genus was named in honor of Canadian-American botanist Alice Eastwood, who is credited with discovering the first plant in this genus.

== Species ==
23 species are accepted.

- Aliciella caespitosa (A.Gray) J.M.Porter - Rabbit Valley gilia
- Aliciella cliffordii J.M.Porter
- Aliciella formosa (Greene ex Brand) J.M.Porter - Aztec gilia
- Aliciella haydenii (A.Gray) J.M.Porter - San Juan gilia
- Aliciella heterostyla (S.Cochrane & A.G.Day) J.M.Porter - cactus flat gilia
- Aliciella humillima (Brand) J.M.Porter
- Aliciella hutchinsifolia (Rydb.) J.M.Porter - desert pale gilia
- Aliciella latifolia (S.Watson) J.M.Porter - broad-leaved gilia
- Aliciella leptomeria (A.Gray) J.M.Porter - sand gilia
- Aliciella lottiae (A.Gray) J.M.Porter - Lott's gilia
- Aliciella mcvickerae (M.E.Jones) J.M.Porter
- Aliciella micromeria (A.Gray) J.M.Porter - dainty gilia
- Aliciella monoensis J.M.Porter & A.G.Day
- Aliciella nyensis (Reveal) J.M.Porter - Nye gilia
- Aliciella penstemonoides (M.E.Jones) J.M.Porter - Black Canyon gilia
- Aliciella pinnatifida (Nutt. ex A.Gray) J.M.Porter - sticky gilia
- Aliciella ripleyi (Barneby) J.M.Porter - Ripley's gilia
- Aliciella sedifolia (Brandegee) J.M.Porter - stonecrop gilia
- Aliciella stenothyrsa (A.Gray) J.M.Porter
- Aliciella subacaulis (Rydb.) J.M.Porter & L.A.Johnson - pinyon gilia
- Aliciella subnuda (Torr. ex A.Gray) J.M.Porter - coral gilia
- Aliciella tenuis (F.J.Sm. & Neese) J.M.Porter - Mussentuchit Creek gilia
- Aliciella triodon (Eastw.) Brand - coyote gilia

Genus Aliciella was named for the botanist Alice Eastwood.
