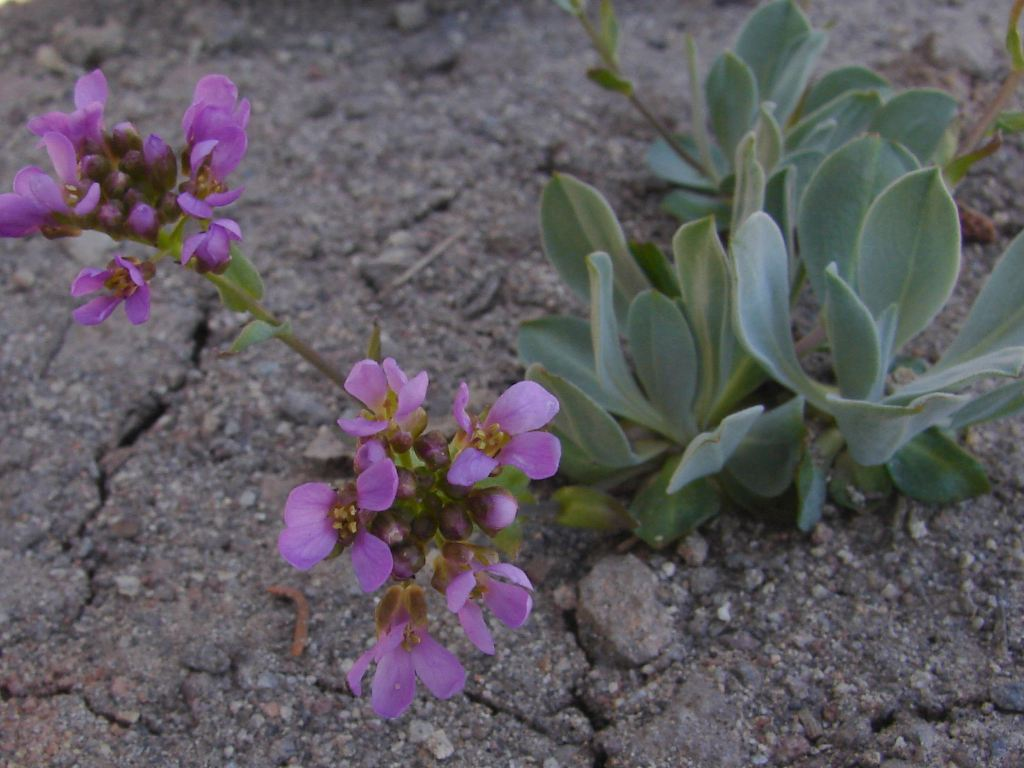

Scientific classification
- Kingdom: Plantae
- Clade: Tracheophytes
- Clade: Angiosperms
- Clade: Eudicots
- Clade: Rosids
- Order: Brassicales
- Family: Brassicaceae
- Genus: Boechera
- Species: B. lemmonii

Binomial name
- Boechera lemmonii (S.Watson) W.A.Weber

Synonyms
- Arabis bracteolata Greene; Arabis canescens var. latifolia S.Watson; Arabis codyi G.A.Mulligan; Arabis egglestonii Rydb.; Arabis kennedyi Greene; Arabis latifolia (S.Watson) Piper; Arabis lemmonii S.Watson (1889) (basionym); Arabis lemmonii var. typica Rollins; Arabis oreocallis Greene; Arabis polyclada Greene; Arabis semisepulta Greene

= Boechera lemmonii =

Species of plant

Boechera lemmonii is a species of flowering plant in the family Brassicaceae known by the common name Lemmon's rockcress. It is native to western North America from Alaska to California to Colorado, where it grows in a number of rocky habitat types.

== Description ==
This is a perennial herb growing many small stems from a branching, hairy caudex. The slender stems rest against the ground or are somewhat upright, reaching up to 20 centimeters in length. The caudex is surrounded by a rosette of hairy leaves one or two centimeters long. There are a few smaller leaves along the stem as well. The inflorescence bears pink to purple flowers which yield narrow siliques up to 4 centimeters long containing round, winged seeds.
