= Boechera ophira =

Conservation status
- Critically Imperiled (NatureServe)

Scientific classification
- Kingdom: Plantae
- Clade: Tracheophytes
- Clade: Angiosperms
- Clade: Eudicots
- Clade: Rosids
- Order: Brassicales
- Family: Brassicaceae
- Genus: Boechera
- Species: B. ophira

Binomial name
- Boechera ophira (Rollins) Al-Shehbaz

Synonyms
- Arabis ophira

Species of flowering plant

Boechera ophira (formerly Arabis ophira) is a rare species of flowering plant in the mustard family known by the common name Ophir Pass rockcress, or Ophir rockcress. It is endemic to Nevada in the United States, where it is known from Nye and Lander Counties. It grows on the crest of the Toiyabe Range.

This long-lived perennial herb produces hairy stems up to 14 centimeters tall from a woody caudex. There are narrow, hairy leaves around the stem bases and a few higher on the stems. The inflorescence is a raceme of 6 to 15 flowers with purple petals. The fruit is a straight silique up to 4 centimeters long.

This plant grows in subalpine climates at the crest of the Toiyabe mountain range on clay soils covered in loose quartzite scree. It grows in sagebrush habitat alongside Artemisia arbuscula, Leptodactylon pungens, and various grasses.

There are only five known occurrences of this plant, for a total of fewer than 200 individuals. The habitat is rugged and difficult to explore so more plants may exist.
