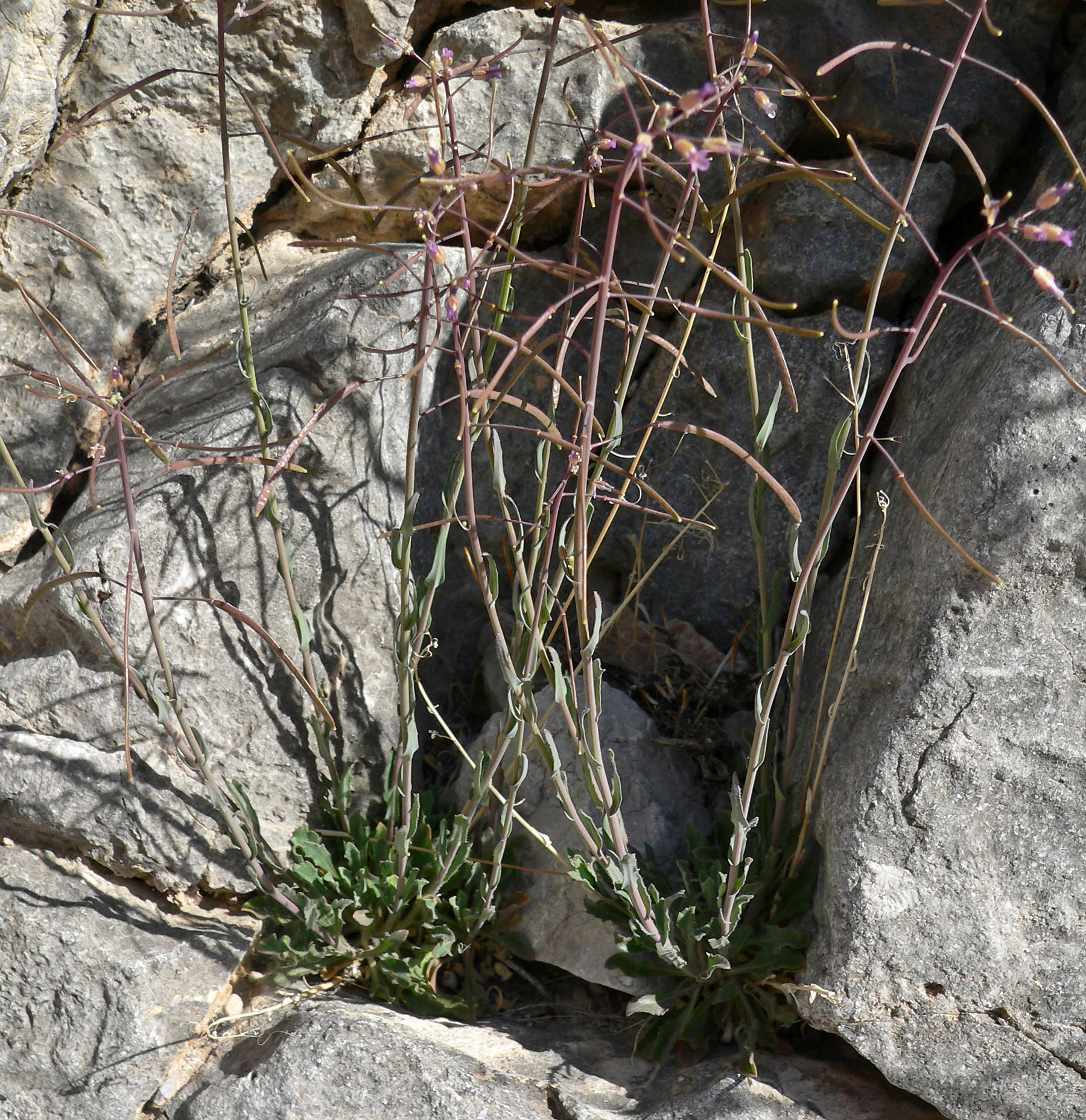
- March bloom, Spring Mountains, Nevada

Scientific classification
- Kingdom: Plantae
- Clade: Tracheophytes
- Clade: Angiosperms
- Clade: Eudicots
- Clade: Rosids
- Order: Brassicales
- Family: Brassicaceae
- Genus: Boechera
- Species: B. perennans

Binomial name
- Boechera perennans (S.Watson) W.A.Weber

Synonyms
- Arabis perennans

= Boechera perennans =

Species of flowering plant

Boechera perennans is a species of rockcress known as perennial rockcress. It is native to the southwestern United States and northern Mexico. It is a perennial herb growing up to 28 in (71 cm) tall. The basal leaves are hairy and often toothed, while the scattered upper leaves are up to 4 cm (1.6 in) long. Toward the top of the stem are small widely spaced purple or pink-purple flowers on long, thin stalks. These give way to the fruits, which are siliques: long, very narrow pods up to 6 centimeters long.
