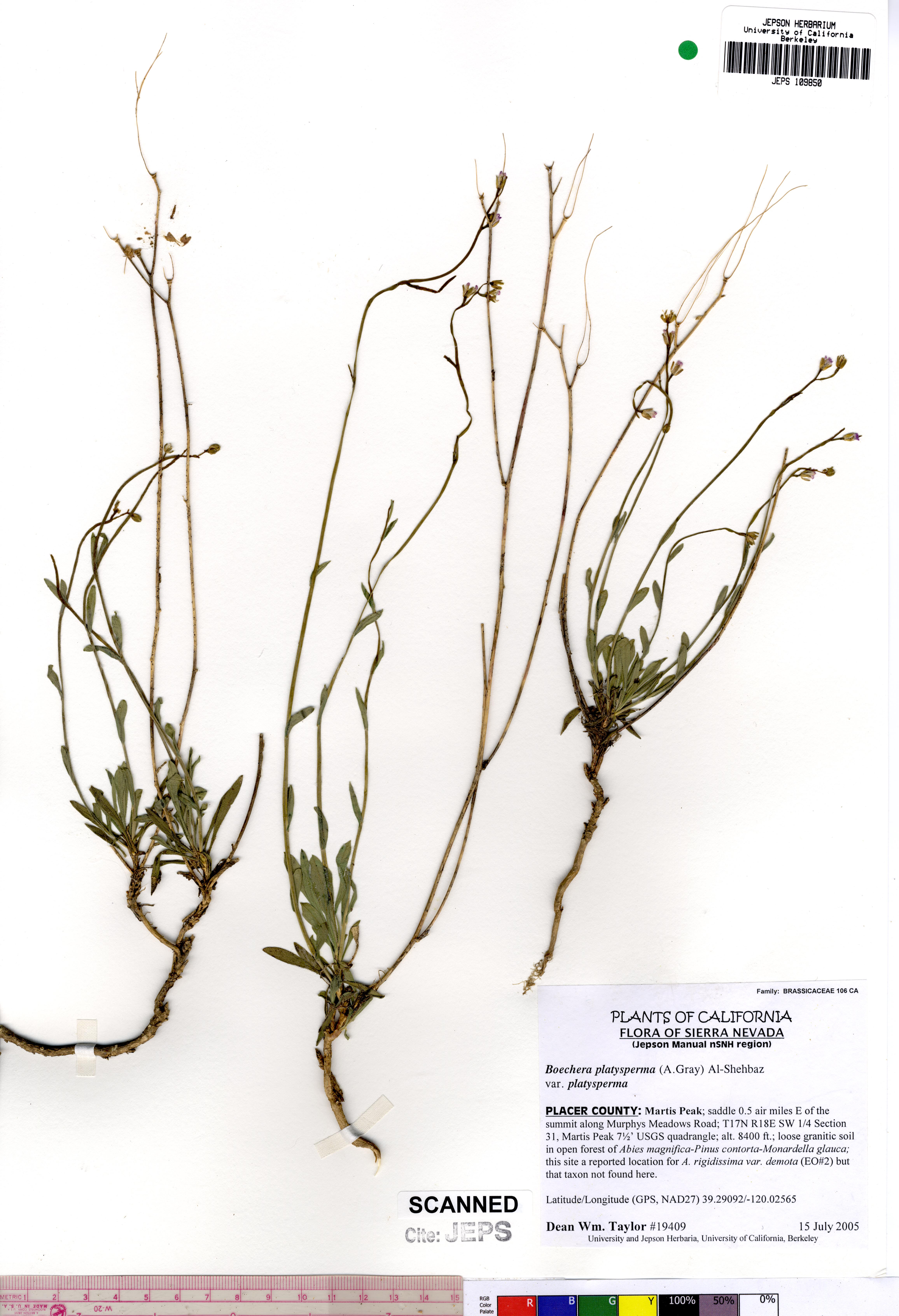

Scientific classification
- Kingdom: Plantae
- Clade: Tracheophytes
- Clade: Angiosperms
- Clade: Eudicots
- Clade: Rosids
- Order: Brassicales
- Family: Brassicaceae
- Genus: Boechera
- Species: B. platysperma

Binomial name
- Boechera platysperma (A.Gray) Al-Shehbaz

Synonyms
- Arabis platysperma A.Gray

= Boechera platysperma =

Species of flowering plant

Boechera platysperma, the pioneer rockcress or broad-seeded rock-cress, is a perennial plant in the family Brassicaceae found in western United States mountains.

It is less than 12 inches (30 cm) tall.

== Habitat and range ==
It can be found on dry, rocky flats and slopes, from 4,000 to 12,000 feet (1,200 to 3,700 m), in mountain ranges including the United States Sierra Nevada range, California's North Coast range, Cascade Range, and ranges in the Great Basin.

== Leaves and stems ==
Leaves are entire.

== Inflorescence and fruit ==
Flowers are 4-petaled and spoon shaped. Seed pods are flat.
