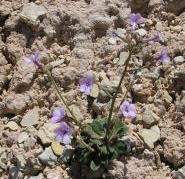

Conservation status
- Critically Imperiled (NatureServe)

Scientific classification
- Kingdom: Plantae
- Clade: Tracheophytes
- Clade: Angiosperms
- Clade: Eudicots
- Clade: Asterids
- Order: Ericales
- Family: Polemoniaceae
- Genus: Aliciella
- Species: A. tenuis

Binomial name
- Aliciella tenuis (F.G.Sm. & Neese) J.M.Porter

= Aliciella tenuis =

Species of flowering plant

Aliciella tenuis (syn. Gilia tenuis) is a rare species of flowering plant in the phlox family known by the common name Mussentuchit gilia, or Mussentuchit Creek gilia. It is endemic to Utah in the United States, where it occurs only in the San Rafael Swell.

This plant is a perennial herb growing up to 15 centimeters tall. The basal leaves are divided into lobes. The herbage is coated in glandular hairs that often have sand stuck to them. The flowers are pale blue and appear in May through July.

This species grows in rocky, sandy habitat, such as sandstone outcrops and talus slopes.

The rare plant faces a number of threats, including petroleum exploration, off-road vehicle use, sand and gravel mining, road maintenance, poaching, pesticides, livestock grazing and trampling, introduced species of plants, and climate change.
