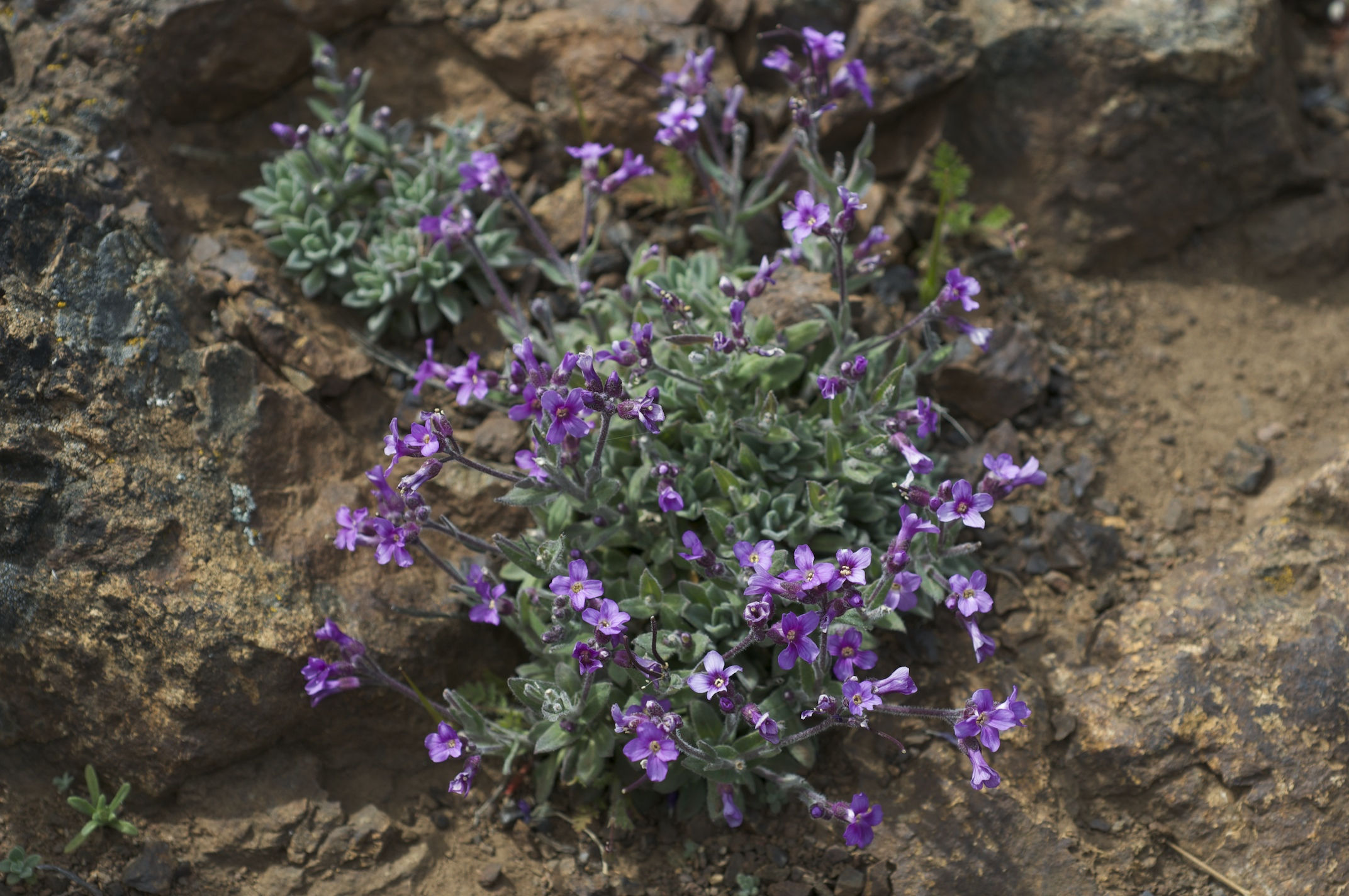

Scientific classification
- Kingdom: Plantae
- Clade: Tracheophytes
- Clade: Angiosperms
- Clade: Eudicots
- Clade: Rosids
- Order: Brassicales
- Family: Brassicaceae
- Genus: Boechera
- Species: B. breweri

Binomial name
- Boechera breweri (S.Watson) Al-Shehbaz

= Boechera breweri =

Species of flowering plant

Boechera breweri is a species of flowering plant in the family Brassicaceae known by the common name Brewer's rockcress.

== Distribution ==
The plant is native to northern California and southern Oregon.

It grows in rocky areas in mountains and valleys, including in the northern Sierra Nevada and the Klamath Mountains.

== Description ==
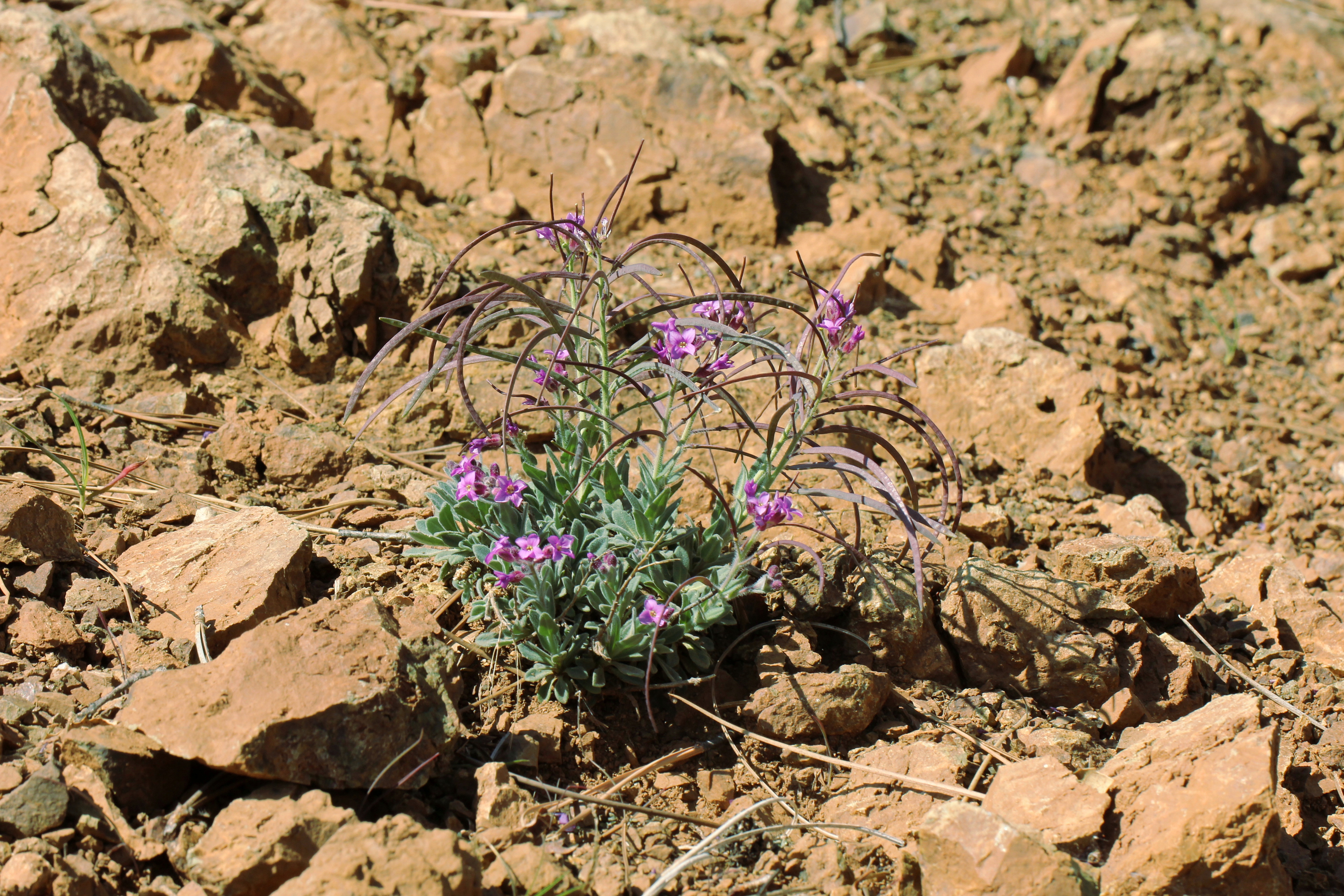
Boechera brewer

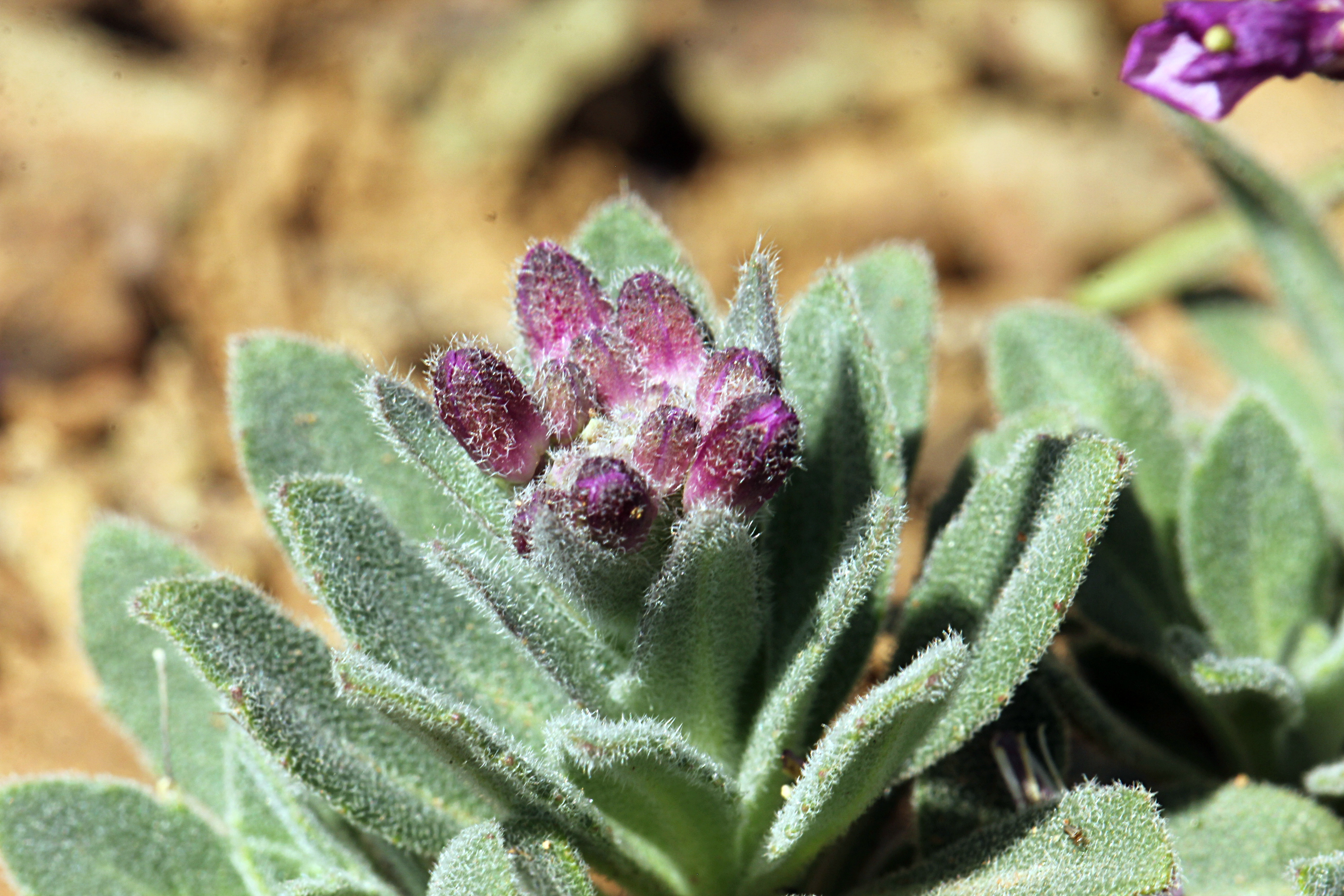
Foliage

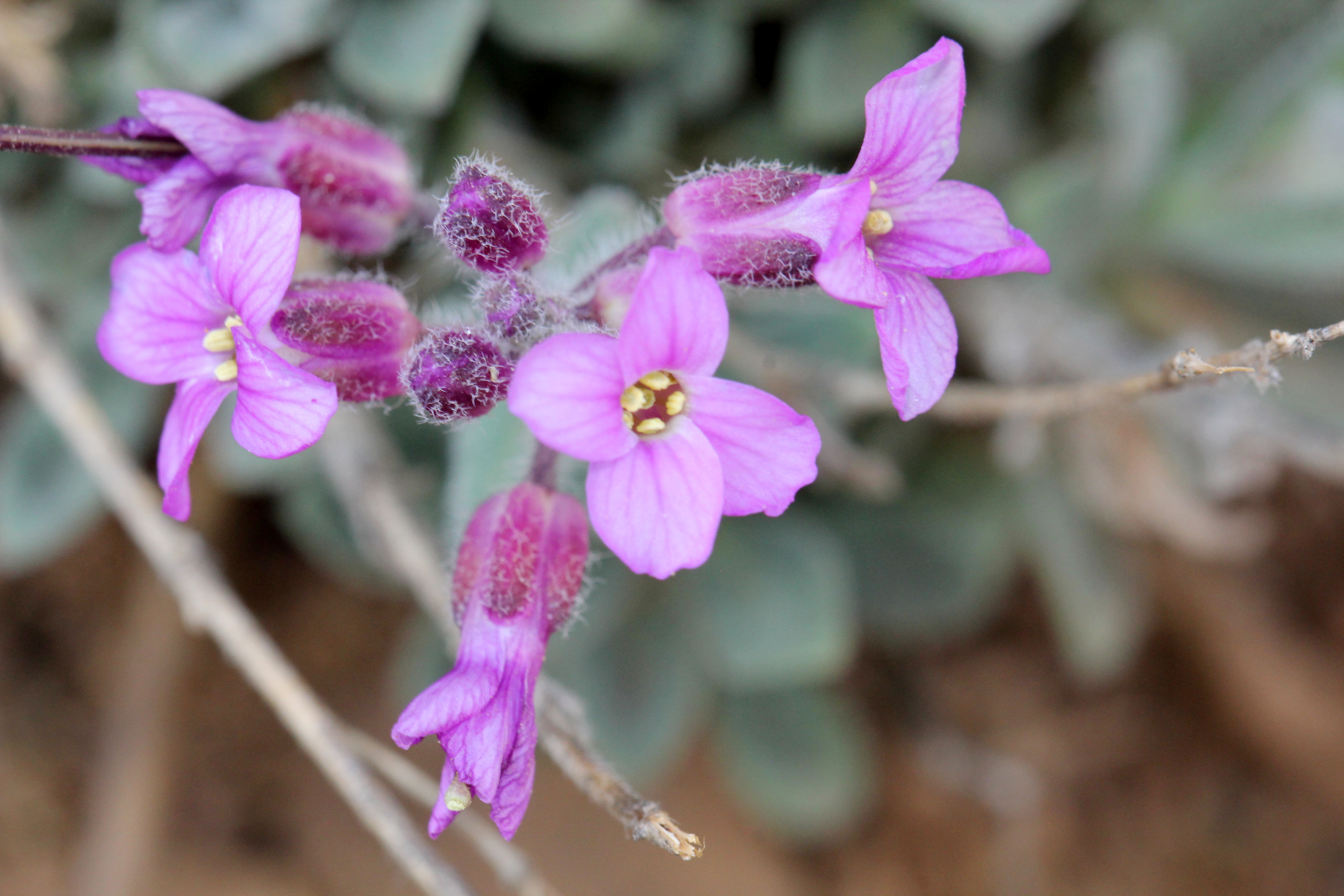
Flowers

Boechera breweri is a perennial herb growing from a woody, branching caudex. It produces hairy, upright stems up to about 20 centimeters tall. There is a basal clump of leaves around the caudex. They are oval-shaped and up to 3 centimeters long. They are coated in forked hairs. There are also a few leaves higher up the plant with bases that clasp the stem.

The flowers have dark purple sepals and lighter purple petals. The fruit is a long, thin, ascending silique up to 6.5 centimeters long. The flowers have thick pinkish-purple sepals and spoon-shaped pink to purple petals.

The fruit is a long, narrow, purple silique which may be many centimeters long.
