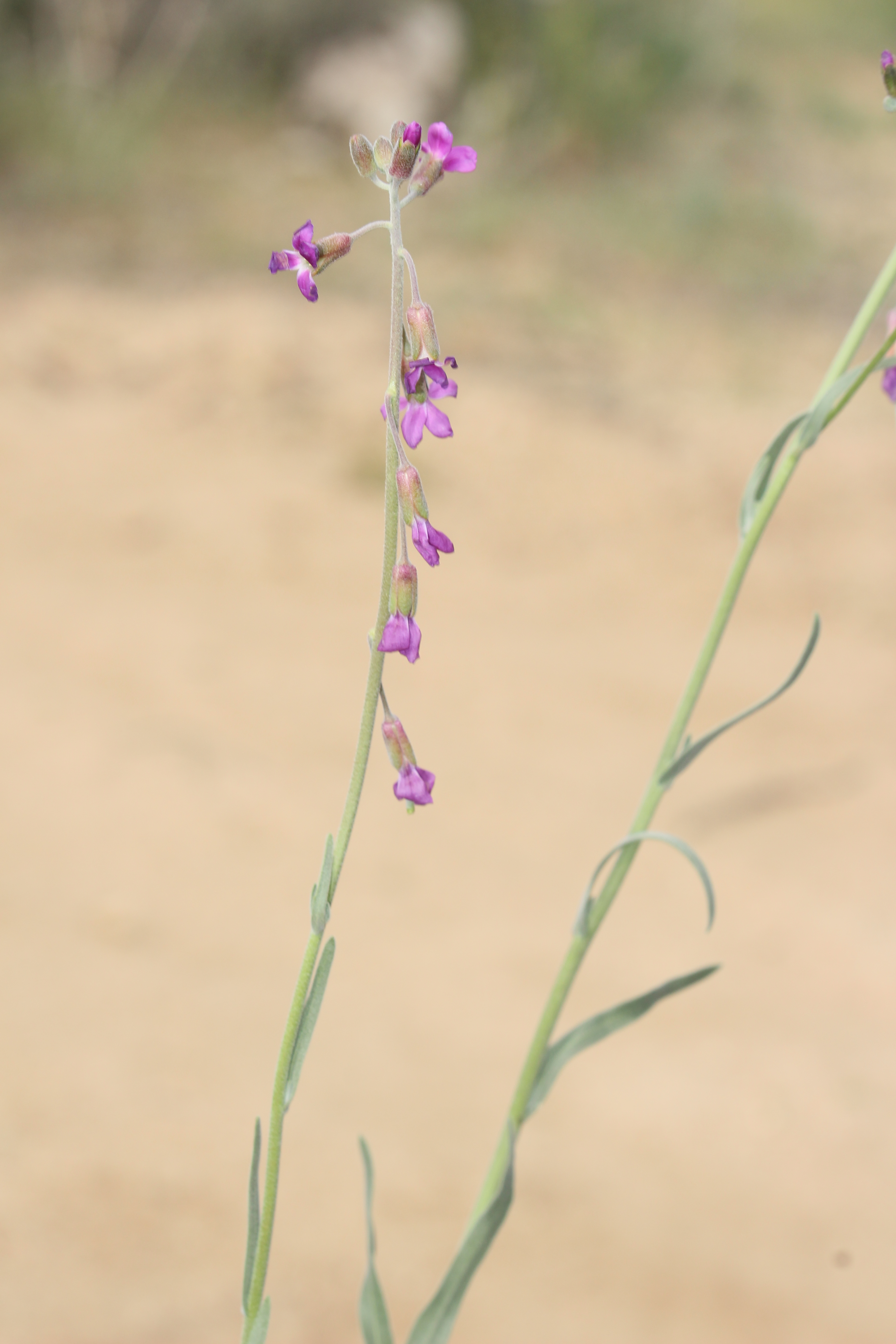

Scientific classification
- Kingdom: Plantae
- Clade: Tracheophytes
- Clade: Angiosperms
- Clade: Eudicots
- Clade: Rosids
- Order: Brassicales
- Family: Brassicaceae
- Genus: Boechera
- Species: B. pulchra

Binomial name
- Boechera pulchra (M.E.Jones ex S.Watson) W.A.Weber

Synonyms
- Arabis pulchra M.E.Jones ex S.Watson

= Boechera pulchra =

Species of flowering plant

Boechera pulchra, the beautiful rockcress, is a perennial plant in the mustard family (Brassicaceae) found in the Mojave Desert and other dry regions of southern and eastern California and Nevada, and the Colorado Plateau and Canyonlands region of the southwestern United States, mostly below 8,000 feet (2,400 m) elevation.

== Description ==
A long-lived perennial, it is usually 300–750 mm (12–30 in) tall from a woody base. Eight to twenty purple, rarely white, flowers are borne in a normally unbranched raceme. Petals are 9–16 mm (0.4–0.6 in) long and 2–5 mm (0.08–0.20 in) wide. Sepals are hairy.
