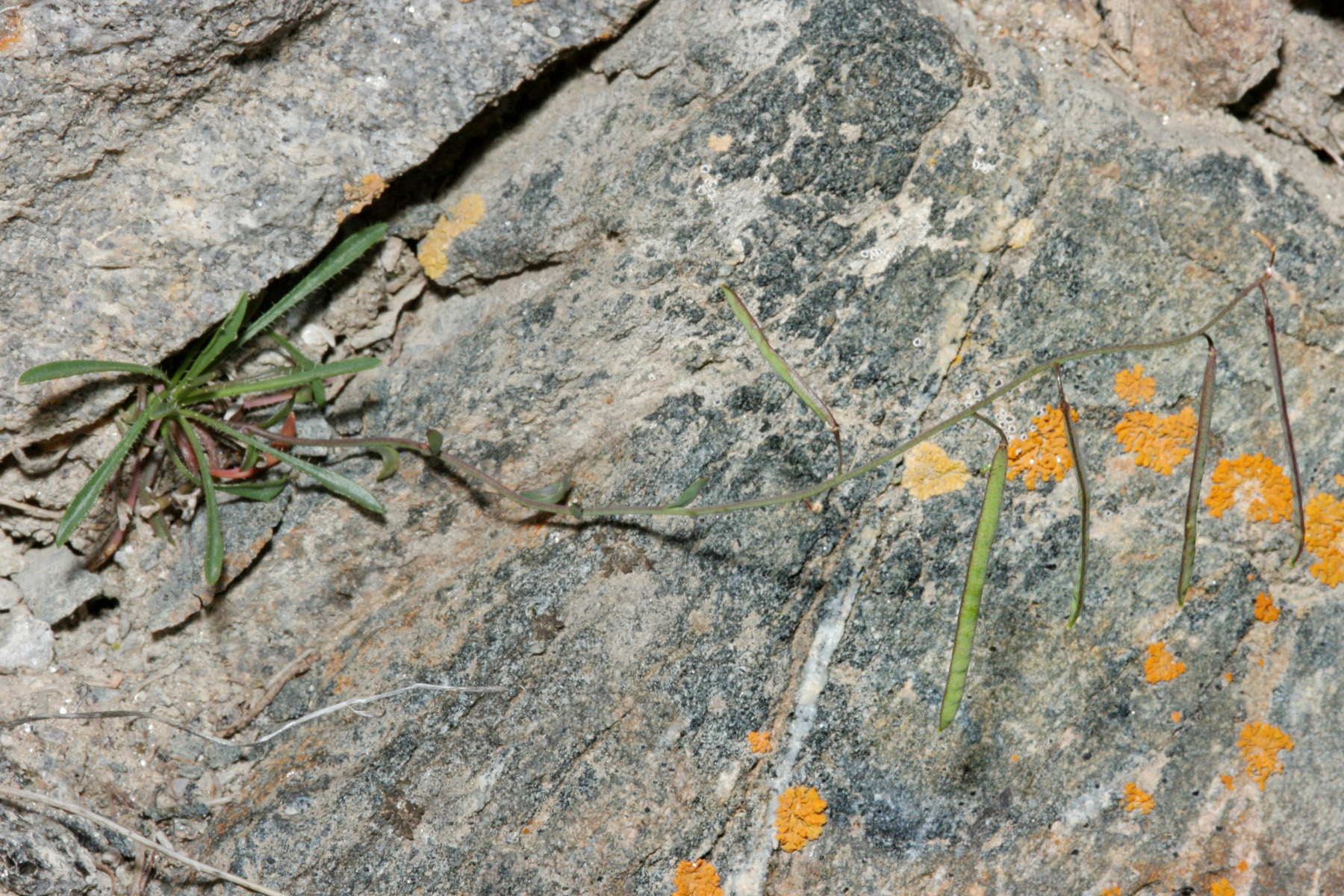
- Boechera oxylobula, near Morrow Point Dam on the south side of the Gunnison River.

Scientific classification
- Kingdom: Plantae
- Clade: Tracheophytes
- Clade: Angiosperms
- Clade: Eudicots
- Clade: Rosids
- Order: Brassicales
- Family: Brassicaceae
- Genus: Boechera
- Species: B. oxylobula

Binomial name
- Boechera oxylobula (Greene) W.A. Weber

Synonyms
- Arabis aprica Osterh. ex A. Nelson; Arabis demissa Greene; Arabis oxylobula Greene; Arabis rugocarpa Osterh.; Boechera demissa (Greene) W.A. Weber

= Boechera oxylobula =

Species of flowering plant

Boechera oxylobula, common name Glenwood Springs rockcress, is a plant species referred to as Arabis demissa in many older publications. The species is endemic to Colorado. It is known only from Garfield, Gunnison, Hinsdale, Lake, Mineral, Park, and Saguache counties in the central part of the state. It is found in open, rocky locations such as cliff faces, rocky slopes, and gravelly soil in brush.

Boechera oxylobula is a perennial herb with several stems arising from a basal rosette. Leaves are linear, up to 2.5 mm (0.1 inches) wide. Flowers are white to pale lavender, borne in a terminal raceme.
