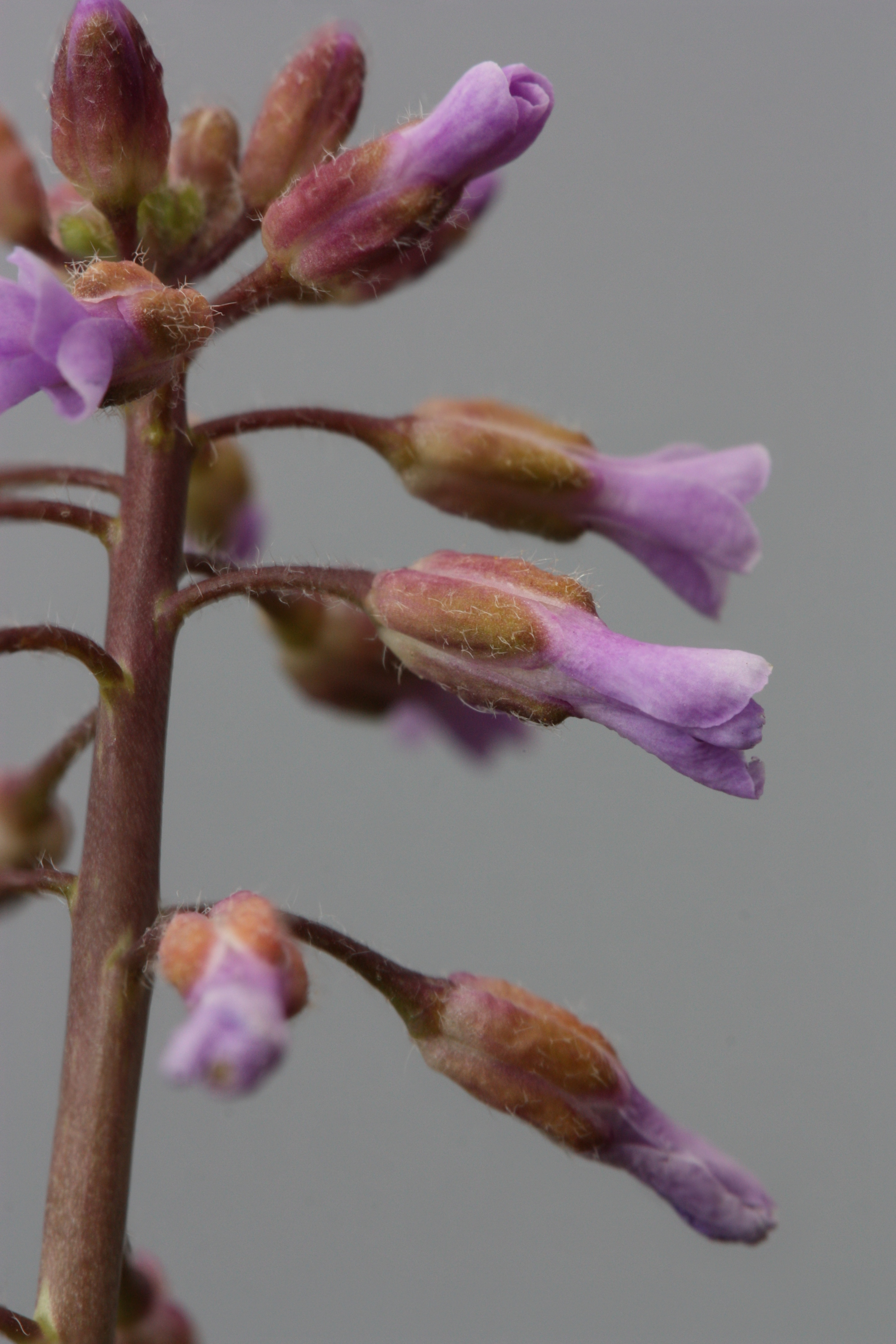
- Boechera sparsiflora in Wenas Wildlife Area, Washington

Scientific classification
- Kingdom: Plantae
- Clade: Tracheophytes
- Clade: Angiosperms
- Clade: Eudicots
- Clade: Rosids
- Order: Brassicales
- Family: Brassicaceae
- Genus: Boechera
- Species: B. sparsiflora

Binomial name
- Boechera sparsiflora (Nutt.) Dorn 2001

Subspecies
- Boechera sparsiflora var. subvillosa (S.Watson) Dorn

Synonyms
- Arabis arcoidea A.Nelson; Arabis columbiana Macoun; Arabis peramoena Greene; Arabis sparsiflora Nutt.; Arabis sparsiflora var. columbiana (Macoun) Rollins; Arabis sparsiflora var. peramoena (Greene) Rollins; Arabis sparsiflora var. sparsiflora; Boechera sparsiflora var. sparsiflora; of B. s. var subvillosa: Arabis arcuata var. subvillosa S.Watson; Arabis campyloloba Greene; Arabis elegans A.Nelson; Arabis perelegans A.Nelson; Arabis polytricha Greene; Arabis sparsiflora var. subvillosa (S.Watson) Rollins; Arabis subserrata Greene

= Boechera sparsiflora =

Species of flowering plant

Boechera sparsiflora (formerly Arabis sparsiflora) is a species of rockcress known by the common names sicklepod rockcress and elegant rockcress. It is native to western North America from California to Utah to Yukon, where it can be found in a number of habitats. This is a coarsely hairy perennial herb growing one or more thick stems from a caudex. The stem may branch or not and it reaches up to 90 centimeters in maximum height. The leaves vary in shape from linear to arrowhead-like and may or may not have toothed edges. They are usually hairy and up to 8 or 10 centimeters long. The raceme inflorescence bears a number of flowers with spoon-shaped petals about a centimeter long in shades of purple or pink. The fruit is a large, curved silique 6 to 12 centimeters long.
