= Aliciella subacaulis =

Scientific classification
- Kingdom: Plantae
- Clade: Tracheophytes
- Clade: Angiosperms
- Clade: Eudicots
- Clade: Asterids
- Order: Ericales
- Family: Polemoniaceae
- Genus: Aliciella
- Species: A. subacaulis

Binomial name
- Aliciella subacaulis (Rydb.) J.M.Porter & L.A.Johnson

Species of flowering plant

Aliciella subacaulis (formerly Gilia subacaulis) is a species of flowering plant in the phlox family known by the common name pinyon gilia. It is native to the western United States from California to Wyoming, where it grows in several types of habitat, such as sagebrush and desert woodlands. This herb produces a glandular stem up to about 30 centimeters tall, surrounded at the base by an erect cluster of lobed leaves each up to 7 centimeters long. There are also smaller, unlobed leaves along the stem. The inflorescence is a loose cluster of purple-washed white flowers with yellow-spotted throats.
