= Boechera yorkii =

Conservation status
- Critically Imperiled (NatureServe)

Scientific classification
- Kingdom: Plantae
- Clade: Tracheophytes
- Clade: Angiosperms
- Clade: Eudicots
- Clade: Rosids
- Order: Brassicales
- Family: Brassicaceae
- Genus: Boechera
- Species: B. yorkii

Binomial name
- Boechera yorkii S.Boyd

Species of flowering plant

Boechera yorkii is a rare species of flowering plant in the mustard family known by the common name Last Chance rockcress. It is endemic to Inyo County, California, where it is known only from the Last Chance Range in Death Valley National Park. There are only two occurrences known, but the plant occurs in remote, nearly inaccessible mountain territory, so more plants may exist unobserved. The species was only described to science in 2004. Its habitat is rocky mountain canyons on cliffs of dolomite.

This is a perennial herb growing from a tough, woody caudex with a basal rosette of narrow linear or lance-shaped leaves coated in branching hairs. The erect stem grows 10 to 30 centimeters tall. It is covered in a feltlike coat of hairs. The inflorescence atop the stem produces 8 to 35 flowers which grow outward and then droop. The flower has fuzzy-haired sepals and four petals each up to a centimeter long. The petals are yellow or brick red in color, or sometimes yellow with brick red tips. The fruit is a hairy silique up to four centimeters long. It is attached to the stem by a very short stalk that measures one or two millimeters long.

Although the plant is rare, it is not considered particularly vulnerable to human activity because of its remote location in rugged mountain habitat.
