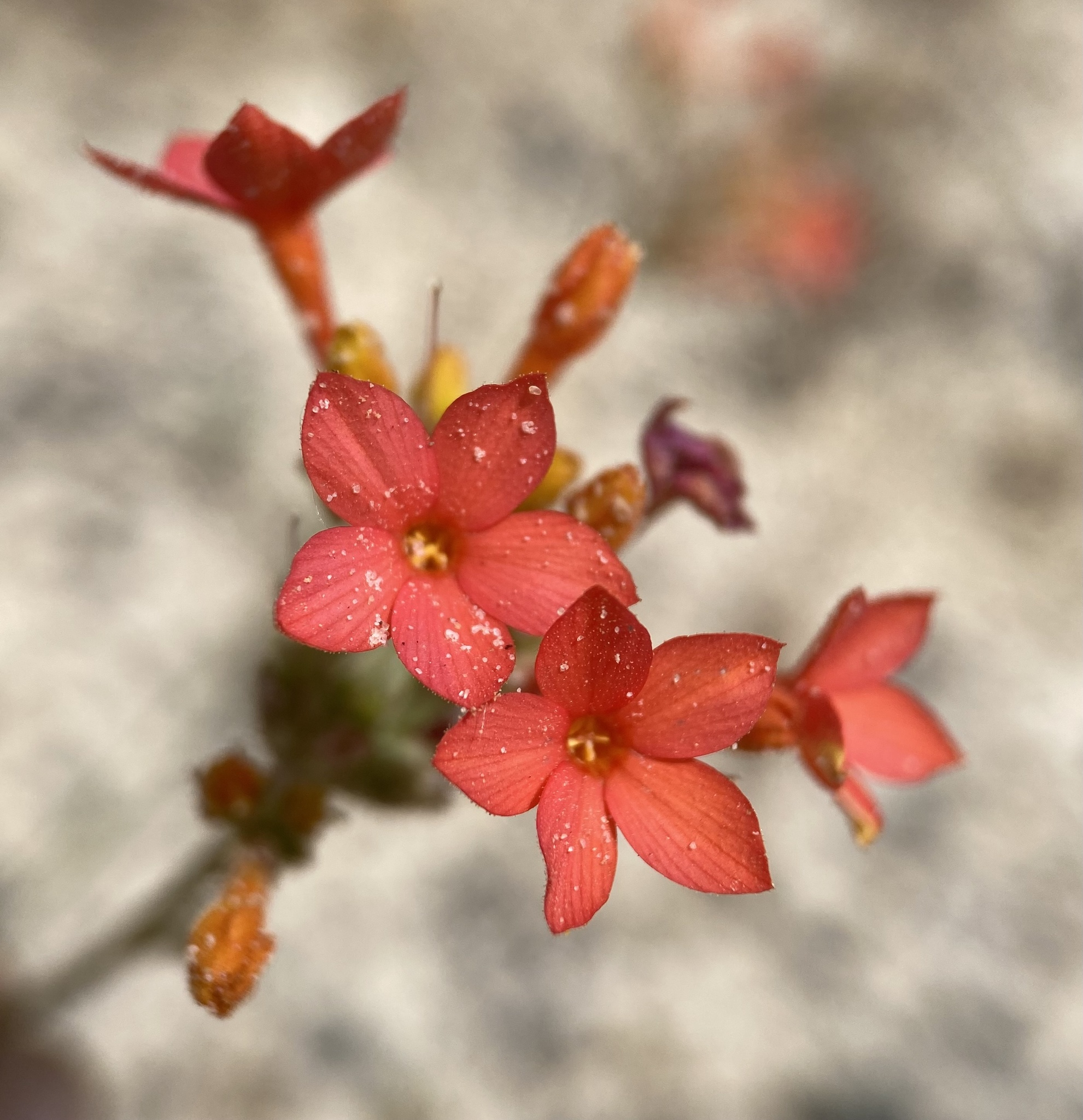
- In Utah

Conservation status
- Apparently Secure (NatureServe)

Scientific classification
- Kingdom: Plantae
- Clade: Tracheophytes
- Clade: Angiosperms
- Clade: Eudicots
- Clade: Asterids
- Order: Ericales
- Family: Polemoniaceae
- Genus: Aliciella
- Species: A. subnuda

Binomial name
- Aliciella subnuda (Torr. ex A.Gray) J.M.Porter

Synonyms
- Gilia subnuda; Gilia superba

= Aliciella subnuda =

Plant species in the phlox family

Aliciella subnuda (synonym Gilia subnuda, common name - coral gilia or carmine gilia) is a biennial or perennial plant in the phlox family (Polemoniaceae) found in the Colorado Plateau and Canyonlands region of the southwestern United States.

== Description ==
=== Growth pattern ===
It is a 6 to 20 inches (15 to 51 cm) biennial or perennial plant growing from a basal rosette.

Sticky leaves and stems catch blowing sand and dirt giving them a sandy coating.

=== Leaves and stems ===
3/4 to 3 3/4 inches (1.9 to 9.5 cm) lobed leaves are spatula shaped or egg shaped with sticky hairs.

Stems are thin and sticky.

=== Inflorescence and fruit ===
It blooms from May to July. Clustering at the ends of the stems, reddish or carmine flowers have a 3/8 to 3/4 inch (0.95 to 1.91 cm) long corolla tube flaring to 5 lobes.

== Taxonomy ==
Gilia subnuda was scientifically described and named in 1870 by Asa Gray, who credited the work of John Torrey. It was moved out of genus Gilia and into Aliciella as Aliciella subnuda in 1998 by James Mark Porter. Togeather with its genus it is classified in the Polemoniaceae family and the species has five botanical synonyms.

Table of Synonyms
Name	Year	Rank	Notes
Gilia subnuda Torr. ex A.Gray	1870	species	≡ hom.
Gilia subnuda subsp. haydenii Brand	1907	subspecies	= het.
Gilia subnuda subsp. superba Brand	1907	subspecies	≡ hom.
Gilia superba Eastw.	1893	species	≡ hom., nom. illeg.
Navarretia subnuda (Torr. ex A.Gray) Kuntze	1891	species	≡ hom.
Notes: ≡ homotypic synonym; = heterotypic synonym

== Habitat and range ==
It can be found in warm desert shrub, pinyon juniper woodland, and ponderosa pine forest communities across the southwestern United States.

== Ecological and human interactions ==
Flowers are pollinated by bees and hummingbirds.
