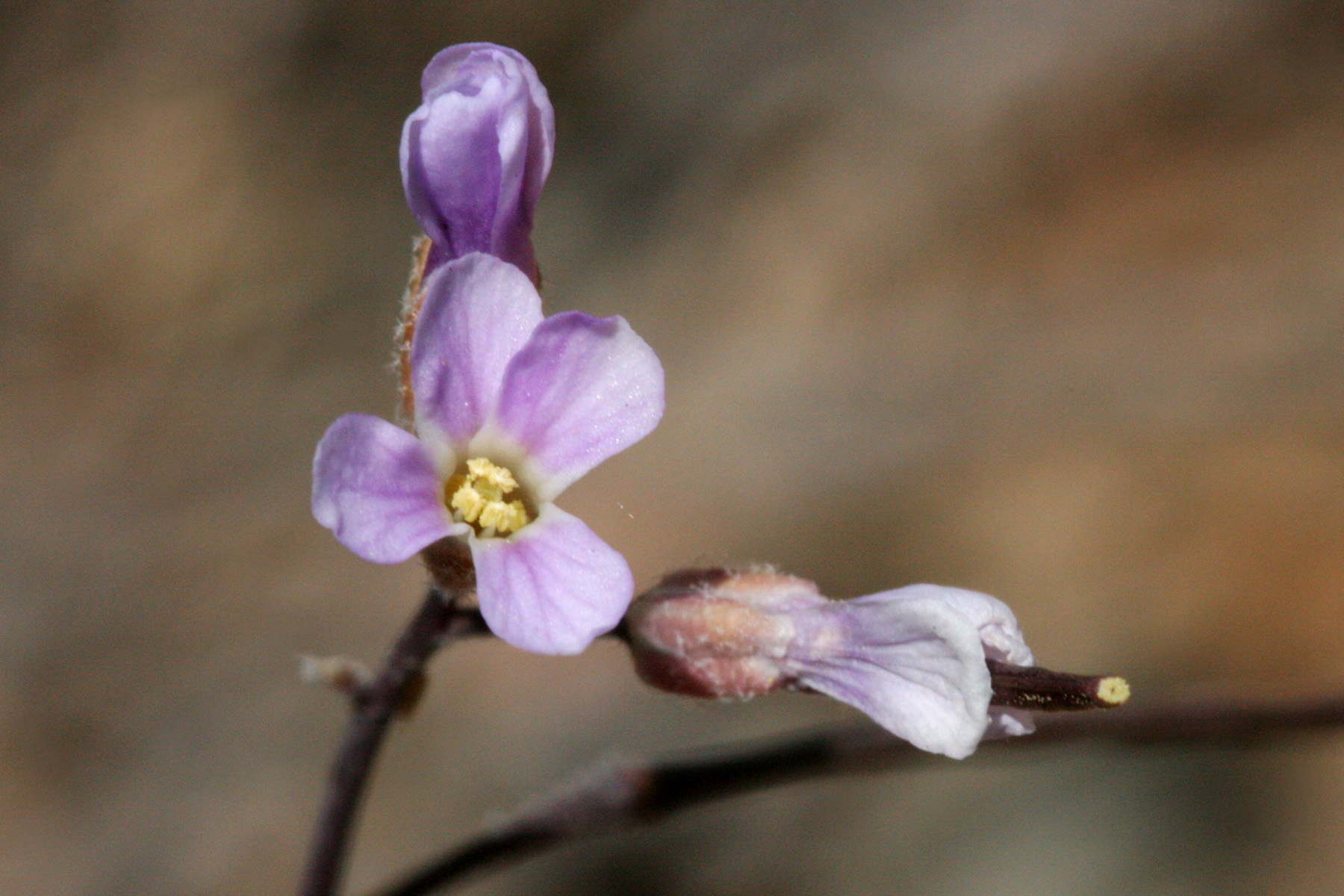

Conservation status
- Vulnerable (NatureServe)

Scientific classification
- Kingdom: Plantae
- Clade: Tracheophytes
- Clade: Angiosperms
- Clade: Eudicots
- Clade: Rosids
- Order: Brassicales
- Family: Brassicaceae
- Genus: Boechera
- Species: B. gunnisoniana

Binomial name
- Boechera gunnisoniana (Rollins) W.A.Weber

Synonyms
- Arabis gunnisoniana Rollins

= Boechera gunnisoniana =

Species of flowering plant

Boechera gunnisoniana, or Gunnison's rockcress, is a perennial herb of the family Brassicaceae (the mustards). It grows on windswept ridges as well as on stoney hillsides in west-central Colorado. The plant has many slender, erect stems which may reach a height of 15 cm. Flowering time is from May to June.

According to chromosome counts, this species is diploid (n=7 as in all Boechera species) which probably reproduces sexually.
