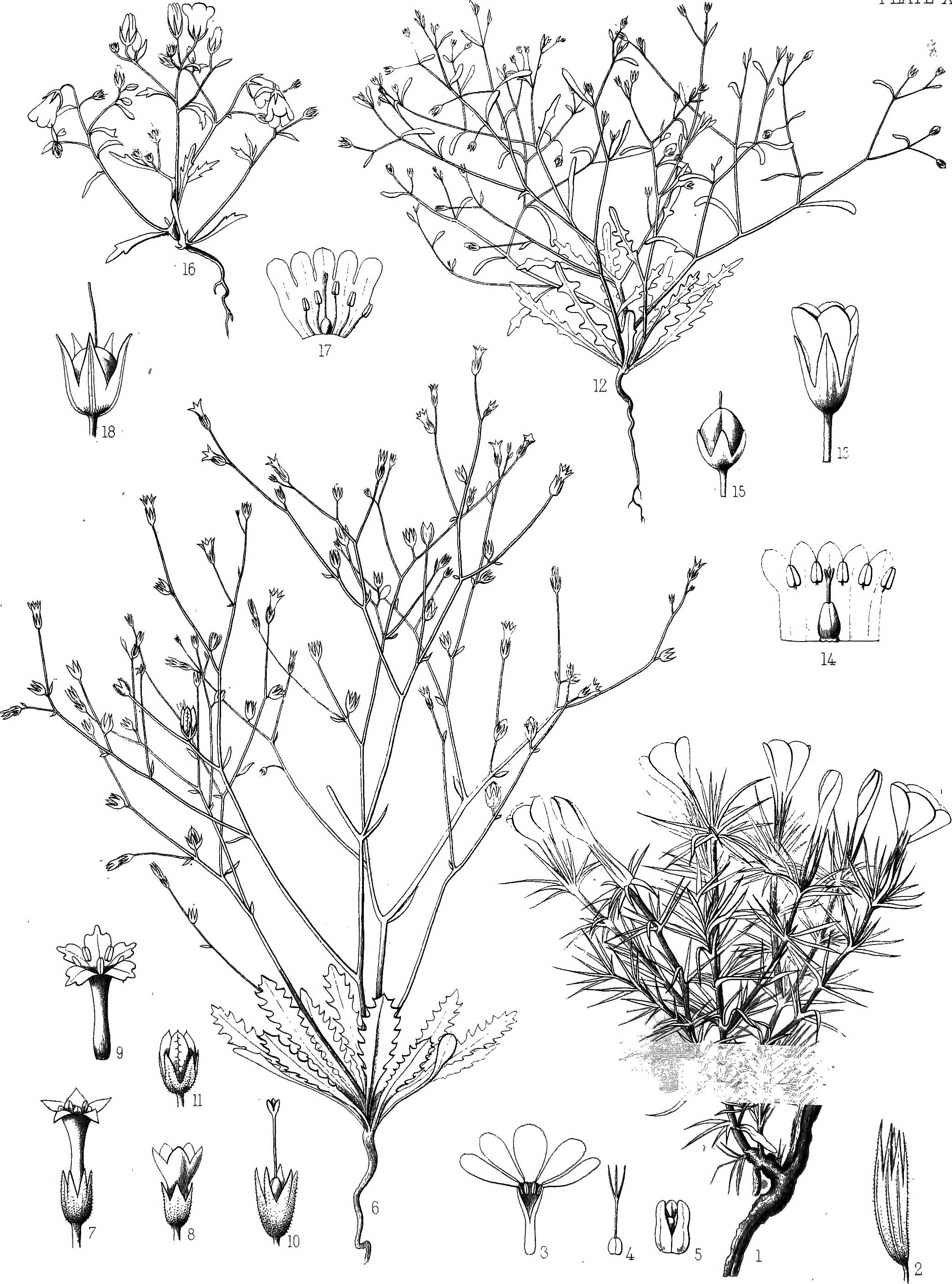
- Aliciella micromeria (upper right illustration)

Conservation status
- Apparently Secure (NatureServe)

Scientific classification
- Kingdom: Plantae
- Clade: Tracheophytes
- Clade: Angiosperms
- Clade: Eudicots
- Clade: Asterids
- Order: Ericales
- Family: Polemoniaceae
- Genus: Aliciella
- Species: A. micromeria

Binomial name
- Aliciella micromeria (A.Gray) J.M.Porter

Synonyms
- Gilia micromeria; Navarretia micromeria

= Aliciella micromeria =

Plant species in the phlox family

Aliciella micromeria (formerly Gilia micromeria) is a species of flowering plant in the phlox family known by the common name dainty gilia. It is native to the western United States, especially the Great Basin. It is a small herb producing a thin, branching stem up to about 14 centimeters tall. It is coated thinly in soft hairs. Several deeply lobed leaves 1 to 6 centimeters long are located in a basal rosette at ground level around the stem. There are smaller, unlobed leaves along the stem. The inflorescence produces white or lavender flowers each about 3 millimeters wide.

== Taxonomy ==
Aliciella micromeria was scientifically described in 1870 by Asa Gray, who placed it in the genus Gilia with the name Gilia micromeria. It was moved to Aliciella in 1998 by James Mark Porter, giving the species its accepted name. The species has no accepted subspecies, but has four homotypic synonyms.

Table of Synonyms
Name	Year	Rank
Gilia leptomeria subsp. micromeria (A.Gray) H.Mason & A.D.Grant	1948	subspecies
Gilia leptomeria var. micromeria (A.Gray) Cronquist	1959	variety
Gilia micromeria A.Gray	1870	species
Navarretia micromeria (A.Gray) Kuntze	1891	species
