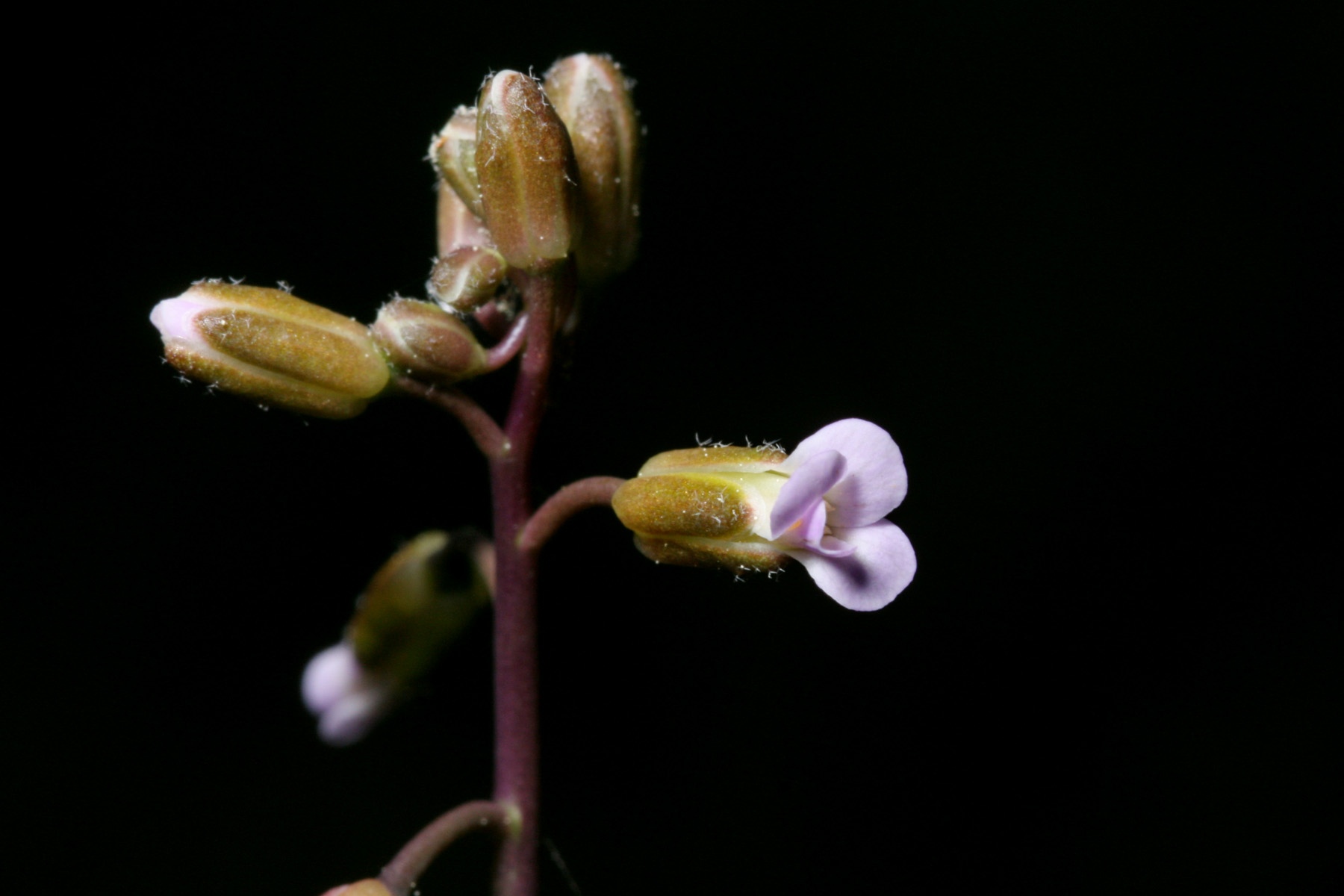
- Boechera tularensis along Fish Creek Trail in California

Conservation status
- Vulnerable (NatureServe)

Scientific classification
- Kingdom: Plantae
- Clade: Tracheophytes
- Clade: Angiosperms
- Clade: Eudicots
- Clade: Rosids
- Order: Brassicales
- Family: Brassicaceae
- Genus: Boechera
- Species: B. tularensis

Binomial name
- Boechera tularensis Windham & Al-Shehbaz

= Boechera tularensis =

Species of flowering plant

Boechera tularensis, common name Tulare rockcress, is a plant species endemic to California. It has been reported from Inyo, Mono, Tulare, Fresno, Madera, El Dorado and Mariposa Counties. It grows on rocky slopes in subalpine habitats at elevations of 2,400–3,200 m (7,870–10,500 ft)

Boechera tularensis is a biennial or short lived perennial herb, probably reproducing by apomixis (asexual production of cloned seeds). It can reach a height of up to 70 cm (28 in). Flowers are white to pale lavender with 6-7mm petals and bloom in June and July. Its fruit is appressed and 4–8.5 cm (1.6–3.3 in) long. The plant is listed as "rare, threatened, or endangered in California and elsewhere" and is considered imperilled globally

Morphological evidence suggests that Boechera tularensis is an apomictic species that contains three different genomes, one each from B. rectissima, B. retrofracta, and B. stricta. It is most often confused with B. pinetorum and B. retrofracta, but can be distinguished. It is known from the southern Sierra Nevada (Fresno and Tulare counties).
