= Boechera fecunda =

Conservation status
- Imperiled (NatureServe)

Scientific classification
- Kingdom: Plantae
- Clade: Tracheophytes
- Clade: Angiosperms
- Clade: Eudicots
- Clade: Rosids
- Order: Brassicales
- Family: Brassicaceae
- Genus: Boechera
- Species: B. fecunda

Binomial name
- Boechera fecunda (Rollins) Dorn

Synonyms
- Arabis fecunda Rollins

Species of flowering plant

Boechera fecunda (syn. Arabis fecunda) is a species of flowering plant in the mustard family known by the common names Mt. Sapphire rockcress and Sapphire rockcress. It is endemic to Montana in the United States, where there are twenty known occurrences in three counties.

== Description ==
This perennial herb produces a basal rosette of leaves. The basal leaves are spoon-shaped or lance-shaped and measure 1 to 3 centimeters in length. Leaves higher on the stem are smaller and clasp the stalk. The plant is coated in grayish hairs. The flowering stalk is up to 30 centimeters tall and has white or blue-tinged flowers. The fruit is a hairy grayish silique up to 5 centimeters long. The plant has two reproductive modes. Some plants produce axillary flowers and some produce terminal flowers at the top of the stem. Some produce both. Plants with terminal inflorescences are often semelparous, blooming once and then dying. Axillary-flowering plants may be iteroparous, flowering several seasons.

== Distribution and habitat ==
This plant grows in Ravalli, Beaverhead, and Silver Bow Counties in Montana. It grows in the ecotone between the lower tree line and the shrub- and grasslands. It grows on steep, eroding cliffs that are sparsely vegetated. The soils are calcareous, made up of a calcium silicate parent rock. The plant is associated with Pseudotsuga menziesii and Pinus ponderosa. The plant commonly grows in areas covered in a cryptogamic soil crust, which appears to have a beneficial effect on the plants.

== Conservation ==
Threats to the species include the noxious weed Centaurea maculosa, spotted knapweed. The weed has a negative effect on rockcress populations, reducing seedling establishment. Livestock are another threat, trampling the land and facilitating the introduction of weeds. Mining activity is another threat.
