= Boechera dispar =

Conservation status
- Vulnerable (NatureServe)

Scientific classification
- Kingdom: Plantae
- Clade: Tracheophytes
- Clade: Angiosperms
- Clade: Eudicots
- Clade: Rosids
- Order: Brassicales
- Family: Brassicaceae
- Genus: Boechera
- Species: B. dispar

Binomial name
- Boechera dispar (M.E.Jones) Al-Shehbaz

Synonyms
- Arabis dispar M.E. Jones

Species of flowering plant

Boechera dispar is a species of flowering plant in the family Brassicaceae known by the common name pinyon rockcress. It is native to eastern California and western Nevada, where it grows in rocky areas in desert and mountain habitat. This is a perennial herb growing from a branching caudex. It produces several erect stems reaching 10 to 25 centimeters (3.9 to 9.8 in) tall. The leaves are mostly located about the caudex. They are linear to lance-shaped, coated in white hairs, and one or two centimeters long. The flowers have purple petals. The fruit is a long, narrow, hairless silique up to 7 centimeters (2.8 in) long containing round, winged seeds.
