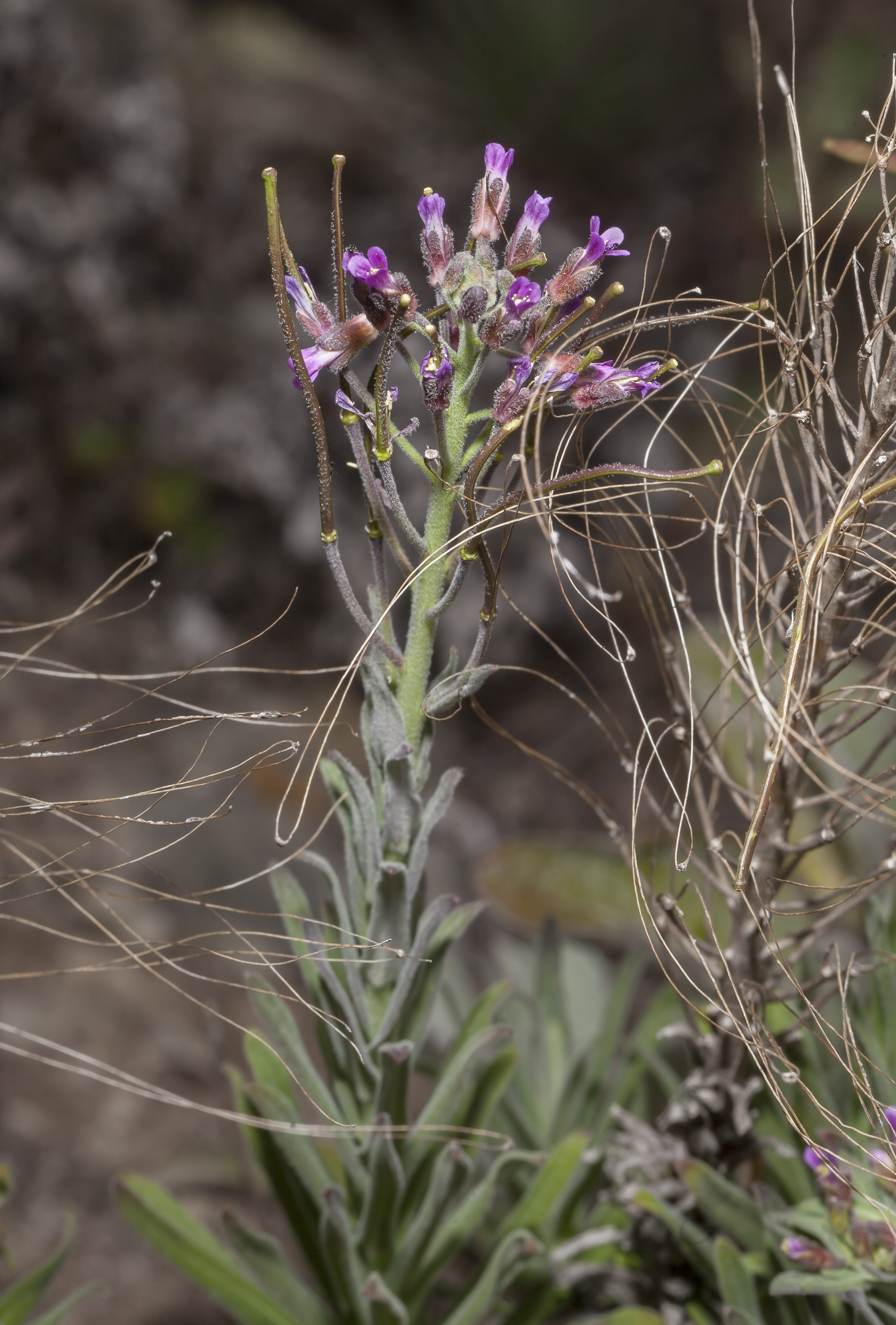

Conservation status
- Endangered (ESA)

Scientific classification
- Kingdom: Plantae
- Clade: Tracheophytes
- Clade: Angiosperms
- Clade: Eudicots
- Clade: Rosids
- Order: Brassicales
- Family: Brassicaceae
- Genus: Boechera
- Species: B. hoffmannii

Binomial name
- Boechera hoffmannii (Munz) Al-Shehbaz

Synonyms
- Arabis hoffmannii

= Boechera hoffmannii =

Hoffmann's rockcress

Species of flowering plant

Boechera hoffmannii (formerly Arabis hoffmannii) is a rare species of flowering plant in the family Brassicaceae known by the common name Hoffmann's rockcress. It is endemic to the Channel Islands of California, where it is known from only three or four populations on two of the eight islands. A 2005 report estimated a remaining global population of 244 individual plants. It is a federally listed endangered species.

This is a perennial herb producing one or more erect stems from a scaly, hairy caudex. The stems reach a maximum height between 50 and 70 centimeters and branch near the top. Leaves are densely clustered around the caudex in a basal rosette. They are lance-shaped, leathery with hairy undersides, and up to 10 centimeters long. There are more widely spaced leaves along the stem which are 3 to 6 centimeters long. The inflorescence bears many white or purple flowers with thick, dark sepals. The fruit is a tough, hairless silique up to 10 centimeters long containing 2 rows of seeds.

The main threats to the existence of this rare plant are grazing and erosion caused by feral pigs and competition by invasive grasses. The populations of this plant are also slow to reproduce. They are monocarpic, with each individual living for a few years, fruiting once, and then dying, and each population has relatively few actively reproducing individuals in any given year.
