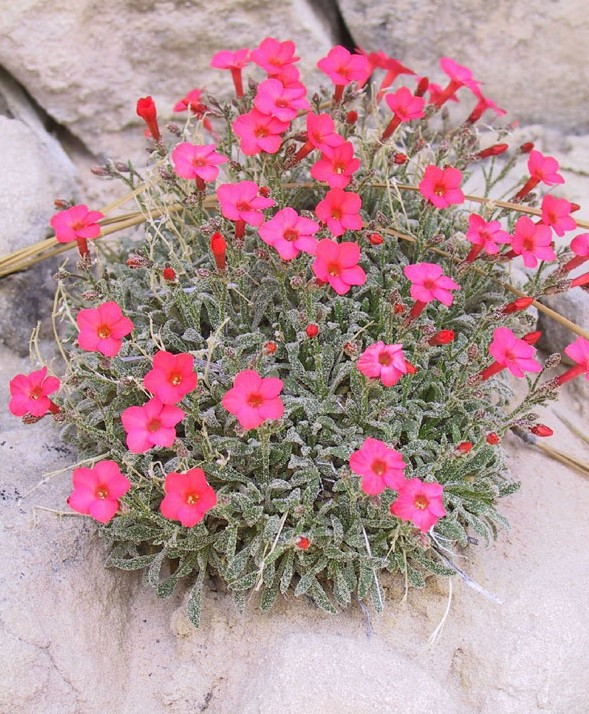

Conservation status
- Imperiled (NatureServe)

Scientific classification
- Kingdom: Plantae
- Clade: Tracheophytes
- Clade: Angiosperms
- Clade: Eudicots
- Clade: Asterids
- Order: Ericales
- Family: Polemoniaceae
- Genus: Aliciella
- Species: A. caespitosa

Binomial name
- Aliciella caespitosa (A.Gray) J.M. Porter

Synonyms
- Gilia caespitosa

= Aliciella caespitosa =

Species of flowering plant

Aliciella caespitosa (syn. Gilia caespitosa) is a species of flowering plant in the phlox family known by the common names Rabbit Valley gilia and Wonderland Alice-flower. It is endemic to Utah, where it is known only from Wayne County.

This perennial herb has a thick basal clump of sticky leaves growing just a few centimeters tall. The flowers are scarlet to blue-purple in color, sometimes fading maroon or purple. Flowering occurs in June and July, and seeds are produced in July and August.

This species was collected in 1875 and not reported again for 90 years. There are about 6 populations spread across 40 sites, for a total of 15,000 to 25,000 individuals. All are within 90 square kilometers in one Utah county. The plant grows on the Navajo and Wingate Sandstones in sandy rock crevices, rocky slopes, and arroyos. The habitat is often pinyon-juniper woodland, sometimes with sagebrush or Ponderosa pine.

Threats to this species include poaching for the horticultural trade; however, most plants are located on inaccessible terrain. Widening of highways may be a threat. Sand and sandstone mining may be a threat.
