= Boechera cobrensis =

Scientific classification
- Kingdom: Plantae
- Clade: Tracheophytes
- Clade: Angiosperms
- Clade: Eudicots
- Clade: Rosids
- Order: Brassicales
- Family: Brassicaceae
- Genus: Boechera
- Species: B. cobrensis

Binomial name
- Boechera cobrensis (M.E.Jones) Dorn

Synonyms
- Arabis cobrensis

Species of flowering plant

Boechera cobrensis (syn. Arabis cobrensis) is a species of flowering plant in the mustard family known by the common names Masonic rockcress and sagebrush rockcress. It is native to the western United States from eastern California to Wyoming, where it is found in sandy habitat, especially sagebrush. This is a perennial herb growing several erect, slender stems to heights near half a meter from a branching caudex. The plant forms a narrow clump with a base of narrow, linear, densely hairy leaves up to 5 centimeters long. There are also a few slightly shorter leaves clasping the stems at intervals. The top of each stem is occupied by an inflorescence of small, nodding flowers with dull yellowish sepals and white petals. The flowers give way to fruits which are narrow, straight siliques up to 4 centimeters long containing winged seeds.
