= Boechera constancei =

Conservation status
- Imperiled (NatureServe)

Scientific classification
- Kingdom: Plantae
- Clade: Tracheophytes
- Clade: Angiosperms
- Clade: Eudicots
- Clade: Rosids
- Order: Brassicales
- Family: Brassicaceae
- Genus: Boechera
- Species: B. constancei

Binomial name
- Boechera constancei (Rollins) Al-Shehbaz

Species of flowering plant

Boechera constancei is a species of flowering plant in the mustard family known by the common name Constance's rockcress. It is endemic to California, where it is known only from the northern Sierra Nevada of Plumas and Sierra Counties. It is a member of the serpentine soils flora. This is a perennial herb growing from a branching, woody caudex. It produces one or more erect, hairless stems to maximum heights between 15 and 30 centimeters. The caudex is surrounded by a dense basal rosette of stiff, blue-green, lance-shaped leaves up to 3 centimeters long. There may be a few smaller leaves along the stem. The inflorescence produces 5 to 10 white mustardlike flowers with protruding stamens. The fruit is a hanging green silique 4 or 5 centimeters long which contains round, winged seeds.
