= Aliciella sedifolia =

Conservation status
- Critically Imperiled (NatureServe)

Scientific classification
- Kingdom: Plantae
- Clade: Embryophytes
- Clade: Tracheophytes
- Clade: Spermatophytes
- Clade: Angiosperms
- Clade: Eudicots
- Clade: Asterids
- Order: Ericales
- Family: Polemoniaceae
- Genus: Aliciella
- Species: A. sedifolia

Binomial name
- Aliciella sedifolia (Brandegee) J.M.Porter

Synonyms
- Gilia sedifolia

Plant species in the phlox family

Aliciella sedifolia (formerly Gilia sedifolia) is a rare species of flowering plant in the phlox family, commonly known as stonecrop gilia. It is endemic to Colorado in the United States, and it is limited to a small area in the San Juan Mountains.

This plant is unlikely to be confused with any other. It is a perennial herb growing from a taproot, reaching only a short stature. The leaves are linear in shape and succulent in texture, resembling those of stonecrops (Sedum), giving the species its name. The inflorescence is a spikelike cluster of blue-purple flowers. The seeds are winged. Blooming occurs in July and August, and possibly September.

This plant is limited to the alpine climates of the high San Juan Mountains. It grows on white volcanic ash and sandstone talus. The local elevation is between 11,800 and 13,400 feet. Alpine avens (Geum rossii) is a dominant plant in the area, but the gilia only occurs in bare patches amidst the plant cover.

This is "an extremely rare endemic" plant, with only two occurrences known. The first population was in an uncertain location and when searchers were unable to find it, the plant was feared extinct. This occurrence was rediscovered in 2007. In the meantime, a second occurrence was found on Half Peak; it is made up of two stands of plants totalling 1100 individuals. All the plants are on land managed by the United States Forest Service.

This plant is threatened by off-road vehicle use.

== Taxonomy ==
In 1899 the botanist Townshend Stith Brandegee scientifically described a new species in the genus Gilia which he named Gilia sedifolia. In 1998 James Mark Porter moved it to Aliciella giving the species its accepted name of Aliciella sedifolia. It only has the one botanical synonym and no subspecies.
