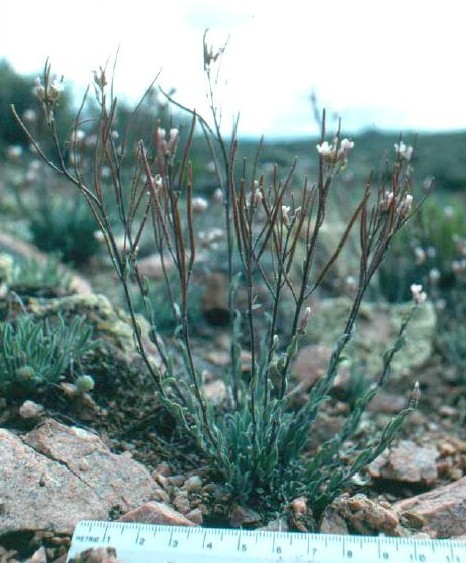

Conservation status
- Vulnerable (NatureServe)

Scientific classification
- Kingdom: Plantae
- Clade: Tracheophytes
- Clade: Angiosperms
- Clade: Eudicots
- Clade: Rosids
- Order: Brassicales
- Family: Brassicaceae
- Genus: Boechera
- Species: B. crandallii

Binomial name
- Boechera crandallii (B.L.Rob.) W.A.Weber

= Boechera crandallii =

Species of flowering plant

Boechera crandallii, or Crandall's rockcress, is found in Wyoming and Colorado where it is found on limestone chip-rock and stony areas, often among sagebrush. Flowering time is from May to June.

According to chromosome counts by Rollins (1941 and 1966) B. crandalli has been identified as a diploid with n=7 which presumably reproduces sexually.
