= Aliciella formosa =

Conservation status
- Imperiled (NatureServe)

Scientific classification
- Kingdom: Plantae
- Clade: Tracheophytes
- Clade: Angiosperms
- Clade: Eudicots
- Clade: Asterids
- Order: Ericales
- Family: Polemoniaceae
- Genus: Aliciella
- Species: A. formosa

Binomial name
- Aliciella formosa (Grene ex Brand) J.M. Porter

Synonyms
- Gilia formosa

Species of flowering plant

Aliciella formosa is a species of flowering plant in the phlox family known by the common name Aztec gilia. It is endemic to New Mexico in the United States, where it is known only from San Juan County.

This perennial herb grows up to 30 centimeters tall, with several erect stems. It sometimes develops a woody base. The sharp-pointed, glandular leaves are up to 2.5 centimeters in length. The flowers are trumpet-shaped and may exceed two centimeters in length. They are pinkish purple in color and bloom in April and May.

This plant is limited to the Nacimiento Formation, where it grows in salt desert scrub vegetation communities.

There are over 100 occurrences, and the plant can be locally abundant, but in general it is rare. It is threatened by oil and gas development. During development, a petroleum company removed some plants and kept them in a greenhouse, transplanting them back into the habitat when it moved out of the area. Few of the plants survived.
