= Diabase Hills =

Mountain range in Nevada, United States

- Location within Nevada

Highest point
- Elevation: 1,579 m (5,180 ft)

Geography
- Country: United States
- State: Nevada
- District: Washoe County
- Range coordinates: 39°44′23.679″N 119°17′31.616″W
- Topo map: USGS Wadsworth

The Diabase Hills are a mountain range in Washoe County, Nevada.
