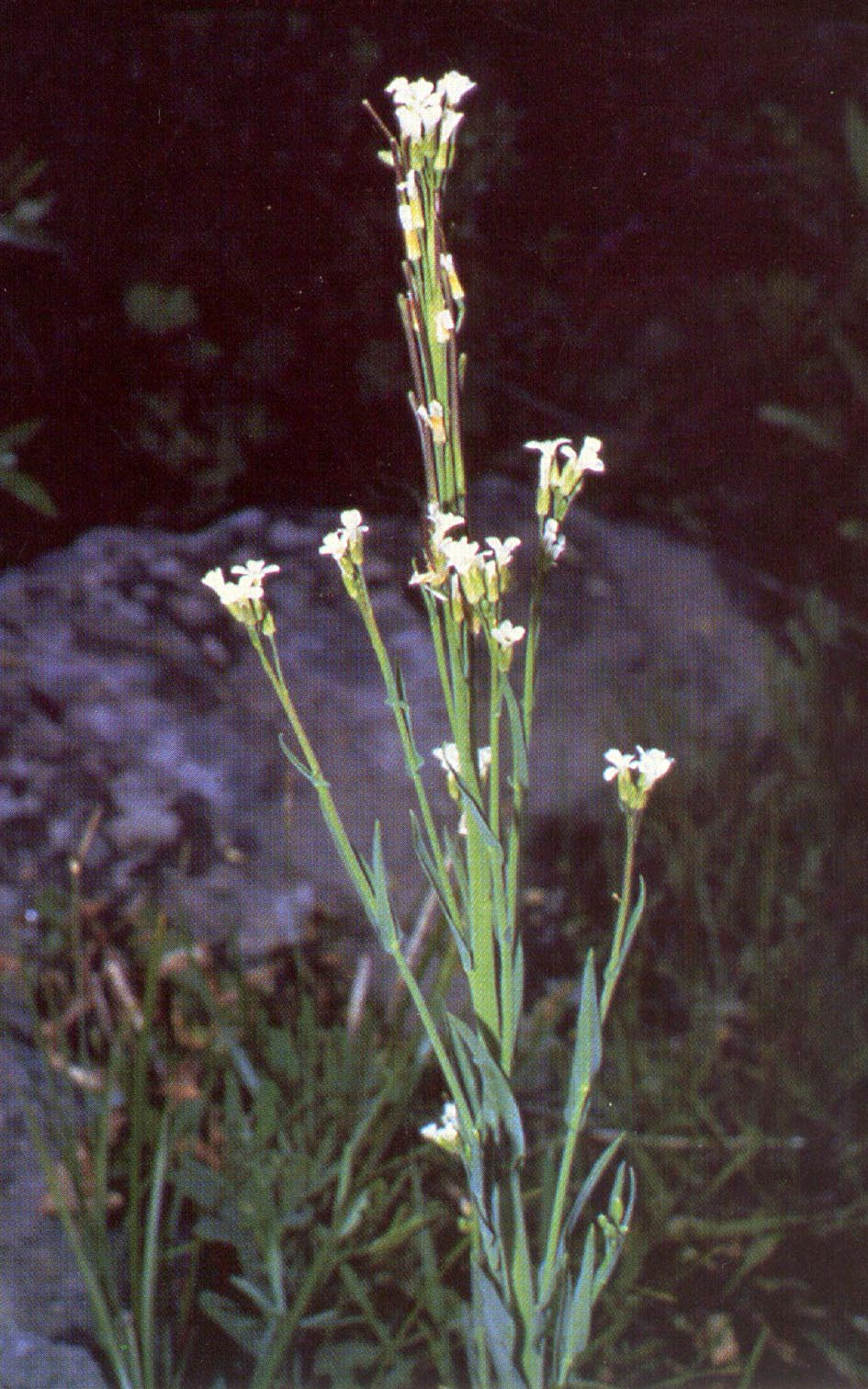
- Boechera stricta

Scientific classification
- Kingdom: Plantae
- Clade: Tracheophytes
- Clade: Angiosperms
- Clade: Eudicots
- Clade: Rosids
- Order: Brassicales
- Family: Brassicaceae
- Genus: Boechera; Á.Löve & D.Löve

Species
- See text

= Boechera =

Genus of plants

Boechera (rockcress) is a genus of the family Brassicaceae. It was named after the Danish botanist Tyge W. Böcher (1909–1983), who was known for his research in alpine plants, including the mustards Draba and Boechera holboellii. According to recent molecular-based studies, Boechera is closely related to the genus Arabidopsis which also includes the widely known model plant Arabidopsis thaliana.

Until recently, members of this genus were included in the genus Arabis, but have been separated from that genus based on recent genetic and cytological data. Unlike the genus Arabis (x=8) Boechera has a base chromosome number of x=7. Many taxa are triploid. Boechera is a primarily North American genus, most diverse in the western United States, and its distribution range also includes Greenland and the Russian Far East. The genus is poorly known, and species within are difficult to separate morphologically though some clearly distinct species are known.

Most members of the genus are perennial plants with pubescent leaves with stellate trichomes, narrow curving fruits, and small white to purple flowers in elongated racemes. Relationships within the genus are unclear, and some eastern North American species, including Boechera laevigata, may belong to a clade distinct from the rest of the genus.

A very interesting feature of many species of the genus is asexual reproduction, a process known as apomixis. Microsatellite data has revealed that some of the apomictic lineages are hybrids between two or more sexual parents.

== Ecology ==
Species in this genus are one of the main food sources for the caterpillars of the butterfly Pieris oleracea.

== Species ==
100 species are accepted.

- Boechera acutina (Greene) Windham & Al-Shehbaz
- Boechera angustifolia (Nutt.) Dorn (synonym Boechera stricta Al-Shehbaz) – Drummond's rockcress
- Boechera arcuata (Nutt.) Windham & Al-Shehbaz
- Boechera atrorubens (Suksd. ex Greene) Windham & Al-Shehbaz
- Boechera austromontana Windham & Allphin
- Boechera bodiensis (Rollins) Al-Shehbaz
- Boechera botulifructa D.P.Morin
- Boechera breweri (S.Watson) Al-Shehbaz – Brewer's rockcress
- Boechera calderi (G.A.Mulligan) Windham & Al-Shehbaz
- Boechera californica (Rollins) Windham & Al-Shehbaz
- Boechera cascadensis Windham & Al-Shehbaz
- Boechera cobrensis (M.E.Jones) Dorn – sagebrush rockcress
- Boechera collinsii (Fernald) Á.Löve & D.Löve
- Boechera consanguinea (Greene) Windham & Al-Shehbaz
- Boechera constancei (Rollins) Al-Shehbaz – Constance's rockcress
- Boechera covillei (Greene) Windham & Al-Shehbaz
- Boechera crandallii (B.L.Rob.) W.A.Weber – Crandall's rockcress
- Boechera cusickii (S.Watson) Al-Shehbaz
- Boechera davidsonii (Greene) N.H.Holmgren
- Boechera depauperata (A.Nelson & P.B.Kenn.) Windham & Al-Shehbaz – soldier rockcress
- Boechera dispar (M.E.Jones) Al-Shehbaz – pinyon rockcress
- Boechera divaricarpa (A.Nelson) Á.Löve & D.Löve
- Boechera drepanoloba (Greene) Windham & Al-Shehbaz
- Boechera duchesnensis (Rollins) Windham, Al-Shehbaz & Allphin
- Boechera duriuscula (Greene) D.P.Morin
- Boechera elkoensis Windham & Al-Shehbaz
- Boechera evadens Windham & Al-Shehbaz
- Boechera falcata (Turcz.) Al-Shehbaz
- Boechera falcatoria (Rollins) Dorn – Grouse Creek rockcress
- Boechera falcifructa (Rollins) Al-Shehbaz
- Boechera fecunda (Rollins) Dorn – sapphire rockcress
- Boechera fernaldiana (Rollins) W.A.Weber
- Boechera formosa (Greene) Windham & Al-Shehbaz
- Boechera fructicosa (A.Nelson) Al-Shehbaz
- Boechera glareosa Dorn
- Boechera glaucovalvula (M.E.Jones) Al-Shehbaz
- Boechera goodrichii (S.L.Welsh) N.H.Holmgren
- Boechera gracilenta (Greene) Windham & Al-Shehbaz – Selby's rockcress
- Boechera grahamii (Lehm.) Windham & Al-Shehbaz
- Boechera gunnisoniana (Rollins) W.A.Weber – Gunnison's rockcress
- Boechera harrisonii (S.L.Welsh) Windham & Al-Shehbaz
- Boechera hastatula (Greene) Al-Shehbaz
- Boechera hoffmannii (Munz) Al-Shehbaz – Hoffmann's rockcress
- Boechera holboellii (Hornem.) Á.Löve & D.Löve – Holboell's rockcress
- Boechera horizontalis (Greene) Windham & Al-Shehbaz
- Boechera howellii (S.Watson) Windham & Al-Shehbaz
- Boechera inyoensis (Rollins) Al-Shehbaz
- Boechera johnstonii (Munz) Al-Shehbaz
- Boechera koehleri (Howell) Al-Shehbaz
- Boechera languida (Rollins) Windham & Al-Shehbaz
- Boechera lasiocarpa (Rollins) Dorn
- Boechera lemmonii (S.Watson) W.A.Weber
- Boechera lignifera (A.Nelson) W.A.Weber – desert rockcress
- Boechera lincolnensis Windham & Al-Shehbaz
- Boechera lyallii (S.Watson) Dorn
- Boechera macounii (S.Watson) Windham & Al-Shehbaz
- Boechera microphylla (Nutt. ex Torr. & A.Gray) Dorn
- Boechera nevadensis (Tidestr.) Windham & Al-Shehbaz
- Boechera ophira (Rollins) Al-Shehbaz – Ophir rockcress
- Boechera oxylobula (Greene) W.A.Weber – Glenwood Springs rockcress
- Boechera paddoensis (Rollins) Windham & Al-Shehbaz
- Boechera pallidifolia (Rollins) W.A.Weber – Gunnison County rockcress
- Boechera parishii (S.Watson) Al-Shehbaz
- Boechera pauciflora (Nutt.) Windham & Al-Shehbaz
- Boechera paupercula (Greene) Windham & Al-Shehbaz
- Boechera peirsonii Windham & Al-Shehbaz
- Boechera pendulina (Greene) W.A.Weber
- Boechera pendulocarpa (A.Nelson) Windham & Al-Shehbaz
- Boechera perennans (S.Watson) W.A.Weber – perennial rockcress
- Boechera pinetorum (Tidestr.) Windham & Al-Shehbaz
- Boechera pinzliae (Rollins) Al-Shehbaz
- Boechera platysperma (A.Gray) Al-Shehbaz – pioneer rockcress
- Boechera polyantha (Greene) Windham & Al-Shehbaz
- Boechera pratincola (Greene) Windham & Al-Shehbaz
- Boechera pseudoconsanguinea Windham & Allphin
- Boechera puberula (Nutt.) Dorn
- Boechera pulchra (M.E.Jones ex S.Watson) W.A.Weber – beautiful rockcress
- Boechera pusilla (Rollins) Dorn
- Boechera pygmaea (Rollins) Al-Shehbaz
- Boechera quadrangulensis Windham & Allphin
- Boechera quebecensis Windham & Al-Shehbaz – Quebec rockcress
- Boechera rectissima (Greene) Al-Shehbaz
- Boechera retrofracta (Graham) Á.Löve & D.Löve
- Boechera rigidissima (Rollins) Al-Shehbaz
- Boechera rollei (Rollins) Al-Shehbaz
- Boechera rollinsiorum Windham & Al-Shehbaz
- Boechera × rubicundula (Jeps.) Windham & Al-Shehbaz
- Boechera saximontana (Rollins) Windham & Al-Shehbaz
- Boechera schistacea (Rollins) Dorn
- Boechera serpenticola Windham & Al-Shehbaz
- Boechera shevockii Windham & Al-Shehbaz
- Boechera shockleyi (Munz) Dorn
- Boechera sierraensis Windham & Al-Shehbaz
- Boechera sparsiflora (Nutt.) Dorn – sicklepod rockcress
- Boechera subpinnatifida (S.Watson) Al-Shehbaz
- Boechera suffrutescens (S.Watson) Dorn
- Boechera tiehmii (Rollins) Al-Shehbaz
- Boechera tularensis Windham & Al-Shehbaz – Tulare rockcress
- Boechera ultraalsa Windham & Al-Shehbaz
- Boechera williamsii (Rollins) Dorn
- Boechera xylopoda Windham & Al-Shehbaz
- Boechera yorkii S.Boyd – Last Chance rockcress
