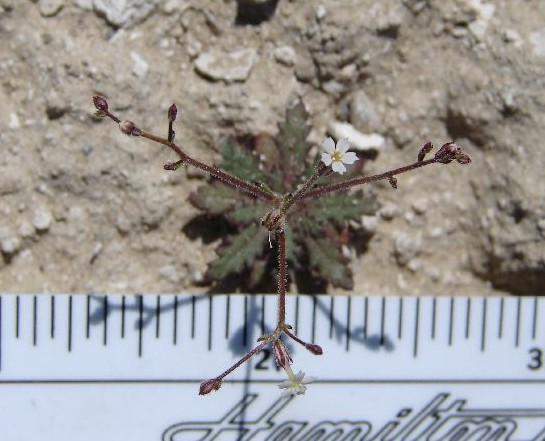

Conservation status
- Secure (NatureServe)

Scientific classification
- Kingdom: Plantae
- Clade: Tracheophytes
- Clade: Angiosperms
- Clade: Eudicots
- Clade: Asterids
- Order: Ericales
- Family: Polemoniaceae
- Genus: Aliciella
- Species: A. leptomeria

Binomial name
- Aliciella leptomeria (A.Gray) J.M.Porter

Synonyms
- Gilia leptomeria; Navarretia leptomeria

= Aliciella leptomeria =

Plant species in the phlox family

Aliciella leptomeria (formerly Gilia leptomeria) is a species of flowering plant in the phlox family known by the common names sand gilia and Great Basin gilia. It is native to the Western United States, where it grows in many types of habitat, such as the sagebrush of the Great Basin and in the Mojave Desert.

It is a small herb producing a thin, branching stem up to about 23 centimeters tall. It is coated in glandular hairs. Several deeply lobed leaves 1 to 6 centimeters long are located in a basal rosette at ground level around the stem. There are smaller, unlobed leaves along the stem. The inflorescence produces one to three flowers, each about half a centimeter wide with a thread-thin tube. The corolla is purple-stained white, the throat is yellowish, and the tube is purple.

== Taxonomy ==
In 1870 the botanist Asa Gray scientifically described a species that he named Gilia leptomeria. In 1998 James Mark Porter moved it to the genus Aliciella giving the species its accepted name, Aliciella leptomeria. It has no subspecies and has three synonyms.

Table of Synonyms
Name	Year	Rank	Notes
Gilia inconspicua var. dentiflora Davidson	1926	variety	= het.
Gilia leptomeria A.Gray	1870	species	≡ hom.
Navarretia leptomeria (A.Gray) Kuntze	1891	species	≡ hom.
Notes: ≡ homotypic synonym; = heterotypic synonym
