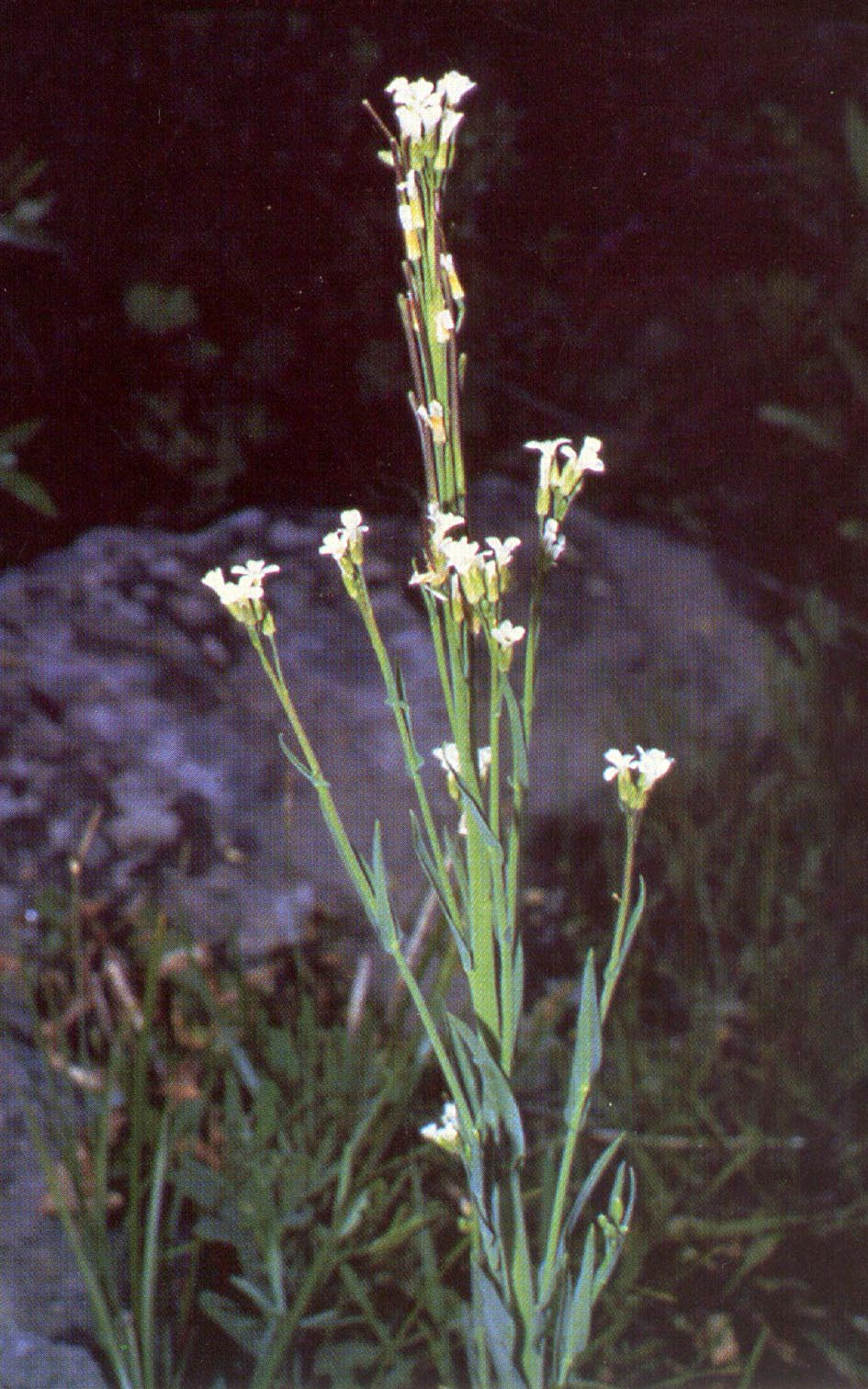

Scientific classification
- Kingdom: Plantae
- Clade: Tracheophytes
- Clade: Angiosperms
- Clade: Eudicots
- Clade: Rosids
- Order: Brassicales
- Family: Brassicaceae
- Genus: Boechera
- Species: B. stricta

Binomial name
- Boechera stricta (A.Gray) Á.Löve & D.Löve

Synonyms
- Arabis drummondii Boechera drummondii Turritis stricta

= Boechera stricta =

Species of flowering plant

Boechera stricta (syn. Arabis drummondii, Boechera drummondii, Turritis stricta) is a species of flowering plant in the mustard family known by the common name Drummond's rockcress. It is native to much of North America, including most of Canada, and the western and northeastern United States.

== Habitat and description ==
It is a biennial or perennial herb growing one or more erect stems from a small caudex. The stems may branch near the top and reach heights anywhere between 30 and 90 centimeters. They are generally not hairy. There is a basal clump of widely lance-shaped leaves about the caudex, each up to 8 centimeters long. There are also widely spaced leaves along the stem. The top of the stem is occupied by a narrow inflorescence of flowers which are usually white, but sometimes light pink. The fruit is a straight, erect silique up to 10 centimeters long containing two rows of winged seeds.
