= I. spicata =

I. spicata may refer to:

- Indigofera spicata, a plant species
- Inquisitor spicata, a sea snail species
- Ipomopsis spicata, the spiked ipomopsis, a flowering plant species in the genus Ipomopsis

== See also ==
- The dictionary definition of Spicata at Wiktionary
