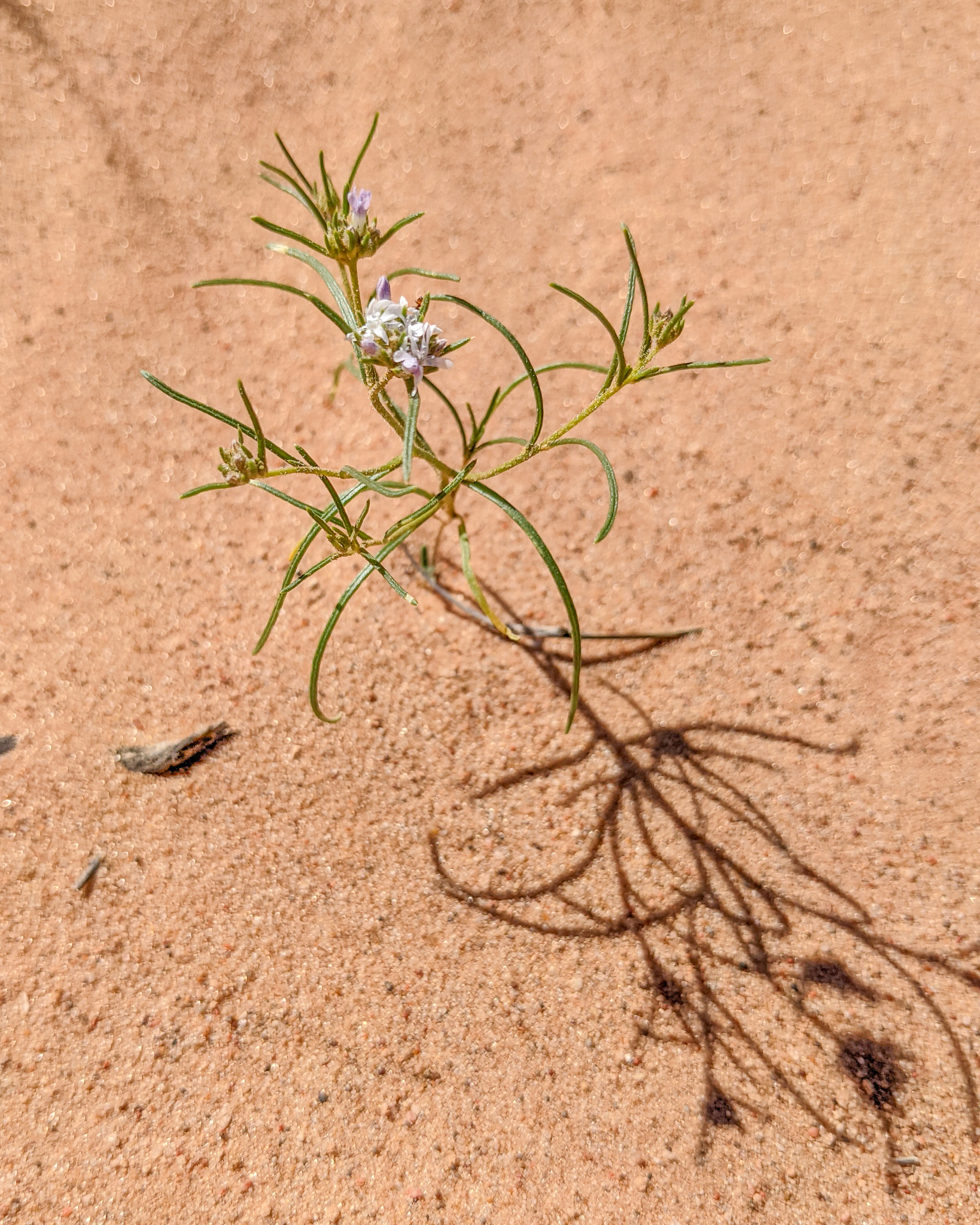
- Goblin Valley State Park, Utah

Scientific classification
- Kingdom: Plantae
- Clade: Tracheophytes
- Clade: Angiosperms
- Clade: Eudicots
- Clade: Asterids
- Order: Ericales
- Family: Polemoniaceae
- Genus: Ipomopsis
- Species: I. gunnisonii

Binomial name
- Ipomopsis gunnisonii (Torr. & A.Gray) V.E.Grant

Synonyms
- Gilia gunnisonii; Navarretia gunnisonii

= Ipomopsis gunnisonii =

Plant species in the phlox family

Ipomopsis gunnisonii, the sand-dune skyrocket, sand-dune gilia, or Gunnison gilia, is a small herbaceous plant that grows annually in sandy areas of the Four Corners Region and westward into Arizona and Utah. Together with its genus it is part of the phlox family.

== Description ==
Sand-dune skyrocket is a herbaceous plant that grows as an annual or winter annual. The stem can be unbranched or branch near the base and will grow to between 3 to 30 centimeters (1.2–11.8 in) tall. The stems and leaves can be hairless, hairy, or covered in glandular hairs, though it is much more often glandular than simply hairy.

The leaves are attached to the stems and measure 0.5 to 4 centimeters long with a width of just 0.5 to 1.2 millimeters. They are narrow and grass-like with smooth edges or with two or four side lobes, the lobes as much as 2 mm long.

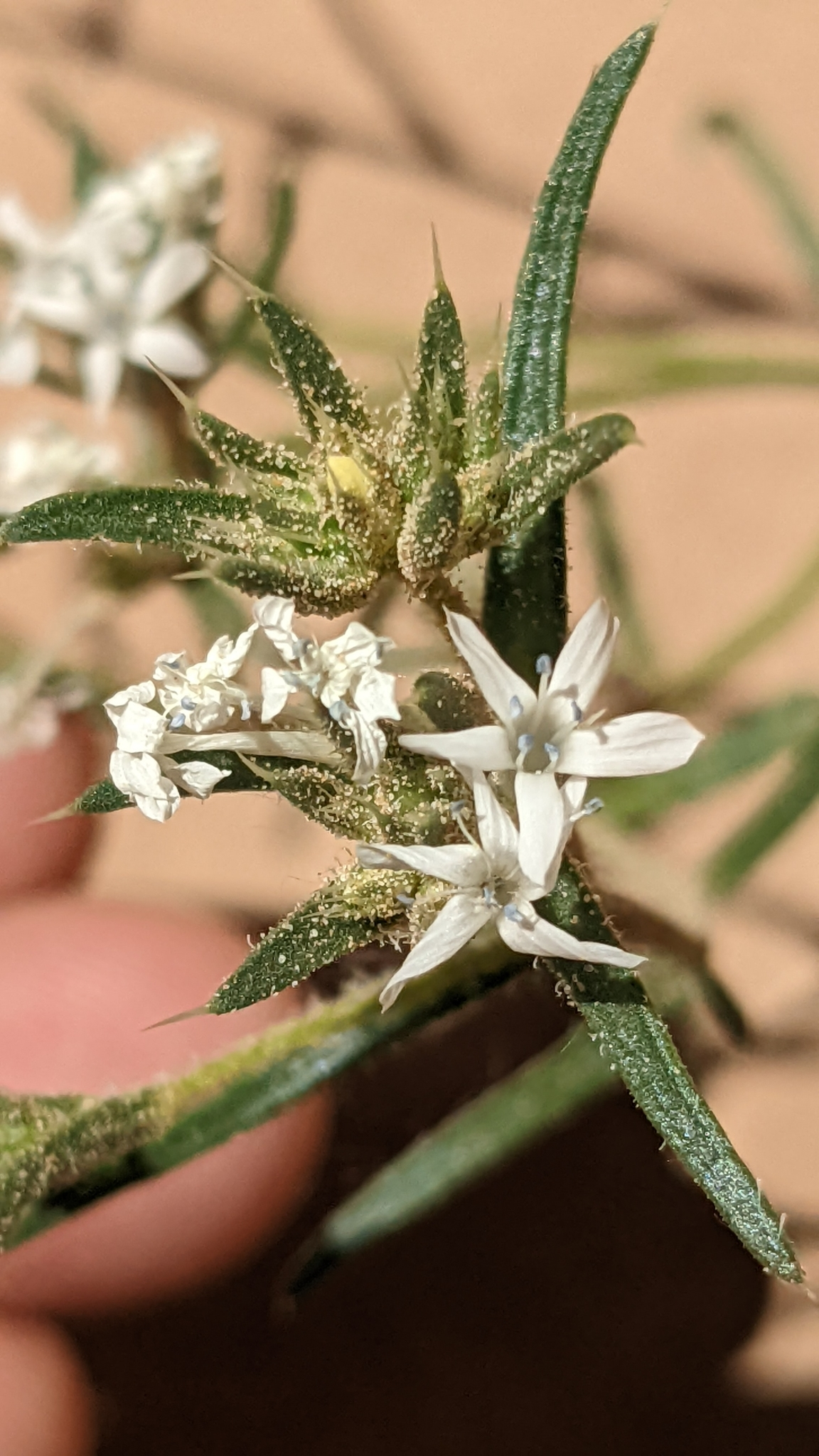
Flowers, Paria River Canyon, Vermilion Cliffs National Monument

The flowers of the sand-dune skyrocket are pale-lavender to white trumpets that open into five lobes resembling petals. The flower is 6–10mm mm long with stamens that can all be of the same length or different lengths and contained within the flora tube or extending out of the flower's mouth. The sepals are partly fused with lobes that are tipped with spines, shorter than the floral tube at 3.5–4.5 mm long. The flowers are in clusters at the ends of the stem branches that are more or less have associated bracts. Though the flowers are not very striking, the plants sometimes create a showy display by growing together in large numbers on bare, red, desert sands.

The fruit is a capsule that is 2.5–3.5 mm long with one or two seeds in each cavity. Most of the seeds are 1.5–2.5 mm long.

== Taxonomy ==
In 1854 John Torrey and Asa Gray published the scientific description of a species they named Gilia gunnisonii. The type specimen was collected by Frederick Kreutzfeldt on a sandy bank of the Green River in Utah during the Gunnison–Beckwith expedition in 1853, during which he and Gunnison were later killed. The botanist Otto Kuntze published a description of the species that moved it to Navarretia in 1891, but the accepted name was created in 1956 by Verne Grant when he moved it to the genus Ipomopsis. However, as late as 1987 scientific works on botany continued to use the name Gilia gunnisonii in preference to Ipomopsis gunnisonii. Together with its genus it is classified in the Polemoniaceae family. It has no subspecies or varieties. It is very similar to Ipomopsis pumila and grows in similar habitats with some range overlap, but there is no evidence of hybridization between the two species.

=== Names ===
Its scientific name, gunnisonii, refers to the surveyor John W. Gunnison. The species is known by the common names sand-dune skyrocket, sand-dune gilia, sand dune ipomopsis, and sanddune ipomopsis. Similar to its scientific name it is also called Gunnison standing-cypress, Gunnison gilia, and Gunnison's gilia.

== Range and habitat ==
Sand-dune skyrocket is native to four western US states, Arizona, Utah, New Mexico, and Colorado. In Arizona it grows in northern parts of the state in the canyon lands, as far west as Coconino and Yavapai counties and in Navajo and Apache counties in the east. It grows widely in the south and east of Utah in Kane, Garfield, Wayne, San Juan, Emery, and Grand counties. In New Mexico and Colorado it only grows in one county in each state, San Juan County, New Mexico and Montezuma County, Colorado. It can be found at elevations of as low as 1,125 meters (3,700 ft) in Utah, and up to 2,200 meters (7,200 ft).

It almost never grows on anything but sandy or very sandy soils and noted for growing on sand dunes. It grows in sagebrush scrub and other desert shrublands with shadscale and purple sage and pinyon–juniper woodlands.
