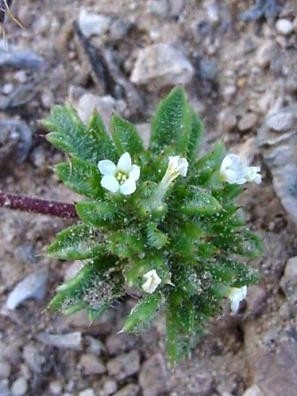

Conservation status
- Apparently Secure (NatureServe)

Scientific classification
- Kingdom: Plantae
- Clade: Embryophytes
- Clade: Tracheophytes
- Clade: Spermatophytes
- Clade: Angiosperms
- Clade: Eudicots
- Clade: Asterids
- Order: Ericales
- Family: Polemoniaceae
- Genus: Ipomopsis
- Species: I. polycladon

Binomial name
- Ipomopsis polycladon (Torr.) V.E.Grant

Synonyms
- Gilia polycladon; Navarretia polycladon

= Ipomopsis polycladon =

Plant species in the phlox family

Ipomopsis polycladon is a species of flowering plant in the phlox family known by the common name manybranched ipomopsis. It is native to much of the western United States and northern Mexico, where it grows in sandy soils such as those of the deserts. This is an annual herb producing a number of horizontal red stems extending outward from the short central stem. Leaves appear at the ends and axils of branches. Each leaf is multilobed, and mostly green but often red-tipped, and less than 2 centimeters long. Stems and leaves are covered with woolly glandular hairs. The long stem branches bear inflorescences of leaflike bracts which are green with sharp-pointed red tips, and tiny white flowers a few millimeters across.

== Taxonomy ==
When Ipomopsis polycladon was scientifically described it was placed in Gilia by John Torrey in 1859. The botanist Otto Kuntze proposed moving it to Navarretia in 1891 and Verne Grant placed it in Ipomopsis in 1956, giving the species its accepted name. Together with its genus it is part of the Polemoniaceae family and the species has no accepted varieties, but one named mexicana was proposed by August Brand in 1907. This gives the species a total of three synonyms.

Table of Synonyms
| Name | Year | Rank | Notes |
|---|---|---|---|
| Gilia polycladon Torr. | 1859 | species | ≡ hom. |
| Gilia polycladon var. mexicana Brand | 1907 | variety | = het. |
| Navarretia polycladon (Torr.) Kuntze | 1891 | species | ≡ hom. |
Notes: ≡ homotypic synonym; = heterotypic synonym
