= Ipomopsis macombii =

Conservation status
- Apparently Secure (NatureServe)

Scientific classification
- Kingdom: Plantae
- Clade: Tracheophytes
- Clade: Angiosperms
- Clade: Eudicots
- Clade: Asterids
- Order: Ericales
- Family: Polemoniaceae
- Genus: Ipomopsis
- Species: I. macombii

Binomial name
- Ipomopsis macombii (Torr. ex A.Gray) V.E.Grant

Synonyms
- Navarretia macombii (Torr. ex A.Gray) Kuntze; Gilia calothyrsa I.M.Johnst.; Gilia macombii Torr. ex A.Gray; Gilia macombii var. pringlei Brand

Species of plant

Ipomopsis macombii is a species of flowering plant in the family Polemoniaceae. Its common name is Macomb's skyrocket or Macomb's standing-cypress. It is a perennial plant native to the southwestern United States and northern Mexico.

== Description ==
Flowers of Ipomopsis macombii are tubular with five petals at the end and with blueish stamens that extend shortly from the opening. Flowers are purple and spotted with darker purple.

== Range ==
It is native to Arizona and southwestern New Mexico in the southwestern United States, and to the states of Chihuahua and Sonora in northern Mexico.

Ipomopsis macombii grows in several protected areas, including Coronado National Forest (many areas, including Chiricahua Wilderness), Chiricahua National Monument, Southwestern Research Station (American Museum of Natural History), and San Rafael State Park in Arizona. In New Mexico it is known from Gila Cliff Dwellings National Monument, Gila National Forest, and Coronado National Forest. In Sonora it grows on land protected by the Bavispe Flora and Fauna Protection Area and the Cuenca Los Ojos Foundation.

== Habitat ==
Ipomopsis maccombii is native to interior mountains, including sky islands in southwestern New Mexico (4,000–6,500 feet (1,200–2,000 m)), the Mogollon Mountains and sky islands of southeastern Arizona (4,000–8,000 feet (1,200–2,400 m), and the northern Sierra Madre Occidental of northeastern Sonora and northwestern Chihuahua. It grows in pinyon juniper woodlands, montane conifer forests, and rocky slopes.
