= Bush Head =

Summit in Coconino County, Arizona, US

- Location within Arizona

Highest point
- Elevation: 6,033 ft (1,839 m) NAVD 88
- Listing: Mountains of Arizona
- Coordinates: 36°55′29″N 111°43′19″W

Geography
- Location: Coconino County, Arizona, U.S.
- Parent range: Colorado Plateau
- Topo map: USGS Water Pockets

Bush Head is a summit in the Coconino County, Arizona. It is about 10 miles (16 km) southeast of Buckskin Gulch and located on the Paria Plateau west of the Paria River in the Vermilion Cliffs National Monument.
