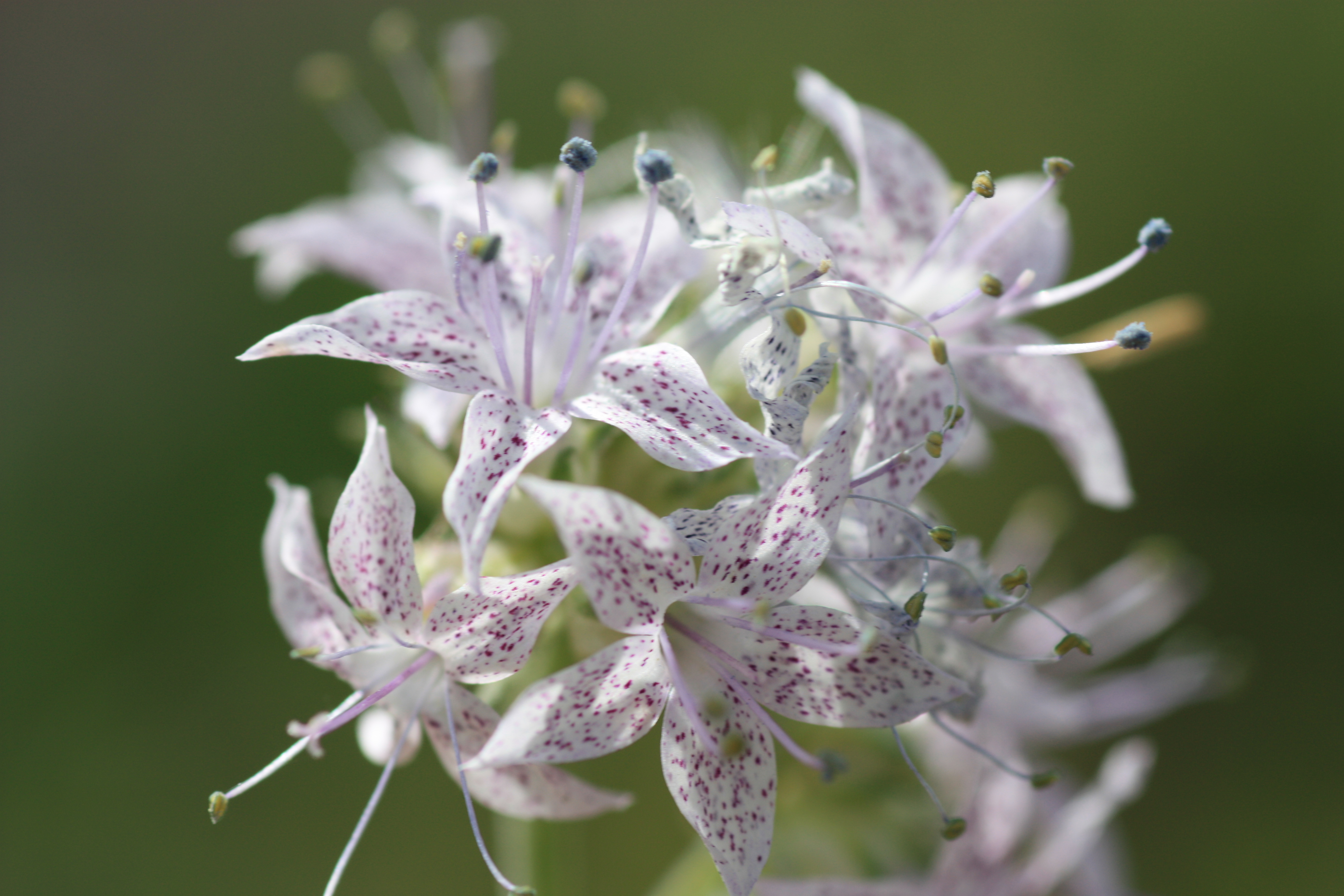
- The Pagosa skyrocket

Conservation status
- Critically Imperiled (NatureServe)

Scientific classification
- Kingdom: Plantae
- Clade: Embryophytes
- Clade: Tracheophytes
- Clade: Spermatophytes
- Clade: Angiosperms
- Clade: Eudicots
- Clade: Asterids
- Order: Ericales
- Family: Polemoniaceae
- Genus: Ipomopsis
- Species: I. polyantha

Binomial name
- Ipomopsis polyantha (Rydb.) V.E.Grant

Synonyms
- Gilia polyantha

= Ipomopsis polyantha =

Plant species in the phlox family

Ipomopsis polyantha is a rare species of flowering plant in the phlox family known by the common names Pagosa ipomopsis, Pagosa skyrocket and Archuleta County standing-cypress. It is endemic to Colorado in the United States, where it occurs only in the vicinity of Pagosa Springs in Archuleta County. It is threatened by the loss of its habitat to residential and commercial development. It was federally listed as an endangered species in 2011.

This plant is a biennial herb that grows 30 to 60 cm (12 to 24 in) tall. The stem is coated in glandular hairs. The leaves are deeply divided into narrow linear lobes. Flowers occur in the leaf axils and at the top of the stem. Each flower is a centimeter long. It is white in color with tiny purple dots, sometimes so many that they give the flower a purplish tint. The stamens protrude from the flower's throat and are tipped with blue pollen that turns yellow as the flower matures. The flowers are pollinated by bees, especially the honey bee (Apis mellifera) and species of metallic green bees (Augochlorella spp.), bumblebees (Bombus spp.), and digger bees (Anthophora spp.).

== Taxonomy ==
The botanist Per Axel Rydberg published the first description of this species in 1904 as part of the genus Gilia named Gilia polyantha. It was moved to Ipomopsis in 1956 by Verne Grant. Together with its genus Ipomopsis polyantha is classified in the Polemoniaceae family and has no other botanical synonyms.

== Range and habitat ==
The plant is limited to a specific soil type derived from the Mancos Shale. It grows as a pioneer species on sparsely vegetated shale substrates and as a climax species in Ponderosa pine and oak forests. Today its habitat is disturbed by grazing livestock.

There are only two known occurrences of this plant, separated by about 21 kilometres (13 miles). One is on the southeastern edge of Pagosa Springs straddling U.S. Route 84 near the junction with U.S. Route 160. The other occurrence is along Route 160, about 16 km (9.9 mi) west of Pagosa Springs. There are an estimated 162,220 individual plants.

This species is threatened with direct mortality and loss of habitat as the human population of Archuleta County swells. The occurrence nearest to Pagosa Springs is on land zoned for commercial expansion. All the private land which hosts the plant is slated for development, mainly of housing. More land nearby will be affected by associated development activities, such as the construction of roads and utilities such as power lines. About 9% of the plant's habitat is on highway right-of-ways which are affected by herbicide application and the introduction of groundcover, such as exotic grasses. About 86% of the plant's habitat will likely be affected by development within 10 years.
