= Ipomopsis macrosiphon =

Scientific classification
- Kingdom: Plantae
- Clade: Embryophytes
- Clade: Tracheophytes
- Clade: Angiosperms
- Clade: Eudicots
- Clade: Asterids
- Order: Ericales
- Family: Polemoniaceae
- Genus: Ipomopsis
- Species: I. macrosiphon

Binomial name
- Ipomopsis macrosiphon (Kearney & Peebles) V.E.Grant & Wilken

Synonyms
- Gilia aggregata var. macrosiphon Kearney & Peebles; Gilia tenuituba f. macrosiphon (Kearney & Peebles) Wherry; Ipomopsis aggregata var. macrosiphon (Kearney & Peebles) Dorn; Ipomopsis tenuituba subsp. macrosiphon (Kearney & Peebles) V.E.Grant & Wilken

Species of flowering plant

Ipomopsis macrosiphon, the longtube ipomopsis, is a species of herb native to Arizona.

== Description ==
Ipomopsis macrosiphon is a perennial herb. It grows 40 to 80cm tall, with woody stems towards the base. The leaves are deeply lobed and the flowers are white, salmon, or pink, with purple speckles.

== Range ==
Ipomopsis macrosiphon is found in the Southwestern United States. It is only known to occur in three sky island mountains.

== Habitat ==
Ipomopsis macrosiphon is found in high montane regions.

== Ecology ==
Bees and hummingbirds are pollinators of Ipomopsis.

== Taxonomy ==
Ipomopsis macrosiphon was originally classified as a subspecies of Ipomopsis tenuituba. However, DNA research showed that they were not as closely related to each other as they were to other Ipomopsis species. Ipomopsis macrosiphon was then reclassified as its own distinct species.
