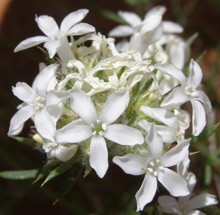

Conservation status
- Secure (NatureServe)

Scientific classification
- Kingdom: Plantae
- Clade: Embryophytes
- Clade: Tracheophytes
- Clade: Spermatophytes
- Clade: Angiosperms
- Clade: Eudicots
- Clade: Asterids
- Order: Ericales
- Family: Polemoniaceae
- Genus: Ipomopsis
- Species: I. congesta

Binomial name
- Ipomopsis congesta (Hook.) V.E.Grant

Subspecies and varieties
- I. c. subsp. congesta; I. c. subsp. crebrifolia; I. c. subsp. frutescens; I. c. var. goodrichii; I. c. subsp. matthewii; I. c. subsp. montana; I. c. subsp. nevadensis; I. c. var. ochroleuca; I. c. subsp. palmifrons; I. c. subsp. pseudotypica; I. c. subsp. viridis

Synonyms
- List: Gilia burleyana; Gilia congesta; Gilia congesta var. burleyana; Gilia congesta var. crebrifolia; Gilia congesta var. frutescens; Gilia congesta subsp. iberidifolia; Gilia congesta var. merrillii; Gilia congesta var. montana; Gilia congesta var. nuda; Gilia congesta subsp. palmifrons; Gilia congesta var. palmifrons; Gilia congesta var. paniculata; Gilia congesta var. pseudotypica; Gilia congesta var. viridis; Gilia crebrifolia; Gilia frutescens; Gilia iberidifolia; Gilia merrillii; Gilia montana; Gilia nevadensis; Gilia nuda; Gilia palmifrons; Gilia spergulifolia; Ipomopsis congesta var. crebrifolia; Ipomopsis congesta var. frutescens; Ipomopsis congesta var. montana; Ipomopsis congesta var. nevadensis; Ipomopsis congesta var. palmifrons; Ipomopsis congesta var. pseudotypica; Ipomopsis congesta var. viridis; Ipomopsis crebrifolia; Ipomopsis frutescens; Navarretia congesta; Navarretia iberidifolia; Phacelia furcata

= Ipomopsis congesta =

Plant species in the phlox family

Ipomopsis congesta is a species of flowering plant in the phlox family, commonly called ballhead skyrocket. It is native to much of western North America, where it grows in many habitats from alpine peaks to low-elevation scrub. It is a perennial herb which varies in appearance, especially across subspecies and climates. It may take the form of a squat patch with stems under 10 centimeters in height or a more erect form up to 30 centimeters tall. The stems are often hairy to woolly. The thick leaves are usually fork-shaped with a number of clawlike lobes and 1 to 4 centimeters long. The flowers appear in a rounded, dense cluster atop the stem. Each flower is bell-shaped to funnel-shaped and white with a pale yellow throat and protruding yellow or white stamens. There are several subspecies, many of which were formerly considered species of Gilia.

== Taxonomy ==
The botanist William Jackson Hooker described a new species in the genus Gilia in 1837, which he gave the name Gilia congesta. In 1956 it was moved to the genus Ipomopsis by Verne Grant. It is classified in the Polemoniaceae family and according to Plants of the World Online has nine subspecies and two varieties.

- Ipomopsis congesta subsp. congesta – Native to Washington to Colorado
- Ipomopsis congesta subsp. crebrifolia – Native to the Rocky Mountain states and Nevada
- Ipomopsis congesta subsp. frutescens – Native to Arizona, New Mexico, Colorado, and Utah
- Ipomopsis congesta var. goodrichii – Native to Utah
- Ipomopsis congesta subsp. matthewii – Native to Arizona, New Mexico, and Colorado
- Ipomopsis congesta subsp. montana – Native to Oregon, Nevada, and California
- Ipomopsis congesta subsp. nevadensis – Native to Nevada
- Ipomopsis congesta var. ochroleuca – Native to Utah
- Ipomopsis congesta subsp. palmifrons – Native to California, Nevada, Oregon, Idaho, and Utah
- Ipomopsis congesta subsp. pseudotypica – Native to Montana, South Dakota, and Wyoming
- Ipomopsis congesta subsp. viridis – Native to Nevada, Oregon, and Idaho

Ipomopsis congesta has 35 synonyms of the species or of eight of its subspecies, including 16 species names.

Table of Synonyms
Name	Year	Synonym of:	Notes
Gilia burleyana A.Nelson	1912	subsp. congesta	= het.
Gilia congesta Hook.	1837	I. congesta	≡ hom.
Gilia crebrifolia Nutt.	1848	subsp. crebrifolia	≡ hom.
Gilia frutescens Rydb.	1913	subsp. frutescens	≡ hom.
Gilia iberidifolia Benth.	1851	subsp. congesta	= het.
Gilia merrillii A.Nelson	1902	subsp. congesta	= het.
Gilia montana A.Nelson & P.B.Kenn.	1906	subsp. montana	≡ hom., nom. illeg. homonym. post.
Gilia nevadensis Tidestr.	1925	subsp. nevadensis	≡ hom.
Gilia nuda (Eastw.) Rydb.	1913	subsp. congesta	= het.
Gilia palmifrons (Brand) Rydb.	1913	subsp. palmifrons	≡ hom.
Gilia spergulifolia Rydb.	1904	subsp. congesta	= het.
Ipomopsis crebrifolia (Nutt.) Dorn	1979	subsp. crebrifolia	≡ hom.
Ipomopsis frutescens (Rydb.) V.E.Grant	1956	subsp. frutescens	≡ hom.
Navarretia congesta (Hook.) Kuntze	1891	I. congesta	≡ hom.
Navarretia iberidifolia (Benth.) Kuntze	1891	subsp. congesta	= het.
Phacelia furcata Douglas ex Hook.	1837	subsp. congesta	= het.
Notes: ≡ homotypic synonym; = heterotypic synonym

== Names ==
In Botanical Latin the species name of congesta means "crowded together", referring to the tightly packed flowers. Ipomopsis congesta is known by the common names ballhead skyrocket, ballhead ipomopsis, ball-head standing-cypress, and ballhead gilia.

== Range ==
Ballhead skyrockets are native to the western United States from as far east as the Dakotas to the Pacific states, a total of 14 states. In the northwest it grows in just Spokane County, Washington, but is common in the counties of southern Oregon and is also found in three counties in the north. To the east in Idaho the species is recorded in the majority of southern counties and in eight of Montana's counties. At the eastern edge of its range it is only native to the westernmost counties of North Dakota, South Dakota, and Nebraska. It has been found in all but three of the counties in Wyoming, but is much more scattered in Colorado and mostly found in the west of the state. In New Mexico and Arizona it is recorded in just two counties in each state, San Juan, Sandoval, Apache, and Navajo, respectively. It is common in both Utah and in Nevada, but is only found at the northeastern edge of California in and to the east of the high Sierra Nevadas and Klamath Mountains.
