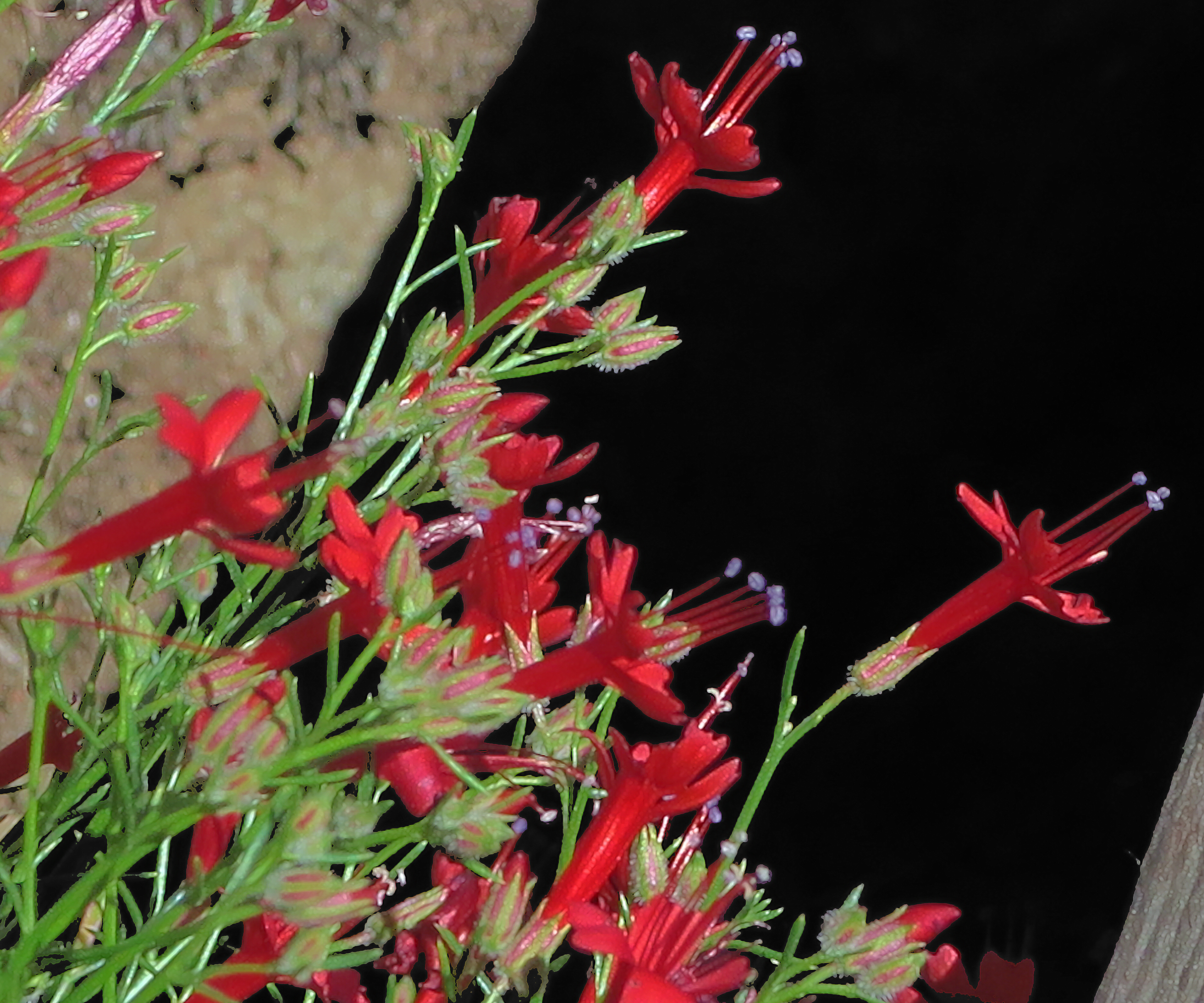

Scientific classification
- Kingdom: Plantae
- Clade: Tracheophytes
- Clade: Angiosperms
- Clade: Eudicots
- Clade: Asterids
- Order: Ericales
- Family: Polemoniaceae
- Genus: Ipomopsis
- Species: I. tenuifolia

Binomial name
- Ipomopsis tenuifolia (A.Gray) V.E.Grant

Synonyms
- Loeselia tenuifolia A.Gray

= Ipomopsis tenuifolia =

Species of flowering plant

Ipomopsis tenuifolia is a species of flowering plant in the phlox family known by the common name slenderleaf skyrocket, or slenderleaf ipomopsis. It is native to Baja California with its range extending just into California and Arizona, where it is a plant of the deserts and chaparral. This is a perennial herb taking the form of a neat clump of slender, erect multibranched stems reaching a maximum height near 40 centimeters. The leaves are narrow to threadlike and occur all along the stem branches. The inflorescences appear at or near the tips of the branches and each holds one to seven bright scarlet flowers. Each flower is a tube 1 to 2 centimeters long opening into a flat or bell-shaped corolla with squared or toothed lobes. The five stamens and one style protrude far out of the mouth of the flower. The stamens have white to purple anthers and the style has three whitish stigmas.
