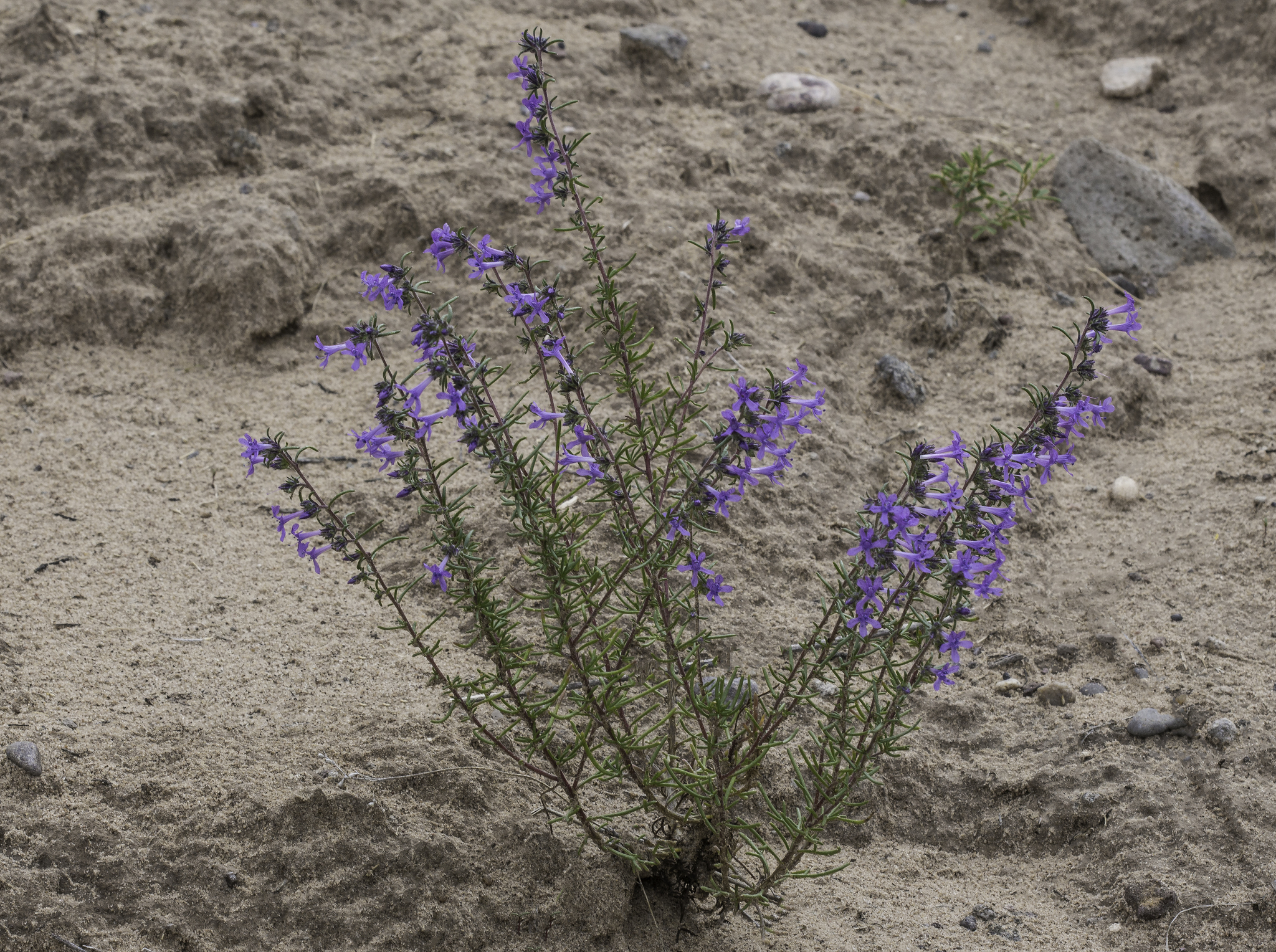
- Santa Fe National Forest, New Mexico

Conservation status
- Apparently Secure (NatureServe)

Scientific classification
- Kingdom: Plantae
- Clade: Embryophytes
- Clade: Tracheophytes
- Clade: Spermatophytes
- Clade: Angiosperms
- Clade: Eudicots
- Clade: Asterids
- Order: Ericales
- Family: Polemoniaceae
- Genus: Ipomopsis
- Species: I. multiflora

Binomial name
- Ipomopsis multiflora (Nutt.) V.E.Grant

Subspecies
- I. m. subsp. brachysiphon; I. m. subsp. multiflora; I. m. subsp. whitingii

Synonyms
- Gilia brachysiphon; Gilia exserta; Gilia multiflora; Navarretia multiflora

= Ipomopsis multiflora =

Plant species in the phlox family

Ipomopsis multiflora, known as manyflowered gilia or manyflowered ipomopsis, is a short-lived perennial flowering plant. Among the Zuni people, the powdered whole plant is applied to face to cure headache, and it is also applied to wounds. The crushed blossoms are smoked in corn husks to "relieve strangulation".

Ipomopsis multiflora grows 15 to 50 cm (6 to 20 in) tall with short and long, glandular and unglandular hairs on its stems.

== Taxonomy ==
In 1848 botanist Thomas Nuttall described a new species in the genus Gilia which he named Gilia multiflora. In 1891 Otto Kuntze proposed moving it to Navarretia, but Verne Grant moved it to Ipomopsis in 1956 giving the species what has become its accepted name of Ipomopsis multiflora. Together with its genus it is classified in the Polemoniaceae family and the species has three accepted subspecies.

- Ipomopsis multiflora subsp. brachysiphon – Native to New Mexico
- Ipomopsis multiflora subsp. multiflora – Native to Arizona, New Mexico, & Colorado
- Ipomopsis multiflora subsp. whitingii – Native to Arizona & New Mexico

Ipomopsis multiflora has eight synonyms of the species or one of its three subspecies.

Table of Synonyms
| Name | Year | Rank | Synonym of: | Notes |
|---|---|---|---|---|
| Gilia brachysiphon Wooton & Standl. | 1913 | species | subsp. brachysiphon | ≡ hom. |
| Gilia exserta A.Nelson | 1905 | species | subsp. multiflora | = het. |
| Gilia multiflora Nutt. | 1848 | species | I. multiflora | ≡ hom. |
| Gilia multiflora var. glabristyla Brand | 1921 | variety | subsp. multiflora | = het. |
| Gilia multiflora var. polyantha Brand | 1907 | variety | subsp. multiflora | = het. |
| Gilia polyantha var. brachysiphon (Wooton & Standl.) Kearney & Peebles | 1943 | variety | subsp. brachysiphon | ≡ hom. |
| Gilia polyantha var. whitingii Kearney & Peebles | 1943 | variety | subsp. whitingii | ≡ hom. |
| Navarretia multiflora (Nutt.) Kuntze | 1891 | species | I. multiflora | ≡ hom. |
Notes: ≡ homotypic synonym; = heterotypic synonym
