= Tyler State Park (Texas) =

State park in Texas, United States

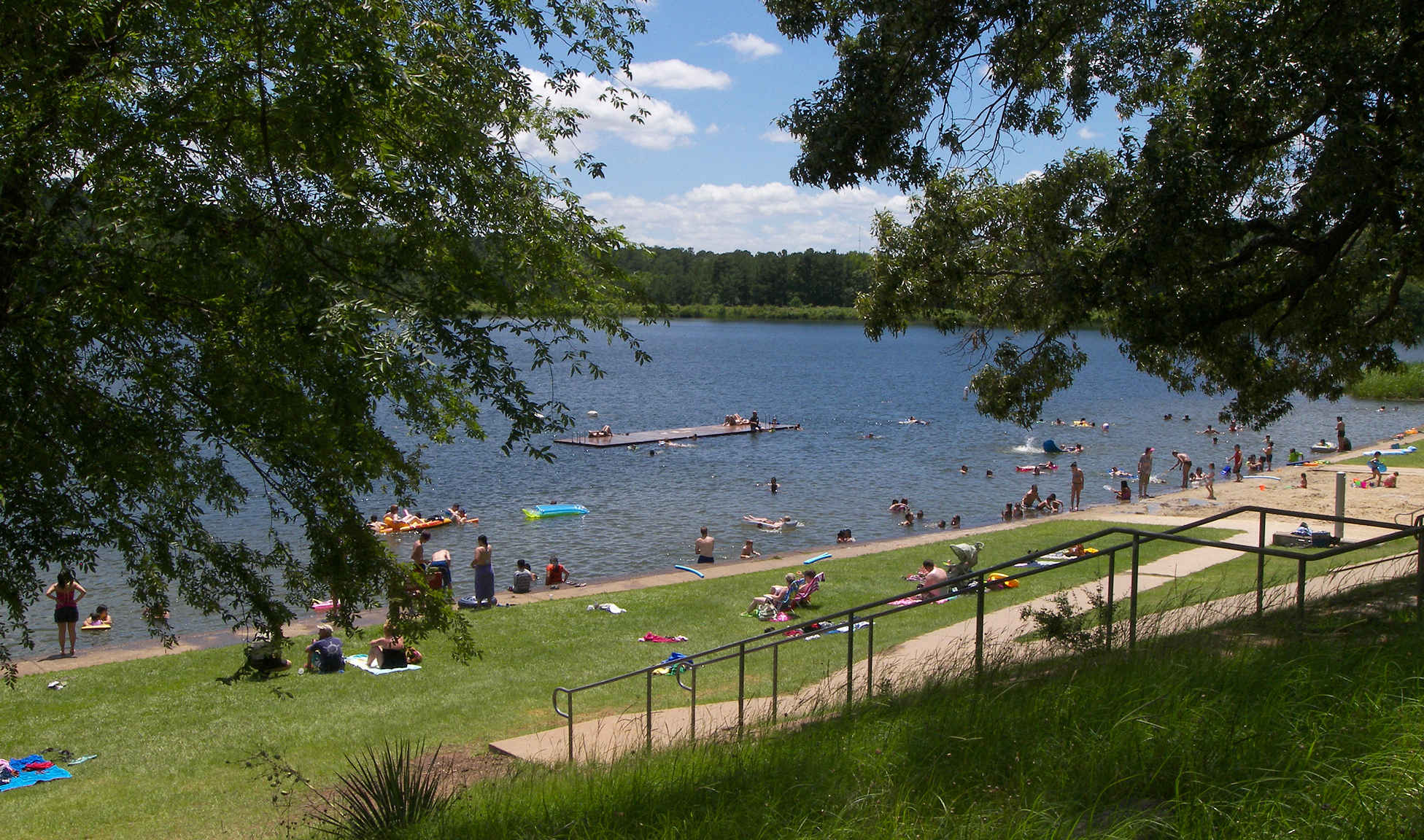
- The swimming area at Tyler State Park Lake.

- Location within Texas
- Location: Smith County, Texas
- Nearest city: Tyler
- Coordinates: 32°28′40″N 95°17′33″W
- Area: 985.5 acres (399 ha)
- Established: 1939
- Visitors: 201,723 (in 2025)
- Governing body: Texas Parks and Wildlife Department
- Website: Official site

Tyler State Park is a 985.5-acre (398.8 ha) state park in Smith County, Texas, United States north of Tyler, Texas. The land was deeded to the state by private owners in 1934 and 1935. Original improvements were made by Civilian Conservation Corps (CCC) Company 2888. The park opened in 1939.

Activities include picnicking; camping; boating (motors allowed - 5 mph (8.0 km/h) speed limit); boat rentals; fishing; birding; hiking; mountain biking; lake swimming (in unsupervised swimming area); and nature study.

== Facilities ==
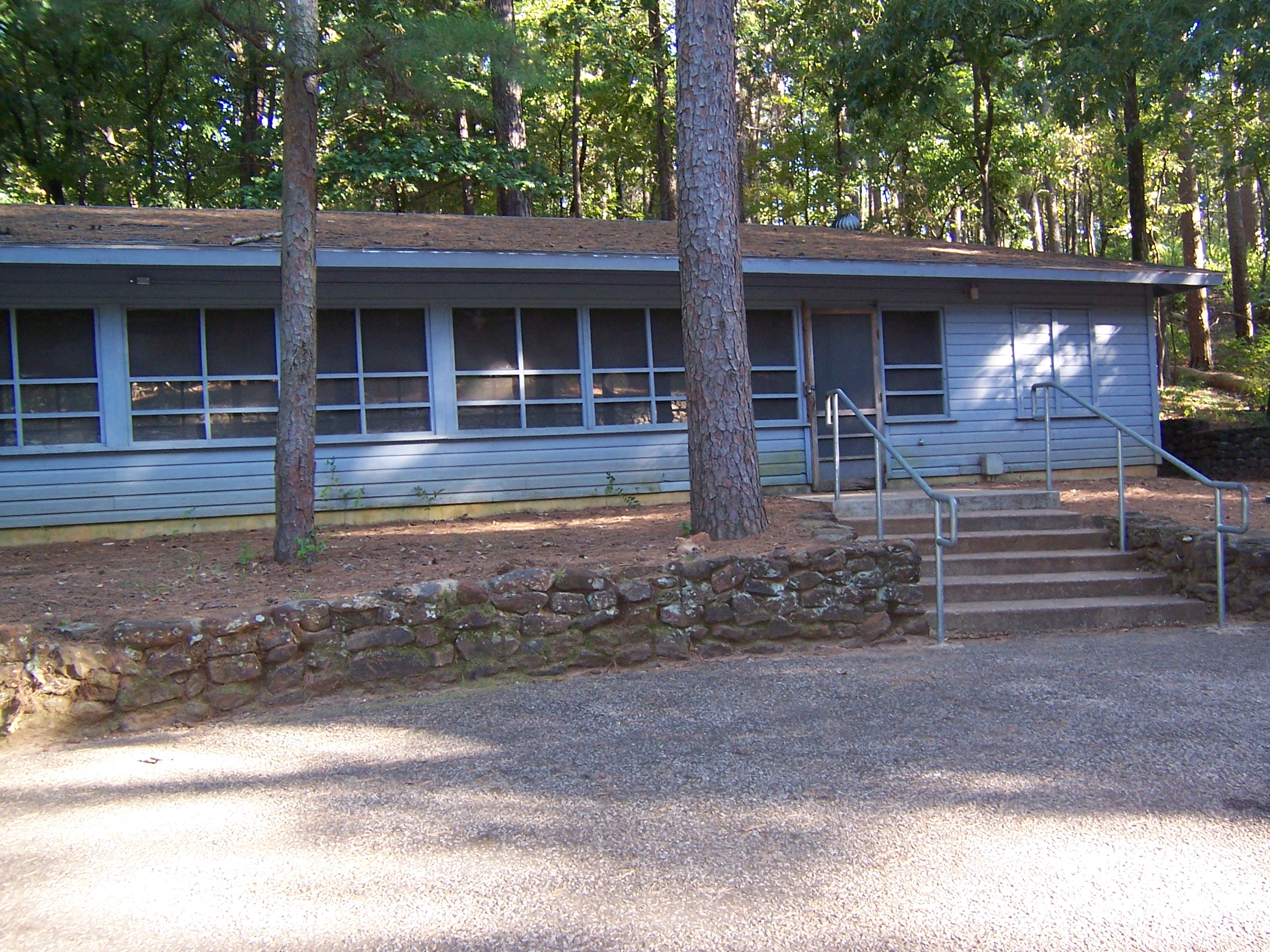
The group shelter at Tyler State Park.

- A 64-acre (26 ha) lake
- Restrooms with and without showers
- Picnic sites (including 3 group picnic areas)
- Campsites with water
- Campsites with water and electricity (pull-through and back-in)
- Campsites with water, electricity, and sewer (pull-through)
- Screened shelters
- A group camp with 6 cabins for overnight use and a dining hall with a full kitchen for day-use only; cabins and dining hall can be rented together or separately.
- Trailer dump stations
- A group dining hall
- A 2.5-mile (4.0 km) hiking trail
- A 13-mile (21 km) mountain bike trail
- A 0.75-mile (1.21 km) nature trail
- An amphitheater on the lake shore
- A seasonal grocery store that sells souvenirs and fishing supplies and rents canoes, paddle boats, kayaks, and fishing boats; a laundry tub; and a concrete launching ramp with a courtesy dock.

== Nature ==
The park has a humid, subtropical climate and receives an average of 44 inches of rain annually. The average temperature is 46 degrees in winter and 80 degrees in summer. The park is in the Sabine River Basin. The outflow from Tyler State Park Lake eventually makes its way to the Sabine River.

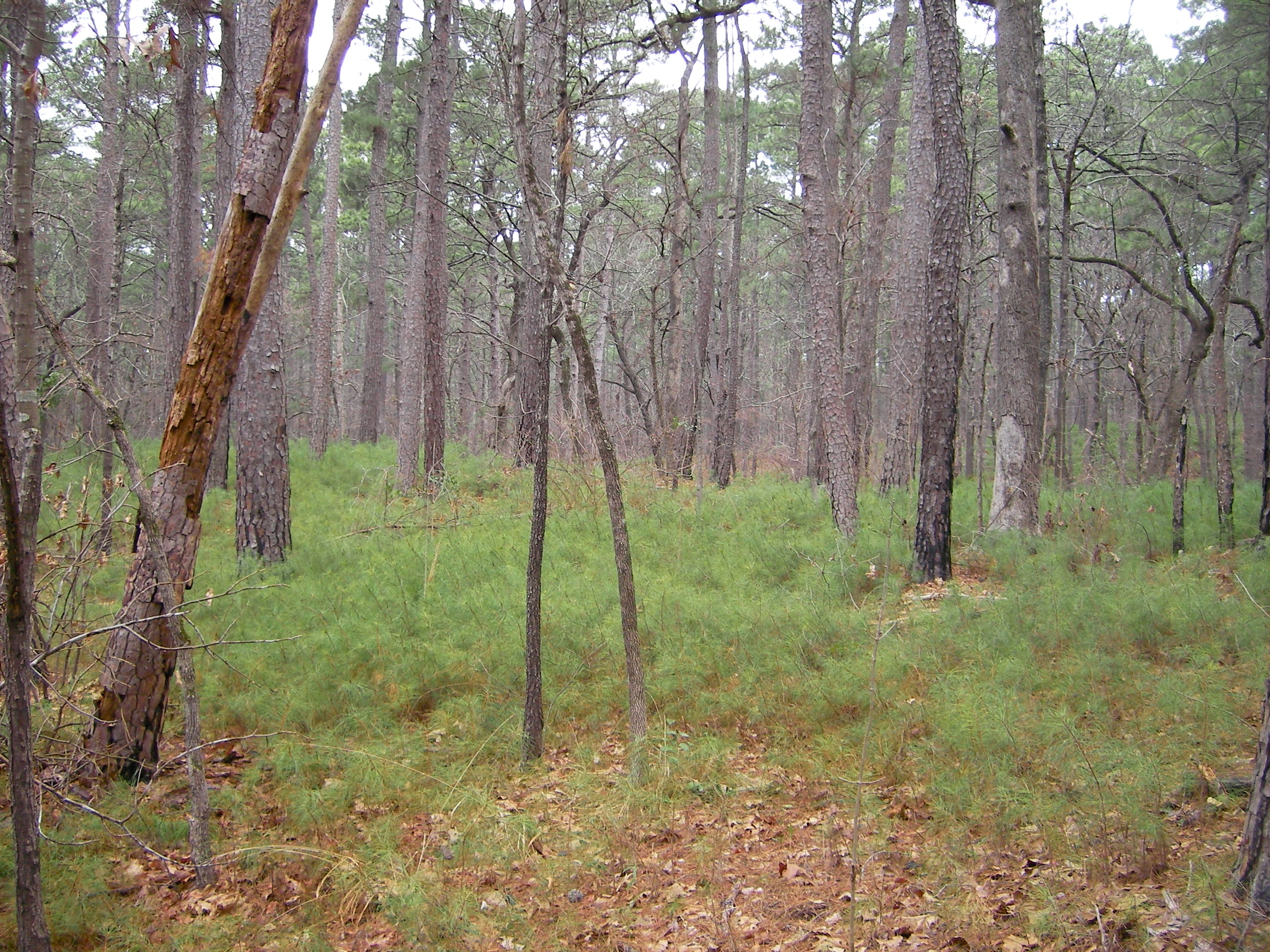
Pine forest at Tyler State Park

=== Plants ===
Situated in the western Piney Woods near the Southern Post Oak Savannah ecoregions, vegetation from both habitats is found in the park. Shortleaf pine and loblolly pine are the tallest trees in the park. Other tree species found in the park include southern red oak, post oak, blackjack oak, black oak, bluejack oak water oak, sweetgum, eastern red cedar, pecan, mockernut hickory, sassafras, black walnut, sugarberry, cockspur hawthorn, common persimmon, chickasaw plum, mexican plum and slippery elm. Other plants documented in the park are yaupon holly, American beautyberry, standing cypress, rusty blackhaw, wild grape, eastern gamagrass, and little bluestem

=== Animals ===
Mammal species are in the park are characteristic of East Texas; white-tailed deer, eastern gray squirrel, raccoon, Virginia opossum, Mexican long-nosed armadillo, striped skunk and coyote. The Texas rat snake, eastern copperhead and green anole are the most common reptiles encountered. Over 200 species of birds have been identified in the park. The pine warbler, American robin, brown-headed nuthatch, turkey vulture and black vulture can be seen year-round. Popular fish in Tyler State Park include bluegill, channel catfish, largemouth bass and rainbow trout.

== See also ==
- List of Texas state parks
