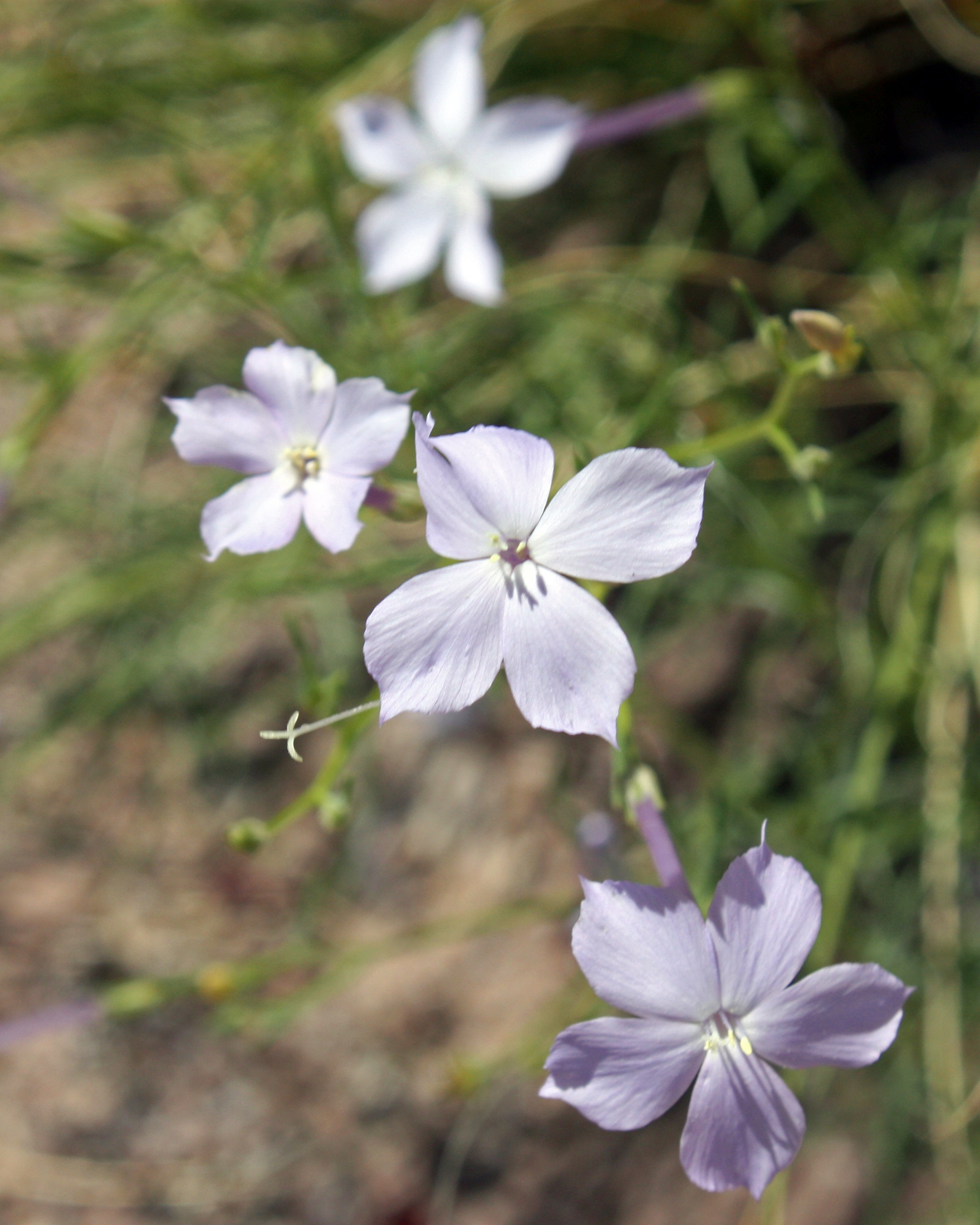

Conservation status
- Secure (NatureServe)

Scientific classification
- Kingdom: Plantae
- Clade: Embryophytes
- Clade: Tracheophytes
- Clade: Spermatophytes
- Clade: Angiosperms
- Clade: Eudicots
- Clade: Asterids
- Order: Ericales
- Family: Polemoniaceae
- Genus: Ipomopsis
- Species: I. longiflora

Binomial name
- Ipomopsis longiflora (Torr.) V.E.Grant

Subspecies
- I. l. subsp. australis; I. l. subsp. longiflora; I. l. subsp. neomexicana

Synonyms
- Batanthes longiflora; Cantua longiflora; Collomia longiflora; Gilia longiflora; Navarretia longiflora; Polemonium candidum

= Ipomopsis longiflora =

Plant species in the phlox family

Ipomopsis longiflora, commonly known as flaxflowered gilia or flaxflowered ipomopsis, is a plant species. The Zuni people utilize the dried, powdered flowers and water of I. longiflora subsp. longiflora to prepare a poultice for removing hair from newborns and children.

== Taxonomy ==
The first scientific description of Ipomopsis longiflora was by John Torrey in 1828; he placed it in the genus Cantua with the name Cantua longiflora. It was moved to the genus Gilia in 1837 by George Don and to Ipomopsis in 1956 by Verne Grant, giving the species its accepted name. Together with its genus it is classified in the Polemoniaceae family and has three accepted subspecies.

- Ipomopsis longiflora subsp. australis – Native to New Mexico, Arizona, & Sonora
- Ipomopsis longiflora subsp. longiflora – Western central US and northern Mexico
- Ipomopsis longiflora subsp. neomexicana – The Four Corners states and Texas

Ipomopsis longiflora has ten synonyms of the species and its three subspecies.

Table of Synonyms
Name	Year	Rank	Synonym of:	Notes
Batanthes longiflora (Torr.) Raf.	1832	species	I. longiflora	≡ hom.
Cantua longiflora Torr.	1828	species	I. longiflora	≡ hom.
Collomia longiflora (Torr.) A.Gray	1870	species	I. longiflora	≡ hom.
Gilia longiflora (Torr.) G.Don	1837	species	I. longiflora	≡ hom.
Gilia longiflora var. laxiflora Brand	1907	variety	subsp. longiflora	= het.
Ipomopsis longiflora var. australis (R.A.Fletcher & W.L.Wagner) B.L.Turner	2003	variety	subsp. australis	≡ hom.
Ipomopsis longiflora var. neomexicana (Wilken) B.L.Turner	2003	variety	subsp. neomexicana	≡ hom.
Navarretia longiflora (Torr.) Kuntze	1891	species	I. longiflora	≡ hom.
Navarretia longiflora var. denverensis Kuntze	1891	variety	subsp. longiflora	= het.
Polemonium candidum Sessé & Moc.	1893	species	subsp. longiflora	= het.
Notes: ≡ homotypic synonym ; = heterotypic synonym
