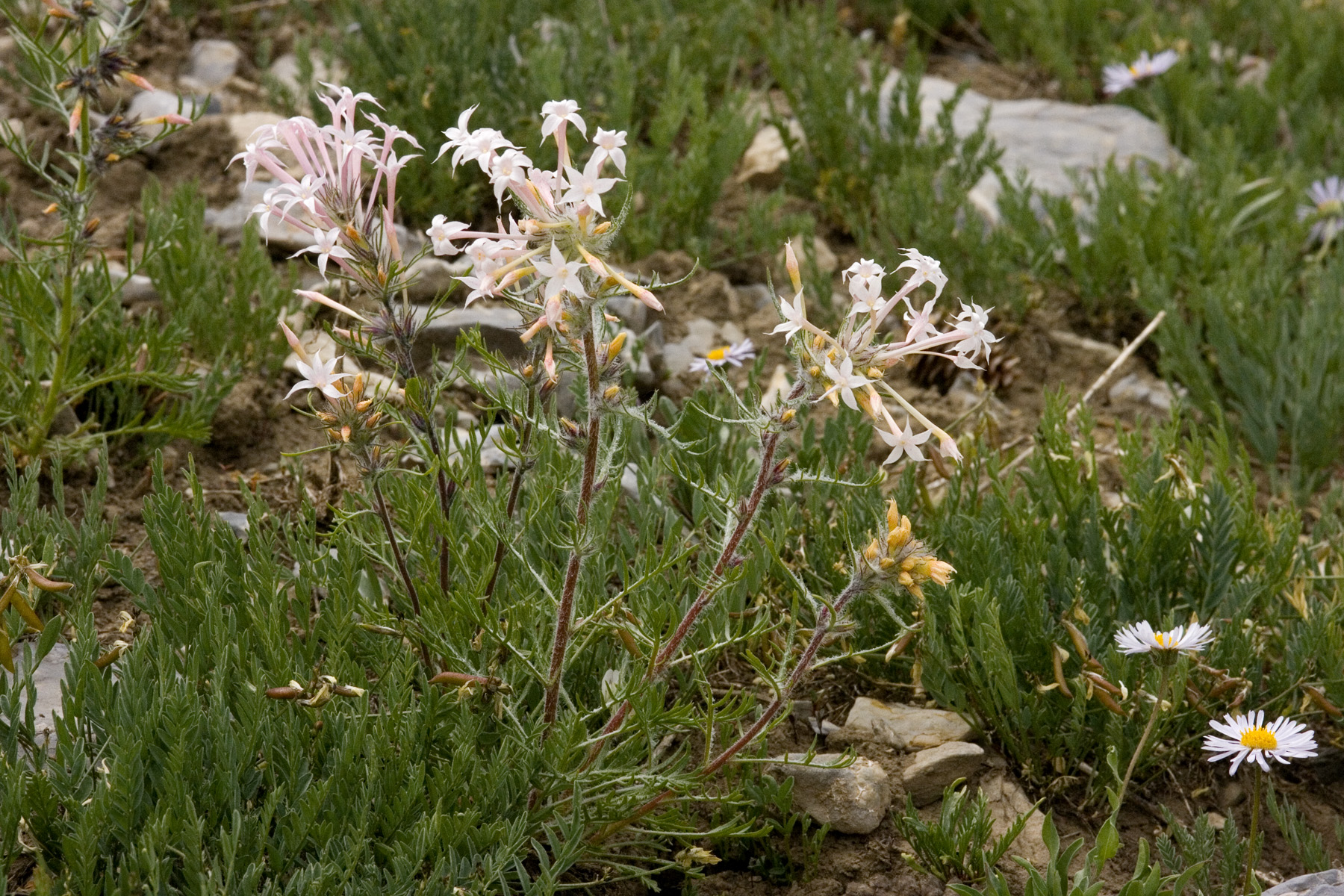

Conservation status
- Apparently Secure (NatureServe)

Scientific classification
- Kingdom: Plantae
- Clade: Embryophytes
- Clade: Tracheophytes
- Clade: Spermatophytes
- Clade: Angiosperms
- Clade: Eudicots
- Clade: Asterids
- Order: Ericales
- Family: Polemoniaceae
- Genus: Ipomopsis
- Species: I. tenuituba

Binomial name
- Ipomopsis tenuituba (Rydb.) V.E.Grant

Subspecies
- I. t. subsp. latiloba; I. t. subsp. tenuituba

Synonyms
- Callisteris violacea; Gilia tenuituba

= Ipomopsis tenuituba =

Plant species in the phlox family

Ipomopsis tenuituba, also known as slendertube skyrocket and slendertube ipomopsis, is a species of flowering plant in the phlox family Polemoniaceae. It is native to much of the western United States from California to Colorado, where it is found on rocky mountain slopes.

== Description ==
Ipomopsis tenuituba is a perennial herb producing an erect stem with widely spaced leaves, each 3 to 6 centimeters long and with many narrow, fingerlike lobes. The inflorescences toward the top of the stem each hold three to seven flowers. The flower is very pale to medium pink, sometimes with white streaks, or solid white. It is a tube 2 to 5 centimeters long, opening into a corolla of five twisting, pointed, ribbonlike lobes. The stamens and style do not protrude far from the mouth of the flower, if at all. While it is a perennial plant, it dies after its first flowering.

== Taxonomy ==
Ipomopsis tenuituba was first described as a species in the Gilia genus named Gilia tenuituba in 1913 by Per Axel Rydberg. In 1956 it was moved to Ipomopsis by Verne Grant, giving the species its accepted name. Along with the genus it is classified in the Polemoniaceae family and has two accepted subspecies.

- Ipomopsis tenuituba subsp. latiloba – Native to Arizona and Utah
- Ipomopsis tenuituba subsp. tenuituba – Native to western US from California to Wyoming

Ipomopsis tenuituba has eight synonyms of the species or one of its two subspecies.

Table of Synonyms
Name	Year	Rank	Synonym of:	Notes
Callisteris violacea Greene	1914	species	subsp. tenuituba	= het.
Gilia aggregata f. utahensis Brand	1907	form	subsp. tenuituba	= het.
Gilia tenuituba Rydb.	1913	species	I. tenuituba	≡ hom.
Gilia tenuituba f. utahensis (Brand) Wherry	1946	form	subsp. tenuituba	= het.
Gilia tenuituba f. violacea (Greene) Wherry	1946	form	subsp. tenuituba	= het.
Ipomopsis aggregata subsp. tenuituba (Rydb.) Ackerf.	2015	subspecies	I. tenuituba	≡ hom.
Ipomopsis aggregata var. tenuituba (Rydb.) Dorn	1992	variety	I. tenuituba	≡ hom.
Ipomopsis tenuituba var. latiloba (V.E.Grant & Wilken) Tiehm	2023	variety	subsp. latiloba	≡ hom.
Notes: ≡ homotypic synonym; = heterotypic synonym
