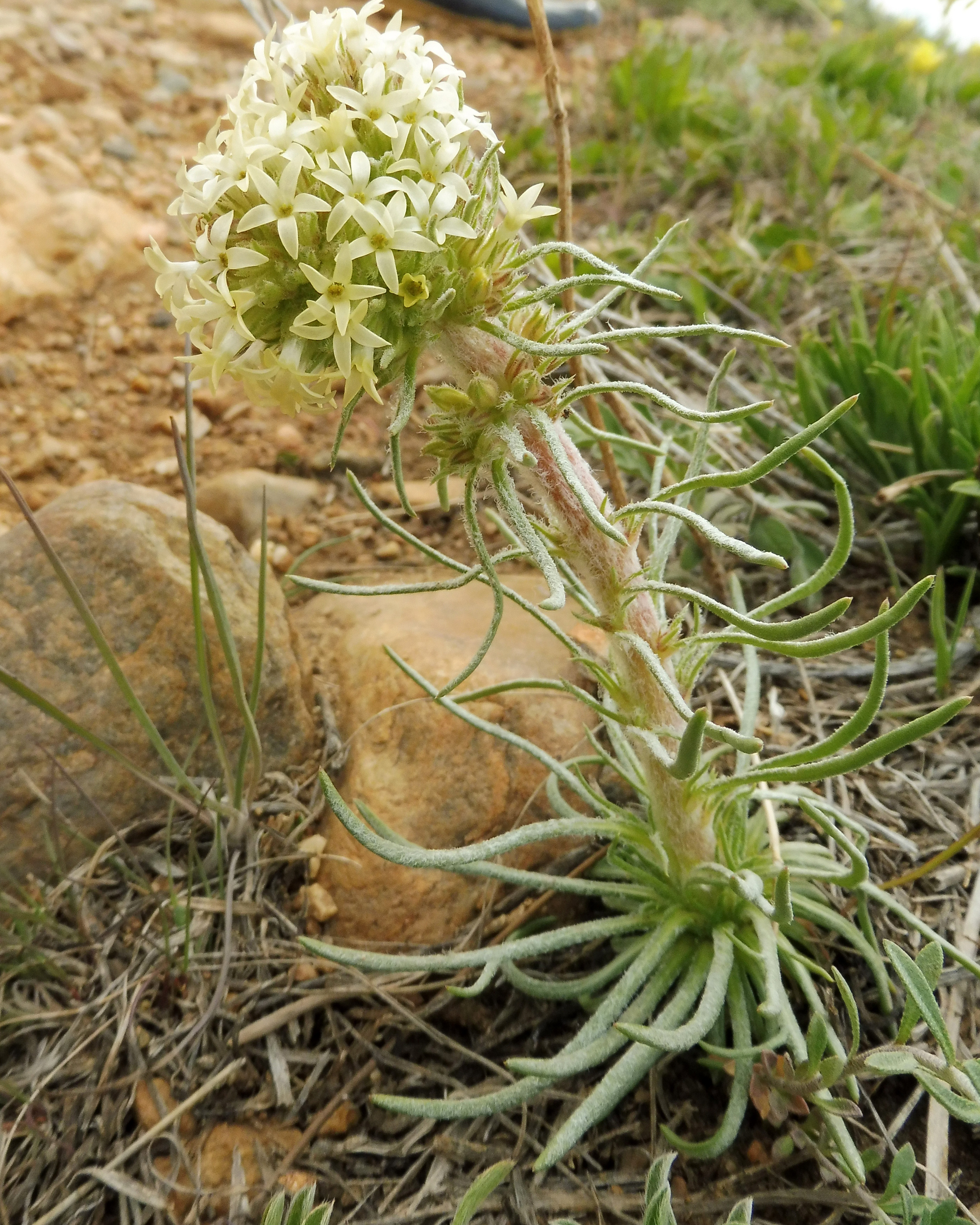
- Ipomopsis spicata subsp. spicata

Conservation status
- Secure (NatureServe)

Scientific classification
- Kingdom: Plantae
- Clade: Embryophytes
- Clade: Tracheophytes
- Clade: Spermatophytes
- Clade: Angiosperms
- Clade: Eudicots
- Clade: Asterids
- Order: Ericales
- Family: Polemoniaceae
- Genus: Ipomopsis
- Species: I. spicata

Binomial name
- Ipomopsis spicata (Nutt.) V.E.Grant

Synonyms
- Gilia cephaloidea; Gilia spicata; Gilia tridactyla; Gilia trifida; Ipomopsis tridactyla; Navarretia spicata

= Ipomopsis spicata =

Plant species in the phlox family

Ipomopsis spicata, commonly known as the spiked ipomopsis, is a species of plant in the phlox family. It is native to the western United States, where it is widespread from the western Great Plains to the Uintah Basin, south to New Mexico and north to Montana. It is found in a variety of habitats, from dry lowlands to above the timberline.

It is a perennial that produces a cream colored flowers in the spring.

== Taxonomy ==
Ipomopsis spicata was scientifically described by Thomas Nuttall in 1848 with the name Gilia spicata, placing it in the genus Gilia. The botanist Otto Kuntze proposed moving it to Navarretia in 1891, but it was finally classified in Ipomopsis by Verne Grant in 1956. Together with it genus it is part of the Polemoniaceae family. This species is highly variable through its range. Due to its occupation of many ecologically distinct and geographically isolated habitats, many subspecies and variety have been named. According to Plants of the World Online it has one accepted variety and five accepted subspecies.

- Ipomopsis spicata subsp. capitata – Endemic to Colorado in the Collegiate Range
- Ipomopsis spicata var. cephaloidea – Native to Montana and Wyoming
- Ipomopsis spicata subsp. orchidacea – Native to Idaho, Montana, and Wyoming
- Ipomopsis spicata subsp. robruthiae – endemic to the Absaroka Range of Wyoming
- Ipomopsis spicata subsp. spicata – widespread in the Rocky Mountains and western Great Plains
- Ipomopsis spicata subsp. tridactyla – endemic to the Markagunt Plateau of Utah

Ipomopsis spicata has 14 synonyms of the species, its variety, and five subspecies in total, though only six are species.

Table of Synonyms
Name	Year	Rank	Synonym of:	Notes
Gilia cephaloidea Rydb.	1897	species	var. cephaloidea	≡ hom.
Gilia congesta var. orchidacea Brand	1913	variety	subsp. orchidacea	≡ hom.
Gilia spicata Nutt.	1848	species	I. spicata	≡ hom.
Gilia spicata var. capitata A.Gray	1870	variety	subsp. capitata	≡ hom.
Gilia spicata var. cephaloidea (Rydb.) Constance & Rollins	1936	variety	var. cephaloidea	≡ hom.
Gilia spicata var. deserta A.Nelson	1899	variety	subsp. spicata	= het.
Gilia spicata var. orchidacea (Brand) Cronquist	1959	variety	subsp. orchidacea	≡ hom.
Gilia spicata var. tridactyla (Rydb.) Constance & Rollins	1936	variety	subsp. tridactyla	≡ hom.
Gilia tridactyla Rydb.	1917	species	subsp. tridactyla	≡ hom.
Gilia trifida Nutt.	1848	species	subsp. spicata	= het.
Ipomopsis spicata var. orchidacea (Brand) Dorn	1988	variety	subsp. orchidacea	≡ hom.
Ipomopsis spicata var. robruthiae (Wilken & R.L.Hartm.) Dorn	1992	variety	subsp. robruthiae	≡ hom.
Ipomopsis tridactyla (Rydb.) S.L.Welsh	2003	species	subsp. tridactyla	≡ hom.
Navarretia spicata (Nutt.) Kuntze	1891	species	I. spicata	≡ hom.
Notes: ≡ homotypic synonym; = heterotypic synonym

== Range ==
Spiked ipomopsis is native to nine western US states. Its range extends to a few western counties of South Dakota, Nebraska, and Kansas. It likewise is found in just three counties in northern New Mexico, but grows in many parts of eastern Colorado and one county west of the Great Divide. The species is only known in a few counties of Utah, but in widely separated areas. It is widespread in Wyoming, but only grows in western and southern Montana, crossing over the mountains to also grow in Butte County, Idaho.
