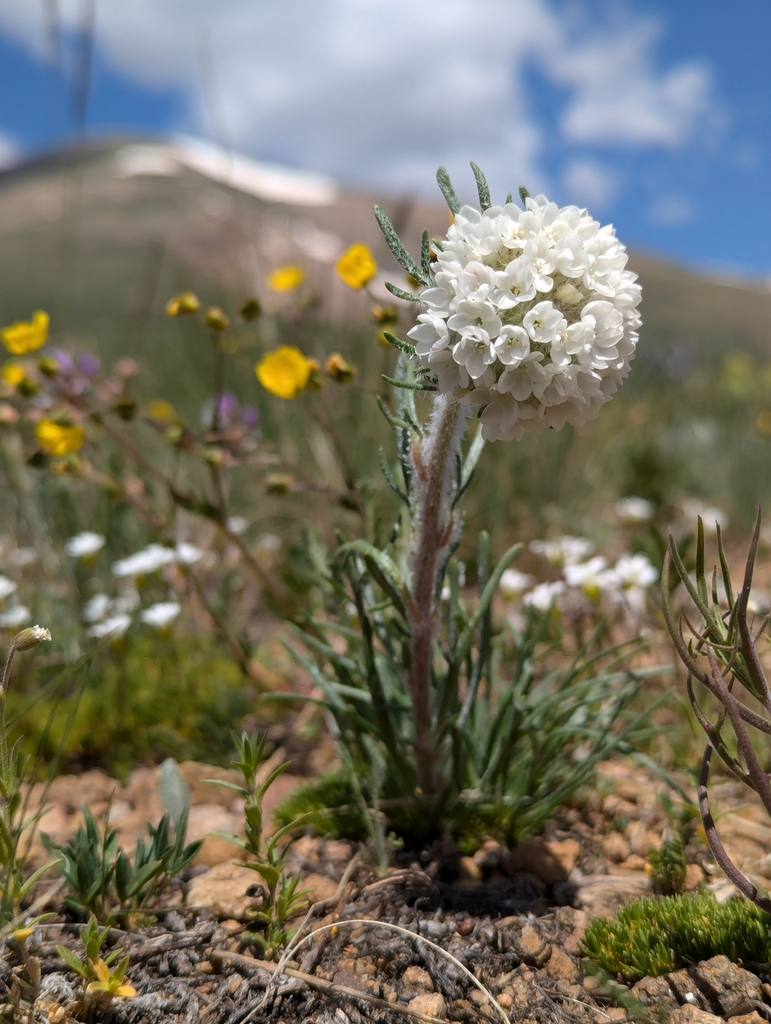
- Southeast of Mount Lincoln above the tree line, Pike National Forest

Conservation status
- Imperiled (NatureServe)

Scientific classification
- Kingdom: Plantae
- Clade: Embryophytes
- Clade: Tracheophytes
- Clade: Spermatophytes
- Clade: Angiosperms
- Clade: Eudicots
- Clade: Asterids
- Order: Ericales
- Family: Polemoniaceae
- Genus: Ipomopsis
- Species: I. globularis

Binomial name
- Ipomopsis globularis (Brand) W.A.Weber

Synonyms
- Gilia globularis Brand

= Ipomopsis globularis =

Plant species in the phlox family

Ipomopsis globularis, commonly the Hoosier Pass ipomopsis, is a species of flowering plant in the phlox family. It is endemic to Colorado in the United States, where it grows in the Rocky Mountains.

This plant is a perennial herb. The leaves are mostly located around the base of the plant. A spherical inflorescence of pinkish or bluish white flowers over one centimeter in diameter is borne atop a woolly stem up to about 6 inches in height. The flowers are fragrant.

This plant is found only in and around the Mosquito Range of the Rocky Mountains, for example, in the Hoosier Pass. Its habitat is in the alpine climate of mountain ridges up to 4270 meters in elevation. It grows in calcareous soils. The plants grow in meadows and on talus slopes. The land is flat to sloping.

The worst threat to this species is probably motorized recreation in the habitat, such as off-road vehicles and snowmobiles. This activity has increased recently as the nearby population has increased. Mining may be a minor current threat, but mining activity has decreased in the area. Introduced species of plants pose a potential threat.

== Taxonomy ==
Ipomopsis globularis was first scientifically described by August Brand 1907 as a species in the Gilia genus named Gilia globularis. It was moved to the genus Ipomopsis by William Alfred Weber in 1966. Together with its genus it is classified in the Polemoniaceae family and has no subspecies.

== Names ==
Ipomopsis globularis is known by the common names Hoosier Pass ipomopsis, alpine ball-head gilia and globe gilia, however Gilia capitata is also known as globe gilia.
