= Ipomopsis sancti-spiritus =

Conservation status
- Critically Imperiled (NatureServe)

Scientific classification
- Kingdom: Plantae
- Clade: Tracheophytes
- Clade: Angiosperms
- Clade: Eudicots
- Clade: Asterids
- Order: Ericales
- Family: Polemoniaceae
- Genus: Ipomopsis
- Species: I. sancti-spiritus

Binomial name
- Ipomopsis sancti-spiritus Wilken & Fletcher

Species of flowering plant

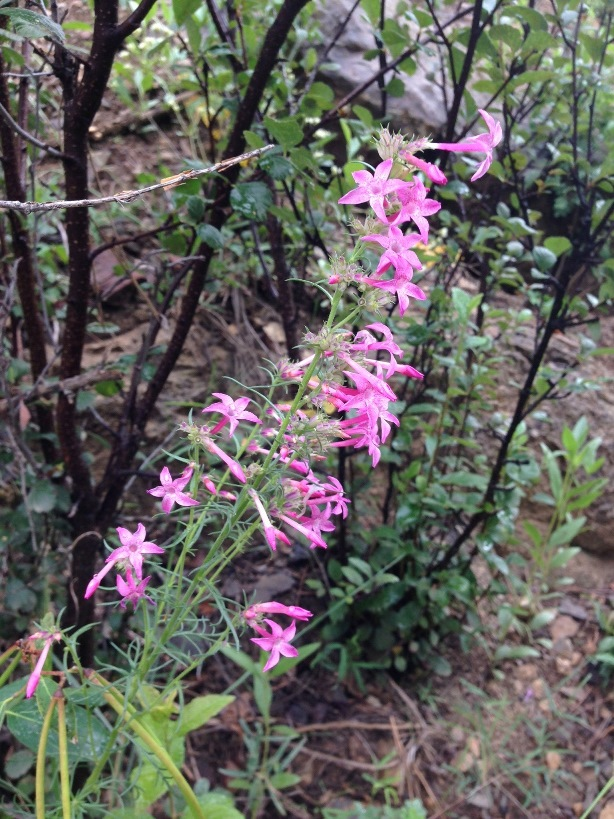
The Holy Ghost ipomopsis grows only on the north side cutslopes along Forest Road 122 on the Santa Fe National Forest

Ipomopsis sancti-spiritus is a rare species of flowering plant in the phlox family known by the common name Holy Ghost ipomopsis. It is endemic to New Mexico in the United States, where it is known from only one canyon in the Sangre de Cristo Mountains. It is a federally listed endangered species.

This plant was first described in 1988, when specimens were found to differ slightly from the description of the very similar Ipomopsis aggregata. The species is known only from a two-mile (3-km) stretch of Holy Ghost Canyon in San Miguel County, northern New Mexico. Though estimates of the population are difficult to make because of the plant's similarity to I. aggregata, some estimates have ranged from 372 to 2047 individuals. Research suggests the plant is at high risk for extinction.

Holy Ghost ipomopsis is a perennial herb growing 30 to 80 centimeters (12 to 31 in) tall. The leaves are mostly located around the base of the plant and wither as the plant flowers. Leaves on the stem become smaller toward the top. The inflorescence is a number of clusters of flowers, one at the tip of the stem and a few along the sides of the upper stem. The flower is bright pink with a thin tubular throat up to 2 centimeters (0.79 in) long opening into five pointed lobes each nearly 1 centimeter (0.39 in) in length. Blooming occurs in July through September.

The plant most often grows on steep, west-facing limestone slopes next to a road in one canyon in the Santa Fe National Forest. Other plants in the area include ponderosa pine (Pinus ponderosa), Douglas-fir (Pseudotsuga menziesii), quaking aspen (Populus tremuloides), Gambel oak (Quercus gambelii), mountain mahogany (Cercocarpus montanus), Woods' rose (Rosa woodsii), poison ivy (Toxicodendron rydbergii), Indian hemp]] (Apocynum cannabinum), western yarrow (Achillea millefolium), and white ragweed (Hymenopappus newberryi).

The plant grows on bare soils, and probably requires periodic disturbance to keep its habitat clear of competing vegetation. It does not tolerate shade or an accumulation of leaf litter. This buildup of tinder increase the likelihood of a large wildfire, which could conceivably destroy the whole population; conservation efforts include clearing overgrown brush and flammable material.

This species has low fecundity, rarely reproducing successfully, with fewer than 10% of flowers producing fruits and the fruits containing few viable seeds. With relatively few individuals in the breeding pool it likely suffers from inbreeding depression. Forecasts indicate that the plant is likely to reach extinction within 50 years.
