= White Pocket =

Rock formation in Arizona, USA

Coordinates: 37.4579°N 111.7041°W

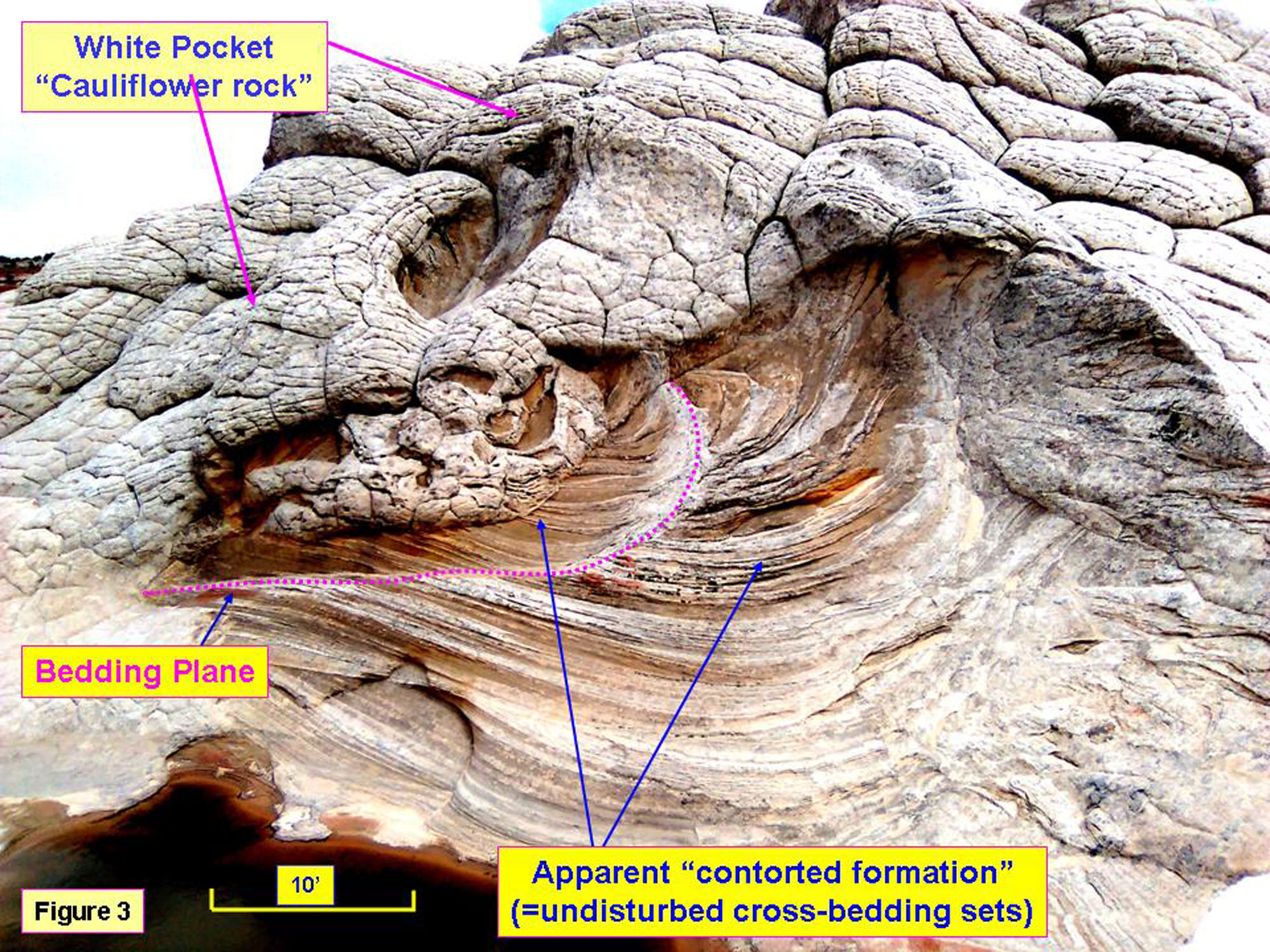
Cauliflower rock

White Pocket is located geographically in Vermilion Cliffs National Monument, Arizona and geologically on the Colorado Plateau. The Navajo Sandstone is exposed on the plateau as mounds and ridges. These are mostly reddish erosional remnants, but those remnants in White Pocket are blanketed with a white layer appearing as "Cauliflower Rock" (see figure). This white layer makes this area unique and thus being called the White Pocket.

== Genesis ==
On the surface exposure, the "Cauliflower Rock", which appears to be intertwined with the underlying formation (see figure), has been interpreted as contorted formation and thus prompted two schools of thought for the extraordinary geological processes at White Pocket. Some geologists proclaim that White Pocket results from soft-sediment deformation, and others suggest that large-scaled slumping and landslides generated by earthquakes were responsible. Both have attributed to structural deformation involved in the formation of the apparent "contorted formation".

Small scale soft-sediment deformation in outcrops is quite common and has been reported locally in the Glen Canyon region, and in Zion National Park. Regional soft-sediment deformation, such as those interpreted in White Pocket, is rare and requires geological mechanisms to induce such deformation. Marc Deshowitz (2011) interpreted that earthquake created a sand mass, which is the present day featureless bleached-white sandstone or "Cauliflower Rock" on the surface. He attributed the apparent "contorted" features to fluid escape structures as sand volcano.

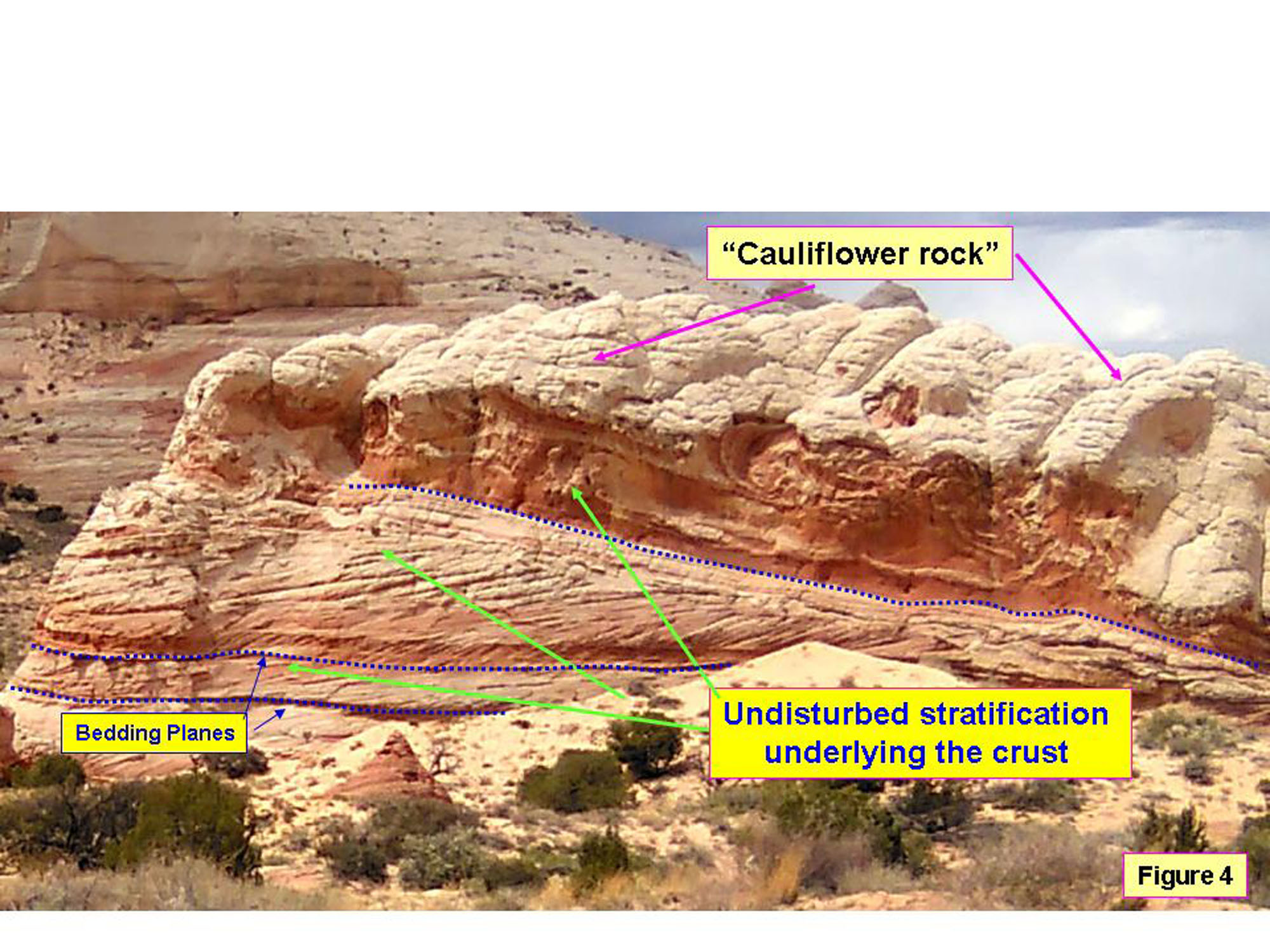
stratification beneath Cauliflower rock

Compelling evidence provided in a recent preprint report by Chen (2024) has, however, indicated that the "Cauliflower Rock" is a depositional feature, representing an excessive thick weathering crust, which is formed in arid region by deposition of minerals, derived from uprising groundwater. The rock is cored or underlain by undisturbed stratification (see figures), demonstrating little structural disturbance in the formation of the white mass. The appearance of "contorted formation" in the rock is, in fact, generated by exposure of undisturbed cross-bedding sets on landscape surfaces with different curvatures and orientations. Varying degrees of the weathering crust development have been also noted, a clear evidence of depositional process (see figures).

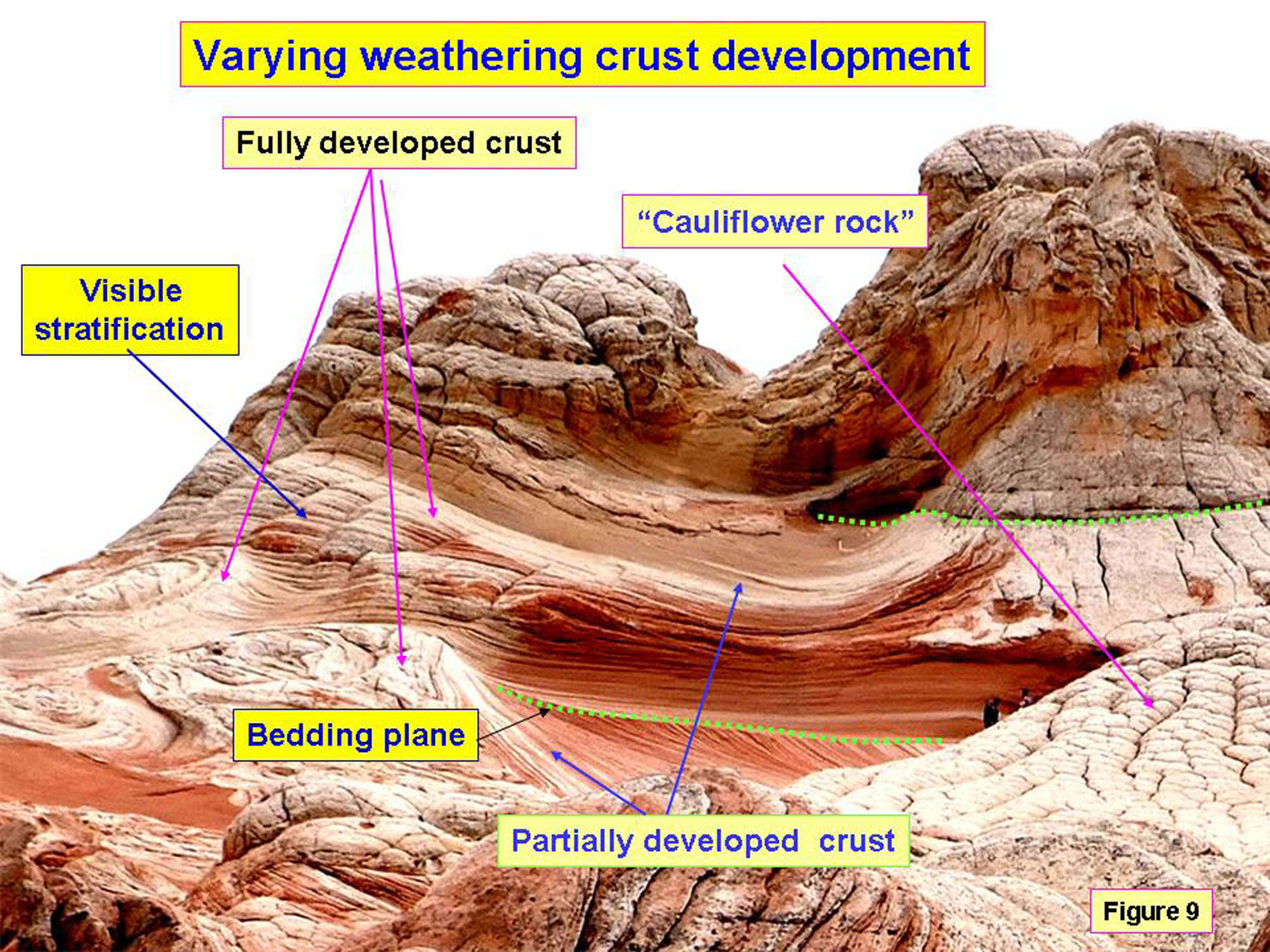
Varying crust development in White Pocket
