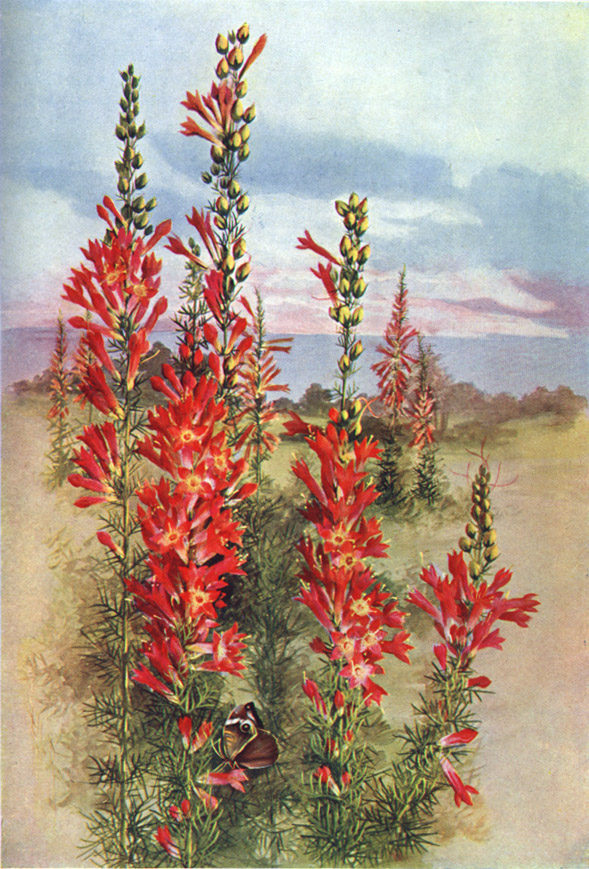
- Standing Cypress (I. rubra)

Conservation status
- Apparently Secure (NatureServe)

Scientific classification
- Kingdom: Plantae
- Clade: Embryophytes
- Clade: Tracheophytes
- Clade: Spermatophytes
- Clade: Angiosperms
- Clade: Eudicots
- Clade: Asterids
- Order: Ericales
- Family: Polemoniaceae
- Genus: Ipomopsis
- Species: I. rubra

Binomial name
- Ipomopsis rubra (Pursh) V.E.Grant

= Ipomopsis rubra =

Species of flowering plant

Ipomopsis rubra is a flowering plant of the phlox family native to North America in the state of Texas and the southeastern United States, commonly known as standing cypress, scarlet gilia, Texas plume, flame flower, and indian spur. This classification is synonymous with Gilia rubra. This flower is noteworthy for its bright, upturned flowers.

== Identification ==
Ipomosis rubra has very short, filament leaves attached to long stems, upwards of five feet long in some cases. Ipomosis rubra flowers are about an inch long with a number of small stamen inside. The tubular flowers grow in spears and all point upwards. The flowers have small yellow dots inside, and have five lobed petals. Ipomosis rubra also has a very long taproot to survive droughts.

== Uses ==
This flower has found use in gardens as a hummingbird attractant for its hardy qualities and self-seeding nature. Ipomopsis rubra is also attractive for low water requirements.
