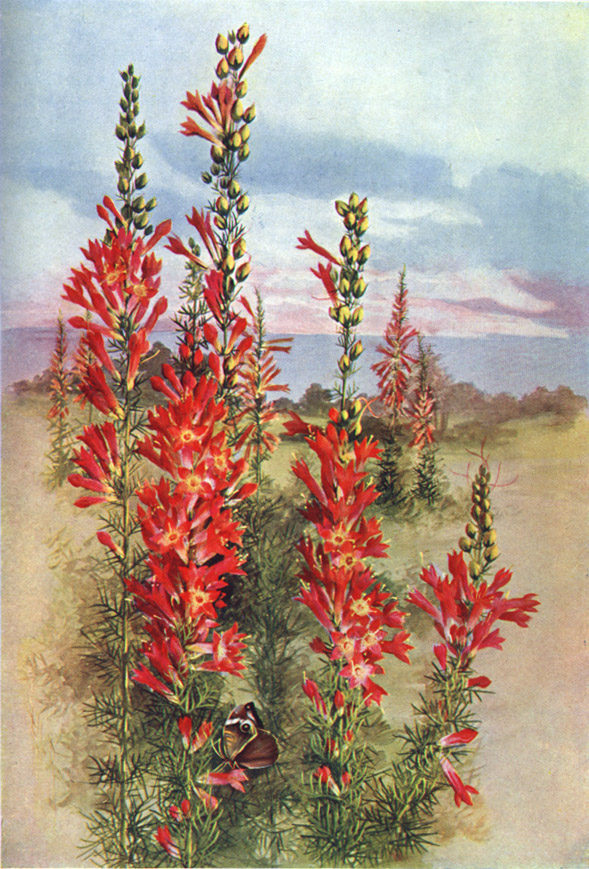
- Standing cypress (Ipomopsis rubra)

Scientific classification
- Kingdom: Plantae
- Clade: Embryophytes
- Clade: Tracheophytes
- Clade: Spermatophytes
- Clade: Angiosperms
- Clade: Eudicots
- Clade: Asterids
- Order: Ericales
- Family: Polemoniaceae
- Genus: Ipomopsis; Michx. (1803)

Species
- 29; see text

Synonyms
- Batanthes Raf. (1832); Callisteris Greene (1905); Ipomeria Nutt. (1818)

= Ipomopsis =

Genus of flowering plants

Ipomopsis is a genus of flowering plants in the phlox family, Polemoniaceae. The annual and perennial herbs it contains are native to the Americas, particularly North America.

== Species ==
29 species are accepted. They include:

- Ipomopsis aggregata (Pursh) V.E.Grant - Scarlet gilia
- Ipomopsis arizonica (Greene) Wherry - Arizona firecracker (Mojave Desert)
- Ipomopsis congesta (Hook.) V.E.Grant - Ballhead ipomopsis (Western North America)
- Ipomopsis effusa (A.Gray) Moran - Baja California ipomopsis
- Ipomopsis globularis (Brand) W.A.Weber - Hoosier Pass ipomopsis
- Ipomopsis gunnisonii (Torr. & A.Gray) V.E.Grant - Sand Dune ipomopsis
- Ipomopsis guttata (A.Gray) Moran
- Ipomopsis laxiflora (J.M.Coult.) V.E.Grant - Iron ipomopsis
- Ipomopsis longiflora (Torr.) V.E.Grant - Flaxflowered ipomopsis
- Ipomopsis macombii (Torr. ex A.Gray) V.E.Grant - Macomb's ipomopsis
- Ipomopsis macrosiphon (Kearney & Peebles) V.E.Grant & Wilken - Longtube ipomopsis
- Ipomopsis monticola J.M.Porter & L.A.Johnson
- Ipomopsis multiflora (Nutt.) V.E.Grant - Manyflower ipomopsis
- Ipomopsis pinnata (Cav.) V.E.Grant - San Luis Mountains ipomopsis
- Ipomopsis polyantha (Rydb.) V.E.Grant - Pagosa ipomopsis
- Ipomopsis polycladon (Torr.) V.E.Grant - Manybranched ipomopsis (Western United States, Northern Mexico)
- Ipomopsis pringlei (A.Gray) Henrickson
- Ipomopsis pumila Ipomopsis pringlei (A.Gray) Henrickson - Dwarf ipomopsis
- Ipomopsis ramosa Al Schneid. & Bregar
- Ipomopsis roseata (Rydb.) V.E.Grant - Rosy ipomopsis
- Ipomopsis rubra (L.) Wherry - Standing cypress
- Ipomopsis sancti-spiritus Wilken & R.A.Fletcher - Holy Ghost ipomopsis
- Ipomopsis spicata (Nutt.) V.E.Grant - Spiked ipomopsis
- Ipomopsis tenuifolia (A.Gray) V.E.Grant - Slenderleaf skyrocket (Baja California, Southern Arizona, Southern California)
- Ipomopsis tenuituba (Rydb.) V.E.Grant - Slendertube skyrocket (Western United States)
- Ipomopsis thuberi (A.Gray) V.E.Grant - El Paso skyrocket
- Ipomopsis wendtii Henrickson
- Ipomopsis wrightii (A.Gray) Shinners - Leafy skyrocket

=== Formerly placed here ===
- Dayia havardii (A.Gray) J.M.Porter - Havard's ipomopsis (as Ipomopsis havardii (A.Gray) V.E.Grant)
- Microgilia minutiflora (Benth.) J.M.Porter & L.A.Johnson - Littleflower ipomopsis (as Ipomopsis minutiflora (Benth.) V.E.Grant)
