= Ipomopsis ramosa =

Scientific classification
- Kingdom: Plantae
- Clade: Tracheophytes
- Clade: Angiosperms
- Clade: Eudicots
- Clade: Asterids
- Order: Ericales
- Family: Polemoniaceae
- Genus: Ipomopsis
- Species: I. ramosa

Binomial name
- Ipomopsis ramosa Al Schneid. & Bregar

Plant species in the phlox family

Ipomopsis ramosa, coral ipomopsis, is a rare plant in the phlox family from southwestern Colorado.

== Description ==
Coral ipomopsis is a biennial to perennial herbaceous plant that usually grows multiple flowering stems 25 to 44 centimeters (10–17.5 in) tall. It grows a substantial taproot as much as 24 cm (9.5 in) long topped by a caudex, that can be branched and 3 cm (1 in) thick. The often red stems are slightly hairy and glandular toward the base and increasingly so towards their ends. They are stiff, 3–4 millimeters thick, and each one branched four to nine times, though occasionally as many as 13 times.

In the first year of growth Coral ipomopsis has a rosette of basal leaves 5 to 9 centimeters (2–3.5 in) in diameter. The leaves are covered in sparsely in long soft hairs, especially along the central vein of the feathery leaves, though the basal leaves are mostly faded by the time of flowering. The leave attached to the stems are 3–5 cm (1–2 in) long low on the stem and gradually become smaller higher up. They are pinnatisect, deeply divided, with the side lobes narrow and grass-like, as much a 2.5 cm long. Both sides of the leaves are sparsely glandular and produce a scent that is pleasant and spicy.

Blooming starts in late May with the peak usually in mid-July and concludes in mid-August. The flowers are trumpet shaped and somewhat translucent with coral-streaks on a white background or solidly coral colored, though colorless at the base inside the sepals. The flower opens to five pointed lobes 8 mm long and coral-pink dotted. Each is 1.4–1.7 cm long from the split of the lobes to the base of the floral tube.

== Taxonomy ==
Ipomopsis ramosa was scientifically described and named by Al Schneider and John Bregar in 2011. It is part of the Ipomopsis genus which is classified in the Polemoniaceae family and has no botanical synonyms. The species was first recorded by Al and Betty Schneider in 2006 when they together collected the type specimen on 29 June 45 kilometers (28 mi) northeast of Dolores, Colorado. They were, at first, uncertain about the identity of the plants they had found. Al Schneider began a more in depth study of the species in 2011, dissecting specimens and measuring parts, then contacting Guy L. Nesom for his opinion on if they could represent a new species.

=== Names ===
Schneider and Bregar named the species, ramosa, meaning "many-branched" in Botanical Latin as a reference to the highly branched character of the plants. It is known by the common name coral ipomopsis, also coined by Schneider and Bregar in their paper describing the species.

== Range and habitat ==
Coral ipomopsis is endemic to just Montezuma County, Colorado, the most southwestern county in the state. There the main two populations are found in Roaring Forks Canyon and Wildcat Canyon, smaller side canyons of the Dolores River above the town of Dolores. The size of its range is less than 100 square kilometers (39 sq mi).

The species grows in sparsely vegetated areas that face southwest to southeast on red sandstones, siltstones, and shales of the Cutler Formation laid down during the Permian.
