= Vermilion Cliffs National Monument =

Protected area in Coconino County, Arizona

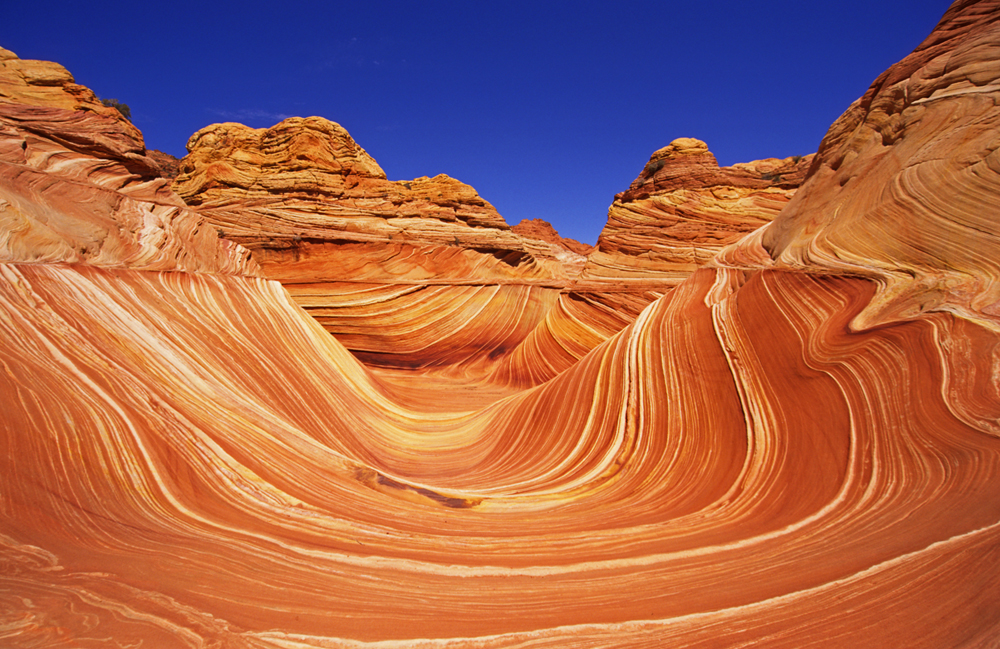
- The Wave in the Coyote Buttes
- Interactive map of Vermilion Cliffs National Monument
- Location: Coconino County, Arizona, United States
- Nearest city: Page, Arizona
- Coordinates: 36°48′23″N 111°44′28″W
- Area: 293,689 acres (118,852 ha)
- Established: November 9, 2000
- Governing body: U.S. Bureau of Land Management
- Website: https://www.blm.gov/national-conservation-lands/arizona/vermilion-cliffs/

U.S. National Monument

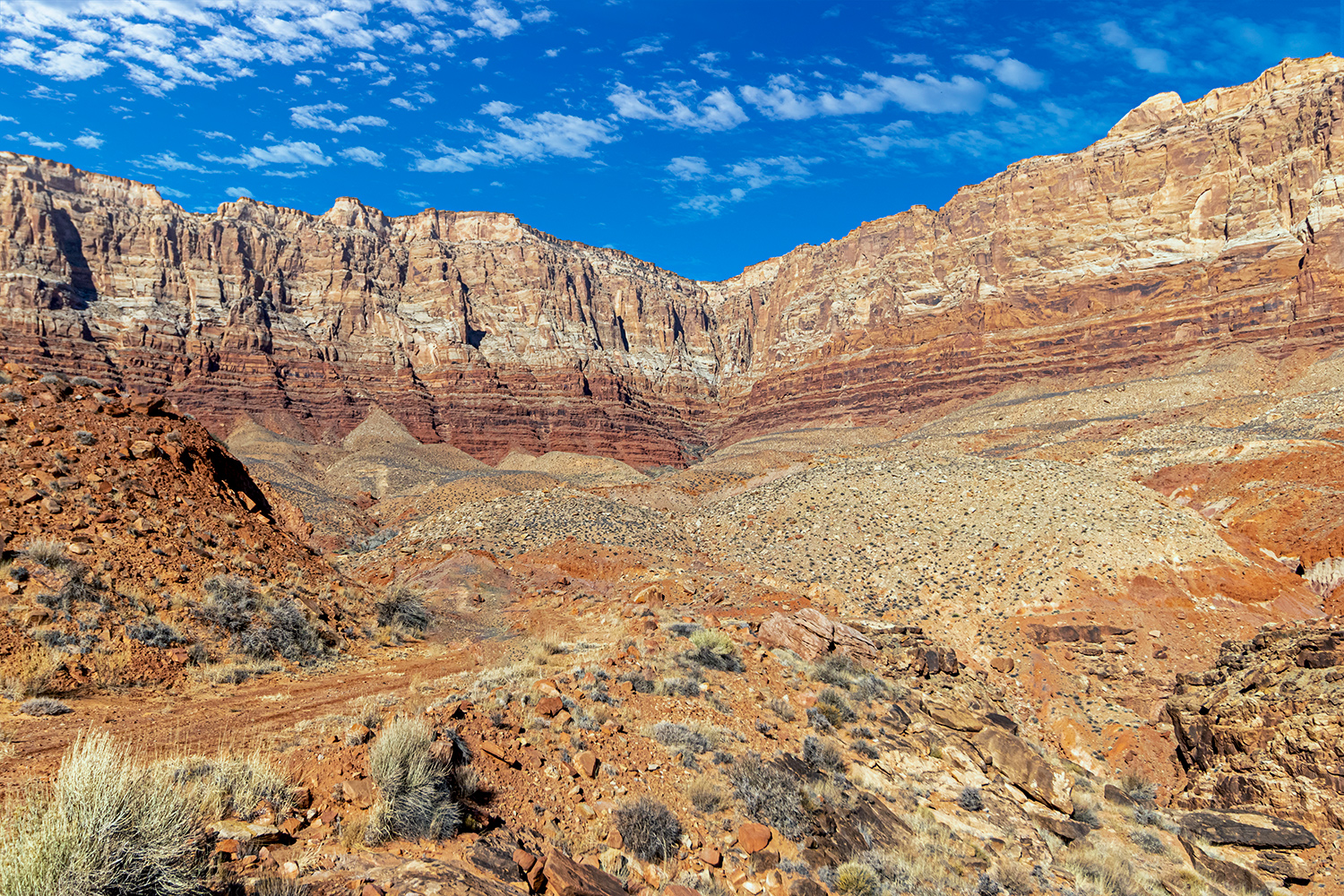
View Of the upper reaches of the Vermilion Cliffs.

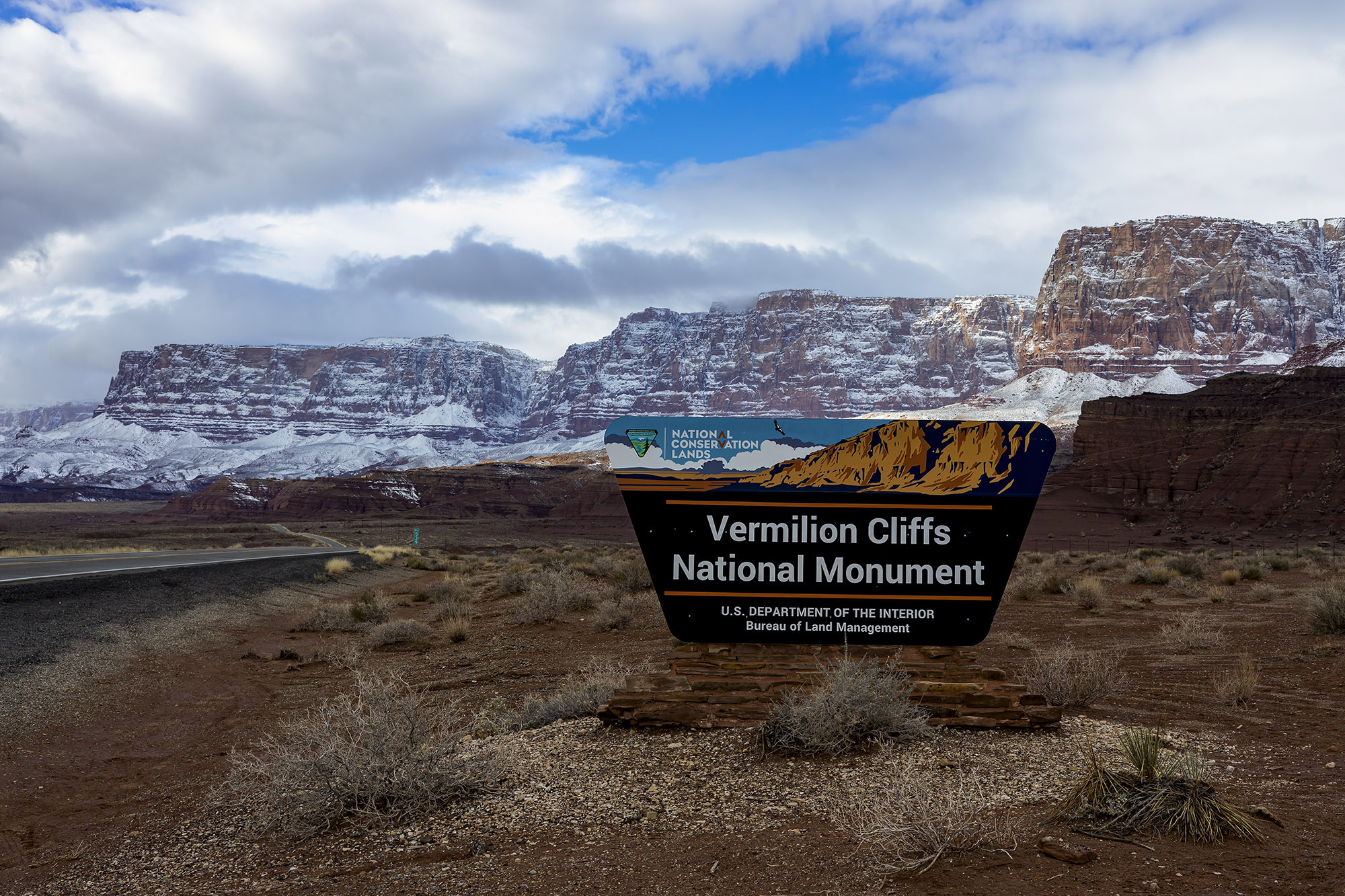
A Vermilion Cliffs National Monument Sign in Marble Canyon, AZ.

Vermilion Cliffs National Monument is located in northern Coconino County, Arizona, United States, immediately south of the Utah state line. This national monument, 293,689 acres (118,852 ha) in area, protects the Paria Plateau, Vermilion Cliffs, Coyote Buttes, and Paria Canyon. Elevations in the monument range from 3,100 feet to 6,500 feet above sea level (944 to 1,981 meters).

== Creation and designation ==
Established on November 9, 2000 by a presidential proclamation by President Bill Clinton, Vermilion Cliffs National Monument was carved from existing lands already under the management of the U.S. Government in extreme northern Coconino County, Arizona, immediately south of the border with the state of Utah. The monument is administered by the U.S. Bureau of Land Management, an agency within the U.S. Department of the Interior. The Vermilion Cliffs themselves run along the southern and eastern edges of the monument. Much of the monument's land consists of the Paria Plateau, a flat area extending northward from the tops of the cliffs.

== Vermilion Cliffs ==
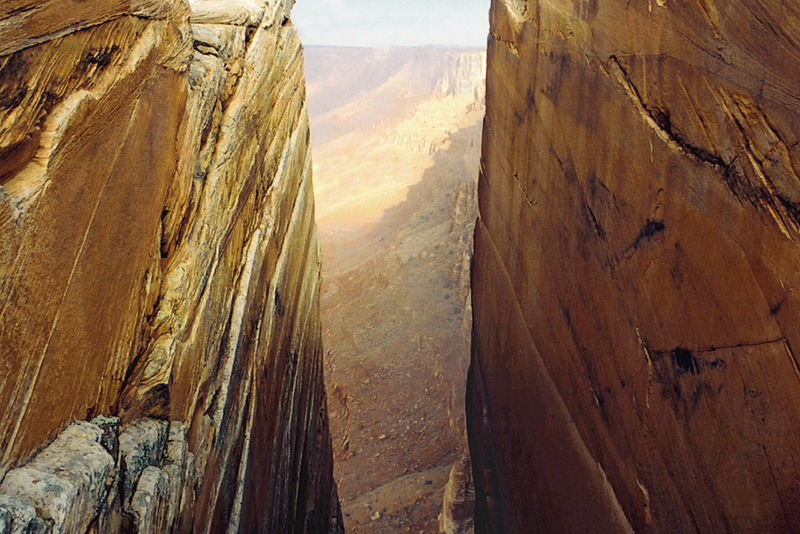
Sunrise through a cleft in the Vermilion Cliffs

The Vermilion Cliffs are steep eroded escarpments consisting primarily of sandstone, siltstone, limestone, and shale which rise as much as 3,000 feet (910 m) above their bases. These sedimentary rocks have been deeply eroded for millions of years, exposing hundreds of layers of richly colored rock strata. Mesas, buttes, and large tablelands are interspersed with steep canyons, where some small streams provide enough moisture to support a sampling of wildlife.

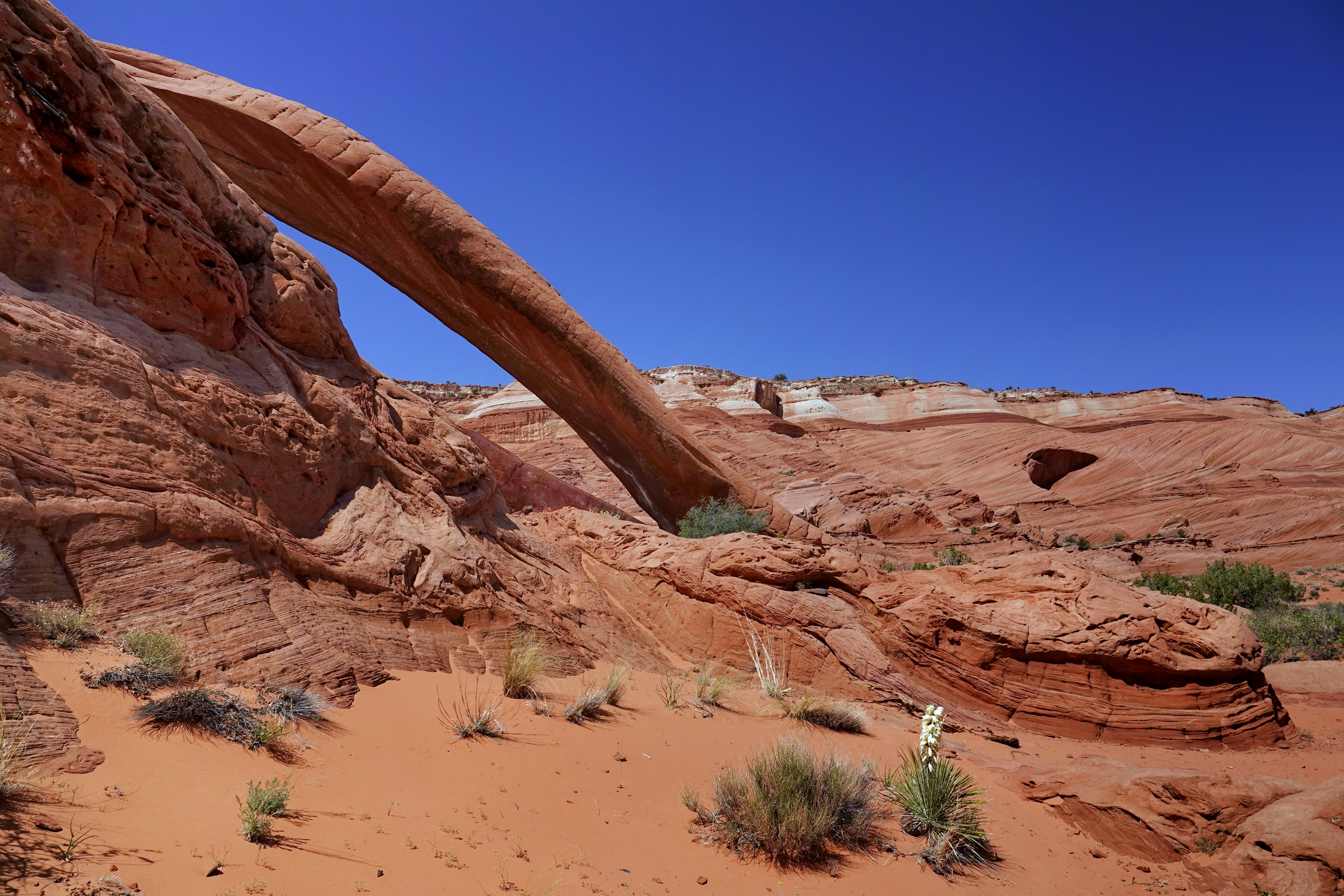
Cobra Arch north of Buckskin Gulch, Vermilion Cliffs National Monument

== Flora and fauna ==
More than twenty species of raptors, including bald eagles and golden eagles, peregrine falcons, and several hawk species, have been observed. The endangered California condor was re-introduced into this region in 1996 due to its remote location and lack of human habitation. Desert bighorn sheep, pronghorns, and mountain lions make up most of the large mammals found here, with about 30 more species of smaller mammals. Several examples of rare fish species, such as the flannelmouth sucker and the speckled dace live in the streams of the monument. The Welsh's milkweed Asclepias welshii, a threatened plant species that grows on sand dunes and helps stabilize them, is known to exist only in the monument and one other area in neighboring Utah.

== Human settlements ==
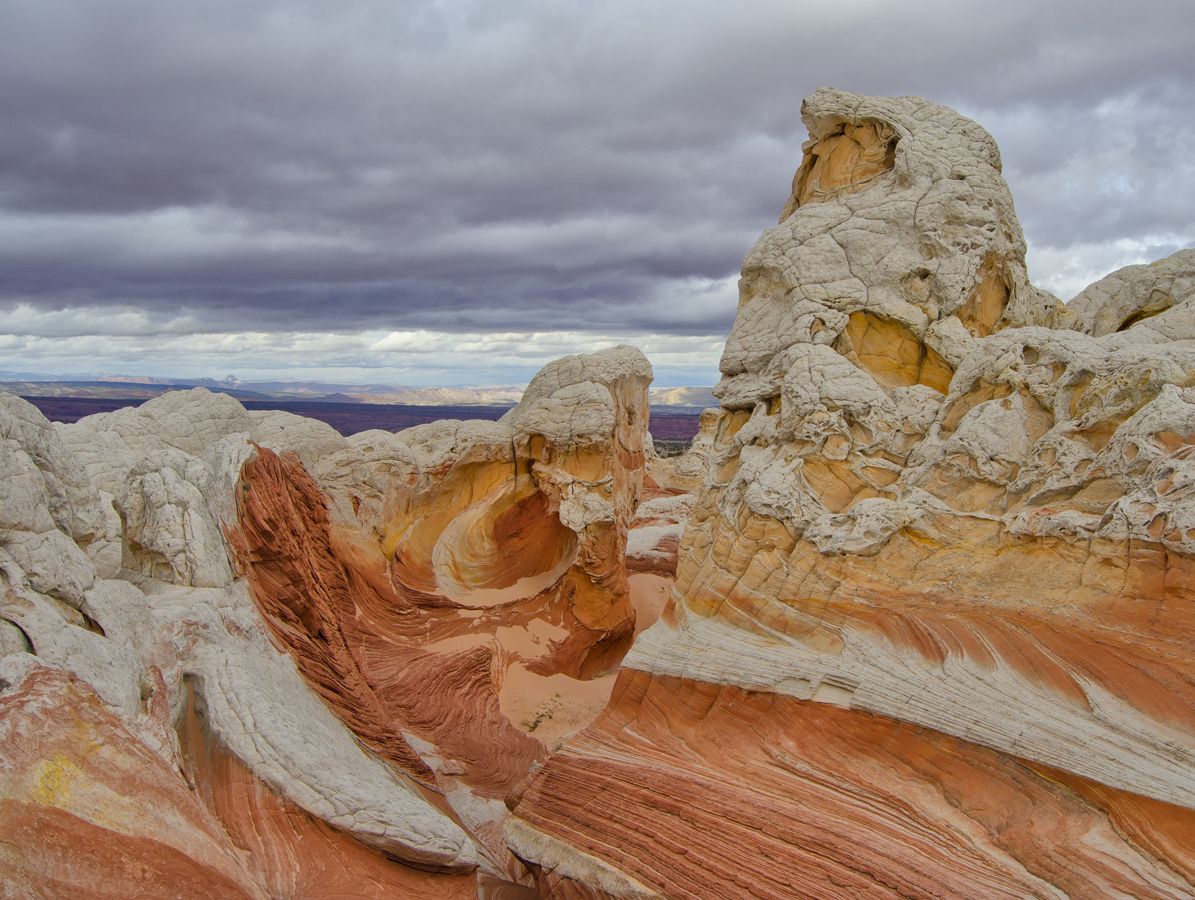
White Pocket area formation

Human settlement in the region dates back 12,000 years; hundreds of Native American pueblos are spread across the monument. The remains of the natives' villages, with houses, granaries, burial areas, and associated ruins, can be found here. The monument also contains one of the largest collections of rock art sites in any nationally protected area. Many of these petroglyphs are believed to be among the oldest in the United States.

The first Europeans to visit the region were Spanish missionaries and explorers from the 1776 Domínguez–Escalante expedition. Later, Mormon explorers searched the region during the 1860s, some of them settling on land that is now within the monument. They built one of the first ferry crossings on the Colorado River in 1871. That same year, John Wesley Powell ventured through this region during his scientific explorations of the Colorado River plateau.

Below the Vermilion cliffs runs the historic "Honeymoon Trail", a wagon route for Mormons who journeyed to and from the temple at St. George, Utah to have their marriages sealed. The route, through remote country, was otherwise seldom used. Historical markers denote its history.

Today, the region surrounding the monument is relatively unspoiled with few roads and virtually no permanent inhabitants.

== See also ==
- List of national monuments of the United States
