= Verne Grant =

American botanist and writer (1917–2007)

Verne Edwin Grant
- Born: Verne Edwin Grant; October 17, 1917; San Francisco, California
- Died: May 29, 2007 (aged 89)
- Occupations: Botanist, writer
- Spouse(s): Alva Day (1919-2014), Karen Alt (1935-2018)
- Children: Brian Grant (b. 1947), Brenda Grant (b. 1953)
- Parent(s): Edwin Grant, Bessie Swallow

Verne Edwin Grant (October 17, 1917 – May 29, 2007) was an American botanist and writer.

Grant was born to Edwin and Bessie Grant on October 17, 1917, in San Francisco, California. He married Alva Georgia Day in 1942. They had two children, Brian Grant and Brenda Grant. Following a divorce in 1959, he married Karen Susan Alt and they stayed married for the rest of his life.

In 1940 he received his BA in Botany and in 1949 his PhD in Botany and Genetics from the University of California, Berkeley. He was the Professor of Botany for the University of Texas at Austin from 1970 to 1987.

His book The Origin of Adaptations (1963) discussed the main themes of the modern synthesis such as genetic drift, modes of speciation, natural selection and population genetics. However, Grant did not describe these mechanisms of evolution as "Neo-Darwinism" or the synthetic theory, instead he referred to these mechanisms as the "causal theory." The book was awarded the 1964 Phi Beta Kappa Award in Science.

Systematic botanist Áskell Löve in a review for the book wrote that "Grant has succeeded in writing a text that is likely to affect the thinking in this field for decades to come and also to be regarded by students as one of the most informative texts on the subject ever written."

Grant died of Parkinson's disease on May 29, 2007, at the age of 89.

== Publications ==
The standard author abbreviation V.E.Grant is used to indicate this person as the author when citing a botanical name.

- The Origins of Adaptations (1963)
- The Architecture of the Germplasm (1964)
- Plant Speciation (1971)
- Genetics of Flowering Plants (1975)
- Organismic Evolution (1977)
- The Evolutionary Process: A Critical Review of Evolutionary Theory (1985; 2nd Ed 1991)
