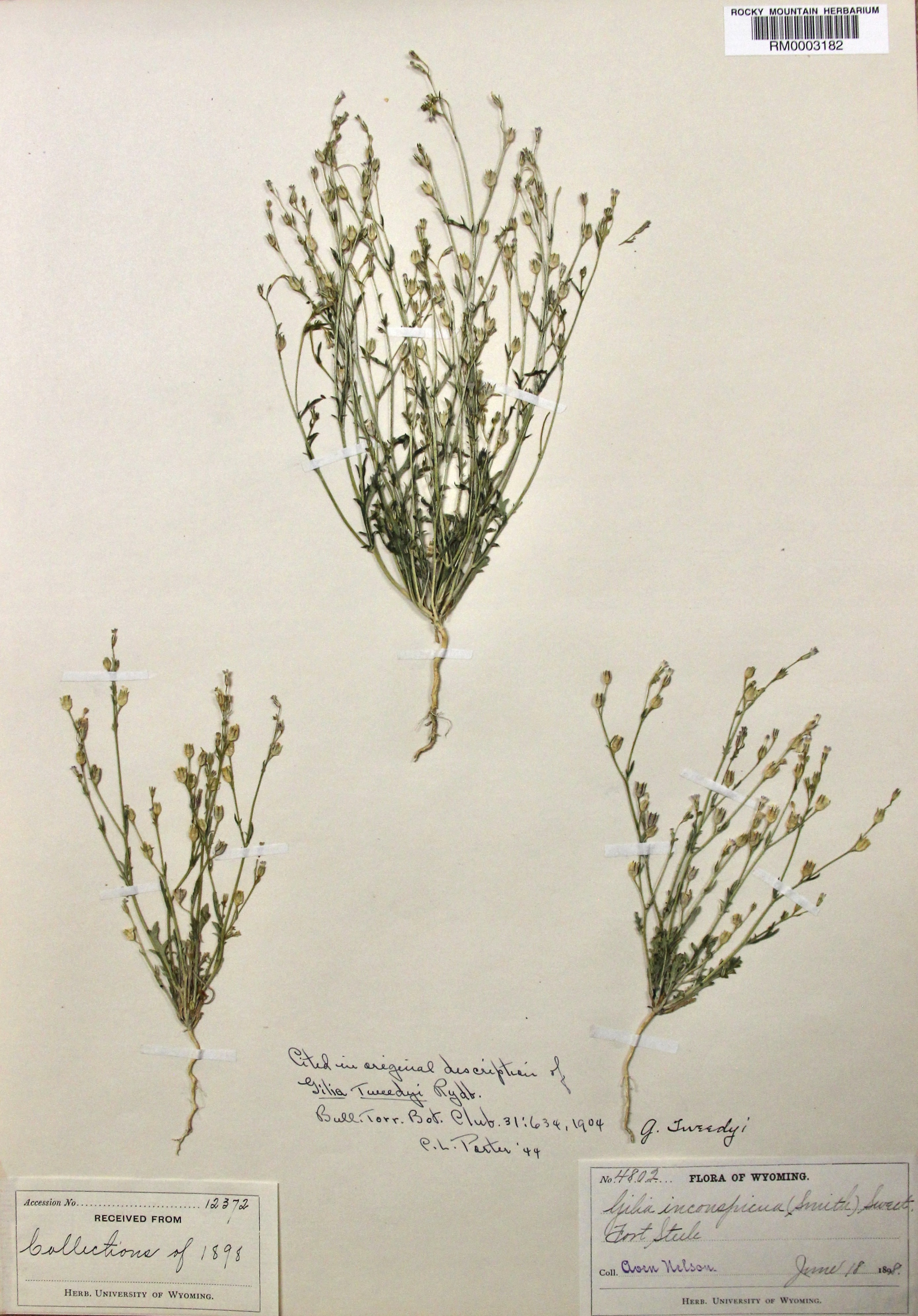
- Gilia tweedyi collected in 1898, Fort Steele, Wyoming, USA

Conservation status
- Apparently Secure (NatureServe)

Scientific classification
- Kingdom: Plantae
- Clade: Embryophytes
- Clade: Tracheophytes
- Clade: Spermatophytes
- Clade: Angiosperms
- Clade: Eudicots
- Clade: Asterids
- Order: Ericales
- Family: Polemoniaceae
- Genus: Gilia
- Species: G. tweedyi

Binomial name
- Gilia tweedyi Rydb.

Synonyms
- Gilia inconspicua var. tweedyi; Gilia sinuata var. tweedyi

= Gilia tweedyi =

Annual plant in the phlox family

Gilia tweedyi, or Tweedy's gilia, is an annual plant in the phlox family. It is native to the northwestern United States.

== Description ==
Gilia tweedyi is an annual 5–40 cm (2.0–15.7 in) tall, the stems usually branched. Height and branching are quite variable, probably dependent on habitat conditions. Stems and leaves have distinctive cottony or cobwebby hairs, and are glandular, more so in the upper part of the plant. Basal leaves are 2–5 cm (0.79–1.97 in) long, deeply lobed, the lobes mucronate (with sharp pointed tips); stem leaves are smaller, also mucronate. Flowers are in an open inflorescence (or flowers single to few in small individuals), the corollas (united petals) funnelform, blue with a yellow throat, the tube to 5 mm long with short lobes. Mature capsules are 4–5 mm (0.16–0.20 in) long.

== Taxonomy ==
Gilia tweedyi was described and published in 1904 by Per Axel Rydberg, who named it in honor of Frank Tweedy, one of the earliest collectors. Rydberg's type description is based on Tweedy's specimen #4422, deposited at the New York Botanical Garden's Steere Herbarium. It is classified in the genus Gilia as part of the wider Polemoniaceae family.

In his description, Rydberg noted the similarity of Gilia tweedyi to Gilia inconspicua and Gilia minutiflora. "From the former it differs in the smaller corolla, of which not only the corolla-tube but also the throat is included in the calyx; from the latter it differs in the pinnatifid leaves."

Although it has no accepted varieties, it has two homotypic synonyms where it was described as a variety of Gilia sinuata in 1959 and of Gilia inconspicua in 1984, both times by Arthur Cronquist.

In 1907, August Brand published the similarly named Gilia minutiflora var. tweedyi, however this is considered a synonym of Microgilia minutiflora by Plants of the World Online.

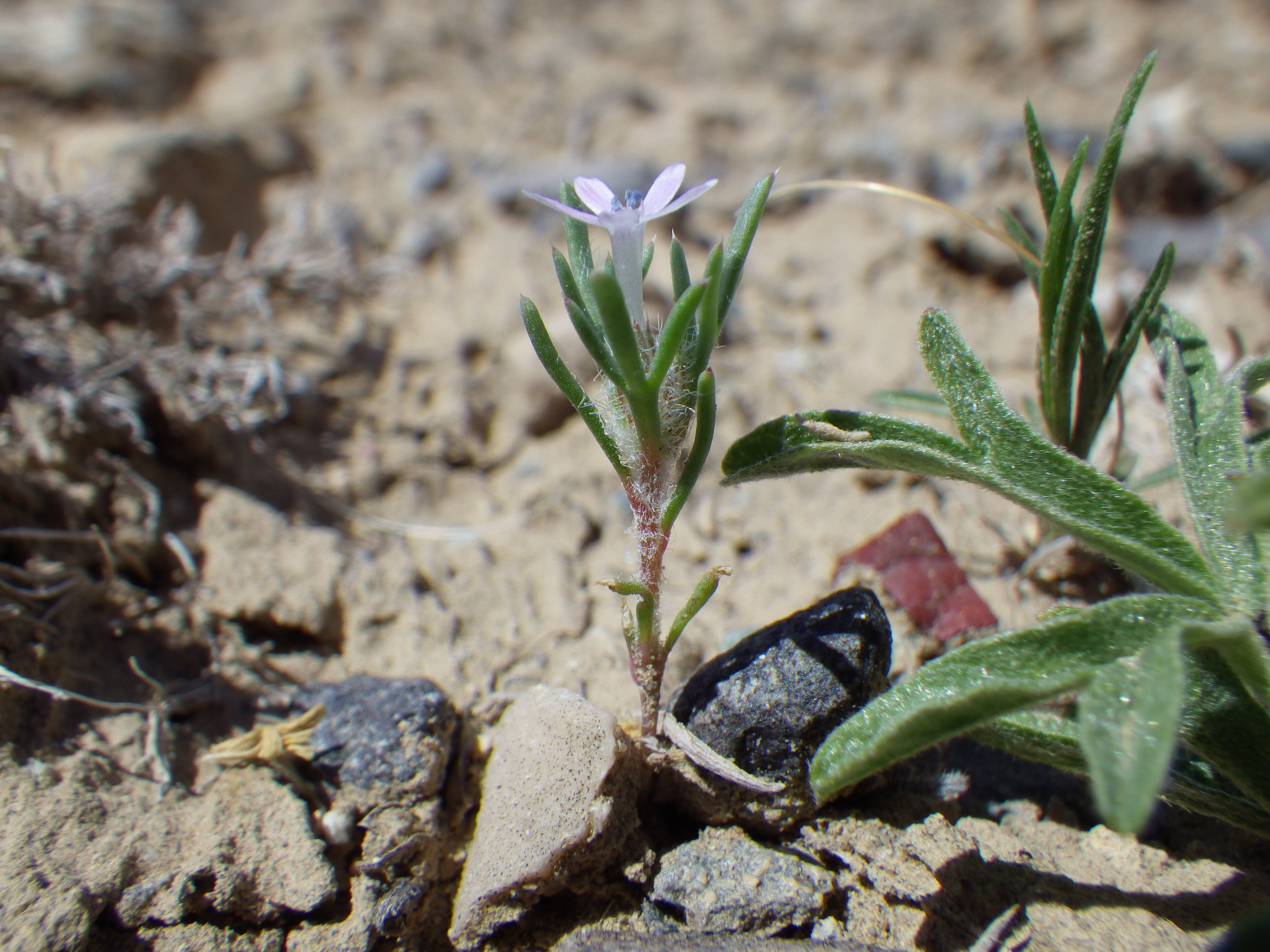
Gilia tweedyi from the Pryor Mountains area, Montana, USA

== Distribution ==
Gilia tweedyi is native to the northwestern US, from Oregon through central Idaho east to Montana, and south to northeast Nevada, Wyoming and northwest Colorado. It grows in juniper woodlands, sagebrush and other desert shrublands, dry grasslands and on dry sparsely vegetated sites, at 500 m (1,600 ft) to 2,500 m (8,200 ft) elevation.

== Conservation status ==
Tweedy's gilia is ranked G4, i.e., apparently secure globally. It is of state conservation concern in Montana and Wyoming.

== History ==
Gilia tweedyi was named by Per Axel Rydberg in honor of botanist Frank Tweedy, who made several of the earliest collections, one of which (#4422) was the basis for Rydberg's type description. At the time, Tweedy was working as a topographer for the US Geological Survey. The type specimen was collected in 1901, from a river bottom near Encampment, Wyoming, at 7200 ft elevation. Earlier collections made by Aven Nelson, Professor of Botany at the University of Wyoming, in 1898 in southern Wyoming, and by Tweedy in 1900 in the Bighorn Mountains, Wyoming, are paratypes.
