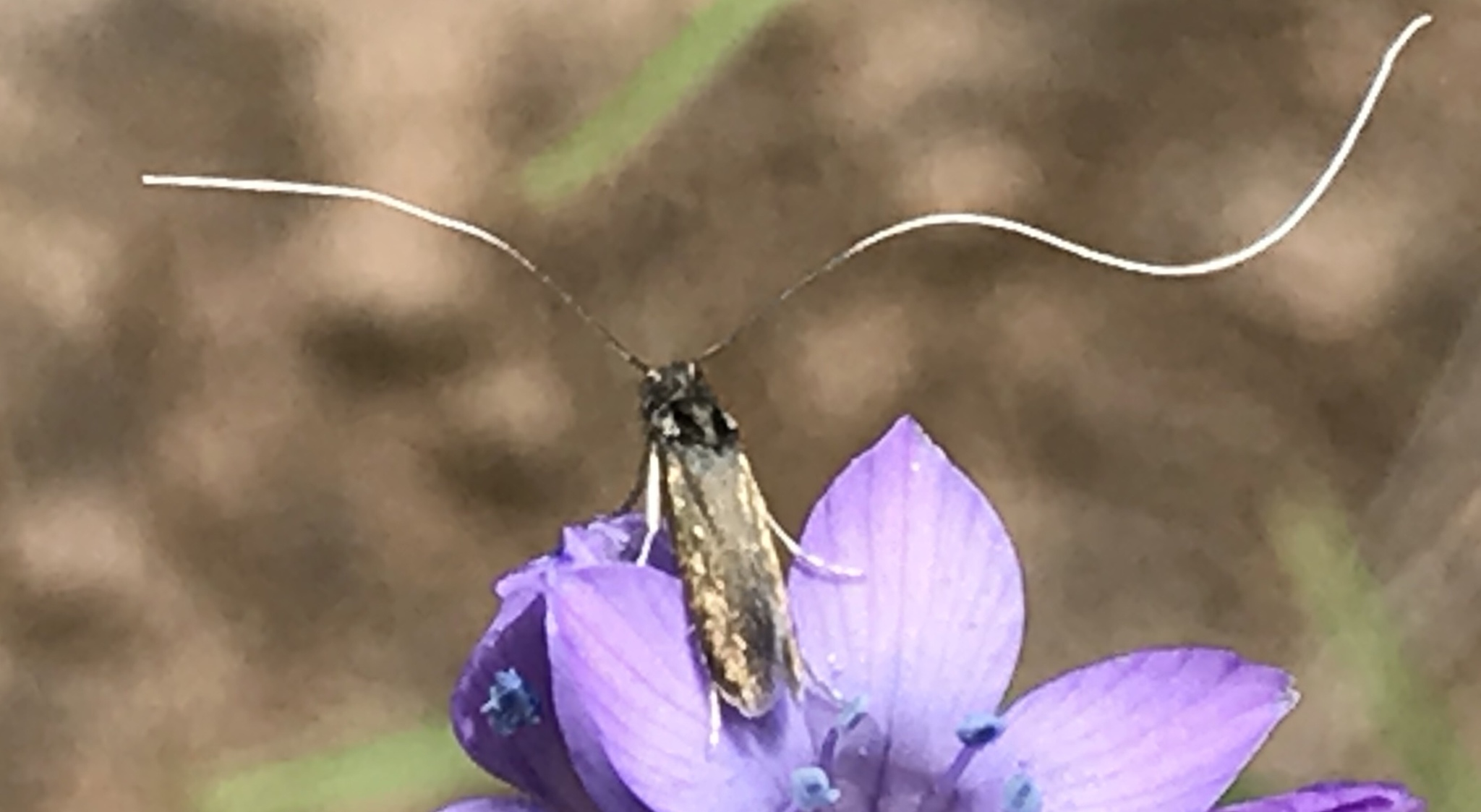

Scientific classification
- Domain: Eukaryota
- Kingdom: Animalia
- Phylum: Arthropoda
- Class: Insecta
- Order: Lepidoptera
- Family: Adelidae
- Genus: Adela
- Species: A. singulella

Binomial name
- Adela singulella Walsingham, 1880

= Adela singulella =

Species of moth

Adela singulella is a moth of the family Adelidae or fairy longhorn moths. It was described by Walsingham in 1880. It is found in California.

Adults are on the wing from mid May to mid June north of San Francisco Bay, the central Sierra Nevada and the San Gabriel Mountains. In the southern part of the Coast Range and the southern Sierra Nevada, adults have been recorded in April.

The larvae feed on the buds of Gilia capitata and Gilia achilleifolia.
