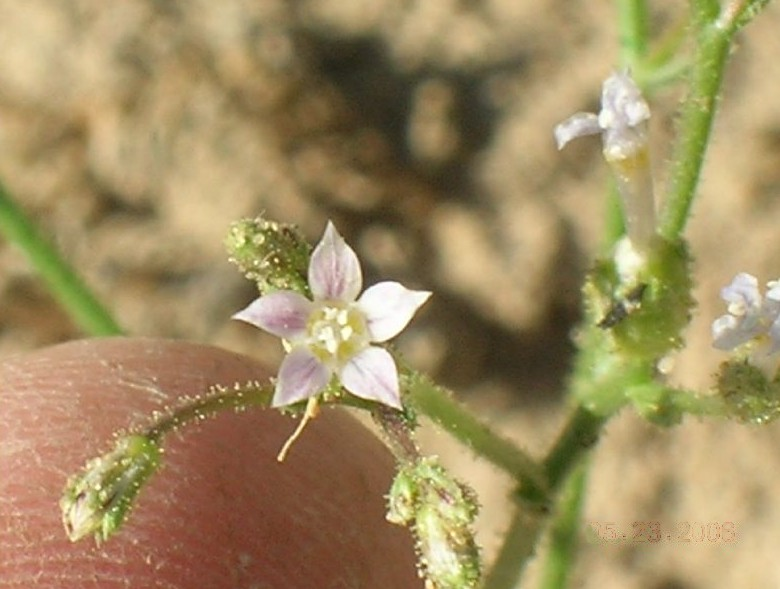

Conservation status
- Secure (NatureServe)

Scientific classification
- Kingdom: Plantae
- Clade: Embryophytes
- Clade: Tracheophytes
- Clade: Spermatophytes
- Clade: Angiosperms
- Clade: Eudicots
- Clade: Asterids
- Order: Ericales
- Family: Polemoniaceae
- Genus: Gilia
- Species: G. sinuata

Binomial name
- Gilia sinuata Dougl. ex Benth.

= Gilia sinuata =

Plant species in the family

Gilia sinuata is a species of flowering plant in the phlox family known by the common names rosy gilia and rosy phlox. It is native to western North America from British Columbia to New Mexico, where it can be found in a number of open habitats, generally in sandy soil, and at elevations from 500 to 7500 feet.

== Description ==
This wildflower produces a basal rosette of toothed leaves from which grow one or more erect, multibranched stems. The stems are glandular and are pale green with pinkish or purplish tinting and have a few scattered toothed leaves, especially near branching junctions.

The inflorescence holds a cluster of rounded flowers, each on a short pedicel. Each flower has a long, tubular throat which is pink or lavender, often striped in white. It opens into a flat-faced or somewhat bell-shaped corolla with five lavender or pinkish lobes. Normal bloom time is from March to June depending on latitude/elevation.

Its fruit is a capsule which has three divisions and holds two to eight seeds in two rows.

== Taxonomy ==
The botanist George Bentham described Gilia sinuata as a new species in the genus Gilia in 1845, crediting the work of David Douglas. Together with its genus it is classified in the Polemoniaceae family. It was described as a variety of Gilia inconspicua by Asa Gray in 1876 and as a subspecies by August Brand in 1907. It was also described as a variety of Gilia tenuiflora by Willis Linn Jepson in 1943, but is listed as an accepted species by Plants of the World Online.

== Range ==
It is native to southwestern Canada, the western United States, and northwestern Mexico. However, in Canada it only grew in British Columbia where it is believed to be extirpated, locally extinct. In the United States it is native to Idaho, Washington, and Oregon in the Pacific Northwest. It is found in every state of the southwest and as far east as Colorado and New Mexico. In Mexico it only grows in Baja California and Sonora.
