= Gilia austrooccidentalis =

Conservation status
- Imperiled (NatureServe)

Scientific classification
- Kingdom: Plantae
- Clade: Tracheophytes
- Clade: Angiosperms
- Clade: Eudicots
- Clade: Asterids
- Order: Ericales
- Family: Polemoniaceae
- Genus: Gilia
- Species: G. austrooccidentalis

Binomial name
- Gilia austrooccidentalis (A.D.Grant & V.E.Grant) A.D.Grant & V.E.Grant

Species of flowering plant

Gilia austrooccidentalis is a species of flowering plant in the phlox family known by the common name southwestern gilia. The scientific name is sometimes spelt Gilia austro-occidentalis. It is endemic to the Central Coast Ranges of California, where it grows in local hill and valley habitat.

== Description ==
It is a slender herb producing a very glandular stem sometimes laced with cobwebby fibers. The lobed leaves are located in a rosette around the base of the stem. The inflorescence is a cluster of flowers dotted with glands and webby hairs. The sepals are green to purple and ribbed with membrane between the ribs. The corolla is purple with a yellowish throat.

== Taxonomy ==
The species was first described in 1956 as Gilia inconspicua subsp. austrooccidentalis. It was raised to a full species in 1960. In both cases, the authors spelt the epithet without a hyphen, as does the International Plant Names Index. The Jepson eFlora spells the name with a hyphen.
