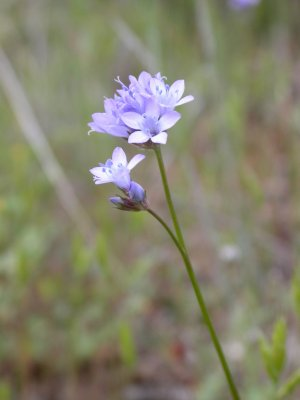
- Gilia achilleifolia

Scientific classification
- Kingdom: Plantae
- Clade: Embryophytes
- Clade: Tracheophytes
- Clade: Angiosperms
- Clade: Eudicots
- Clade: Asterids
- Order: Ericales
- Family: Polemoniaceae
- Genus: Gilia; Ruiz & Pav.

Species
- 39; see text

Synonyms
- Aegochloa Benth. (1833); Brickellia Raf. (1808); Rossmaesslera Rchb. (1841)

= Gilia =

Genus of flowering plants

Gilia is a genus of flowering plants in the Polemoniaceae family and is related to phlox. It includes 39 species native to the Americas, ranging from British Columbia to Texas and northern Mexico, and to Ohio, in North America, and from Ecuador and Peru to southern Chile and Argentina in South America. These Western native plants are best sown in sunny, well-draining soil in the temperate and tropical regions of the Americas, where they occur mainly in desert or semi-desert habitats

They are summer annuals, rarely perennials, growing to 10–120 cm (4-48 in) tall. The leaves are spirally arranged, usually pinnate (rarely simple), forming a basal rosette in most species. The flowers are produced in a panicle, with a five-lobed corolla, which can be blue, white, pink or yellow.

Gilia species are used as food plants by the larvae of some Lepidoptera species including Schinia aurantiaca and Schinia biundulata (the latter feeds exclusively on G. cana).

== Species ==
39 species are accepted.

- Gilia achilleifolia Benth. – California gilia
- Gilia aliquanta A.D.Grant & V.E.Grant – Puffcalyx gilia
- Gilia angelensis V.E.Grant – Chaparral gilia
- Gilia austrooccidentalis (A.D.Grant & V.E.Grant) A.D.Grant & V.E.Grant – Southwestern gilia
- Gilia brecciarum M.E.Jones – Nevada gilia
- Gilia cana (M.E.Jones) A.Heller – Showy gilia
- Gilia capitata Sims – Bluehead gilia / globe gilia
- Gilia clivorum (Jeps.) V.E.Grant – Purplespot gilia
- Gilia clokeyi H.Mason – Clokey's gilia
- Gilia crassifolia Benth.
- Gilia diegensis (Munz) A.D.Grant & V.E.Grant – Coastal gilia
- Gilia flavocincta A.Nelson – Lesser yellowthroat gilia
- Gilia inconspicua (Sm.) Sweet – Shy gilia
- Gilia interior (H.Mason & A.D.Grant) A.D.Grant – Inland gilia
- Gilia karenae Kass & S.L.Welsh
- Gilia lacinata Ruiz & Pav.
- Gilia latiflora (A.Gray) A.Gray – Hollyleaf gilia
- Gilia latimeri T.L.Weese & L.A.Johnson) V.E.Grant
- Gilia leptantha Parish – Fineflower gilia
- Gilia lomensis V.E.Grant
- Gilia lyndana Alfred
- Gilia malior Day & V.E.Grant – Scrub gilia
- Gilia mexicana A.D.Grant & V.E.Grant – El Paso gilia
- Gilia millefoliata Fisch. & C.A.Mey. – Manyleaf gilia
- Gilia minor A.D.Grant & V.E.Grant – Little gilia
- Gilia modocensis Eastw. – Modoc gilia
- Gilia nevinii A.Gray – Nevin's gilia
- Gilia ochroleuca M.E.Jones – Volcanic gilia
- Gilia ophthalmoides Brand – Eyed gilia
- Gilia salticola Eastw. – Salt gilia
- Gilia scopulorum M.E.Jones – Rock gilia
- Gilia sinuata Douglas ex Benth. – Rosy gilia
- Gilia stellata A.Heller – Star gilia
- Gilia tenuiflora Benth. – Greater yellowthroat gilia
- Gilia transmontana (H.Mason & A.D.Grant) A.D.Grant & V.E.Grant – Transmontane gilia
- Gilia tricolor Benth. – Bird's-eye gilia
- Gilia tweedyi Rydb. – Tweedy's gilia
- Gilia valdiviensis Griseb.
- Gilia yorkii Shevock & A.G.Day – Boyden Cave gilia

== Formerly placed here ==
Partial list:

- Aliciella micromeria (A.Gray) J.M.Porter – Great Basin gilia (as Gilia micromeria A.Gray)
- Bryantiella palmeri (S.Watson) J.M.Porter (as Gilia palmeri S.Watson)
- Giliastrum stewartii (I.M.Johnst.) J.M.Porter – Stewart's gilia (as Gilia stewartii I.M.Johnst.)
- Microgilia minutiflora (Benth.) J.M.Porter & L.A.Johnson (as Gilia minutiflora Benth.)
