= Gilia alpina =

Gilia alpina is a botanical synonym of two species of plant:

- Gilia laciniata, synonym published in 1907 by August Brand
- Gilia salticola, synonym published in 1940 by Alice Eastwood
