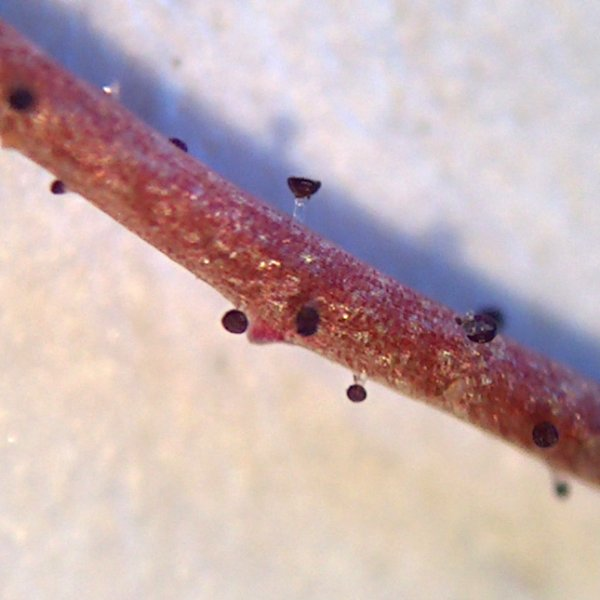
- Close up of stem showing distinctive hairs

Conservation status
- Vulnerable (NatureServe)

Scientific classification
- Kingdom: Plantae
- Clade: Embryophytes
- Clade: Tracheophytes
- Clade: Spermatophytes
- Clade: Angiosperms
- Clade: Eudicots
- Clade: Asterids
- Order: Ericales
- Family: Polemoniaceae
- Genus: Gilia
- Species: G. salticola

Binomial name
- Gilia salticola Eastw.

Synonyms
- Gilia alpina

= Gilia salticola =

Plant species in the phlox family

Gilia salticola is a species of flowering plant in the phlox family known by the common name salt gilia. It is native to the Sierra Nevada and Modoc Plateau of California and western Nevada, where it grows in volcanic and granitic soils.

== Description ==
It is an annual herb. It grows up to 20 centimeters tall, its branching stem coated in cobwebby fibers and speckled with knob-tipped glandular hairs. The leaves gathered about the base of the stem are divided into deep, pointed lobes. The glandular inflorescence produces tubular flowers with ribbed sepals and yellow-throated lavender corollas. Flowers bloom May to June.

== Taxonomy ==
In 1940 botanist Alice Eastwood described a new species in the genus Gilia which she named Gilia alpina, however this name had already been used in 1907 by August Brand making it an illegitimate name. She therefore published it again in 1943 with the name Gilia salticola. In 1956 Alva Day Grant and Verne Grant published a description where it was treated as a subspecies of Gilia leptantha.
