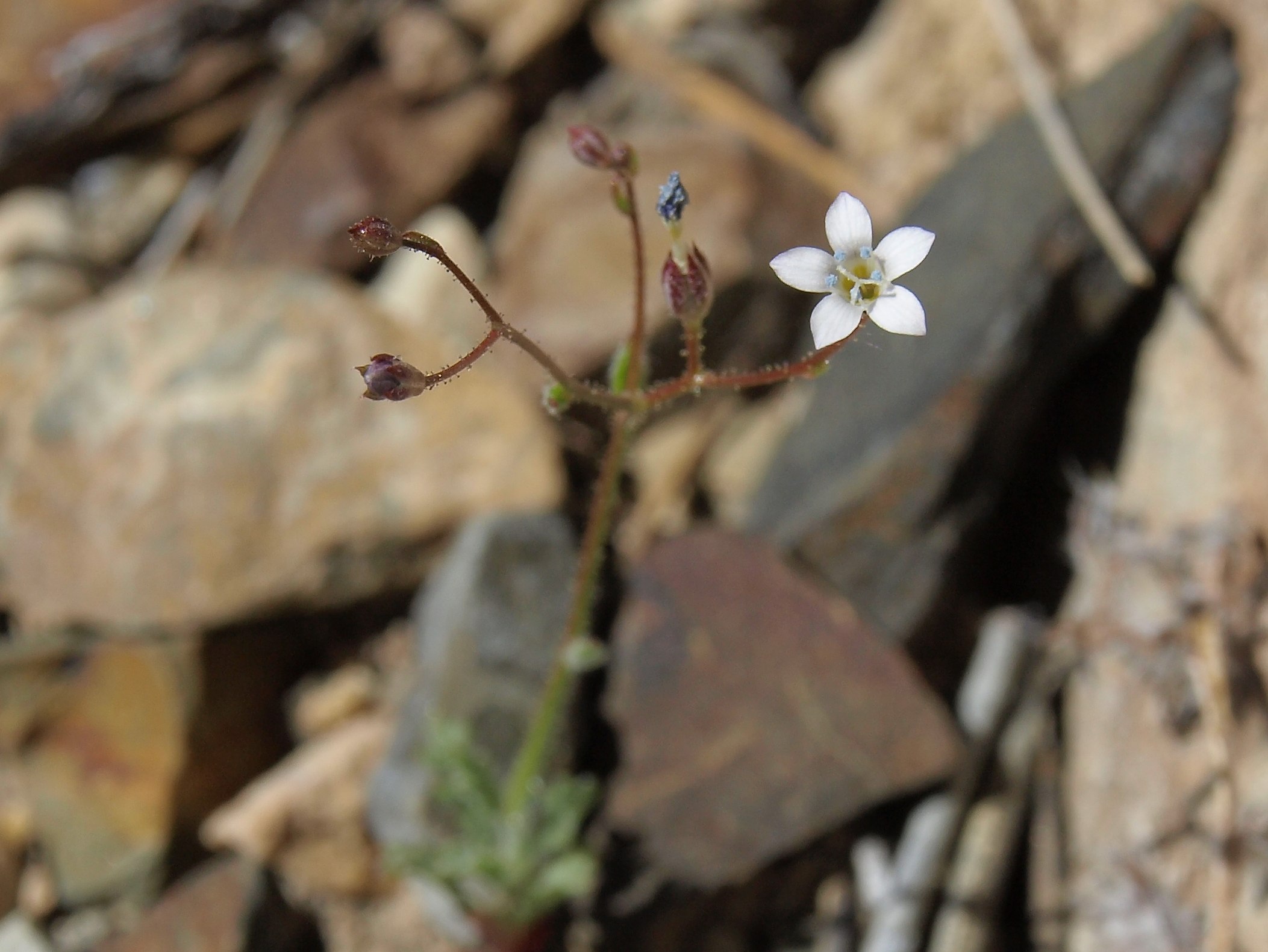

Conservation status
- Secure (NatureServe)

Scientific classification
- Kingdom: Plantae
- Clade: Embryophytes
- Clade: Tracheophytes
- Clade: Spermatophytes
- Clade: Angiosperms
- Clade: Eudicots
- Clade: Asterids
- Order: Ericales
- Family: Polemoniaceae
- Genus: Gilia
- Species: G. clokeyi

Binomial name
- Gilia clokeyi H.Mason

= Gilia clokeyi =

Species of flowering plant

Gilia clokeyi is a species of flowering plant in the phlox family known by the common name Clokey's gilia. It is native to the south-western United States from California to Colorado, where it grows in desert and other habitat.

The herb produces an erect stem up to 17 centimeters tall often coated in cobwebby fibers on the lower parts and glandular hairs above. The lobed leaves are up to 3 centimeters long and are located in a basal rosette at ground level and also on the lower part of the stem.

The top of the stem branches into an inflorescence bearing tiny flowers on thin pedicels. The flower has a pouchlike calyx of sepals made up of ribs with membranous tissue between. The corolla emerges from the calyx, its narrow tubular throat yellow and white spotted and its face white and blue spotted or streaked.

== Taxonomy ==
Gilia clokeyi was scientifically described and named by Herbert Louis Mason in 1942. It was subsequently described as a subspecies of Gilia ochroleuca in 1951 by Mason together with Alva Day Grant and then in 1956 as a subspecies of Gilia ophthalmoides by Alva Grant and Verne Grant. However, it is an accepted species in the genus Gilia according to Plants of the World Online. Together with its genus it is classified in the Polemoniaceae family.

== Range ==
Clokey's gilia is native to the western Unisted States from New Mexico and Colorado westwards to California. In Colorado it grows in a two western counties while in New Mexico it grows in three counties in the northwest corner of the state. It is found through much of southern Utah and northern Arizona, but is both southern Nevada and Washoe County in the northwest. The species is confined to the southeast of California.
