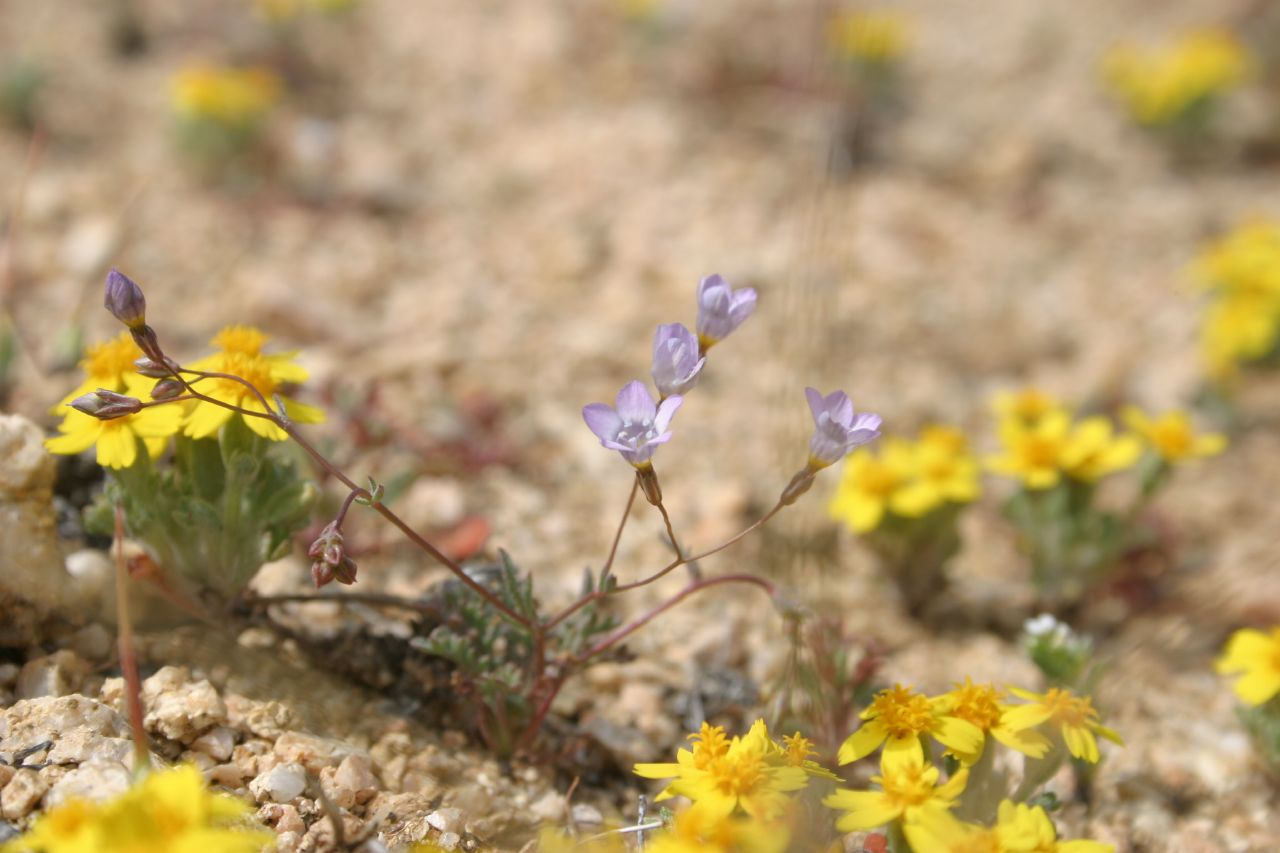
- G. aliquanta amongst yellow Eriophyllum wallacei

Scientific classification
- Kingdom: Plantae
- Clade: Tracheophytes
- Clade: Angiosperms
- Clade: Eudicots
- Clade: Asterids
- Order: Ericales
- Family: Polemoniaceae
- Genus: Gilia
- Species: G. aliquanta

Binomial name
- Gilia aliquanta A.D.Grant & V.E.Grant

= Gilia aliquanta =

Species of flowering plant

Gilia aliquanta is a species of flowering plant in the phlox family known by the common name puffcalyx gilia. It is native to the Sierra Nevada mountains and deserts of southeastern California and southern Nevada.

It is a small herb producing a thin, spreading stem up to about 16 centimeters long, sometimes laced with cobwebby fibers. The fleshy, lobed leaves are each 1 to 3 centimeters long and located in a cluster around the base of the stem. The glandular inflorescence bears one or more flowers, each between one and two centimeters in total length. The base of the flower is a puffy saclike calyx of sepals which is ribbed, thin and membranous between the ribs and purple to purple spotted in color. The face of the flower is a lavender to purple corolla. The fruit is a valved, oval capsule.
