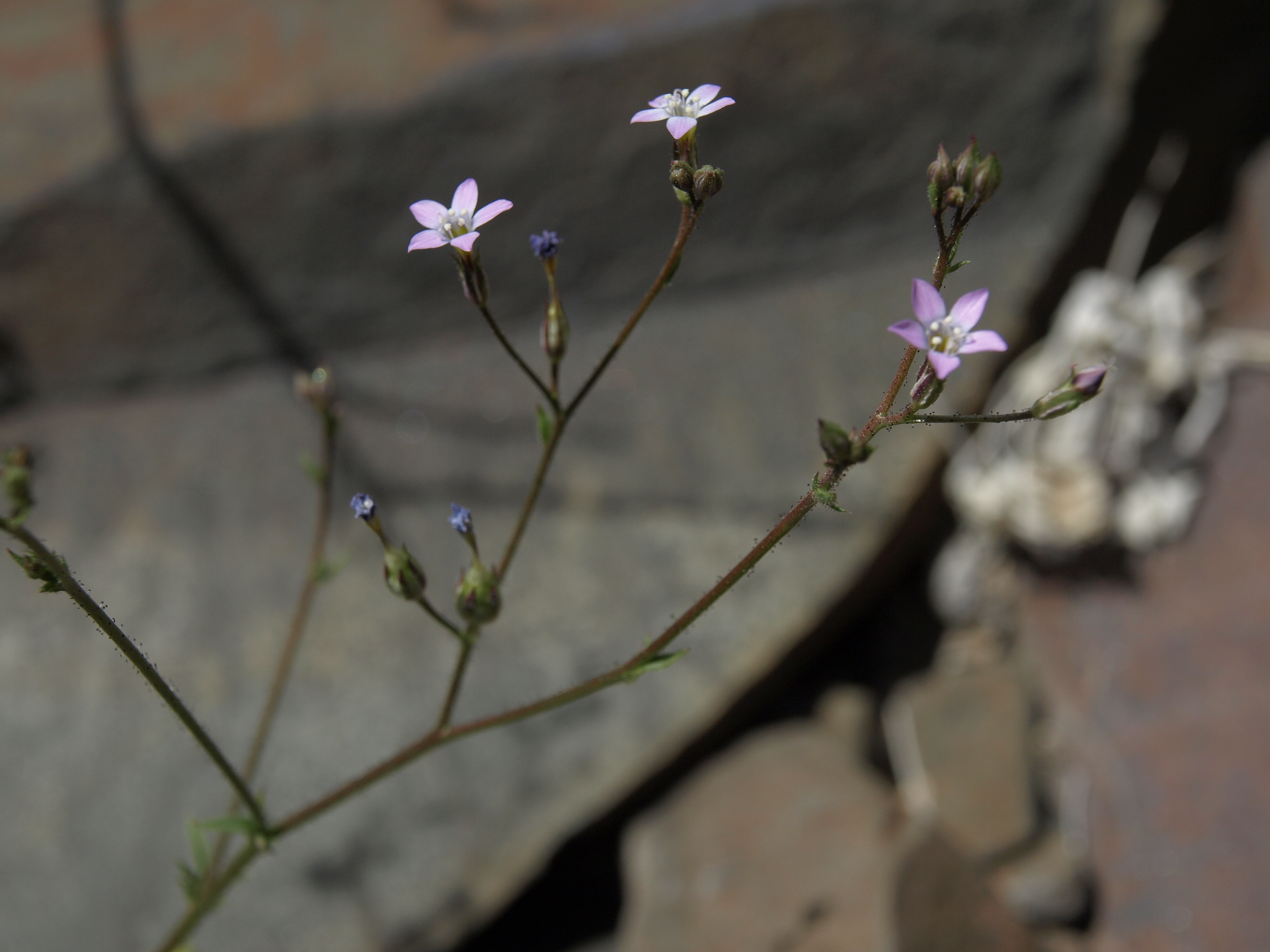
- In White Mountains, California

Conservation status
- Apparently Secure (NatureServe)

Scientific classification
- Kingdom: Plantae
- Clade: Embryophytes
- Clade: Tracheophytes
- Clade: Spermatophytes
- Clade: Angiosperms
- Clade: Eudicots
- Clade: Asterids
- Order: Ericales
- Family: Polemoniaceae
- Genus: Gilia
- Species: G. ophthalmoides

Binomial name
- Gilia ophthalmoides Brand

= Gilia ophthalmoides =

Plant species in the phlox family

Gilia ophthalmoides is a species of flowering plant in the phlox family known by the common name eyed gilia. It is native to the Southwestern United States where it can be found in woodlands and high desert plateau.

== Description ==
This wildflower grows a short branching stem reaching 10 to 30 centimeters long and covered in a coating of cobweb-like fibers and whitish glandular hairs. The leaves mostly located at the ground in a basal rosette and are occasional along the stems. Each hairy leaf is divided into toothy leaflets.

The small flowers have tubular throats which are purplish to yellowish and a centimeter-wide corolla of light pink lobes. The fruit is a capsule a few millimeters long containing several seeds.

== Taxonomy ==
Gilia ophthalmoides was named and scientifically described by August Brand in 1907. It is part of the Gilia genus within the larger Polemoniaceae family and has no botanical synonyms or subspecies.
