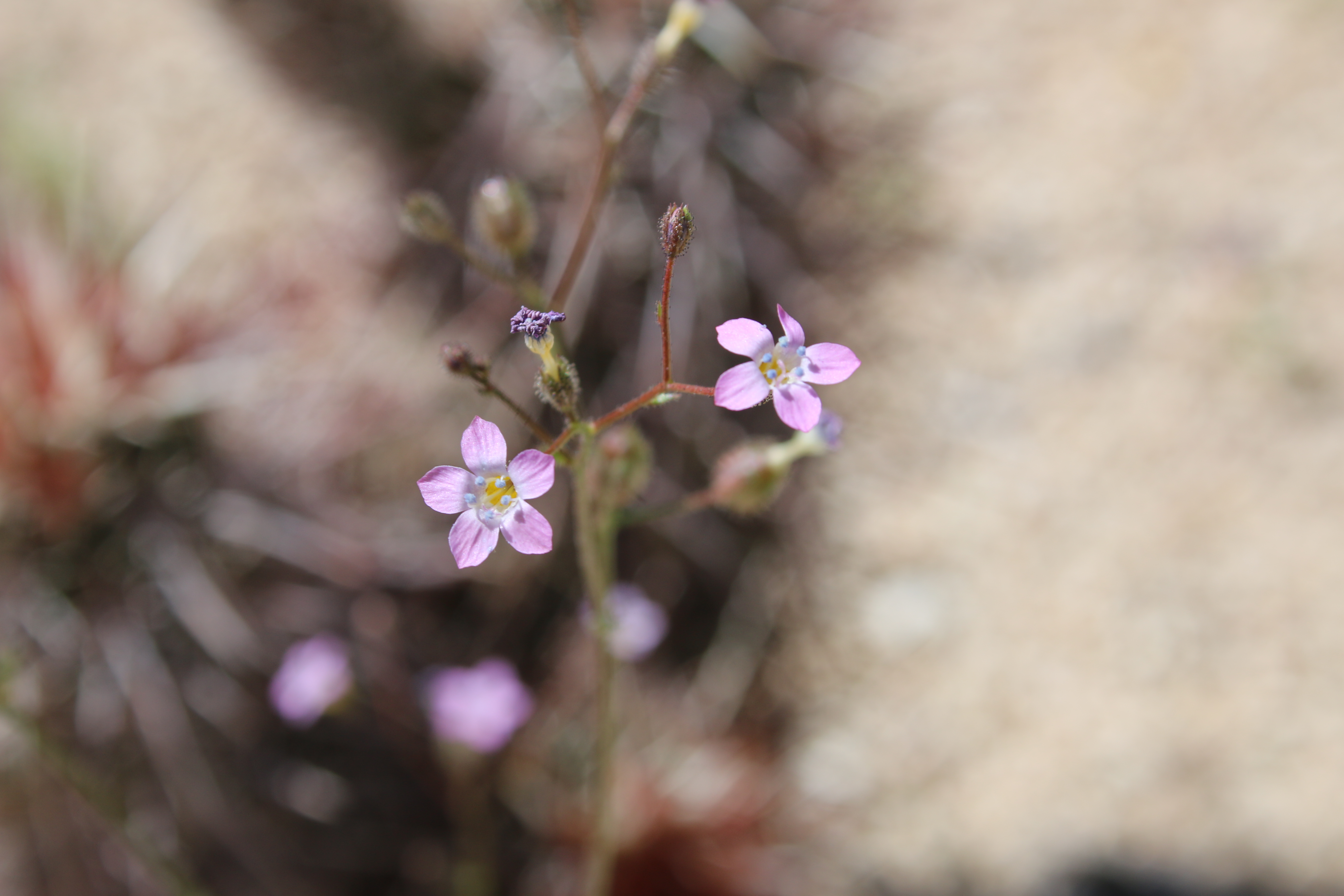

Scientific classification
- Kingdom: Plantae
- Clade: Tracheophytes
- Clade: Angiosperms
- Clade: Eudicots
- Clade: Asterids
- Order: Ericales
- Family: Polemoniaceae
- Genus: Gilia
- Species: G. brecciarum

Binomial name
- Gilia brecciarum M.E.Jones

= Gilia brecciarum =

Species of flowering plant

Gilia brecciarum is an annual flowering plant in the phlox family (Polemoniaceae), known by the common name Nevada gilia or break gilia.

== Range and habitat ==
It is native to the western United States from California and Oregon to Nevada, where it grows in open areas in sandy soils, such as desert, plateau, and dry mountain slopes.

== Growth pattern ==
This is a spindly wildflower with thin, branching stems reaching 10 to 40 centimeters in maximum height.

== Leaves and stems ==
The leaves are made up of multilobed leaflets usually straight and with rounded ends. The stems and foliage are shiny green and covered in cobweb-like fibers, particularly on the lower stem. The herbage has an unpleasant skunklike scent.

== Flowers and fruit ==
Flowers appear in small clustered inflorescences at the ends of the stem branches. Each is on a pedicel covered in hairlike black glands. The glandular flower has a small throat opening into a flat-faced pinkish-lavender corolla with five protruding purple-anthered stamens. The center of the flower and throat may have purple and yellow blotches. The fruit is an egg-shaped capsule about half a centimeter long.
