= Gilia yorkii =

Conservation status
- Imperiled (NatureServe)

Scientific classification
- Kingdom: Plantae
- Clade: Tracheophytes
- Clade: Angiosperms
- Clade: Eudicots
- Clade: Asterids
- Order: Ericales
- Family: Polemoniaceae
- Genus: Gilia
- Species: G. yorkii

Binomial name
- Gilia yorkii Shevock & Day

Species of flowering plant

Gilia yorkii is a rare species of flowering plant in the phlox family known by the common name Boyden Cave gily-flower. It is endemic to Fresno County, California, where it is known from only one location in the southern Sierra Nevada. This plant grows in rock cracks in the limestone cliffs and outcrops in the chaparral and woodlands of the canyon.

== Distribution ==
It was first discovered on July 31, 1995, near Boyden Cave in the Kings River Canyon, and described to science as a new species in 1998. To date there are only three documented occurrences in the vicinity of Boyden Cave.

== Description ==
This is an annual herb with a hairy, glandular stem up to 25 centimeters tall. The leaves are divided into smooth or toothed lobes, the largest leaves near the base of the plant measuring up to 2.5 centimeters long and the uppermost tiny and reduced. The inflorescence bears several flowers on threadlike, gland-studded pedicels. Each flower has a calyx of green sepals and white or pale blue or lavender tubular corolla just under a centimeter long. The pale color of the corolla helps the plant blend into the rocky surroundings, making it easy to miss.
