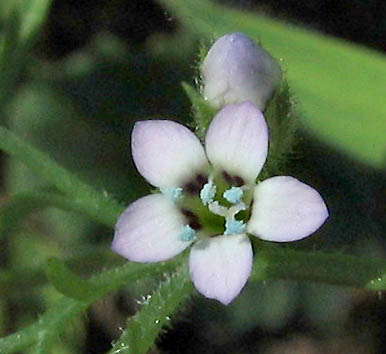

Scientific classification
- Kingdom: Plantae
- Clade: Tracheophytes
- Clade: Angiosperms
- Clade: Eudicots
- Clade: Asterids
- Order: Ericales
- Family: Polemoniaceae
- Genus: Gilia
- Species: G. clivorum

Binomial name
- Gilia clivorum (Jeps.) V.E.Grant

= Gilia clivorum =

Species of flowering plant

Gilia clivorum is a species of flowering plant in the phlox family known by the common names purplespot gilia and many-stemmed gilia. It is native to California and Arizona.

This common wildflower bears a number of erect stems reaching 6 to 30 centimeters in maximum height. It is leafy especially on the lower part of the stems, with each leaf divided into small lance-shaped leaflets.

The inflorescence contains one to five hairy, glandular flowers each less than a centimeter long. The lobes of the corolla are very light to deep purple or blue, and the throat of the flower is lighter in color with dark purple and yellow spots. The fruit is a small capsule containing many seeds.
