= Gilia transmontana =

Conservation status
- Secure (NatureServe)

Scientific classification
- Kingdom: Plantae
- Clade: Tracheophytes
- Clade: Angiosperms
- Clade: Eudicots
- Clade: Asterids
- Order: Ericales
- Family: Polemoniaceae
- Genus: Gilia
- Species: G. transmontana

Binomial name
- Gilia transmontana (H. Mason & A.D. Grant) A.D. Grant & V.E. Grant

Species of flowering plant

Gilia transmontana is a species of flowering plant in the phlox family known by the common name transmontane gilia. It is native to the western United States from California to Utah, where it grows in desert and plateau habitat.

== Description ==
The herb grows up to about 32 centimeters in maximum height, its thin stem surrounded at the base by a rosette of lobed leaves. The glandular inflorescence bears a few loose clusters of flowers each one half to nearly one centimeter wide. The tubular flower has a lavender corolla and a purple-spotted white and yellow throat.
