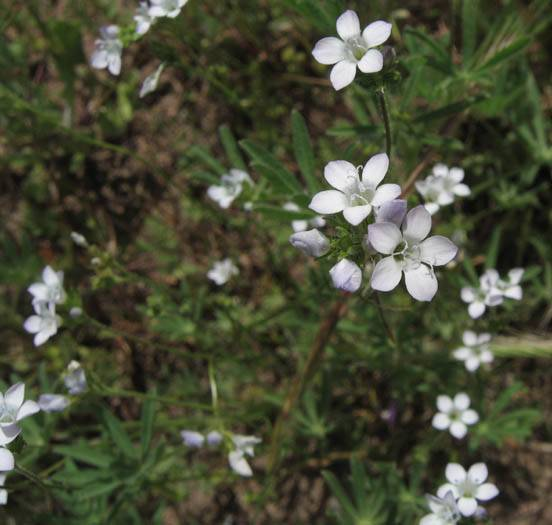

Scientific classification
- Kingdom: Plantae
- Clade: Tracheophytes
- Clade: Angiosperms
- Clade: Eudicots
- Clade: Asterids
- Order: Ericales
- Family: Polemoniaceae
- Genus: Gilia
- Species: G. angelensis

Binomial name
- Gilia angelensis V.E.Grant

= Gilia angelensis =

Species of flowering plant

Gilia angelensis is a species of flowering plant in the phlox family known by the common name chaparral gilia. It is native to the coastal hills and mountains of California and Baja California, where it is a member of the chaparral ecosystem., especially in the Transverse Ranges.

== Description ==
This wildflower, Gilia angelensis, grows a slender, branching stem reaching anywhere from 10 to 70 centimeters in maximum height. Leaves made up of several small leaflets grow clustered on the lower part of the plant. At the ends of the stem branches are clustered inflorescences of petite flowers. Each flower is less than a centimeter wide and very light lavender in color. The fruit is a capsule a few millimeters across containing up to 30 tiny seeds.
