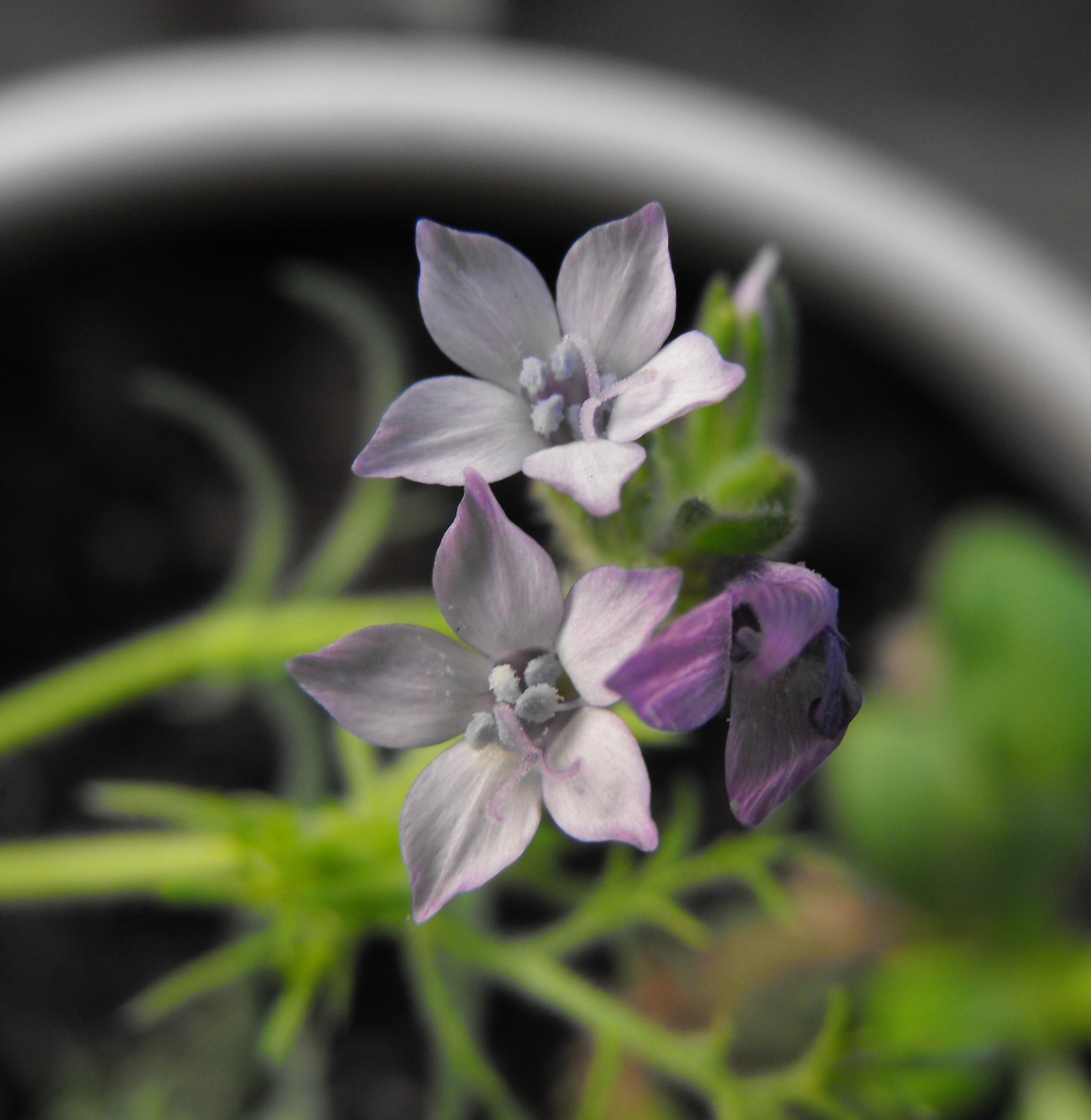

Scientific classification
- Kingdom: Plantae
- Clade: Tracheophytes
- Clade: Angiosperms
- Clade: Eudicots
- Clade: Asterids
- Order: Ericales
- Family: Polemoniaceae
- Genus: Gilia
- Species: G. nevinii

Binomial name
- Gilia nevinii A.Gray

= Gilia nevinii =

Species of flowering plant

Gilia nevinii is an uncommon species of flowering plant in the phlox family known by the common name Nevin's gilia. It is known only from the Channel Islands of California and Guadalupe Island off Baja California, where it grows in seaside canyons and flats. This is an erect herb with a hairy stem up to about 40 centimeters tall lined with deeply lobed leaves. The glandular inflorescence produces yellow-throated lavender flowers 8 to 14 millimeters wide, each with protruding stamens tipped with blue anthers.
