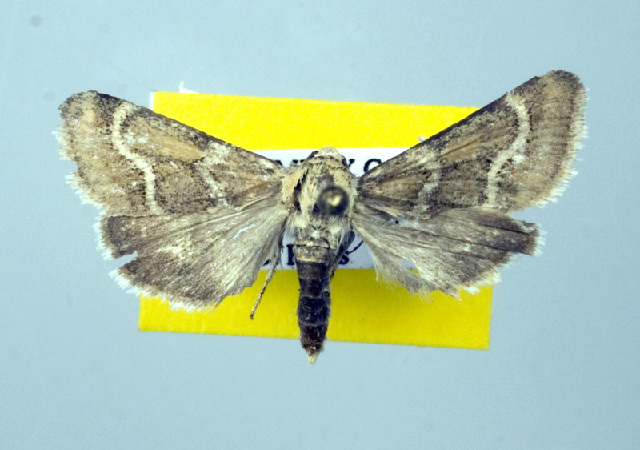

Scientific classification
- Domain: Eukaryota
- Kingdom: Animalia
- Phylum: Arthropoda
- Class: Insecta
- Order: Lepidoptera
- Superfamily: Noctuoidea
- Family: Noctuidae
- Genus: Schinia
- Species: S. biundulata

Binomial name
- Schinia biundulata Smith, 1891

= Schinia biundulata =

Species of moth

Schinia biundulata is a moth of the family Noctuidae. It is found in western North America, including Arizona, California, Idaho, Nevada, Oregon, Texas and Utah.

The wingspan is 20–22 mm.

== Food ==
Gilia cana is used as an exclusive food plant by the larvae of the Lepidoptera species Schinia biundulata.
