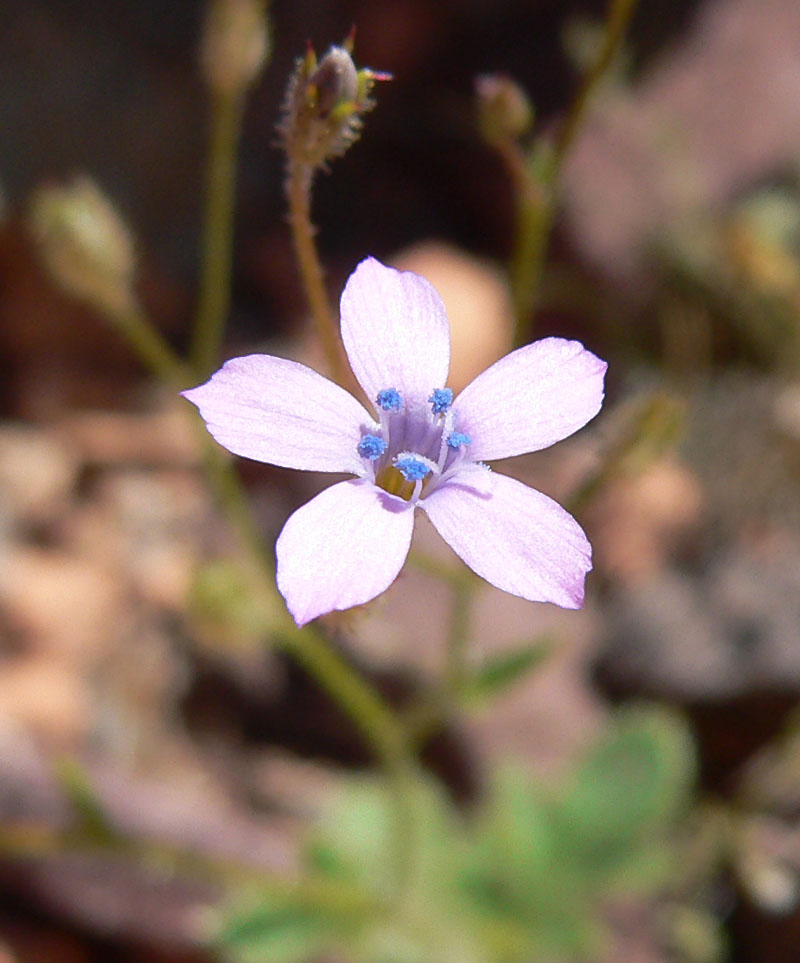

Scientific classification
- Kingdom: Plantae
- Clade: Tracheophytes
- Clade: Angiosperms
- Clade: Eudicots
- Clade: Asterids
- Order: Ericales
- Family: Polemoniaceae
- Genus: Gilia
- Species: G. scopulorum

Binomial name
- Gilia scopulorum M.E.Jones

= Gilia scopulorum =

Species of flowering plant

Gilia scopulorum is a species of flowering plant in the phlox family known by the common names rock gilia and Rocky Mountain gilia. It is native to the Mojave and Sonoran Deserts.

== Description ==
This wildflower produces an erect, branching stem up to 30 centimeters tall from a basal rosette of long, straight leaves. Each leaf is made up of leaflets with pointed teeth, and the herbage is hairy and glandular. The stem branches into inflorescence stalks covered in black hairlike glands. The flowers are one to two centimeters wide and lavender to purple with yellowish or white throats. The fruit is a capsule half a centimeter wide containing many seeds.
