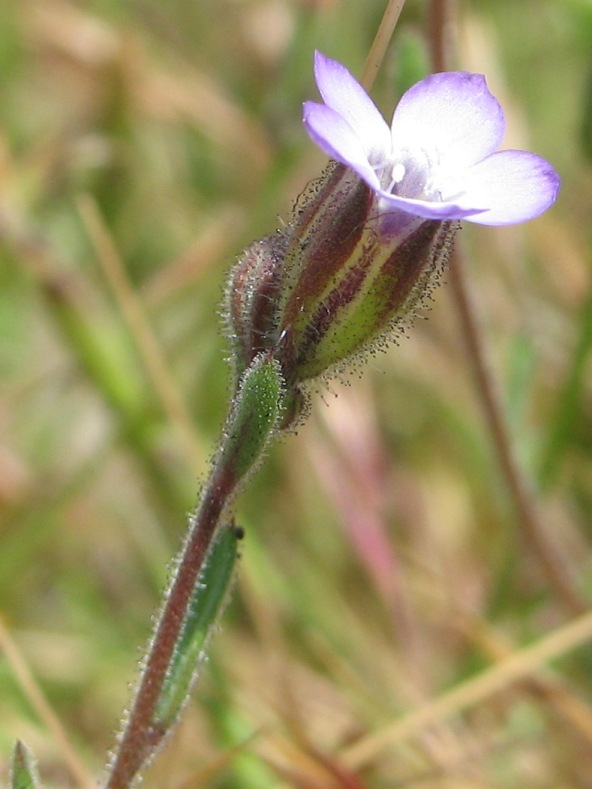

Conservation status
- Imperiled (NatureServe)

Scientific classification
- Kingdom: Plantae
- Clade: Tracheophytes
- Clade: Angiosperms
- Clade: Eudicots
- Clade: Asterids
- Order: Ericales
- Family: Polemoniaceae
- Genus: Gilia
- Species: G. millefoliata

Binomial name
- Gilia millefoliata Fisch. & C.A.Mey.

= Gilia millefoliata =

Species of flowering plant

Gilia millefoliata is a species of flowering plant in the phlox family known by the common name manyleaf gilia. It is native to the coastline of Oregon and northern California, where it grows in sand dune habitat.

== Description ==
This wildflower grows a branching stem reaching maximum heights near 30 centimeters. The stem is dark green with some red coloration and is covered in abundant glandular hairs. The exudate gives the herbage a skunklike scent. The fleshy leaves are mainly located in a basal rosette at the ground and they are sparsely scattered along the stem as well.

The inflorescences at the ends of the stem branches are small clusters of glandular flowers. Each flower is up to a centimeter wide and is mainly lavender to purple with a white or yellowish throat with purple spots in it. The fruit is a small capsule up to a centimeter wide.
