= Gilia minor =

Scientific classification
- Kingdom: Plantae
- Clade: Tracheophytes
- Clade: Angiosperms
- Clade: Eudicots
- Clade: Asterids
- Order: Ericales
- Family: Polemoniaceae
- Genus: Gilia
- Species: G. minor

Binomial name
- Gilia minor A.D.Grant & V.E.Grant

Species of flowering plant

Gilia minor is a species of flowering plant in the phlox family known by the common name little gilia. It is native to the Mojave Desert and it is also present in the coastal Santa Lucia Mountains of central-southern coastal California.

== Description ==
This wildflower grows short, branching, spreading stems up to 20 centimeters in length. The leaves are mainly located in a basal rosette at the ground-level, but are also sparsely distributed along the stems. The herbage may have a coating of white cobweb-like fibers and hairlike glands.

The inflorescence holds one to several small flowers, each under a centimeter wide and bright lavender in color. The throat of the flower is white or yellowish with purple veining and the style and stamens protrude slightly.
