= Ernst Huth =

German naturalist and botanist (1845–1897)

Ernst Huth (27 December 1845, Potsdam – 5 August 1897) was a German naturalist and botanist.

He studied mathematics and natural sciences in Berlin, later working as a secondary school teacher in Frankfurt an der Oder. Beginning in 1883 he published the Monatliche Mittheilungen des Naturwissenschaftlichen Vereins Regierungsbezirkes Frankfurt, in which he was the author of numerous scientific articles.

He is known for his treatment of the botanical family Ranunculaceae, of which he was the taxonomic author of many species, especially plants within the genus Delphinium. In 1908 August Brand named the genus Huthia (synonym Cantua, family Polemoniaceae) in his honor.

== Selected works ==
- Ueber Geokarpe, Amphikarpe, und Heterokarpe Pflanzen, 1890 - On geocarp, amphicarp and heterocarp.
- Monographie der Gattung Caltha, 1891 - Monograph on the genus Caltha.
- Flora von Frankfurt a.Oder und Umgegend, 1895 - Flora of Frankfurt an der Oder and surrounding areas.
- Monographie Der Gattung Delphinium, 1895 - Monograph on the genus Delphinium.
