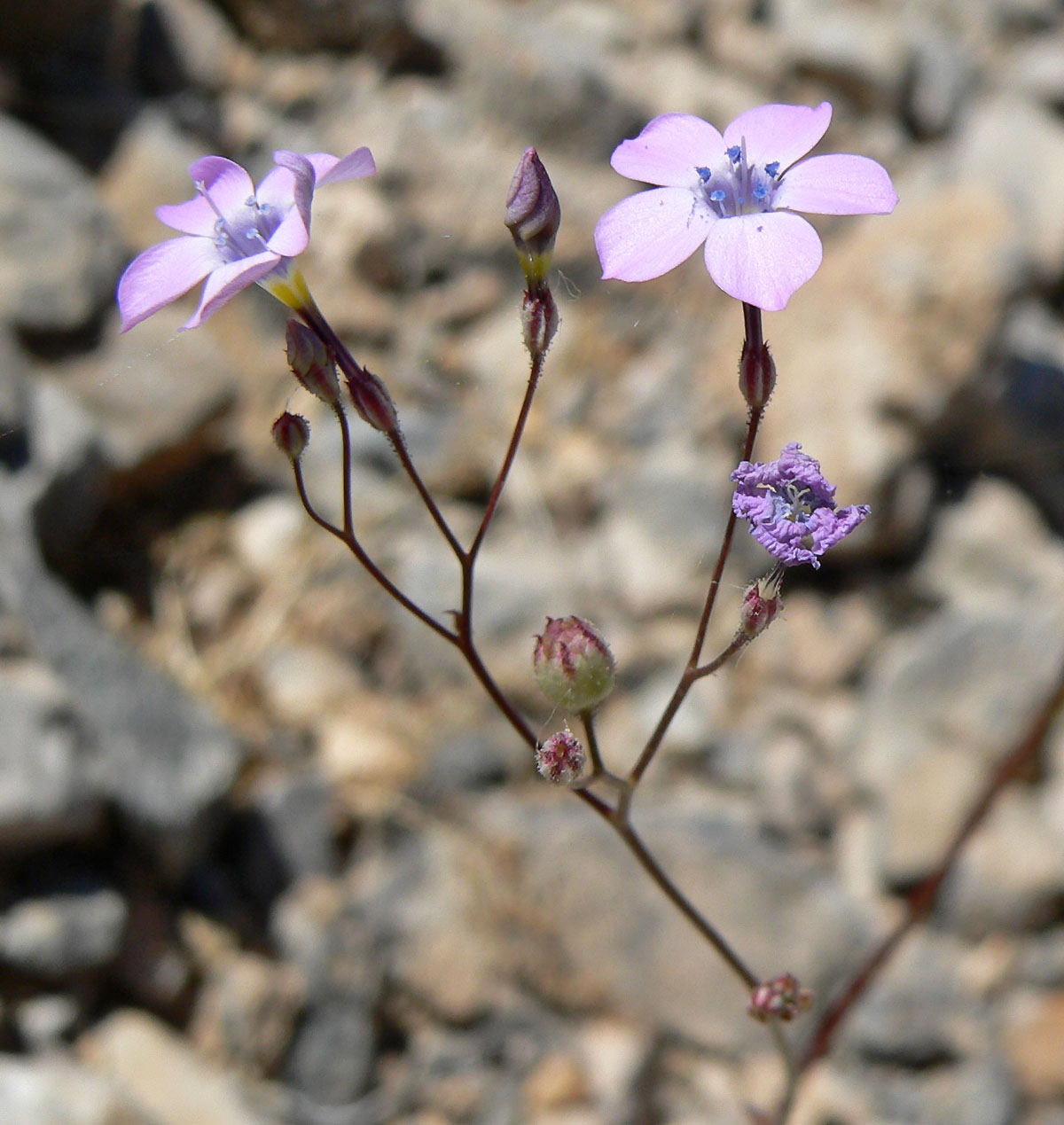

Scientific classification
- Kingdom: Plantae
- Clade: Tracheophytes
- Clade: Angiosperms
- Clade: Eudicots
- Clade: Asterids
- Order: Ericales
- Family: Polemoniaceae
- Genus: Gilia
- Species: G. cana

Binomial name
- Gilia cana (M.E.Jones) A.Heller

= Gilia cana =

Species of flowering plant

Gilia cana is a species of flowering plant in the phlox family known by the common name showy gilia. It is native to California and Nevada where it grows in open areas with gravelly and sandy soils, such as desert and rocky slopes. The Mojave Desert range of some subspecies may extend into Arizona.

== Description ==
This wildflower, Gilia cana, grows a stout, branching stem reaching maximum heights around 30 centimeters. Most of the leaves are arranged in a clumpy rosette at the base of the plant. Each leaf is divided into leaflets with toothlike lobes. The lower part of the stem and leaves may have a coat of cobweb-like fibers. The herbage is glandular and has an unpleasant skunklike scent.

The tops of the stem branches bear spreading inflorescences of glandular purple to pinkish-lavender flowers. Each flower has a short tubular throat which is yellow and blue inside and five slightly protruding stamens with bluish anthers. The fruit is a small, rounded capsule. It is an annual herb and flowers bloom March to August.

== Ecology ==
Gilia cana is used as an exclusive food plant by the larvae of the Lepidoptera—butterfly species Schinia biundulata.
