= Gilia diegensis =

Scientific classification
- Kingdom: Plantae
- Clade: Tracheophytes
- Clade: Angiosperms
- Clade: Eudicots
- Clade: Asterids
- Order: Ericales
- Family: Polemoniaceae
- Genus: Gilia
- Species: G. diegensis

Binomial name
- Gilia diegensis (Munz) A.D. Grant & V.E. Grant

Species of flowering plant

Gilia diegensis is a species of flowering plant in the phlox family known by the common name coastal gilia.

It is native to southern California and Baja California, where it grows in forest and scrub habitat in the Transverse and Peninsular Ranges and the deserts to the east.

== Description ==
Gilia diegensis produces a usually glandular, erect stem up to 40 centimetres (16 in) centimeters tall. The plant forms a flat basal rosette of sharply lobed, deeply cut leaves each up to 7 centimeters long. There are smaller leaves on the stem which are lance-shaped and lined with teeth.

The inflorescence is a cluster of flowers with purple and yellow throats and white to lavender corolla lobes with protruding stamens tipped with blue anthers.
