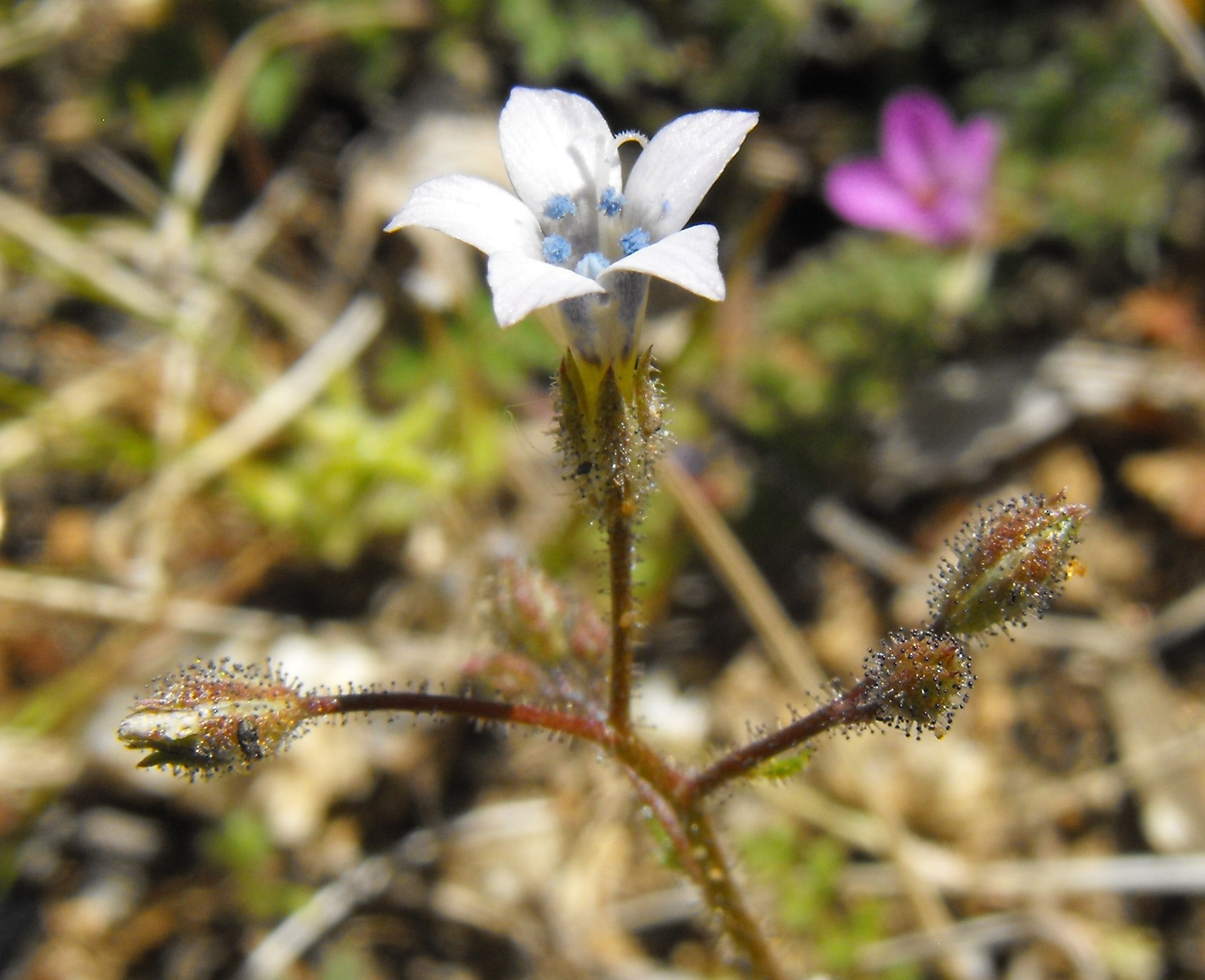

Conservation status
- Apparently Secure (NatureServe)

Scientific classification
- Kingdom: Plantae
- Clade: Tracheophytes
- Clade: Angiosperms
- Clade: Eudicots
- Clade: Asterids
- Order: Ericales
- Family: Polemoniaceae
- Genus: Gilia
- Species: G. stellata

Binomial name
- Gilia stellata A.Heller

= Gilia stellata =

Species of flowering plant

Gilia stellata is a species of flowering plant in the phlox family known by the common name star gilia. It is native to the southwestern United States and northern Mexico, where it is a common resident of desert washes and sandy mountain slopes.

== Description ==
The erect, branching stem reaches a maximum height around 40 centimeters and is coated in stiff, white hairs and stalked glands. Leaves are mostly arranged in a basal rosette at the ground, each leaf composed of toothlike leaflets.

The inflorescence is an array of several small funnel-shaped flowers. Each flower has a corolla of five pointed lobes in shades of light pink or lavender and a yellowish throat.
