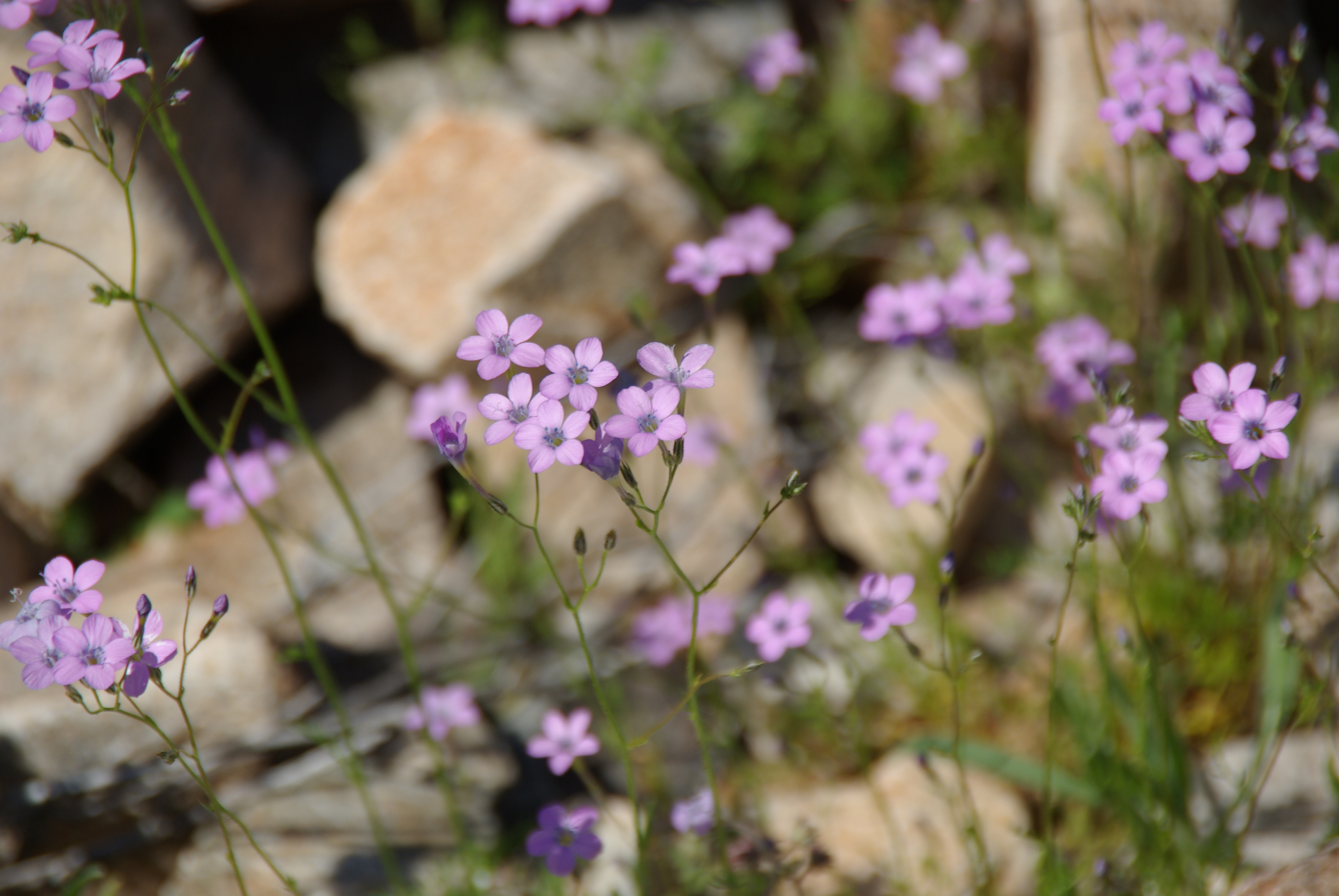

Scientific classification
- Kingdom: Plantae
- Clade: Tracheophytes
- Clade: Angiosperms
- Clade: Eudicots
- Clade: Asterids
- Order: Ericales
- Family: Polemoniaceae
- Genus: Gilia
- Species: G. flavocincta

Binomial name
- Gilia flavocincta A.Nelson

= Gilia flavocincta =

Species of flowering plant

Gilia flavocincta, the lesser yellowthroat gilia, is a plant in the phlox family (Polemoniaceae) found in the Arizona Uplands of the Sonoran Desert. The plants grow in extensive patches of pink-lavender flowers that fill the air with a sweet honey scent.
