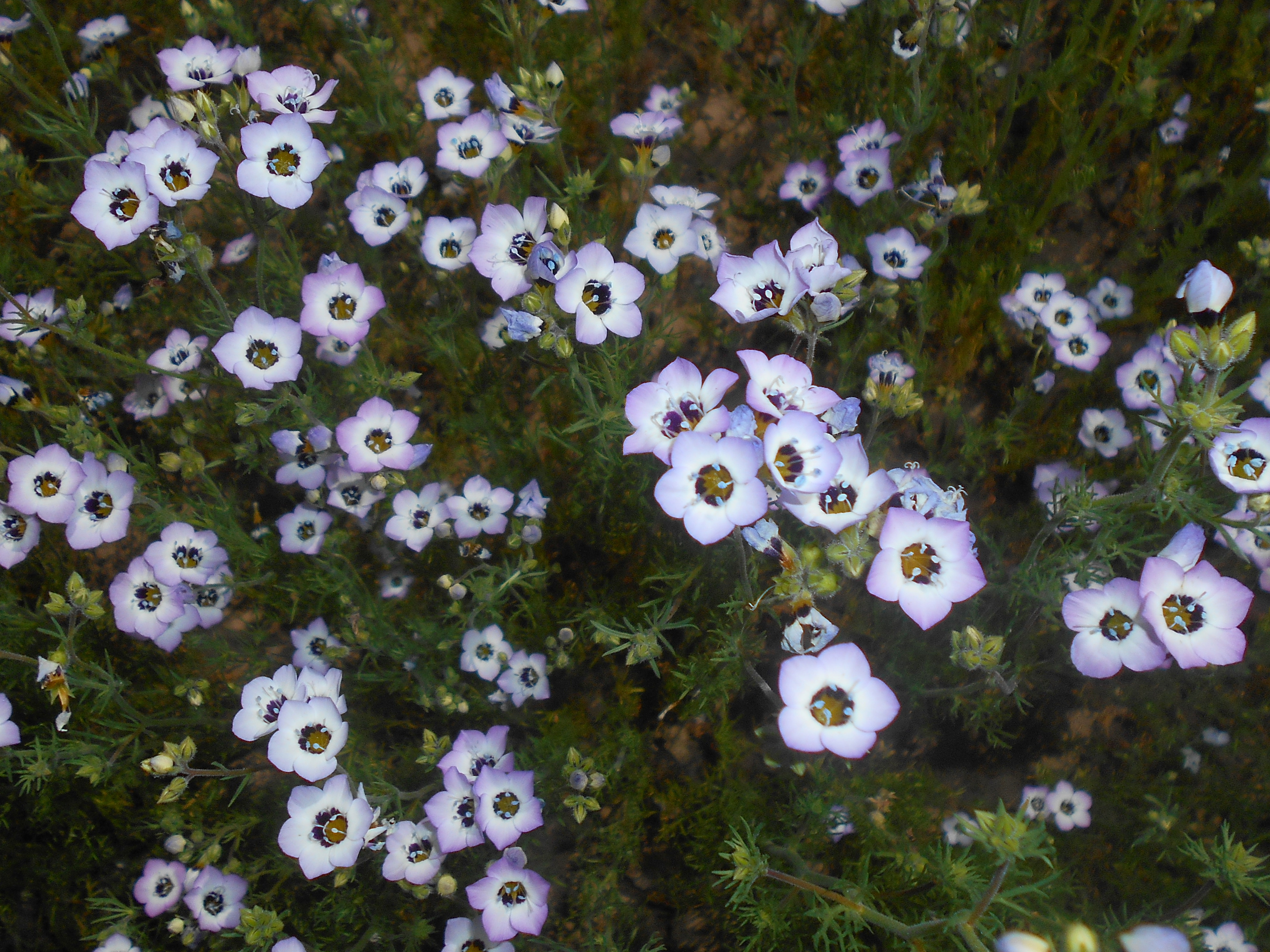

Scientific classification
- Kingdom: Plantae
- Clade: Tracheophytes
- Clade: Angiosperms
- Clade: Eudicots
- Clade: Asterids
- Order: Ericales
- Family: Polemoniaceae
- Genus: Gilia
- Species: G. tricolor

Binomial name
- Gilia tricolor Benth.

= Gilia tricolor =

Species of plant

Gilia tricolor (bird's-eyes, bird's-eye gilia, tricolor gilia) is an annual flowering plant in the phlox family (Polemoniaceae).

== Range and habitat ==
It is native to the Central Valley and foothills of the Sierra Nevada and Coast Ranges in California. Its native habitats include open, grassy plains and slopes below 2,000 feet (610 m). However, there has been some sighting reported on iNaturalist in Western Washington and Southern Western Canada.

== Description ==
=== Inflorescence and fruit ===
Flowers have 5 green sepals and 5 bell-shaped fused petals, which are blue-violet at the end, descending to purple spots over yellow throats, hence the three for "tri".

== Human uses ==
Seeds of this plant are sold online as a garden flower.

== Subspecies ==
- Gilia tricolor ssp. diffusa (Congd.) Mason & A. Grant
- Gilia tricolor ssp. tricolor Benth.

== Gallery ==
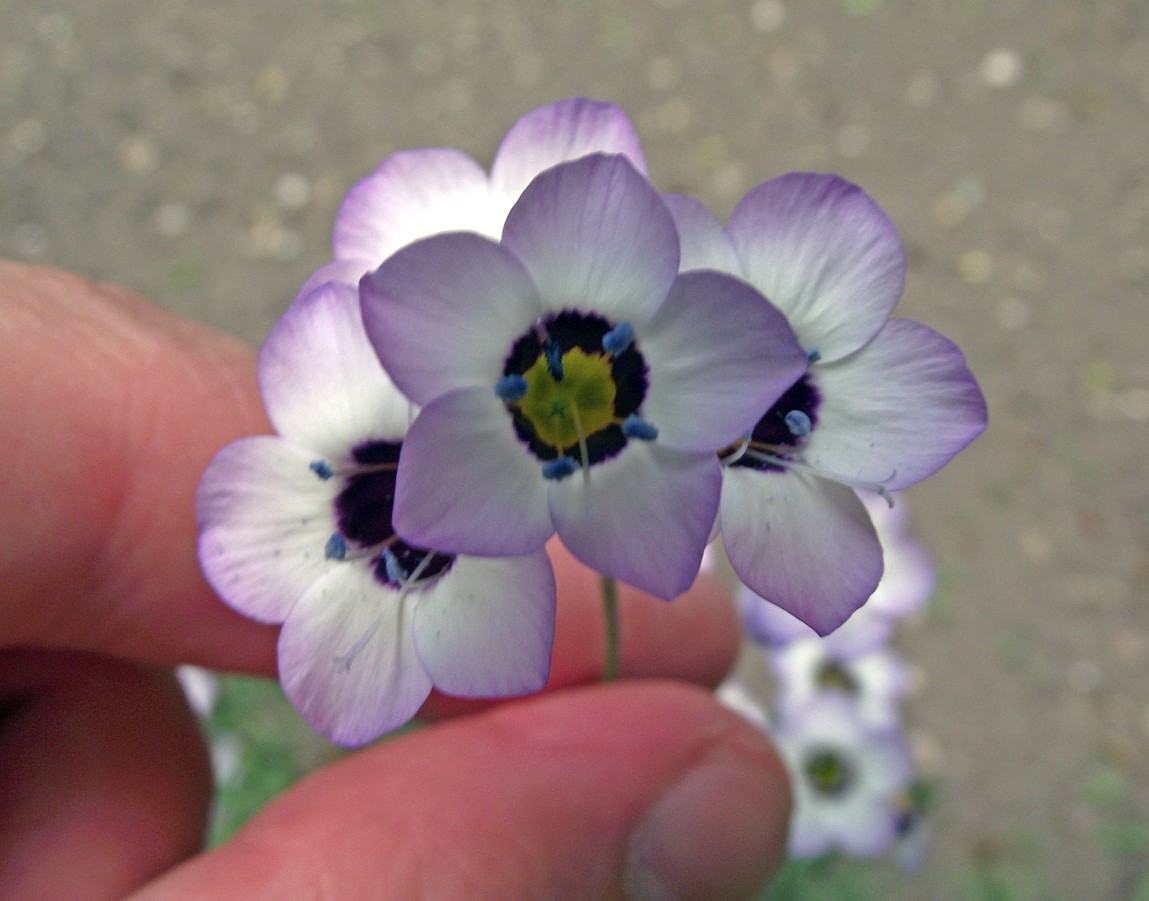
Gilia Tricolor (human hand for scale)

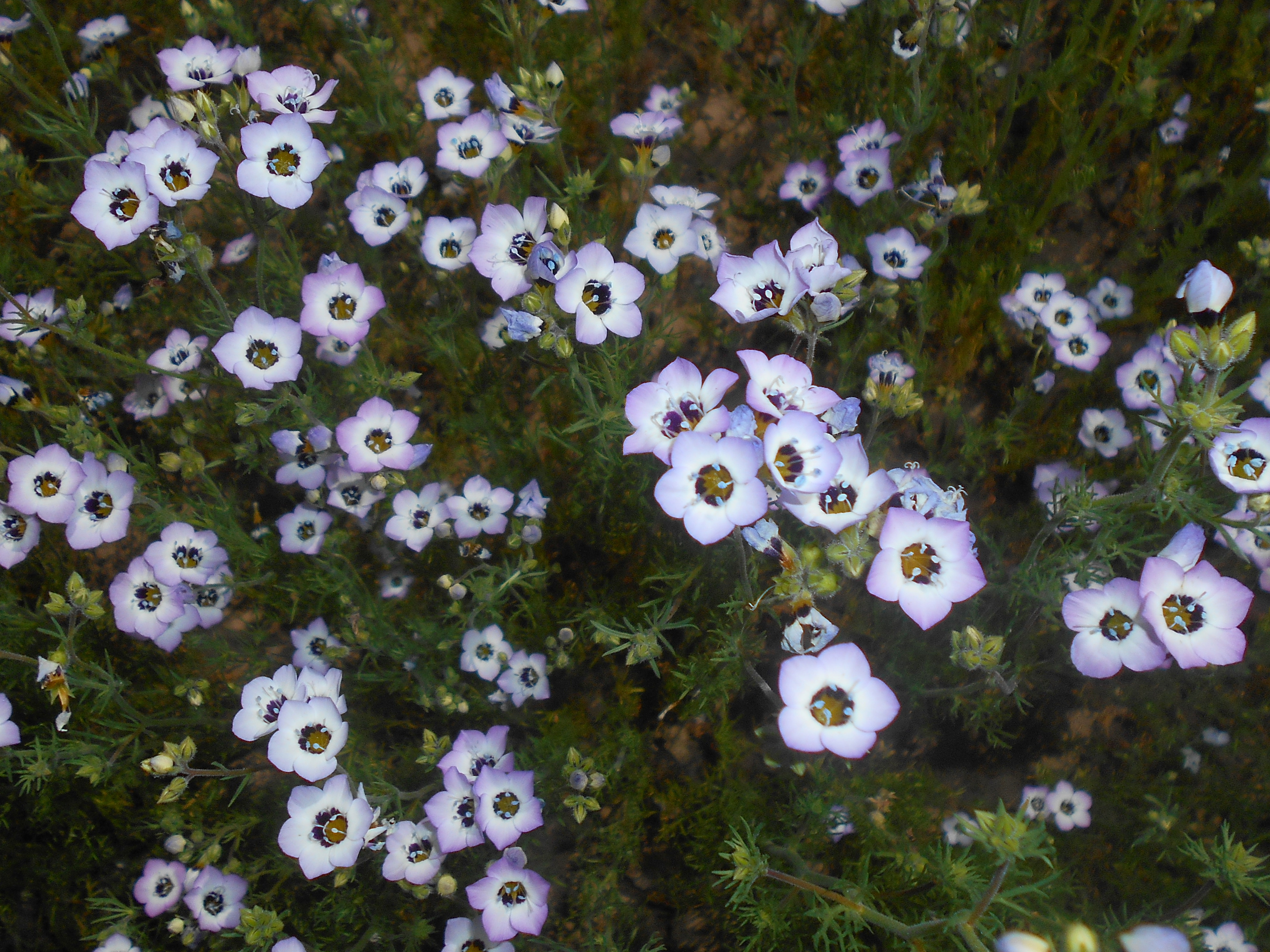
Group of Gilia Tricolor

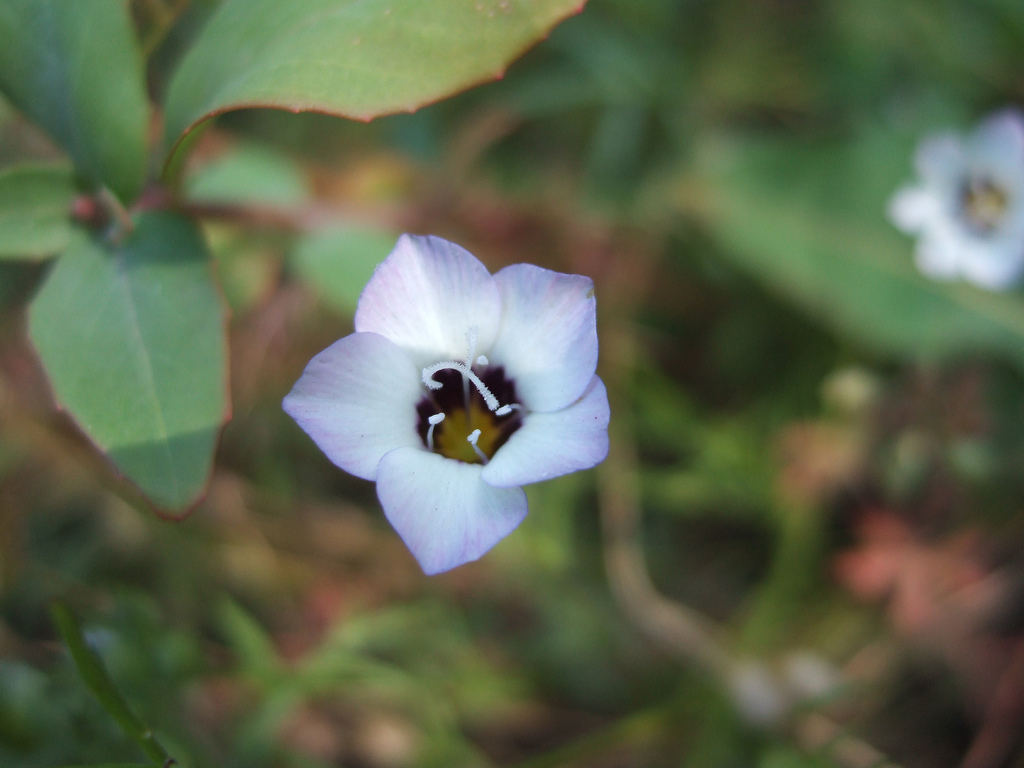
Gilia Tricolor

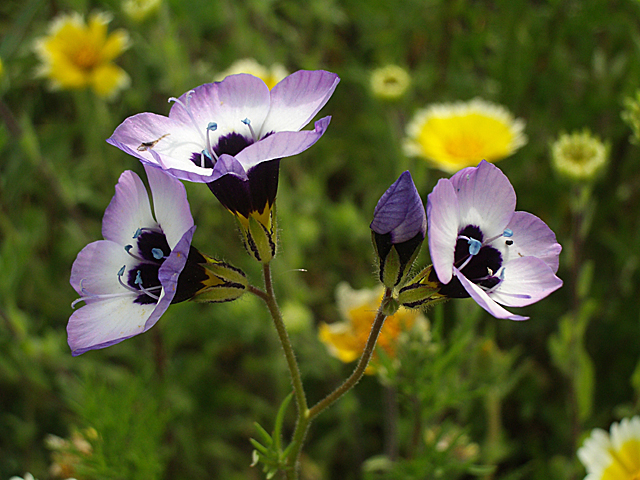
Gilia Tricolor
