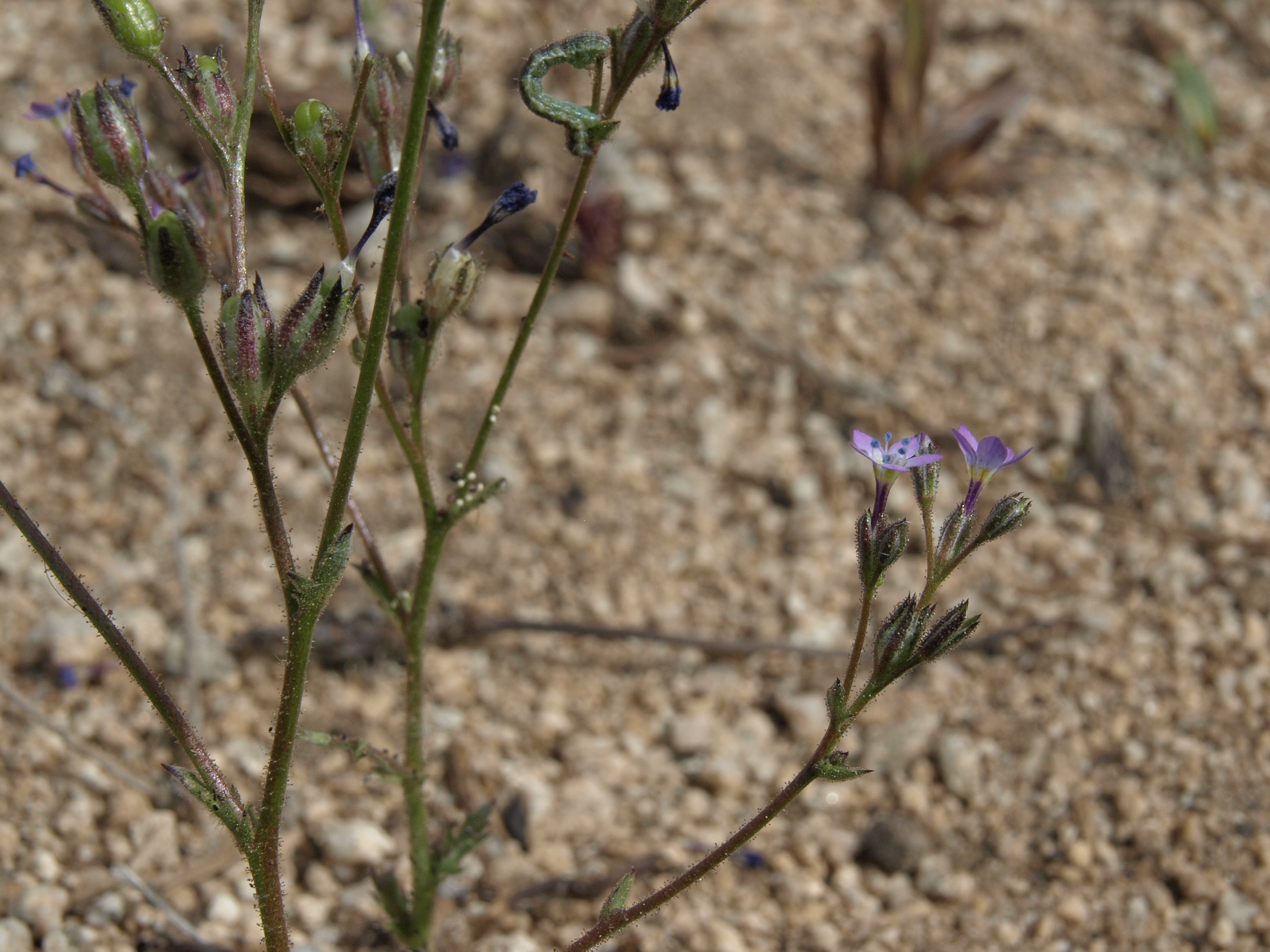

Scientific classification
- Kingdom: Plantae
- Clade: Tracheophytes
- Clade: Angiosperms
- Clade: Eudicots
- Clade: Asterids
- Order: Ericales
- Family: Polemoniaceae
- Genus: Gilia
- Species: G. malior

Binomial name
- Gilia malior Day & V.E.Grant

= Gilia malior =

Species of flowering plant

Gilia malior is a species of flowering plant in the phlox family known by the common name scrub gilia. It is native to California and Nevada, where it grows in sandy and rocky soils in the lower and mountain habitats in the Mojave Desert.

== Description ==
The plant produces spindly, spreading stems which sometimes have clinging, cobweb-like fibers. Leaves appear in a basal rosette and also sparsely along the stems. They are each divided into toothed leaflets. Atop the stem branches are inflorescences of small flowers each up to a centimeter across. The pedicels bearing the flowers are abundantly coated in stalklike glandular hairs. Each small flower is lavender with a white or yellowish throat and tiny protruding stamens.
