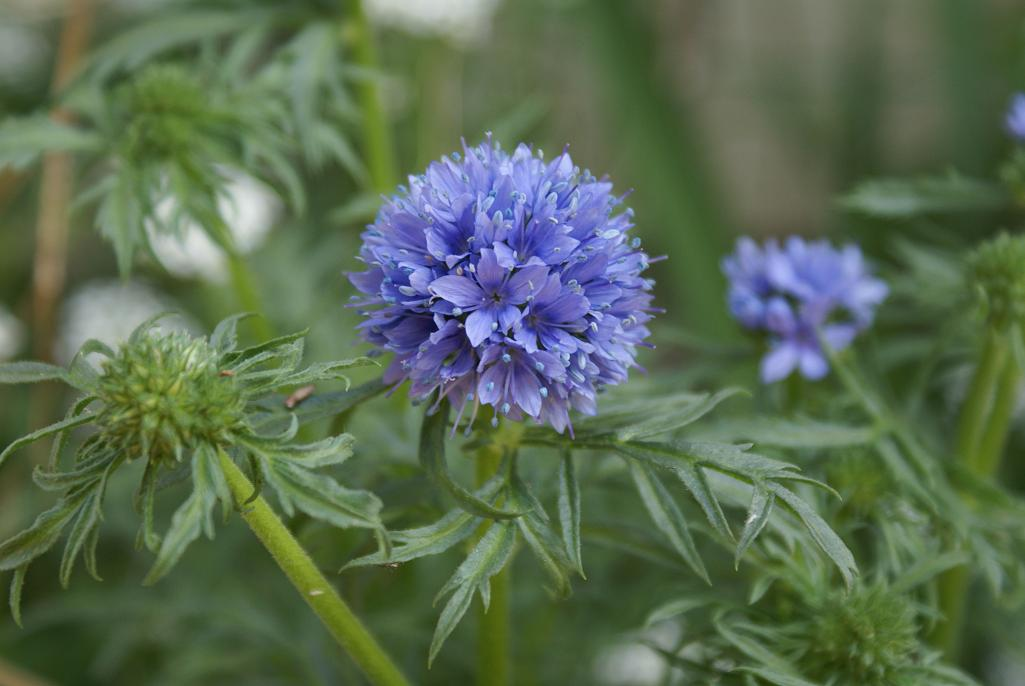

Scientific classification
- Kingdom: Plantae
- Clade: Tracheophytes
- Clade: Angiosperms
- Clade: Eudicots
- Clade: Asterids
- Order: Ericales
- Family: Polemoniaceae
- Genus: Gilia
- Species: G. capitata

Binomial name
- Gilia capitata Sims

= Gilia capitata =

Species of flowering plant

Gilia capitata is a species of flowering plant in the phlox family known by the common names blue-thimble-flower, bluehead gilia, blue field gilia, and globe gilia.

== Distribution ==
It is native to much of western North America from Alaska to northern Mexico, and it can be found on the eastern side of the continent as an introduced species as it is used in pollinator gardens. It grows in many habitats, especially in sandy or rocky soils.

== Description ==
Gilia capitata is an annual herb that is somewhat variable in appearance, with branching, leafy stems reaching anywhere from 10 to 90 centimeters in maximum height and sometimes having glandular hairs on the fleshy herbage. The leaves are divided into toothed or lobed leaflets. Atop the branches of the thick stem are spherical inflorescences of 50 to 100 small flowers. Each flower has a throat opening into a spreading corolla which may be white, pink, lavender, or light blue. The stamens protrude slightly from the flower's mouth and are white with white, blue, or pink anthers. The plant attracts bees and butterflies.

=== Subspecies ===
There are several subspecies, including:

- G. c. ssp. abrotanifolia - native to California and Baja California
- G. c. ssp. capitata - occurs throughout the range of the species
- G. c. ssp. chamissonis (dune gilia) - endemic to the sand dunes of California's central coast; bears bright blue-violet flowers
- G. c. ssp. mediomontana - native to the Sierra Nevada
- G. c. ssp. pacifica - grows along the coastline of Oregon and California
- G. c. ssp. pedemontana - native to the Sierra Nevada foothills
- G. c. ssp. staminea - found in California and Arizona
- G. c. ssp. tomentosa - a rare subspecies known from a few occurrences just north of the San Francisco Bay Area
