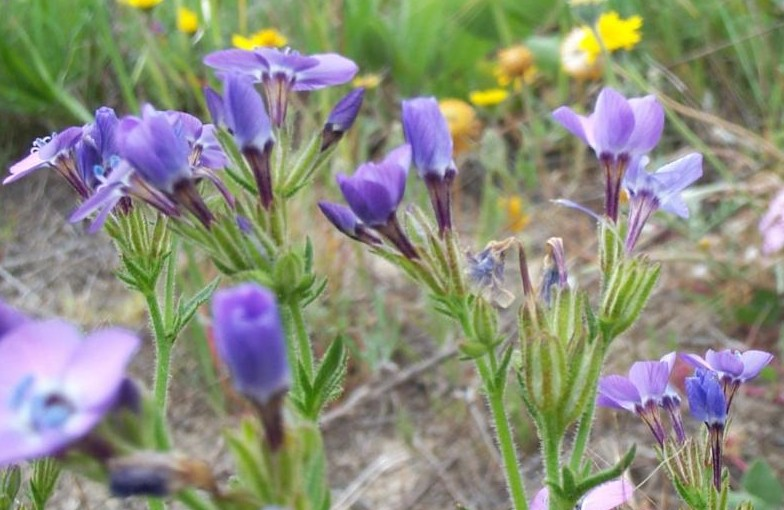
- ssp. hoffmannii

Conservation status
- Vulnerable (NatureServe)

Scientific classification
- Kingdom: Plantae
- Clade: Tracheophytes
- Clade: Angiosperms
- Clade: Eudicots
- Clade: Asterids
- Order: Ericales
- Family: Polemoniaceae
- Genus: Gilia
- Species: G. tenuiflora

Binomial name
- Gilia tenuiflora Benth.

= Gilia tenuiflora =

Species of flowering plant

Gilia tenuiflora is a species of flowering plant in the phlox family known by the common name greater yellowthroat gilia. It is endemic to California, where its distribution spans the central coast and coastal mountains, as well as the Channel Islands.

There are several subspecies, including G. c. ssp. arenaria, the sand gilia or Monterey gilia, which is federally listed as an endangered species. It is known from about 24 occurrences around Monterey Bay. Hoffmann's slender-flowered gilia, ssp. hoffmannii, is also federally endangered and is limited to Santa Rosa Island, one of the Channel Islands of California.

== Description ==
The multibranched stem emerges from a basal rosette of leaves, each leaf divided into long, straight leaflets. The flower is lavender with a long stigma protruding from the throat. Despite the flower's common name, the throat is generally not yellow in color, but purple to white.
