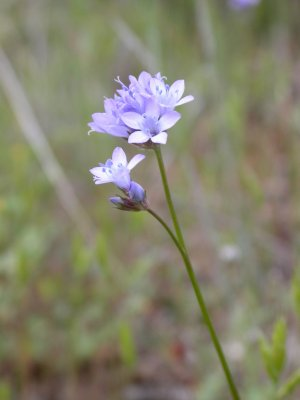

Scientific classification
- Kingdom: Plantae
- Clade: Tracheophytes
- Clade: Angiosperms
- Clade: Eudicots
- Clade: Asterids
- Order: Ericales
- Family: Polemoniaceae
- Genus: Gilia
- Species: G. achilleifolia

Binomial name
- Gilia achilleifolia Benth.

= Gilia achilleifolia =

Species of flowering plant

The annual flowering plant Gilia achilleifolia is known commonly as California gilia, California gily-flower, and blue gilia. It is native to California but grows in other areas of North America where it has been introduced.

The plant is erect with long stems that bear bunches of funnel-shaped lavender flowers. It is a member of the phlox family.
