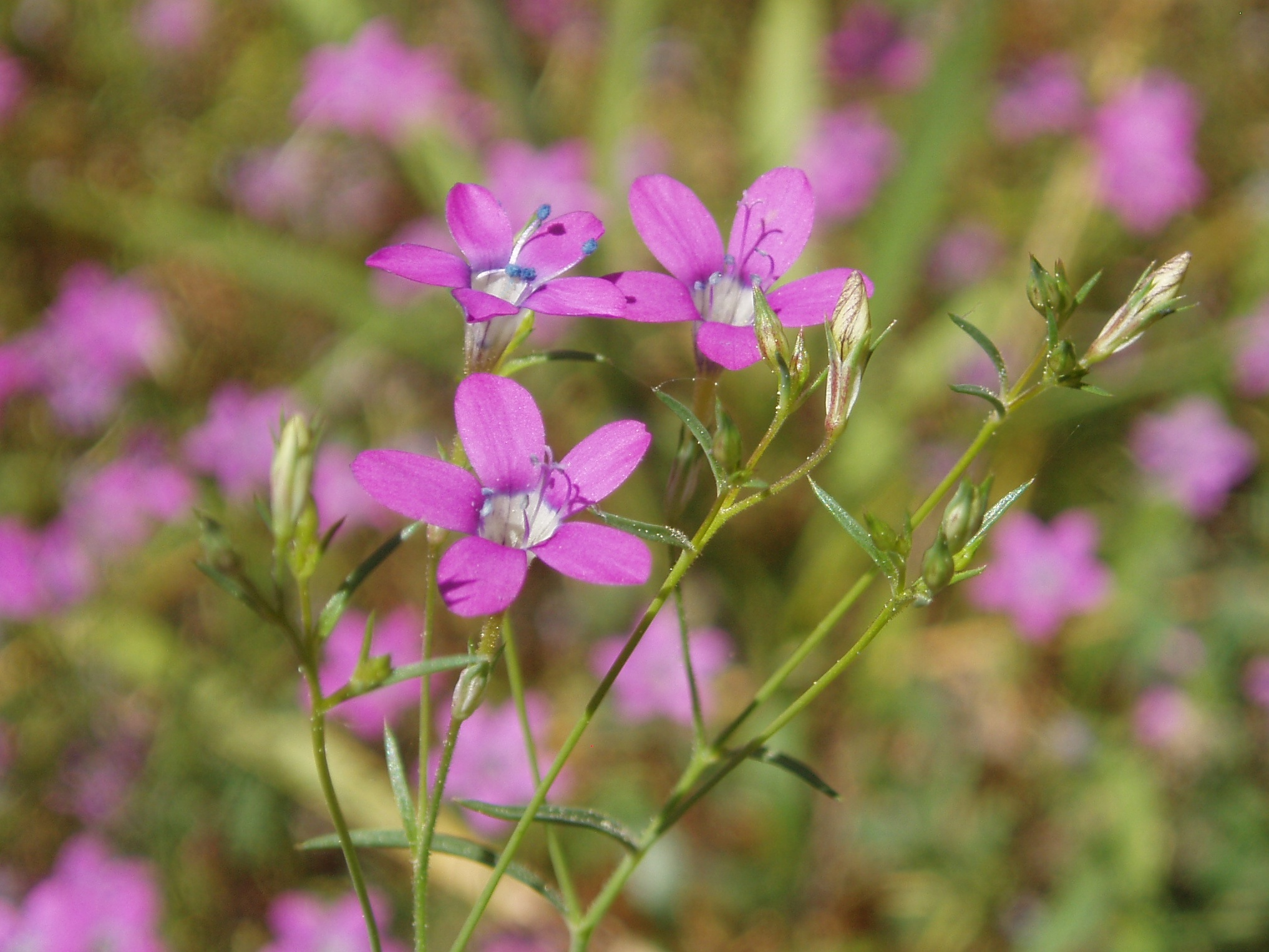

Scientific classification
- Kingdom: Plantae
- Clade: Embryophytes
- Clade: Tracheophytes
- Clade: Spermatophytes
- Clade: Angiosperms
- Clade: Eudicots
- Clade: Asterids
- Order: Ericales
- Family: Polemoniaceae
- Genus: Gilia
- Species: G. leptantha

Binomial name
- Gilia leptantha Parish

= Gilia leptantha =

Species of flowering plant

Gilia leptantha is a species of flowering plant in the phlox family known by the common name fineflower gilia.

It is native to California and southern Nevada, where it grows in open mountain and desert habitats.

== Description ==
Gilia leptantha is a small, mostly erect herb with a glandular stem often coated in cobwebby fibers. The leaves are arranged in a rounded basal rosette, each leaf divided sharply into many subdivided lobes.

The top of the stem is an inflorescence of a few pink to lavender flowers with yellow and white throats. The base of the flower is a thin, glandular tube.
