= Microgilia =

Scientific classification
- Kingdom: Plantae
- Clade: Tracheophytes
- Clade: Angiosperms
- Clade: Eudicots
- Clade: Asterids
- Order: Ericales
- Family: Polemoniaceae
- Genus: Microgilia; J.M.Porter & L.A.Johnson (2000)
- Species: M. minutiflora

Binomial name
- Microgilia minutiflora (Benth.) J.M.Porter & L.A.Johnson (2000)

Synonyms
- Collomia linoides Nutt. (1848); Gilia minutiflora Benth. (1845) (basionym); Gilia minutiflora var. tweedyi Brand (1907); Ipomopsis minutiflora (Benth.) V.E.Grant (1956); Navarretia minutiflora (Benth.) Kuntze (1891)

Genus of flowering plants

Microgilia minutiflora is a species of flowering plant in the family Polemoniaceae. It is the sole species in genus Microgilia. It is an annual native to Idaho, Montana, Oregon, Washington in the northwestern United States and to British Columbia in western Canada.
