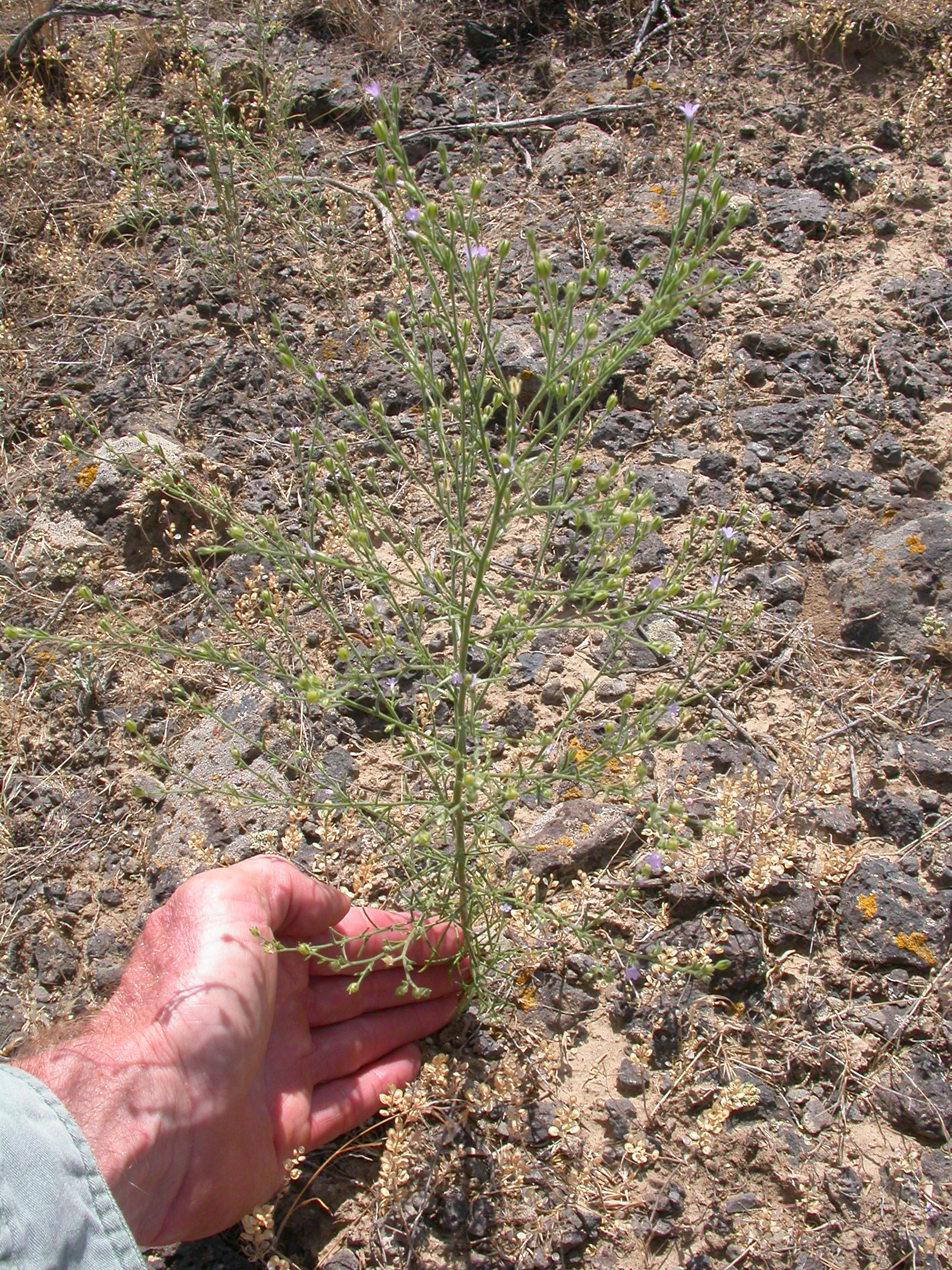

Conservation status
- Secure (NatureServe)

Scientific classification
- Kingdom: Plantae
- Clade: Embryophytes
- Clade: Tracheophytes
- Clade: Angiosperms
- Clade: Eudicots
- Clade: Asterids
- Order: Ericales
- Family: Polemoniaceae
- Genus: Gilia
- Species: G. inconspicua

Binomial name
- Gilia inconspicua (Sm.) Sweet

Synonyms
- Cantua parviflora; Gilia parviflora; Ipomeria inconspicua; Ipomopsis inconspicua; Navarretia inconspicua

= Gilia inconspicua =

Plant species in the phlox family

Gilia inconspicua is a species of flowering plant in the phlox family known by the common name shy gilia. It is native to the western United States, where it grows in sandy, open areas such as sagebrush and plateau.

This is a small herb with a spreading, branched stem reaching a maximum height of about 30 centimeters. The leaves are mainly basal and are divided into small smooth-edged or toothed leaflets. The leaves and lower stem may be strung with cobweb-like fibers.

The upper part of the stem around the inflorescence has a coat of black, hairlike gland fibers. Small flowers appear at the ends of the stem branches. Each is lavender with a yellowish throat.

== Taxonomy ==
In 1805 the botanist James Edward Smith named a new species in the genus Ipomopsis which he named Ipomopsis inconspicua. It was moved to the genus Gilia in 1826 by Robert Sweet, giving the species its accepted name of Gilia inconspicua. Together with its genus it is classified in the Polemoniaceae family. Although it has no accepted varieties, it has seven among its 13 botanical synonyms.

Table of Synonyms
Name	Year	Rank	Notes
Cantua parviflora Pursh	1813	species	= het.
Gilia inconspicua var. deserti Brand	1907	variety	= het.
Gilia inconspicua subsp. euinconspicua Brand	1907	subspecies	= het., not validly publ.
Gilia inconspicua var. lacerata A.Nelson	1938	variety	= het.
Gilia inconspicua var. milesii Brand	1907	variety	= het.
Gilia inconspicua var. ochroleuca Brand	1907	variety	= het.
Gilia inconspicua var. oreophila Brand	1907	variety	= het.
Gilia inconspicua var. subacaulis Brand	1907	variety	= het.
Gilia inconspicua var. variegata Brand	1907	variety	= het.
Gilia parviflora (Pursh) Spreng.	1824	species	= het.
Ipomeria inconspicua (Sm.) Nutt.	1818	species	≡ hom.
Ipomopsis inconspicua Sm.	1805	species	≡ hom.
Navarretia inconspicua (Sm.) Kuntze	1891	species	≡ hom.
Notes: ≡ homotypic synonym; = heterotypic synonym
