= August Brand =

German philologist and botanist (1863–1930)

August Brand (19 August 1863 – 17 September 1930) was a German philologist and botanist.

Brand was born in Berlin. He studied classical philology at Bonn and Berlin, obtaining his doctorate in 1885 with the thesis "De dialectis Aeolicis quae dicuntur". From 1885 to 1910 he taught classes in Frankfurt an der Oder, where he came under the influence of botanist Ernst Huth (1845–1897). From 1910 onward, he was an instructor at the gymnasium in Sorau. He died in Sorau, aged 67.

== Published works ==
He was the author of monographs on the plant families Symplocaceae, Polemoniaceae, Hydrophyllaceae and Boraginaceae that were included in Engler's "Das Pflanzenreich". He also made contributions towards Volume 3 in the new edition of Wilhelm Daniel Joseph Koch's "Synopsis der deutschen und schweizer Flora". Other noted works by Brand include:

- Monographie der Gattung Lotus, 1898 – Monograph on the genus Lotus.
- Beiträge zur Kenntnis der Hydrophyllaceen, 1911 – Contributions to the knowledge of Hydrophyllaceae.
- Die Hydrophyllaceen der Sierra Nevada, 1912 – Hydrophyllaceae of the Sierra Nevada.
