= Odoratus =

Odoratus is a Latin adjective meaning "fragrant, perfumed" (feminine form odorata, neuter form odoratum), and may refer to:

- Aerides odorata, a species of orchid
- Aglaia odorata, a species of plant in the family Meliaceae
- Anthoxanthum odoratum, known as sweet vernal grass, holy grass, or buffalo grass
- Ascalapha odorata bears the common name black witch
- Bulbophyllum odoratum, a species of orchid
- Cedrela odorata (Spanish cedar, Mexican cedar, cigar-box cedar, cedro-cheiroso)
- Chromolaena odorata, a shrub of the sunflower family native to North America
- Cyperus odoratus, a species of sedge known by the common names fragrant flatsedge and rusty flatsedge
- Eucalyptus odorata, a small to medium-sized tree native to south eastern Australia
- Galium odoratum (woodruff, wild baby's breath), a flowering perennial plant in the family Rubiaceae, native to Europe, North Africa and western Asia
- Henriettella odorata, a species of plant in the family Melastomataceae
- Hopea odorata, a species of plant in the family Dipterocarpaceae
- Hymenoxys odorata, a species of flowering plant in the daisy family known as bitter rubberweed and western bitterweed
- Lupinus odoratus, is a spring wildflower found in the central and western Mojave Desert in the southwestern United States
- Mallotus odoratus, synonym of Mallotus peltatus, a species of plant in the family Euphorbiaceae
- Mangifera odorata (also called Kuwini mango, Saipan mango, or fragrant mango) is a species of plant in the family Anacardiaceae
- Morrenia odorata (latexplant, strangler vine) is an ornamental plant in the family Apocynaceae, which is native to Brazil
- Nymphaea odorata, a flower also known as the fragrant water lily and beaver root
- Nymphaea odorata subsp. odorata, a subspecies of Nymphaea odorata found in the United States
- Nymphaea odorata subsp. tuberosa, a subspecies of Nymphaea odorata found in the eastern United States
- Odoratus, an extinct genus of brachiopod
- Oenothera odorata, a perennial plant in the family Onagraceae native to South America
- Oncidium odoratum, a species of orchid
- Persicaria odorata, also known as Vietnamese coriander, an herb used in Southeast Asian cuisine
- Polygonatum odoratum, a species of plant commonly known as angular Solomon's-seal or scented Solomon's-seal
- Prunus odorata, synonym of Prunus mahaleb subsp. mahaleb, a subspecies of plant in the family Rosaceae
- Psydrax odorata, also known as alaheʻe in Hawaiian, a flowering shrub in the family Rubiaceae
- Rondeletia odorata (the fragrant Panama rose) is originally from Panama and Cuba
- Rubus odoratus (purple-flowering raspberry, flowering raspberry, or Virginia raspberry) is a species of Rubus, native to eastern North America
- Sternotherus odoratus or stinkpot is a species of small turtle native to southeastern Canada and much of the eastern United States
- Tephrosia odorata, a species of legume in the family Fabaceae
- Utricularia odorata, a medium-sized, probably perennial carnivorous plant in the family Lentibulariaceae
- Vatica odorata, a tree in the family Dipterocarpaceae
- Viola odorata, a violet in the family Violaceae
