= Mojave lupine =

Mojave lupine is a common name for several lupines and it may refer to:

- Lupinus odoratus
- Lupinus sparsiflorus
