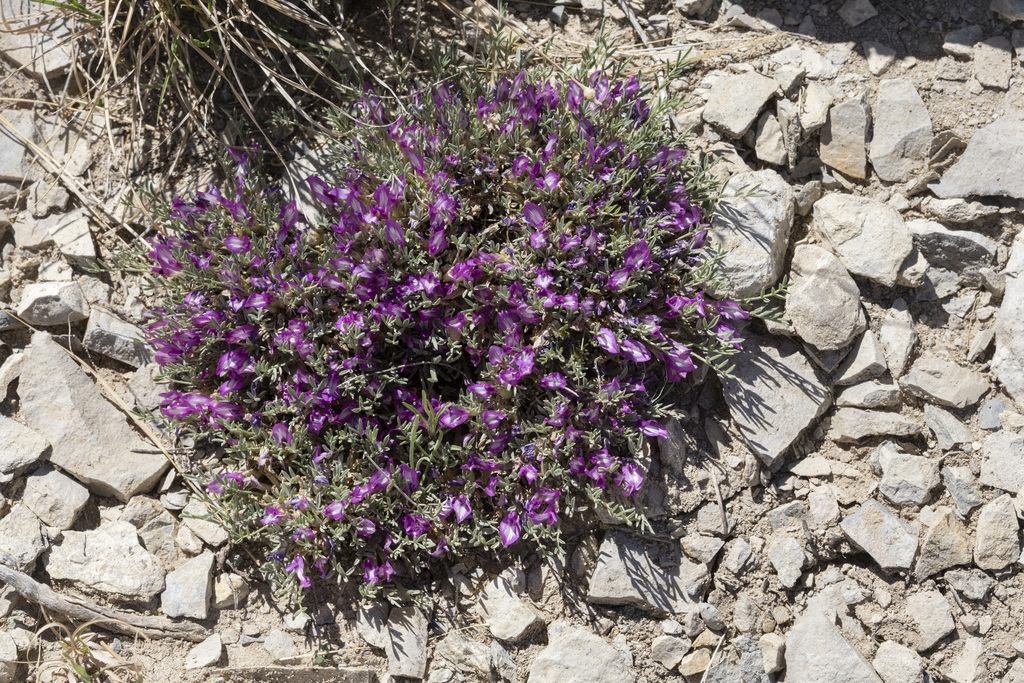

Conservation status
- Imperiled (NatureServe)

Scientific classification
- Kingdom: Plantae
- Clade: Embryophytes
- Clade: Tracheophytes
- Clade: Spermatophytes
- Clade: Angiosperms
- Clade: Eudicots
- Clade: Rosids
- Order: Fabales
- Family: Fabaceae
- Subfamily: Faboideae
- Genus: Astragalus
- Species: A. wittmannii

Binomial name
- Astragalus wittmannii Barneby

= Astragalus wittmannii =

Species of flowering plant

Astragalus wittmannii, commonly known as Wittmann's milkvetch, is a species of flowering plant in the family Fabaceae. It is native to grasslands in New Mexico.

Astragalus wittmannii is a small perennial herb with purple petals. It was described in 1979, and is classified as Imperiled by NatureServe.

== Taxonomy ==
The species was described by Rupert Charles Barneby in 1979. The description represented the new section Nothorophaca.

== Distribution ==
Astragalus wittmannii is endemic to New Mexico, United States. Its range is around 1,350 square kilometres (520 sq mi), and includes Colfax County, Harding County, and Mora County. It grows on the western part of Kiowa National Grassland.

The species occurs in the temperate biome. It grows on limestone, and in grasslands, at elevations of 1,800–2,000 metres (5,900–6,600 ft). It is associated with Castilleja sessiliflora, Zinnia grandiflora, Artemisia bigelovii, Tetraneuris scaposa, and Dalea purpurea.

== Description ==
Astragalus wittmannii is a small perennial herb. It has a woody taproot, and forms a cushion of foliage up to 30 centimetres (0.98 ft) in diameter. The foliage has small, stiff, hairs.

The calyx is 8–10 millimetres (0.31–0.39 in) in size, and the petals are purple. The seeds are kidney-shaped. The seed coat is smooth, brown, and has purple specks.

== Conservation ==
NatureServe classifies Astragalus wittmannii as Imperiled. It is threatened by mining of its limestone habitat. It is also threatened by urban development, and climate change. The species is not affected by livestock grazing.
