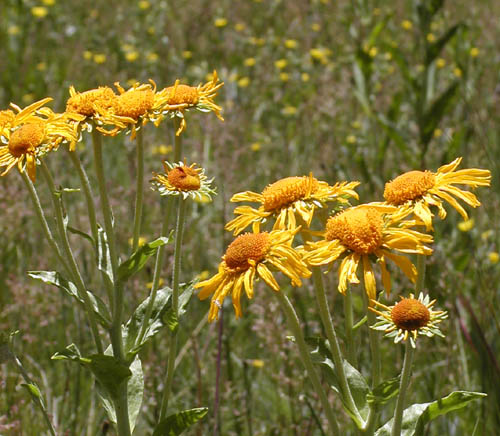
- Hymenoxys hoopesii

Scientific classification
- Kingdom: Plantae
- Clade: Tracheophytes
- Clade: Angiosperms
- Clade: Eudicots
- Clade: Asterids
- Order: Asterales
- Family: Asteraceae
- Subfamily: Asteroideae
- Tribe: Helenieae
- Subtribe: Tetraneurinae
- Genus: Hymenoxys; Cass.

Type species
- Hymenoxys anthemoides (Juss.) Cass.

Synonyms
- Plummera A.Gray; Dugaldia Cass.; Actinella Juss. ex Nutt.; Phileozera Buckley; Macdougalia A.Heller

= Hymenoxys =

Genus of flowering plants

Hymenoxys (rubberweed or bitterweed) is a genus of plants in the sunflower family, native to North and South America. It was named by Alexandre Henri Gabriel de Cassini in 1828.

Plants of this genus are toxic to sheep due to the presence of the sesquiterpene lactone hymenoxon.

Species

- Hymenoxys ambigens - Pinaleno Mountain rubberweed - Arizona New Mexico
- Hymenoxys anthemoides - Rio Grande do Sul, Rio de Janeiro, Paraguay, Uruguay, Argentina
- Hymenoxys biennis - Utah
- Hymenoxys bigelovii - Utah Arizona New Mexico
- Hymenoxys brachyactis - East View rubberweed - New Mexico
- Hymenoxys brandegeei - Arizona New Mexico Colorado
- Hymenoxys cabrerae - Argentina
- Hymenoxys californica - California, Baja California
- Hymenoxys chrysanthemoides - San Luis Potosí, Veracruz, Zacatecas, México State, Puebla, Oaxaca, Hidalgo
- Hymenoxys cooperi - Cooper's rubberweed - California Nevada Arizona Utah Idaho Oregon New Mexico
- Hymenoxys grandiflora - New Mexico Colorado Wyoming Montana Utah Idaho
- Hymenoxys helenioides - intermountain rubberweed - Arizona New Mexico Colorado Utah
- Hymenoxys hoopesii - owl claws - New Mexico Colorado Wyoming Montana Utah Idaho Oregon Nevada California
- Hymenoxys insignis - Nuevo León, Coahuila, Chihuahua
- Hymenoxys jamesii - Arizona
- Hymenoxys lemmonii - Lemmon's rubberweed - Arizona Oregon Nevada California
- Hymenoxys multiflora - Texas New Mexico
- Hymenoxys mutica - California
- Hymenoxys odorata - bitter rubberweed - California Arizona New Mexico Texas Oklahoma Colorado Kansas Maine South Carolina Alabama, Baja California, Baja California Sur, Sonora, Chihuahua, Coahuila, Durango, Nuevo León, San Luis Potosí, Tamaulipas
- Hymenoxys quinquesquamata - rincon rubberweed - Arizona New Mexico
- Hymenoxys richardsonii - pingue rubberweed, Colorado rubberweed - Alberta, Saskatchewan, Montana Idaho Wyoming Utah Colorado New Mexico Arizona Texas Nebraska North Dakota Nevada
- Hymenoxys robusta - Bolivia, Argentina, Peru
- Hymenoxys rusbyi - Arizona New Mexico
- Hymenoxys subintegra - Arizona rubberweed - Arizona Utah
- Hymenoxys texana - prairie dawn - Texas
- Hymenoxys tweediei - Argentina
- Hymenoxys vaseyi - Texas New Mexico

formerly included

- Hymenoxys acaulis is now called Tetraneuris acaulis
- Hymenoxys argentea now Tetraneuris argentea
- Hymenoxys depressa now Tetraneuris torreyana
- Hymenoxys glabra now Tetraneuris scaposa
- Hymenoxys herbacea now Tetraneuris herbacea
- Hymenoxys integrifolia now Helenium integrifolium
- Hymenoxys ivesiana now Tetraneuris ivesiana
- Hymenoxys lapidicola now Tetraneuris torreyana
- Hymenoxys linearifolia now Tetraneuris linearifolia
- Hymenoxys scaposa now Tetraneuris scaposa
- Hymenoxys torreyana now Tetraneuris torreyana
- Hymenoxys turneri now Tetraneuris turneri
