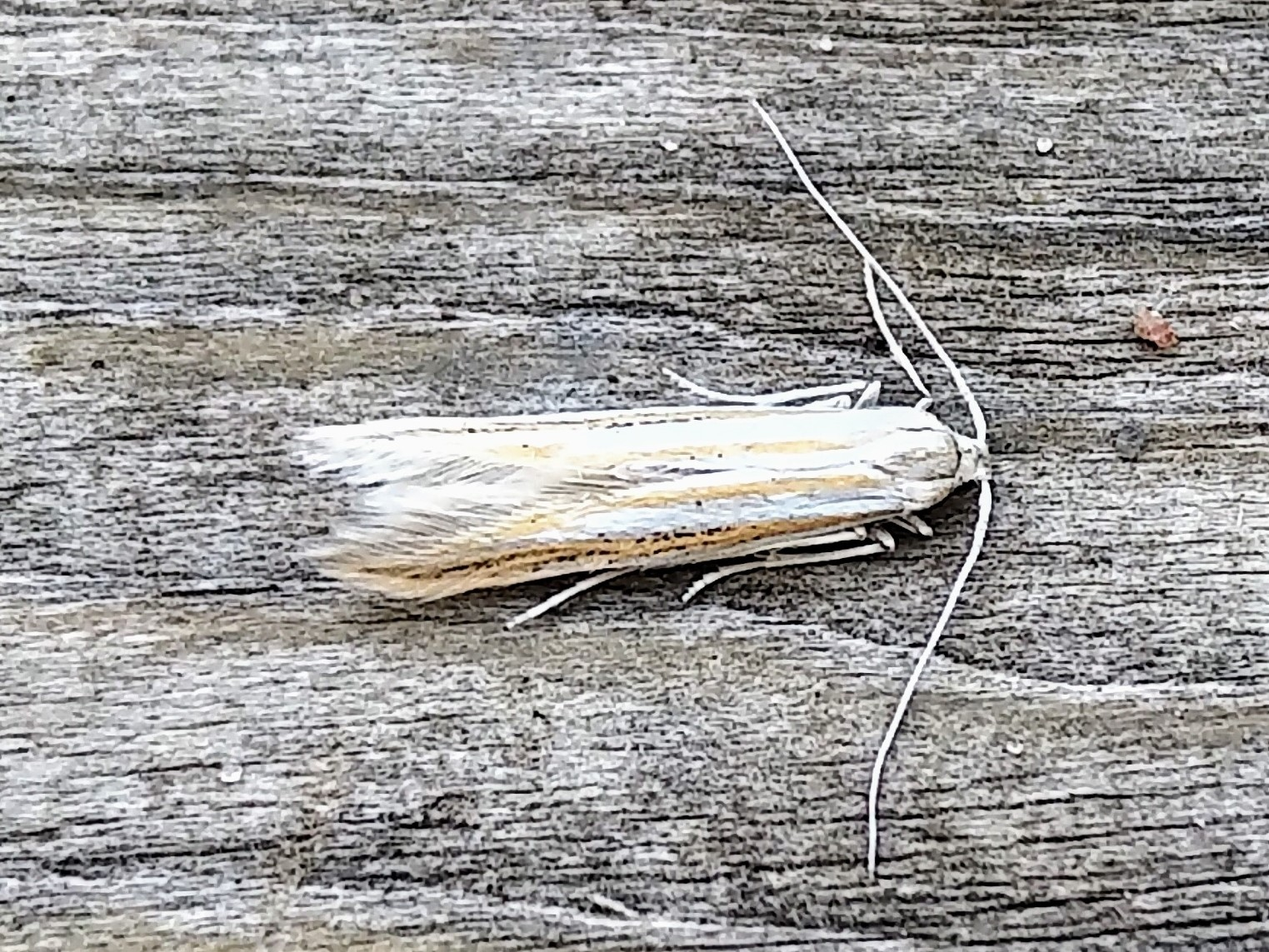

Scientific classification
- Kingdom: Animalia
- Phylum: Arthropoda
- Clade: Pancrustacea
- Class: Insecta
- Order: Lepidoptera
- Family: Coleophoridae
- Genus: Coleophora
- Species: C. bistrigella

Binomial name
- Coleophora bistrigella Chambers, 1875

= Coleophora bistrigella =

Species of moth

Coleophora bistrigella is a species of moth in the family Coleophoridae. It is found in the United States, including Colorado and Texas.

The larvae feed on the leaves of Hymenoxys species. They create a trivalved, tubular silken case.
