= Thaddäus Haenke =

Czech botanist and explorer

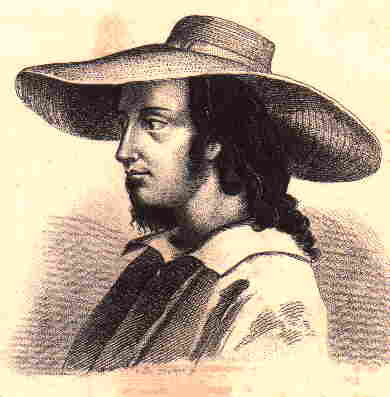
Haenke by Vincenz Raimund Grüner

Thaddäus Xaverius Peregrinus Haenke (also Thaddeus Haenke; Czech: Tadeáš Haenke; Spanish: Tadeo Haenke; 5 October 1761 – 4 November 1816) was a Czech botanist and explorer. He participated in the Malaspina Expedition, exploring a significant portion of the Pacific basin including the coasts of North and South America, Australia, the Philippines, New Zealand, and the Marianas. His collections of botanical specimens were the basis for the initial scientific descriptions of many plants in these regions, particularly South America and the Philippines. His extensive botanical work and far-ranging travel have prompted some to liken him to a "Bohemian Humboldt", named after Alexander von Humboldt, who made himself familiar with some of Haenke's findings before embarking on his journey to the Americas in 1799.

== Biography ==
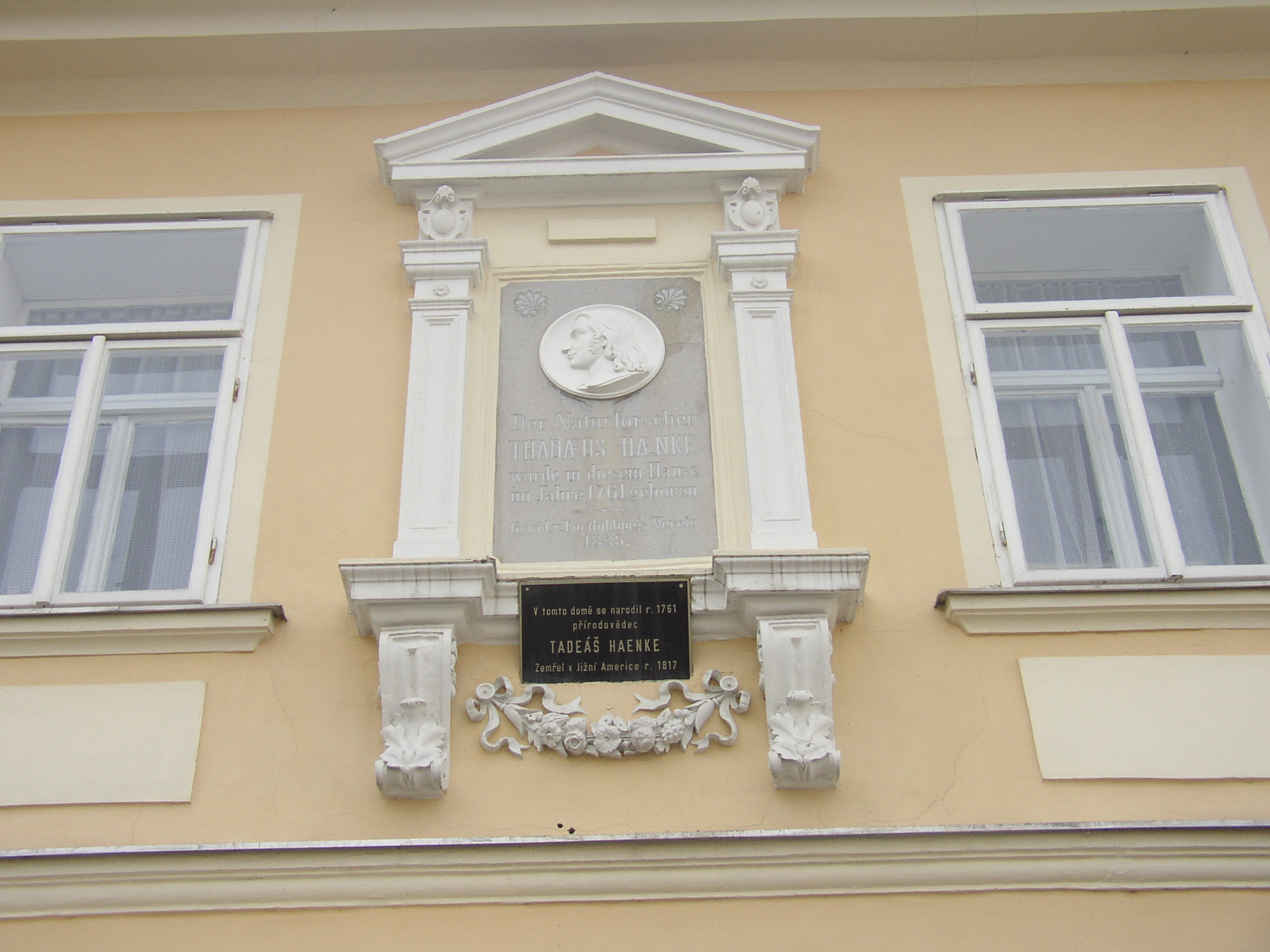
Memorial plaque of 1885 at his birthplace, in German, with plaque in Czech added in the 1960s

Haenke was born 5 October 1761 in the village of Kreibitz, Kingdom of Bohemia (now Chřibská, Czech Republic). His parents were German Bohemians and his father, Elias George Thomas Haenke, was a successful lawyer and farmer who also served as mayor. A keen observer of nature from childhood, Haenke pursued this interest throughout his education. He studied natural science and philosophy at the University of Prague where his mentor was Joseph Gottfried Mikan, the resident professor of botany. He served as an assistant to Mikan, helping care for the school's botanic gardens. Haenke received a doctorate in 1782, continued to study in Prague until 1786 and then became a student at the University of Vienna where he studied medicine and botany under Nikolaus Joseph von Jacquin.

While still a student, Haenke made extensive botanical collections from what is now the Czech Republic; wrote a treatise on the botany of the Giant Mountains; edited an edition of Linnaeus' Genera Plantarum (published in 1791); and was awarded a silver medal from the Royal Czech Scientific Society. He was also an accomplished musician, a capable illustrator, and spoke five languages.

== Malaspina expedition ==
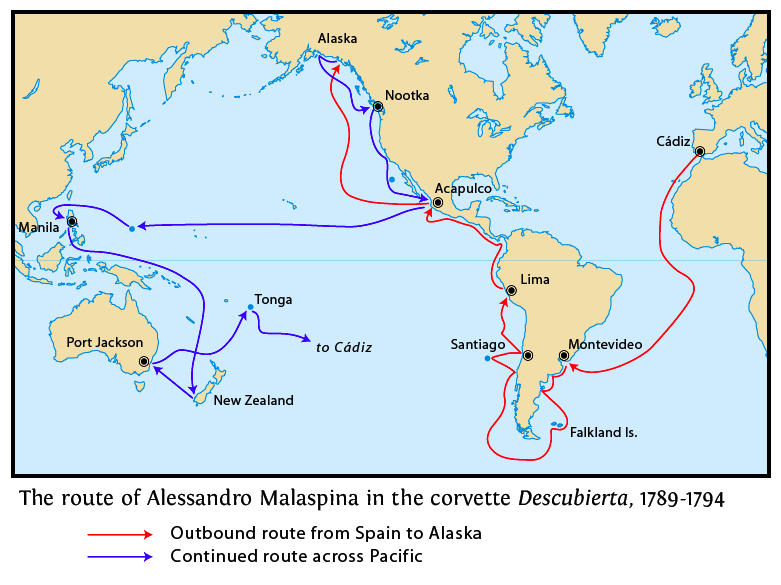
Map showing the route of Malaspina's ship Descubierta with the return to Spain from Tonga omitted. The route of Bustamante's Atrevida was mostly the same, but deviated in some places.

By 1789 Haenke was a prominent young scholar whose name was put forward by Jacquin and Ignaz von Born when Spain was recruiting a scientific corps for the Malaspina expedition. Emperor Joseph II had met Haenke before and he approved the appointment. Thus Haenke became "Naturalist-Botánico de Su Magestad" for the expedition. A long, roundabout journey from Vienna brought Haenke to Cádiz on 30 July 1789, just hours after the two ships of the expedition, the Descubierta and Atrevida, had set sail.

Determined not to miss this opportunity, he took passage on another ship, intending to catch up with the expedition in Montevideo. This vessel was shipwrecked near his destination and Haenke was forced to swim for the shore, salvaging only his collecting equipment and his copy of Genera Plantarum. Again, he had just missed the expedition. After recuperating in Buenos Aires, he hired guides for a trek overland across the pampas and Andes, hoping to catch the expedition at Valparaiso. Along the way, Haenke managed to collect about 1400 plants, many of them new to science. Although his botanical work must have slowed them down, he managed to reach the coast in time to join Malaspina in April 1790.

From there Haenke continued with the expedition for the next three years, collecting plants and recording his observations on botany, zoology, geology, and ethnology. They initially traveled up the west coast of the Americas as far as Alaska, then returned south to Acapulco and crossed the Pacific to explore the Philippines, Australia, and New Zealand. At each port of call Haenke focused on botany with varying results. In Yakutat Bay, Alaska the plants he collected were disappointingly similar to those in Europe so he focused instead on Indian culture, especially music. In Nootka Sound he made the first scientific collection of plants from Canada. Their brief stay in California enabled Haenke to collect and catalog over 250 species, most notably he was the first scientist to collect the seeds and specimens of the coast redwood.

After crossing the Pacific, Haenke collected thousands of plants during their seven-month stay in the Philippines. Further collecting took place in Australia, New Zealand, and Tonga. In the summer of 1793 the expedition returned to Peru where Malaspina received orders to return home by way of Montevideo. Haenke was permitted to leave the ship with an assistant and cross overland to Buenos Aires with the intention of undertaking botanical and other scientific work along the way. Instead of rejoining the fleet again in the fall of 1794 as planned, Haenke became engrossed with the local botany and settled in Cochabamba, Bolivia to continue his scientific studies.

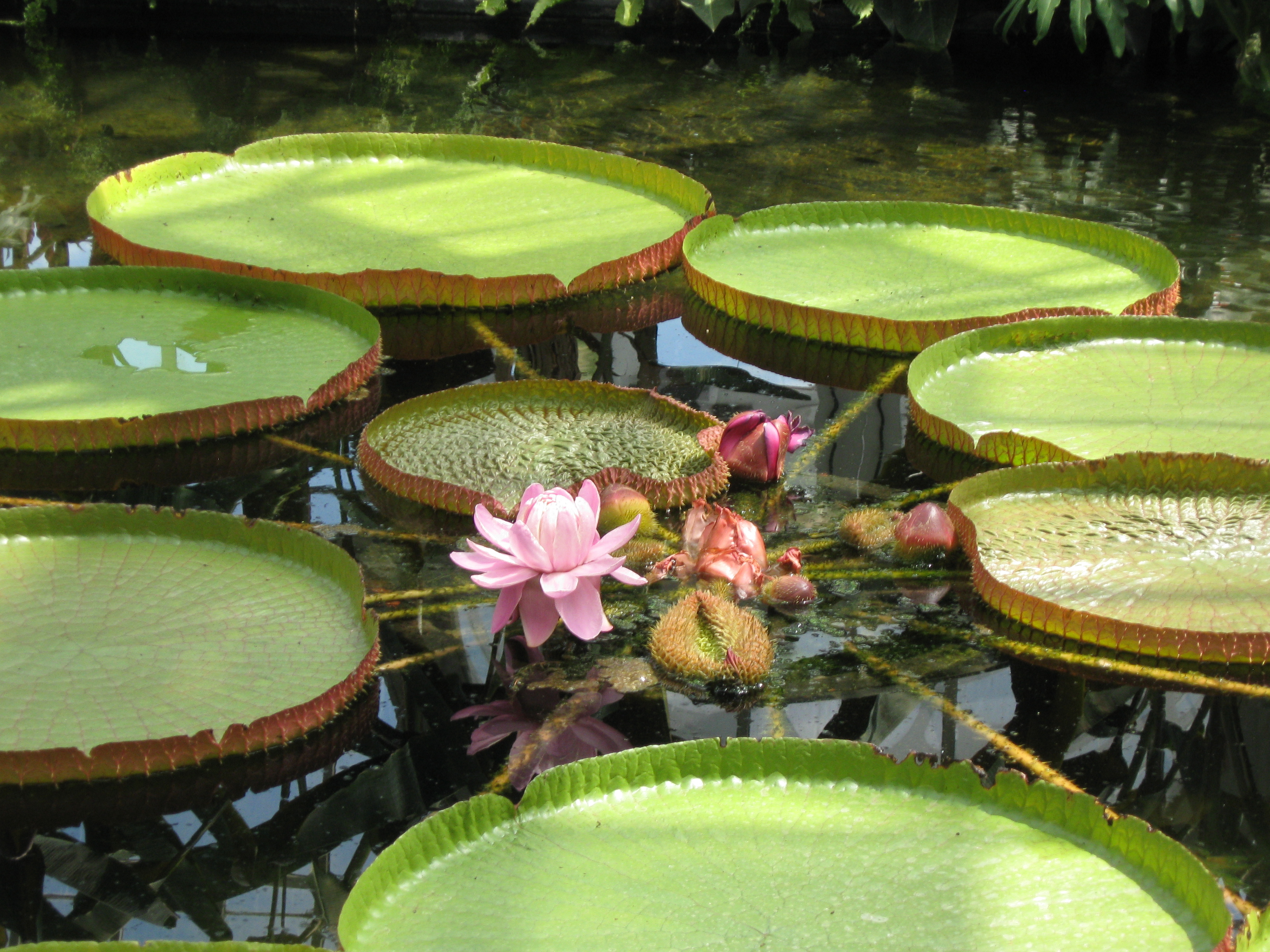
Victoria amazonica, first identified by Haenke in 1801

For the next quarter-century, Haenke continued his botanical exploration of Bolivia, Peru and Brazil. In 1801 he made one of his most memorable discoveries, the giant water lily, Victoria amazonica, with a six-foot wide lily pad. In addition, Haenke maintained his own botanic garden, owned a silver mine and served as the local physician in his adopted home town, Cochabamba. He is also credited with establishing the manufacture of saltpeter in Chile and helping to start the glass industry there.

Although he had always hoped to return to Europe, Haenke died unexpectedly in 1816 when he was accidentally poisoned by his maid.

== Legacy ==
When Malaspina returned from his voyage he became embroiled in a dispute with Spain's minister, Manuel de Godoy, and was subsequently imprisoned for seven years. As a result, the official expedition report went unpublished for nearly a century, and many of the expedition's reports and findings were never released.

Haenke's botanical collections consisting of more than 15,000 specimens were found in Cádiz after his death. They were bought in 1821 by the Czech National Museum and transferred to Prague. The Czech botanist Carl Borivoj Presl spent nearly 15 years producing the "Reliquiae Haenkeanae" (published from 1825 to 1835), a work based on Haenke's botanical specimens collected in the Americas and the Philippines and purchased in Cádiz. The work was produced together with an exsiccata series Six volumes were produced but ultimately the work remained unfinished due to a lack of funds.

- Presl, Carl Borivoj. Reliquiae Haenkeanae: seu descriptiones et icones plantarum, quas in America meridionali et boreali, in insulis Philippinis et Marianis collegit Thaddaeus Haenke. J.G. Calve, Prague, 1830.
- Presl, Carl Borivoj. Reliquiae Haenkeanae volume I

Haenke Island and Haenke Glacier in Alaska are named in his honour. A small private museum, "Muzeum Tadeáše Haenkeho", was established at Haenke's birth home in Chřibská, Czech Republic.

Around 240 taxa carry his name, including:

- Alpinia haenkei C.Presl
- Berberis haenkeana Presl ex Schult. f.
- Bromus haenkeanus (J.Presl) Kunth,
- Carex haenkeana C.Presl
- Ceratochloa haenkeana J.Presl
- Hymenoxys haenkeana DC.
- Leptosolena haenkei C.Presl
- Lobelia haenkeana A.DC.
- Loranthus haenkeanus Presl ex Schult.f.
- Mascagnia haenkeana W.R.Anderson
- Pseudogynoxys haenkei (DC.) Cabrera
- Pteris haenkeana C.Presl
- Salvia haenkei Benth.
- Schinopsis haenkeana Engl.
- Waltheria haenkeana D.Dietr.

== See also ==
- European and American voyages of scientific exploration
