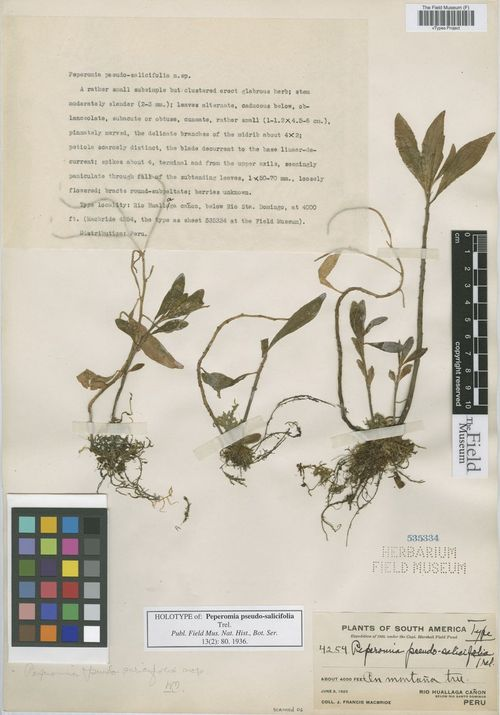

Scientific classification
- Kingdom: Plantae
- Clade: Tracheophytes
- Clade: Angiosperms
- Clade: Magnoliids
- Order: Piperales
- Family: Piperaceae
- Genus: Peperomia
- Species: P. pseudosalicifolia

Binomial name
- Peperomia pseudosalicifolia Trel.

= Peperomia pseudosalicifolia =

Species of plant

Peperomia pseudosalicifolia is a species of terrestrial or epiphytic herb in the genus Peperomia that is native to Peru. It grows on wet tropical biomes. Its conservation status is threatened.

== Description ==
The type specimen were collected at Huánuco, Peru.

Peperomia pseudosalicifolia is a somewhat small, nearly simple, tufted, erect, glabrous herb with a moderately slender stem 2–3 mm thick. The alternate leaves are oblanceolate, somewhat acute to obtuse, with a cuneate base, measuring 4.5–6 cm long and 1–1.2 cm wide. They are pinnately nerved with about 4 pairs of delicate branches from the midrib, and are essentially sessile with the blade decurrent onto the stem, forming a linear-decurrent wing. The spikes, about 4 in number, are terminal and from the upper axils, appearing falsely paniculate due to the absence of subtending leaves. They are 50–70 mm long and 1 mm thick, with loosely arranged flowers.

== Taxonomy and naming ==
It was described in 1936 by William Trelease in Publications of the Field Museum of Natural History, Botanical Series 13, from specimens collected by Thaddäus Haenke.

The epithet combines the Greek pseudo- and Salix with folia, meaning "false willow-leaved," referring to the resemblance of its narrow, lanceolate leaves to those of a willow.

== Distribution and habitat ==
It is native to Peru. It grows as a terrestrial or epiphytic herb. It grows on wet tropical biomes.

== Conservation ==
This species has been assessed as threatened in a preliminary report.
