= Hymenoxys helenioides =

Conservation status
- Vulnerable (NatureServe)

Scientific classification
- Kingdom: Plantae
- Clade: Tracheophytes
- Clade: Angiosperms
- Clade: Eudicots
- Clade: Asterids
- Order: Asterales
- Family: Asteraceae
- Genus: Hymenoxys
- Species: H. helenioides

Binomial name
- Hymenoxys helenioides Cockerell

Synonyms
- Actinea helenioides; Dugaldia helenioides; Picradenia helenioides

Plant species in the daisy family

Hymenoxys helenioides is a North American species of flowering plant in the daisy family known by the common name intermountain rubberweed. It is native to Arizona, Utah, Colorado, and New Mexico in the western United States.

Hymenoxys helenioides is a perennial herb up to 50 cm (20 in) tall. One plant generally produces as many as 50 flower heads. Each head has 10–16 ray flowers and 50–150 disc flowers.

== Taxonomy ==
In 1904 Hymenoxys helenioides was scientifically described and named by Theodore D. A. Cockerell. It is classified in the genus Hymenoxys within the family Asteraceae. It has no subspecies and has three heterotypic synonyms.

Table of Synonyms
Name	Year
Actinea helenioides S.F.Blake	1931
Dugaldia helenioides A.Nelson	1909
Picradenia helenioides Rydb.	1901

== Range ==
According to Plants of the World Online, intermountain rubberweed is native to just three western states; Colorado, Utah, and Arizona. However, according to the Natural Resources Conservation Service it also grows in San Juan County, New Mexico and Clark County, Nevada, though nowhere else in these states. The NRCS also records it in just Apache County, Arizona.
