= Henriettea goudotiana =

Conservation status
- Least Concern (IUCN 3.1)

Scientific classification
- Kingdom: Plantae
- Clade: Tracheophytes
- Clade: Angiosperms
- Clade: Eudicots
- Clade: Rosids
- Order: Myrtales
- Family: Melastomataceae
- Genus: Henriettea
- Species: H. goudotiana

Binomial name
- Henriettea goudotiana (Naudin) Penneys, Michelang., Judd & Almeda

Synonyms
- Henriettella goudotiana Naudin

Species of flowering plant

Henriettea goudotiana is a species of plant in the family Melastomataceae. It is endemic to Colombia.
