= Henriettea membranifolia =

Conservation status
- Critically Endangered (IUCN 2.3)

Scientific classification
- Kingdom: Plantae
- Clade: Tracheophytes
- Clade: Angiosperms
- Clade: Eudicots
- Clade: Rosids
- Order: Myrtales
- Family: Melastomataceae
- Genus: Henriettea
- Species: H. membranifolia

Binomial name
- Henriettea membranifolia (Cogn.) Alain

Synonyms
- Henriettella membranifolia Cogn.

Species of plant

Henriettea membranifolia, the thinleaf camasey, is a species of plant in the family Melastomataceae. It is endemic to Puerto Rico.
