= Hymenoxys cabrerae =

Scientific classification
- Kingdom: Plantae
- Clade: Tracheophytes
- Clade: Angiosperms
- Clade: Eudicots
- Clade: Asterids
- Order: Asterales
- Family: Asteraceae
- Genus: Hymenoxys
- Species: H. cabrerae

Binomial name
- Hymenoxys cabrerae K.F.Parker 1962

Species of flowering plant

Hymenoxys cabrerae is a South American species of flowering plant in the daisy family. It has only been found in Argentina

Hymenoxys cabrerae is a succulent annual up to 50 cm (20 in) tall. Leaves are divided in thin, narrow segments. Flower heads each contain 115–200 disc flowers but no ray flowers.
