= Hymenoxys rusbyi =

Scientific classification
- Kingdom: Plantae
- Clade: Tracheophytes
- Clade: Angiosperms
- Clade: Eudicots
- Clade: Asterids
- Order: Asterales
- Family: Asteraceae
- Genus: Hymenoxys
- Species: H. rusbyi

Binomial name
- Hymenoxys rusbyi (A.Gray) Cockerell 1904

Synonyms
- Actinella rusbyi A.Gray 1883; Picradenia rusbyi (A.Gray) Greene

Species of flowering plant

Hymenoxys rusbyi is a North American species of flowering plant in the daisy family known by the common names Rusby's rubberweed or Rusby's bitterweed. It has been found only in the states of Arizona and New Mexico in the southwestern United States.

Hymenoxys rusbyi grows in open areas, generally at the edges of pine-oak forests at elevations of 1,500–2,500 meters (4,900–8,200 ft). It is a perennial herb up to 150 cm (4.9 ft) tall. One plant can produce sometimes as many as 250 flower heads in a branching, flat-topped array. Each head has 6–8 yellow ray flowers and 25–50 tiny yellow disc flowers.
