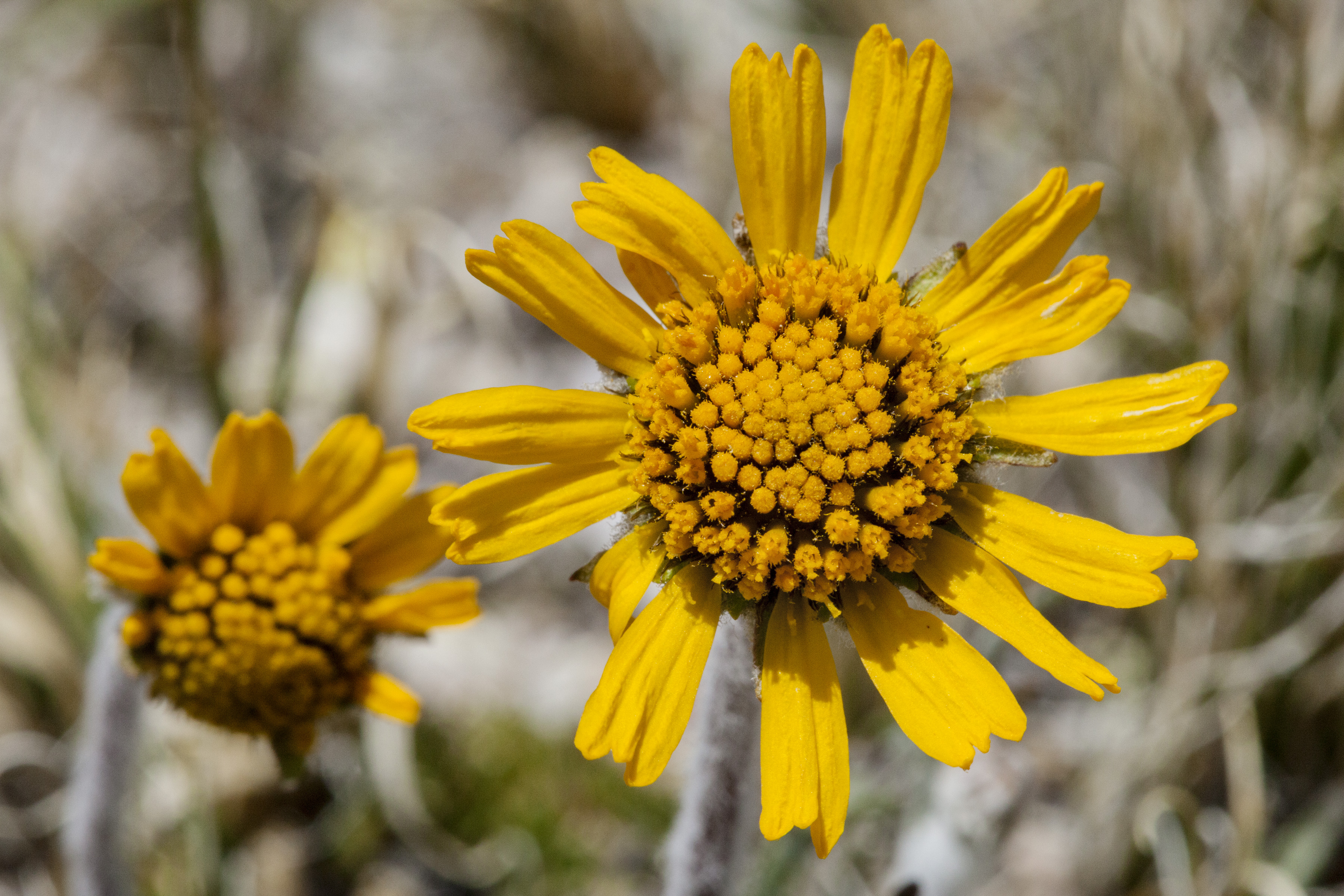

Conservation status
- Secure (NatureServe)

Scientific classification
- Kingdom: Plantae
- Clade: Tracheophytes
- Clade: Angiosperms
- Clade: Eudicots
- Clade: Asterids
- Order: Asterales
- Family: Asteraceae
- Genus: Hymenoxys
- Species: H. brandegeei

Binomial name
- Hymenoxys brandegeei (Porter ex A.Gray) K.F.Parker 1950

Synonyms
- Synonymy: Hymenoxys brandegei; Actinea brandegeei (Porter ex A.Gray) Kuntze; Actinea brandegei (Porter ex A.Gray) Kuntze; Actinella brandegeei Porter ex A.Gray; Actinella brandegei Porter ex A.Gray; Actinella grandiflora var. glabrata Porter 1874; Rydbergia brandegei (Porter ex A.Gray) Rydb.; Rydbergia brandegeei (Porter ex A.Gray) Rydb.; Rydbergia glabrata (Porter) Greene; Tetraneuris brandegeei (Porter ex A.Gray) K.F.Parker; Tetraneuris brandegei (Porter ex A.Gray) K.F.Parker

= Hymenoxys brandegeei =

Species of flowering plant

Hymenoxys brandegeei is a species of flowering plant in the daisy family known by the common names Brandegee's four-nerve daisy, Brandegee's rubberweed or western bitterweed. It is native to the states of Arizona, Colorado, and New Mexico in the southwestern United States.

Hymenoxys brandegeei grows at elevations of 2,800–4,100 meters (9,200–13,500 ft) in the mountains, often above timber line. It is a perennial herb up to 24 cm (9.4 in) tall. One plant generally produces one flower head per stem, up to 10 per plant. Each head has 14–23ray flowers and 150–250 disc flowers.

The oldest available name for this plant is Actinella grandiflora var. glabrata, coined in 1874. In elevating the taxon to species status, Asa Gray opted to forgo the common but not mandatory custom of using the varietal epithet as a species epithet. He chose instead to call the species Actinella brandegei.
