= Henriettea ramiflora =

Conservation status
- Least Concern (IUCN 3.1)

Scientific classification
- Kingdom: Plantae
- Clade: Tracheophytes
- Clade: Angiosperms
- Clade: Eudicots
- Clade: Rosids
- Order: Myrtales
- Family: Melastomataceae
- Genus: Henriettea
- Species: H. ramiflora

Binomial name
- Henriettea ramiflora (Sw.) DC. (1828)

Synonyms
- Henriettea granularis (Urb.) Alain (1965); Henriettea succosa var. guianensis Gleason (1940); Henriettea surinamensis Miq. (1851); Henriettea trinervia Naudin (1852), nom. superfl.; Henriettella granularis Urb. (1926); Henriettella ramiflora (Sw.) Naudin (1852); Melastoma ramiflorum Sw. (1788) (basionym)

Species of flowering plant

Henriettea ramiflora is a species of flowering plant in the family Melastomataceae. It is a tree native to the tropical Americas, including Cuba, Nicaragua, Jamaica, Colombia, Venezuela, Trinidad and Tobago, the Guianas, and northern, northeastern, and central Brazil.
