= Hymenoxys jamesii =

Scientific classification
- Kingdom: Plantae
- Clade: Tracheophytes
- Clade: Angiosperms
- Clade: Eudicots
- Clade: Asterids
- Order: Asterales
- Family: Asteraceae
- Genus: Hymenoxys
- Species: H. jamesii

Binomial name
- Hymenoxys jamesii Bierner 1993

Species of flowering plant

Hymenoxys jamesii is a North American species of flowering plant in the daisy family known by the common name James's rubberweed. It has been found only on the Mogollon Plateau of Arizona in the southwestern United States.

Hymenoxys jamesii is a perennial herb up to 120 cm (4 feet) tall. One plant can produce sometimes as many as 330 flower heads in a branching array. Each head has 7–9 ray flowers and 30–75 tiny disc flowers.
