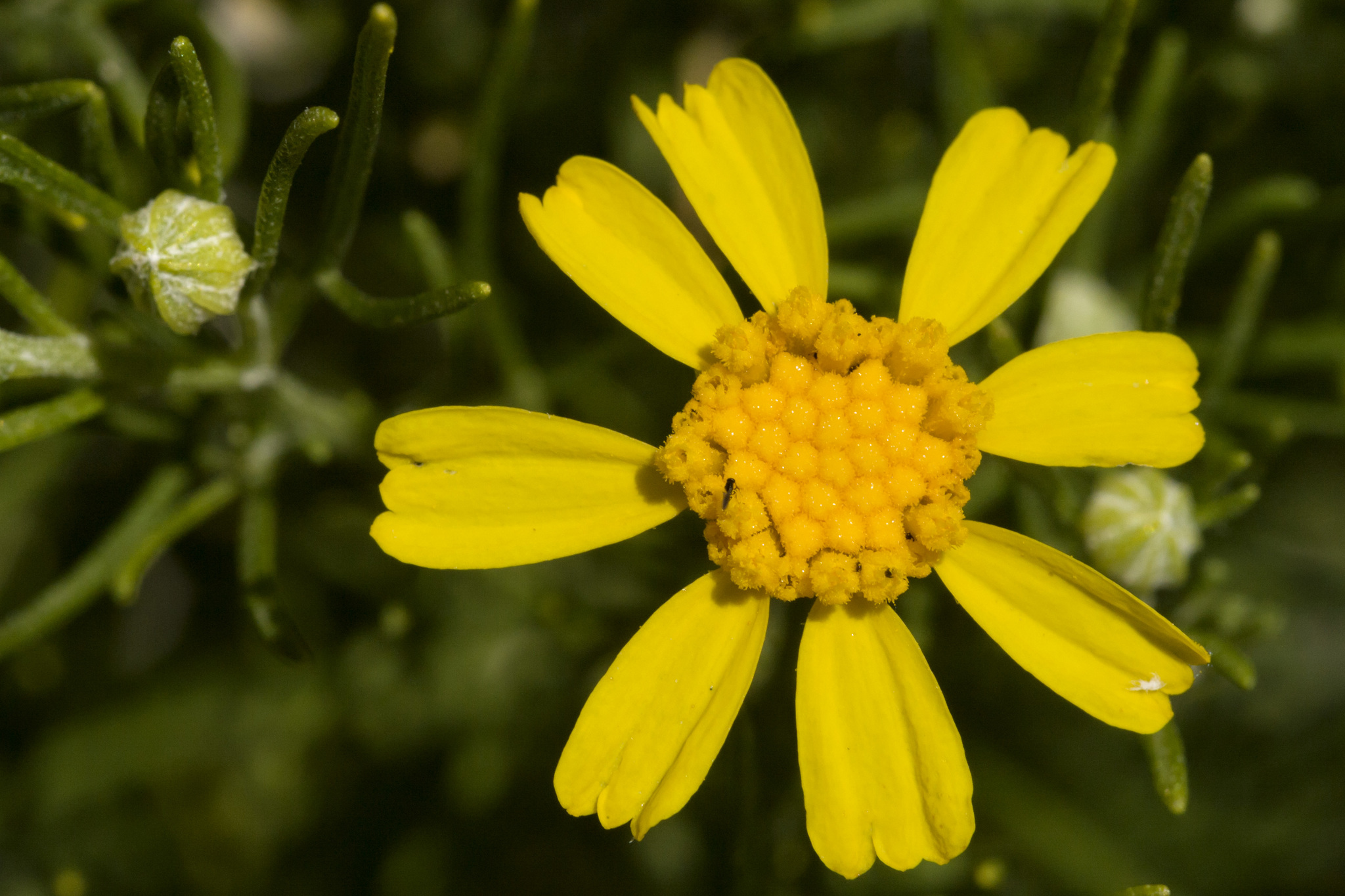

Scientific classification
- Kingdom: Plantae
- Clade: Tracheophytes
- Clade: Angiosperms
- Clade: Eudicots
- Clade: Asterids
- Order: Asterales
- Family: Asteraceae
- Genus: Hymenoxys
- Species: H. brachyactis

Binomial name
- Hymenoxys brachyactis Wooton & Standl. 1913

= Hymenoxys brachyactis =

Species of flowering plant

Hymenoxys brachyactis is a species of flowering plant in the daisy family known by the common names east view rubberweed and tall bitterweed. It is native to the state of New Mexico in the southwestern United States.

Hymenoxys brachyactis grows at elevations of 2,000–2,500 meters (6,600–8,200 ft) in open areas or the edges of pine forests. It is a biennial or perennial herb up to 60 cm (2.0 ft) tall. One plant can produce an array with as many as 250 small yellow flower heads, each head with 8-9 ray flowers and 25–60 disc flowers.
