= Hymenoxys bigelovii =

Scientific classification
- Kingdom: Plantae
- Clade: Tracheophytes
- Clade: Angiosperms
- Clade: Eudicots
- Clade: Asterids
- Order: Asterales
- Family: Asteraceae
- Genus: Hymenoxys
- Species: H. bigelovii

Binomial name
- Hymenoxys bigelovii (A.Gray) K.F.Parker 1950

Synonyms
- Actinella bigelovii A. Gray 1853; Actinea bigelovii (A. Gray) A. Nelson; Macdougalia bigelovii (A. Gray) A. Heller

Species of flowering plant

Hymenoxys bigelovii is a species of flowering plant in the daisy family known by the common name Bigelow's rubberweed . It is native to the states of Arizona, Utah, and New Mexico in the southwestern United States.

Hymenoxys bigelovii is a perennial herb up to 70 cm (28 in) tall. Leaves have very narrow lobes resembling branching threads. One plant will generally produce 1-5 flower heads, each head with 13–15 ray flowers and 100–250 disc flowers.
