= Henriettea squamata =

Conservation status
- Least Concern (IUCN 3.1)

Scientific classification
- Kingdom: Plantae
- Clade: Tracheophytes
- Clade: Angiosperms
- Clade: Eudicots
- Clade: Rosids
- Order: Myrtales
- Family: Melastomataceae
- Genus: Henriettea
- Species: H. squamata

Binomial name
- Henriettea squamata (Alain) Alain

Synonyms
- Henriettella squamata Alain

Species of plant

Henriettea squamata is a species of flowering plant in the family Melastomataceae. It is endemic to Cuba.
