= Hymenoxys tweediei =

Scientific classification
- Kingdom: Plantae
- Clade: Tracheophytes
- Clade: Angiosperms
- Clade: Eudicots
- Clade: Asterids
- Order: Asterales
- Family: Asteraceae
- Genus: Hymenoxys
- Species: H. tweediei

Binomial name
- Hymenoxys tweediei Hook. & Arn. 1841

Synonyms
- Actinea tweediei (Hook. & Arn.) Kuntze; Actinella tweediei (Hook. & Arn.) Malme

Species of flowering plant

Hymenoxys tweediei is a South American species of flowering plant in the daisy family. It has been found mostly in Uruguay with a few populations in northeastern Argentina (Entre Rios Province) and southern Brazil (Rio Grande do Sul).

Hymenoxys tweediei is a succulent annual up to 35 cm (14 in) tall. Leaves are divided in thin, narrow segments. Flower heads each contain 135-196 disc flowers and 7-9 ray flowers.
