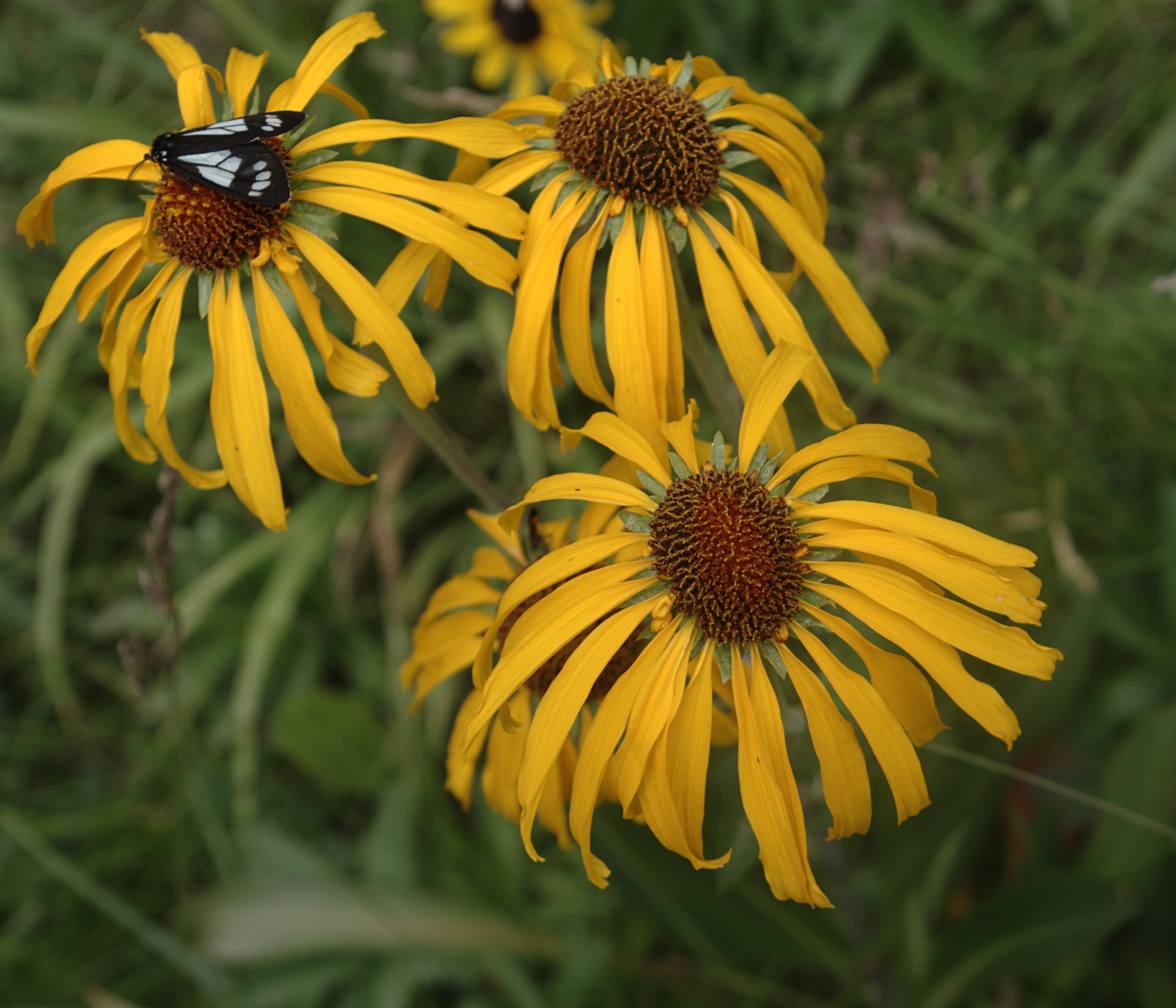
- Flowers with Gnophaela vermiculata

Conservation status
- Secure (NatureServe)

Scientific classification
- Kingdom: Plantae
- Clade: Embryophytes
- Clade: Tracheophytes
- Clade: Angiosperms
- Clade: Eudicots
- Clade: Asterids
- Order: Asterales
- Family: Asteraceae
- Genus: Hymenoxys
- Species: H. hoopesii

Binomial name
- Hymenoxys hoopesii (A.Gray) Bierner 1994

Synonyms
- Dugaldia hoopesii (A.Gray) Rydb.; Helenium hoopesii A.Gray 1864; Heleniastrum hoopesii (A. Gray) Kuntze

= Hymenoxys hoopesii =

Species of flowering plant

Hymenoxys hoopesii (formerly Dugaldia hoopesii) is a species of flowering plant in the daisy family known by the common names owl's claws, orange sneezeweed, and yerba del lobo. It is native to the western United States, where it grows in habitats of moderate elevation, such as mountain meadows in the Rocky Mountains, Sierra Nevada, southern Cascades, and other ranges. It has been found from Arizona, New Mexico, and central California north as far as Montana and Oregon.

H. hoopesii is an erect perennial herb growing up to about 1 meter (40 inches) in height, with smooth-edged leaves up to 30 centimetres (12 inches) long, oval on the lower stem and lance-shaped toward the top. Blooming from July to September, the inflorescence bears several flower heads on erect peduncles, each lined with a base of hairy, pointed phyllaries. The flower head is up to 7.5 cm (3 in) wide and has a center of 100–325 tiny disc florets fringed with 14–26 orange or yellow ray florets, each ray up to 2.5 cm (1 in) long. The fruit is an achene with a pappus of scales.

The species is toxic to livestock, especially sheep. The pollen also causes an allergenic reaction, hence the common name 'sneezeweed'.

The root has been used medicinally to treat rheumatism, upset stomachs, and indigestion in infants.
