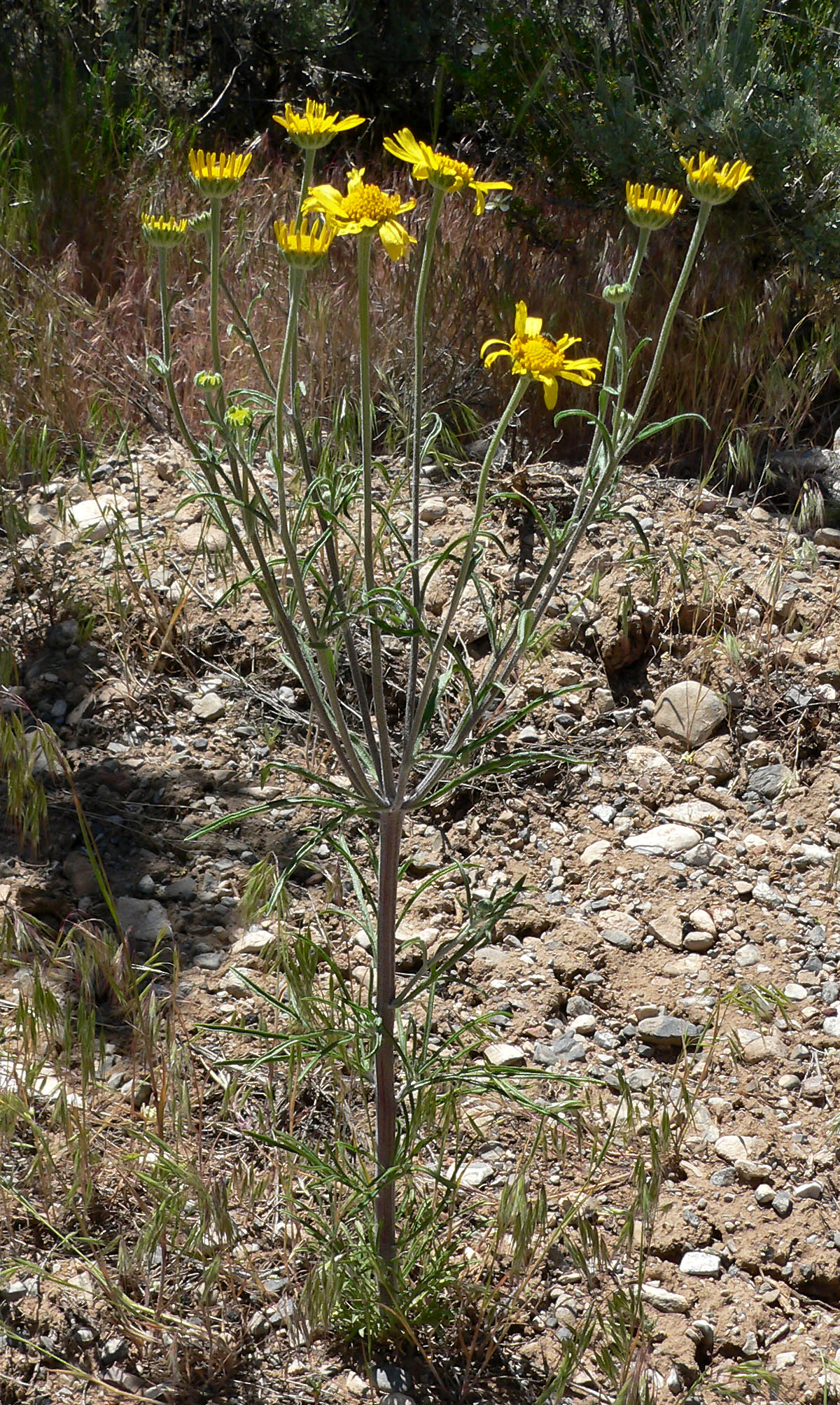

Conservation status
- Vulnerable (NatureServe)

Scientific classification
- Kingdom: Plantae
- Clade: Tracheophytes
- Clade: Angiosperms
- Clade: Eudicots
- Clade: Asterids
- Order: Asterales
- Family: Asteraceae
- Genus: Hymenoxys
- Species: H. lemmonii

Binomial name
- Hymenoxys lemmonii (E. Greene) Cockerell 1904

Synonyms
- Synonymy: Hymenoxys lemmoni (E. Greene) Cockerell; Picradenia lemmonii Greene 1898; Picradenia lemmoni Greene 1898; Actinea lemmoni (Greene) S.F. Blake; Actinea lemmonii (Greene) S.F. Blake

= Hymenoxys lemmonii =

Species of flowering plant

Hymenoxys lemmonii is a species of flowering plant in the daisy family known by the common names Lemmon's rubberweed, Lemmon's bitterweed, and alkali hymenoxys. It is native to the western United States in and around the Great Basin in Utah, Nevada, northern California, and southeastern Oregon.

Hymenoxys lemmonii is a biennial or perennial herb with one or more branching stems growing erect to a maximum height near 50 centimeters (20 inches). It produces straight, dark green leaves up to 9 centimeters (3.6 inches) long and divided into a number of narrow, pointed lobes. The foliage and stem may be hairless to quite woolly. The daisy-like flower head is generally at least 1.5 centimeters (0.6 inches) wide, with a center of 50–125 thick golden disc florets and a shaggy fringe of 9–12 golden ray florets.

The species is named for John Gill Lemmon, husband of prominent American botanist Sarah Plummer Lemmon.
