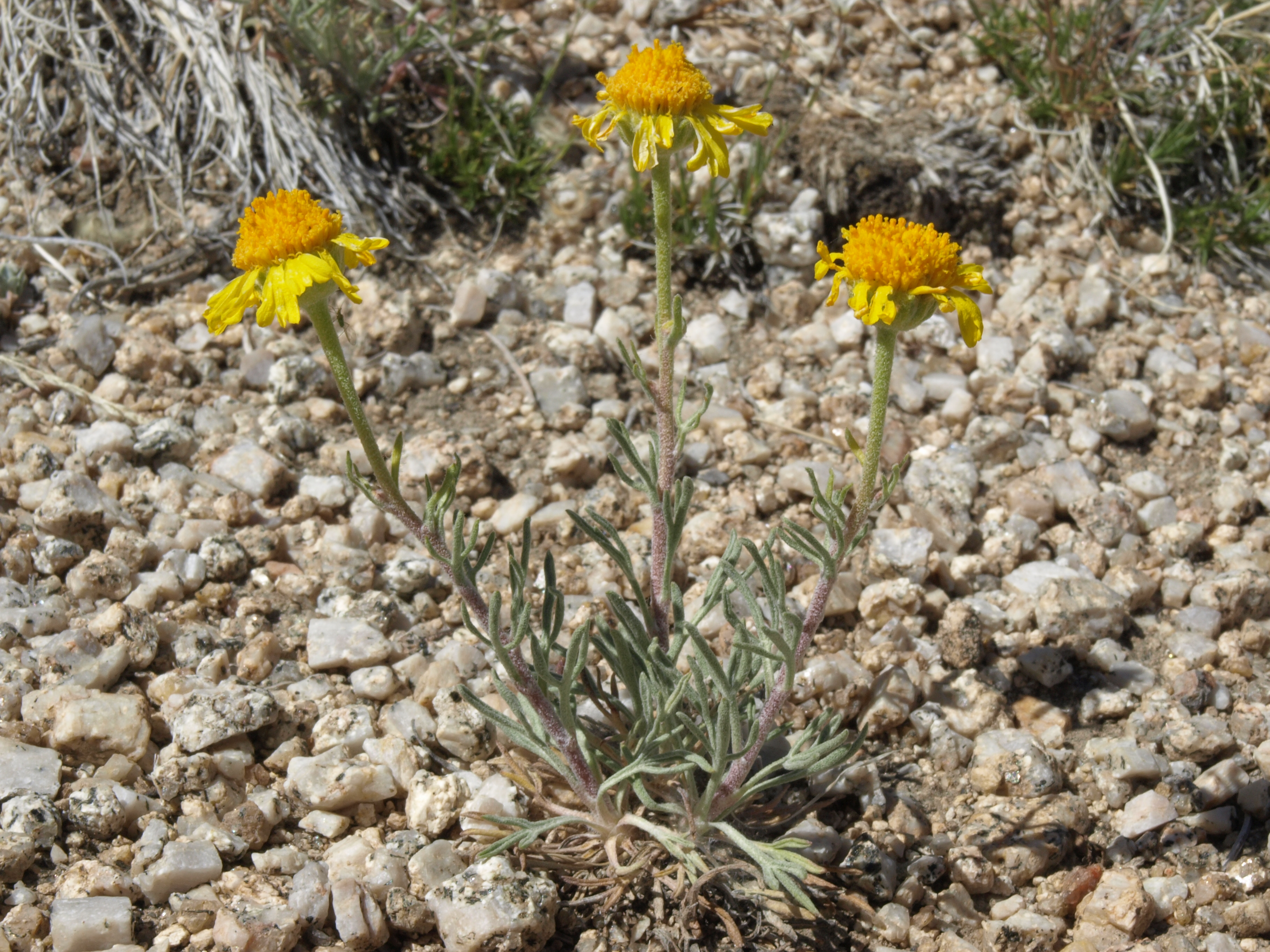

Scientific classification
- Kingdom: Plantae
- Clade: Tracheophytes
- Clade: Angiosperms
- Clade: Eudicots
- Clade: Asterids
- Order: Asterales
- Family: Asteraceae
- Genus: Hymenoxys
- Species: H. cooperi

Binomial name
- Hymenoxys cooperi (Gray) Cockerell 1904

Synonyms
- Actinella cooperi A. Gray 1861; Actinea cooperi (A. Gray) Kuntze; Picradenia cooperi (A. Gray) Greene; Actinea canescens (D.C.Eaton ex D.C.Eaton) S.F.Blake; Hymenoxys canescens Cockerell; Picradenia canescens (D.C.Eaton ex D.C.Eaton) Greene; Actinella richardsonii var. canescens D.C.Eaton

= Hymenoxys cooperi =

Species of flowering plant

Hymenoxys cooperi is a species of flowering plant in the daisy family known by the common name Cooper's rubberweed. It is native to the southwestern United States and Great Basin, where it grows in rocky soils in arid regions from southern California to New Mexico, north as far as Idaho and Oregon.

Hymenoxys cooperi is a biennial or perennial herb with a branching stem growing erect to heights between 15 and 90 centimeters (6-36 inches or 0.5-3.0 feet). It produces narrow, pointed leaves with two lateral lobes that form a trident shape. The foliage and stem are glandular and waxy, usually with a thin coat of light-colored hairs. The daisy-like flower head is a cup of fused phyllaries with 30–150 tiny yellow-orange disc florets surrounded by 9–14 bright yellow ray florets, each ray about a centimeter (0.4 inches) long.
