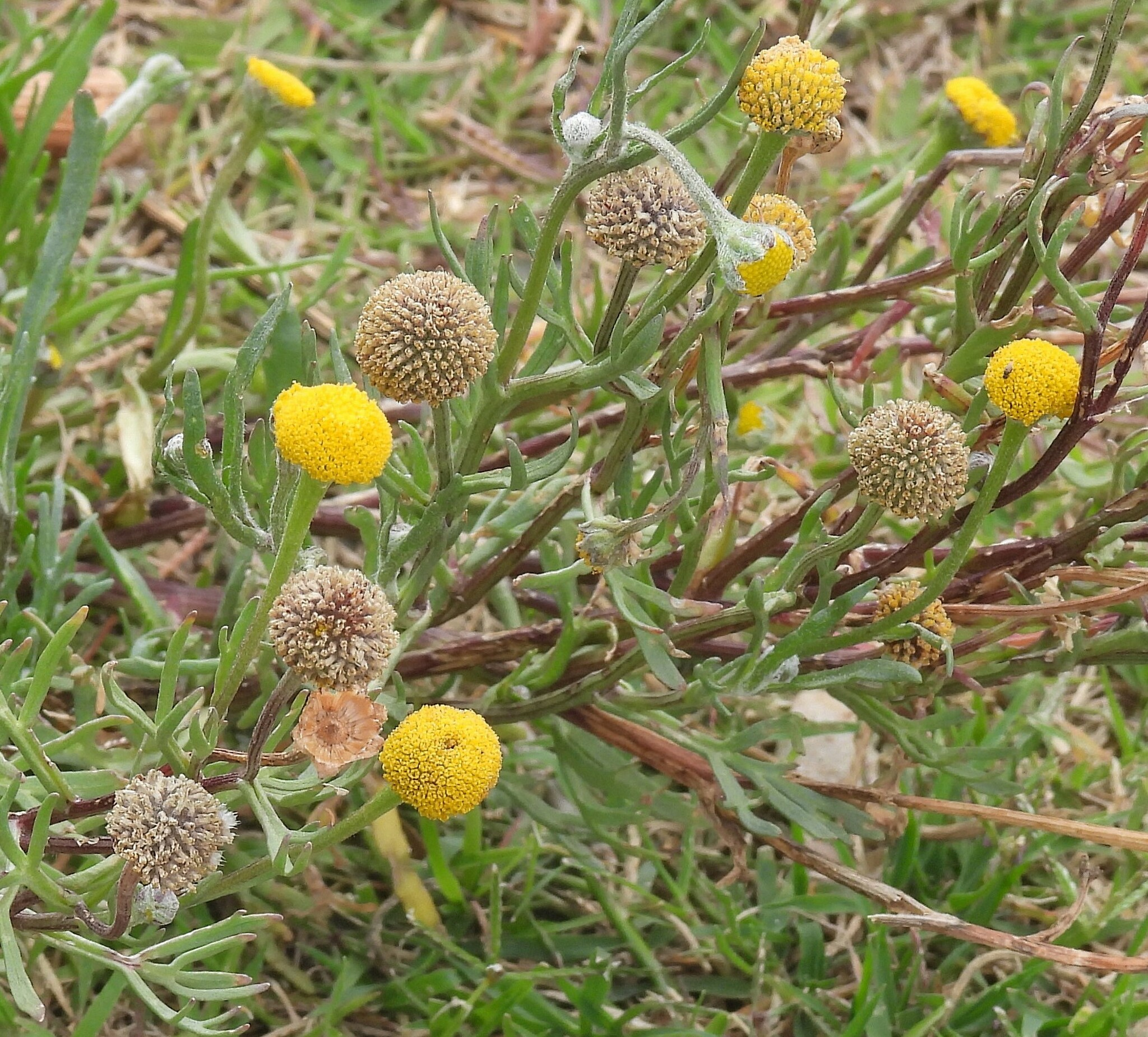

Scientific classification
- Kingdom: Plantae
- Clade: Tracheophytes
- Clade: Angiosperms
- Clade: Eudicots
- Clade: Asterids
- Order: Asterales
- Family: Asteraceae
- Genus: Hymenoxys
- Species: H. robusta

Binomial name
- Hymenoxys robusta (Rusby) K.F.Parker 1962

Synonyms
- Cephalophora robusta Rusby 1893

= Hymenoxys robusta =

Species of plant

Hymenoxys robusta is a South American species of flowering plant in the daisy family. It has been found primarily in Bolivia with a few populations in nearby Peru and Argentina.

Hymenoxys robusta is a foul-smelling perennial with a branching root. Leaves remain attached to the stem after they die and turn black. Flower heads contain disc flowers but no ray flowers.
