= Hymenoxys vaseyi =

Conservation status
- Imperiled (NatureServe)

Scientific classification
- Kingdom: Plantae
- Clade: Tracheophytes
- Clade: Angiosperms
- Clade: Eudicots
- Clade: Asterids
- Order: Asterales
- Family: Asteraceae
- Genus: Hymenoxys
- Species: H. vaseyi

Binomial name
- Hymenoxys vaseyi (A.Gray) Cockerell

Synonyms
- Homotypic synonyms: Actinea vaseyi (A.Gray) Kuntze; Actinella vaseyi A.Gray; Picradenia vaseyi (A.Gray) Greene

Species of flowering plant

Hymenoxys vaseyi is a species of flowering plant in the daisy family Asteraceae. It is native to the Southwestern United States. The specific epithet vaseyi honors the American plant collector George Richard Vasey (not to be confused with his father George Vasey) who made extensive collections in the region in 1880 and 1881. The species is commonly called Vasey's rubberweed.

== Description ==
Hymenoxys vaseyi is a perennial herb up to 60 cm (2.0 ft) tall. One plant can produce as many as 50 flower heads in a branching array. Each head has 8-11 yellow ray flowers and 25-80 tiny yellow disc flowers.

== Taxonomy ==
Hymenoxys vaseyi was first described as Actinella vaseyi by the American botanist Asa Gray in 1882. The type specimen was collected by George Richard Vasey in the Organ Mountains of New Mexico in 1881. The American botanist Theodore Dru Alison Cockerell placed Actinella vaseyi in genus Hymenoxys in 1904. As of January 2025, Hymenoxys vaseyi (A.Gray) Cockerell is a widely accepted name.

== Distribution and habitat ==
Hymenoxys vaseyi grows in open areas, generally at the edges of forests at elevations of 2,100–2,800 meters (6,900–9,200 ft). It is native to the southwestern United States, primarily in New Mexico with a few populations in extreme western Texas (El Paso County).

== Bibliography ==
- Cockerell, T. D. A. (1904). "The North American species of Hymenoxys". Bulletin of the Torrey Botanical Club. 31 (9): 461–509.
- Gray, Asa (1882). "Contributions to North American botany". Proceedings of the American Academy of Arts and Sciences. 17: 163–230.
