= Hymenoxys biennis =

Scientific classification
- Kingdom: Plantae
- Clade: Tracheophytes
- Clade: Angiosperms
- Clade: Eudicots
- Clade: Asterids
- Order: Asterales
- Family: Asteraceae
- Genus: Hymenoxys
- Species: H. biennis

Binomial name
- Hymenoxys biennis (A.Gray) H.M.Hall 1907

Synonyms
- Actinea biennis (A.Gray) Kuntze; Actinella biennis A.Gray 1878; Picradenia biennis (A.Gray) Greene; Hymenoxys canescens subsp. biennis (A. Gray) Cockerell

Species of flowering plant

Hymenoxys biennis is a North American species of flowering plant in the daisy family. It is native to the state of Utah in the western United States.
