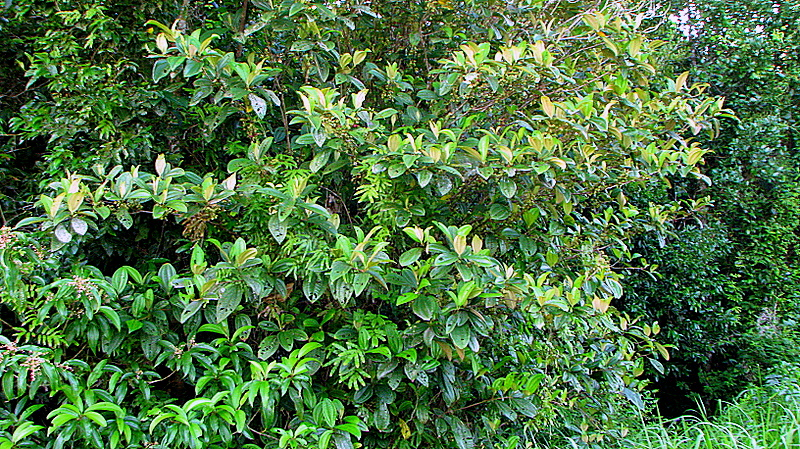
- Henriettea succosa

Scientific classification
- Kingdom: Plantae
- Clade: Tracheophytes
- Clade: Angiosperms
- Clade: Eudicots
- Clade: Rosids
- Order: Myrtales
- Family: Melastomataceae
- Genus: Henriettea; DC.

Species
- See text

Synonyms
- Henriettella Naudin; Llewelynia Pittier; Phyllopus DC.

= Henriettea =

Genus of flowering plants

Henriettea is a genus of flowering plants in the family Melastomataceae, with some 399 species accepted. It is distributed in the Americas. Some species in the genus are known commonly as camasey., though the common name camasey may also refer to plants of genus Miconia.

Species accepted as of March 2021 are:

- Henriettea acunae (Alain) Alain
- Henriettea aggregata (D.Don) J.F.Macbr.
- Henriettea angustifolia O.Berg ex Triana
- Henriettea barkeri (Urb. & Ekman) Alain
- Henriettea boliviensis (Cogn.) Penneys, Michelang., Judd & Almeda
- Henriettea bracteosa (Wurdack) Penneys, Michelang., Judd & Almeda
- Henriettea caudata (Gleason) Penneys, Michelang., Judd & Almeda
- Henriettea ciliata (Urb. & Ekman) Alain
- Henriettea cuabae (Urb.) Borhidi
- Henriettea cuneata (Standl.) L.O.Williams
- Henriettea duckeana (Hoehne) Penneys, Michelang., Judd & Almeda
- Henriettea ekmanii (Urb.) Alain
- Henriettea fascicularis (Sw.) M.Gómez
- Henriettea fissanthera (Gleason) Penneys, Michelang., Judd & Almeda
- Henriettea flavescens Baill.
- Henriettea gibberosa (Urb.) Alain
- Henriettea glabra (Vell.) Penneys, Michelang., Judd & Almeda
- Henriettea gomesii Brade
- Henriettea goudotiana (Naudin) Penneys, Michelang., Judd & Almeda
- Henriettea granulata O.Berg ex Triana
- Henriettea heteroneura (Gleason) Penneys, Michelang., Judd & Almeda
- Henriettea hondurensis (Wurdack) Penneys, Michelang., Judd & Almeda
- Henriettea horridula Pilg.
- Henriettea hotteana (Urb. & Ekman) Alain
- Henriettea ininiensis (Wurdack) Penneys, Michelang., Judd & Almeda
- Henriettea lasiostylis Pilg.
- Henriettea lateriflora (Vahl) R.A.Howard & E.A.Kellogg
- Henriettea lawrancei (Gleason) Penneys, Michelang., Judd & Almeda
- Henriettea loretensis (Gleason) J.F.Macbr.
- Henriettea lundellii (Wurdack) Penneys, Michelang., Judd & Almeda
- Henriettea macfadyenii (Triana) Alain
- Henriettea maguirei (Wurdack) Penneys, Michelang., Judd & Almeda
- Henriettea manarae (Wurdack) Penneys, Michelang., Judd & Almeda
- Henriettea maroniensis Sagot
- Henriettea martiusii (DC.) Naudin
- Henriettea megaloclada (Urb. & Ekman) Alain
- Henriettea membranifolia (Cogn.) Alain
- Henriettea mucronata (Gleason) S.S.Renner
- Henriettea multiflora Naudin
- Henriettea multigemma Carmenate & Michelang.
- Henriettea odorata (Markgr.) Penneys, Michelang., Judd & Almeda
- Henriettea ovata (Cogn.) Penneys, Michelang., Judd & Almeda
- Henriettea patrisiana DC.
- Henriettea prancei (Wurdack) Penneys, Michelang., Judd & Almeda
- Henriettea punctata M.Gómez
- Henriettea ramiflora (Sw.) DC.
- Henriettea reflexa (Urb. & Ekman) Alain
- Henriettea rimosa (Wurdack) Penneys, Michelang., Judd & Almeda
- Henriettea saldanhaei Cogn.
- Henriettea seemannii (Naudin) L.O.Williams
- Henriettea sessilifolia (L.) Alain
- Henriettea sierrae Carmenate & Bécquer
- Henriettea spruceana Cogn.
- Henriettea squamata (Alain) Alain
- Henriettea squamulosa (Cogn.) Judd
- Henriettea stellaris O.Berg ex Triana
- Henriettea steyermarkii (Wurdack) Penneys, Michelang., Judd & Almeda
- Henriettea strigosa Gleason
- Henriettea succosa DC.
- Henriettea tachirensis (Wurdack) Penneys, Michelang., Judd & Almeda
- Henriettea tobagensis (Wurdack) Penneys, Michelang., Judd & Almeda
- Henriettea tovarensis (Cogn.) Penneys, Michelang., Judd & Almeda
- Henriettea trachyphylla (Triana) Penneys, Michelang., Judd & Almeda
- Henriettea triflora (Vahl) Alain
- Henriettea tuberculosa (Donn.Sm.) L.O.Williams
- Henriettea uniflora Judd, Skean, Penneys & Michelang.
- Henriettea verrucosa (Triana) J.F.Macbr.
- Henriettea williamsii (Pittier) Penneys, Michelang., Judd & Almeda
