= Henriettea ininiensis =

Conservation status
- Vulnerable (IUCN 2.3)

Scientific classification
- Kingdom: Plantae
- Clade: Tracheophytes
- Clade: Angiosperms
- Clade: Eudicots
- Clade: Rosids
- Order: Myrtales
- Family: Melastomataceae
- Genus: Henriettea
- Species: H. ininiensis

Binomial name
- Henriettea ininiensis (Wurdack) Penneys, Michelang., Judd & Almeda

Synonyms
- Henriettella ininiensis Wurdack

Species of flowering plant

Henriettea ininiensis is a species of plant in the family Melastomataceae. It is endemic to French Guiana.
