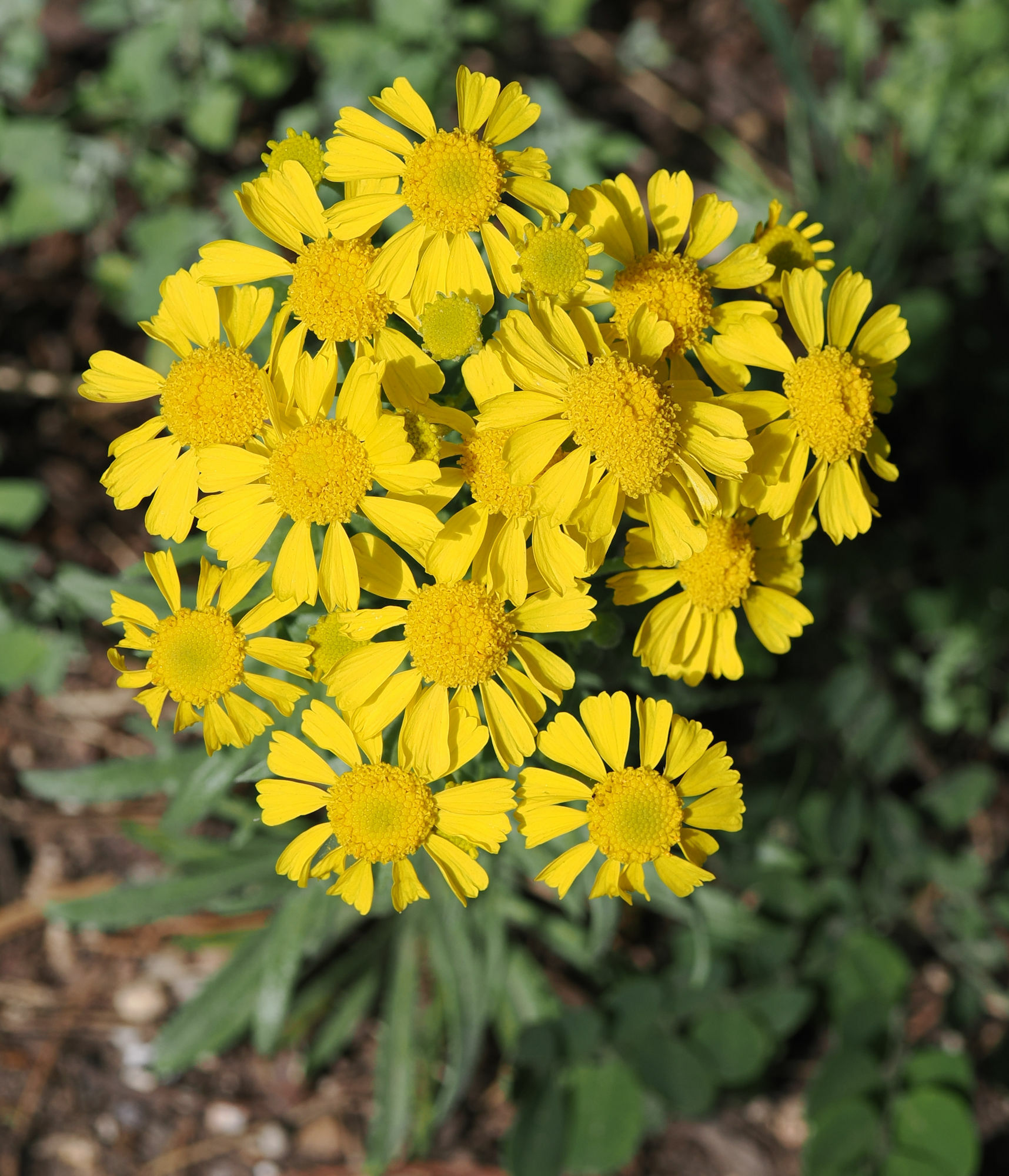

Scientific classification
- Kingdom: Plantae
- Clade: Tracheophytes
- Clade: Angiosperms
- Clade: Eudicots
- Clade: Asterids
- Order: Asterales
- Family: Asteraceae
- Genus: Hymenoxys
- Species: H. subintegra

Binomial name
- Hymenoxys subintegra Cockerell 1904

Synonyms
- Actinea subintegra (Cockerell) S.F.Blake

= Hymenoxys subintegra =

Species of flowering plant

Hymenoxys subintegra is a North American species of flowering plant in the daisy family known by the common name Arizona rubberweed. It has been found only in the states of Arizona and Utah in the southwestern United States. Many of the populations lie inside Grand Canyon National Park, others in Kaibab National Forest.

Hymenoxys subintegra grows in open areas, generally at the edges of forests at elevations of 2,100–2,800 meters (6,900–9,200 ft). It is a perennial herb up to 60 cm (2.0 ft) tall. One plant can produce 10–85 flower heads in a branching, flat-topped array. Each head has 10–16 yellow ray flowers and 50–100 tiny yellow disc flowers.
