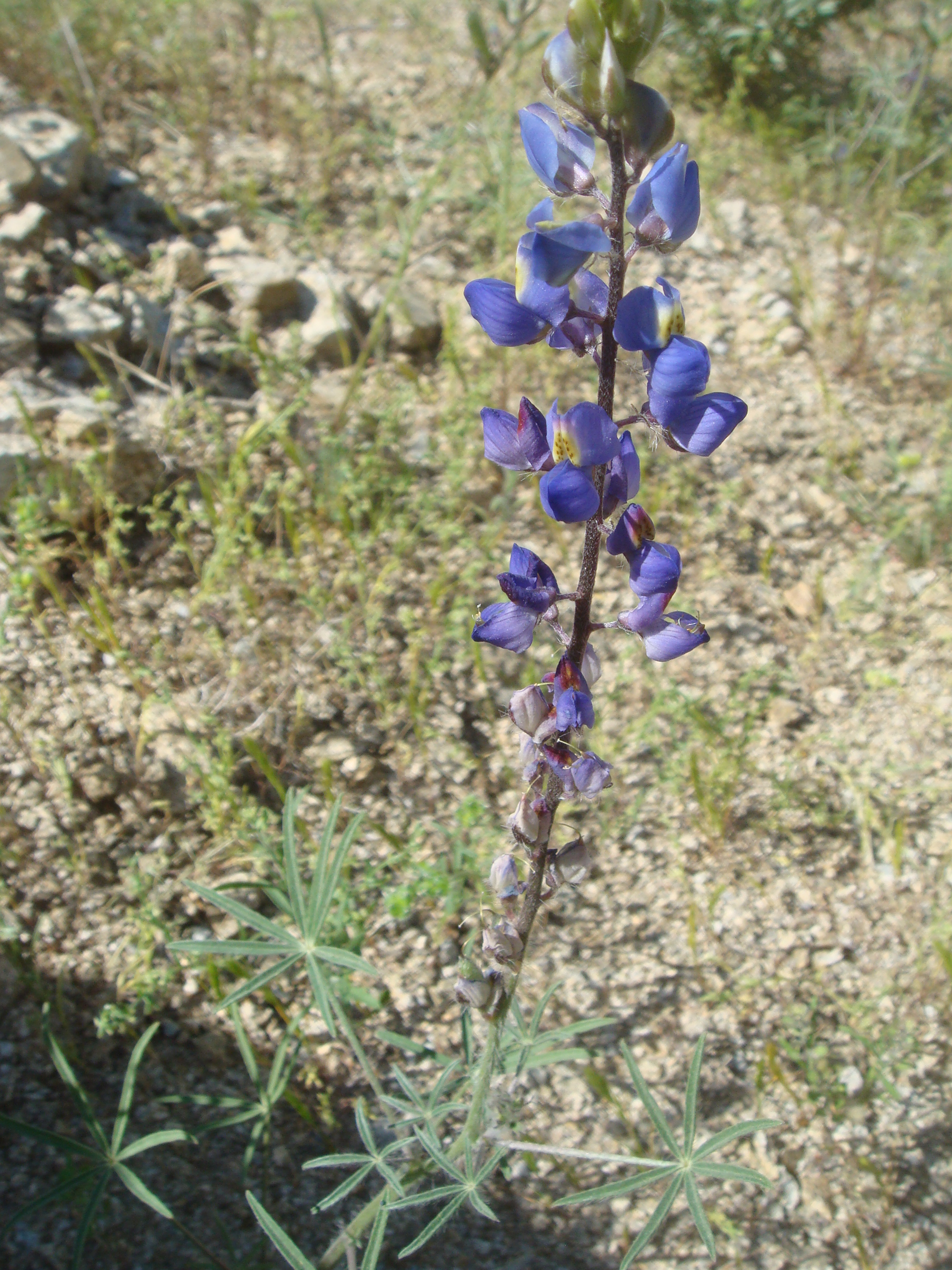

Scientific classification
- Kingdom: Plantae
- Clade: Tracheophytes
- Clade: Angiosperms
- Clade: Eudicots
- Clade: Rosids
- Order: Fabales
- Family: Fabaceae
- Subfamily: Faboideae
- Genus: Lupinus
- Species: L. sparsiflorus

Binomial name
- Lupinus sparsiflorus Benth.

= Lupinus sparsiflorus =

Species of legume

Lupinus sparsiflorus (Coulter's lupine) is a species of lupin native to North America. In the United States it occurs in California, Nevada, Arizona and Utah, and in Mexico it is found in Baja California and Sonora. Other common names include Mojave lupine, a name it shares with Lupinus odoratus.

This is an annual herb growing 20 to 40 centimetres tall. Each palmate leaf is made up of 7 to 11 very narrow leaflets up to 3 centimetres long and just a few millimetres wide. The inflorescence is a spiral of several flowers each around a centimetre long. The flower is blue or purple, becoming darker with age, with a white to pink patch on its banner.

The desert lupine flower is pale blue or purple. The upper petal (banner) has a yellow spot which changes to reddish after pollination. The two bottom petals (keel) are short and wide, hairy on the bottom edge and curve upward to a slender tip. When ripe, the seed pods explode, scattering their seed in the wind.

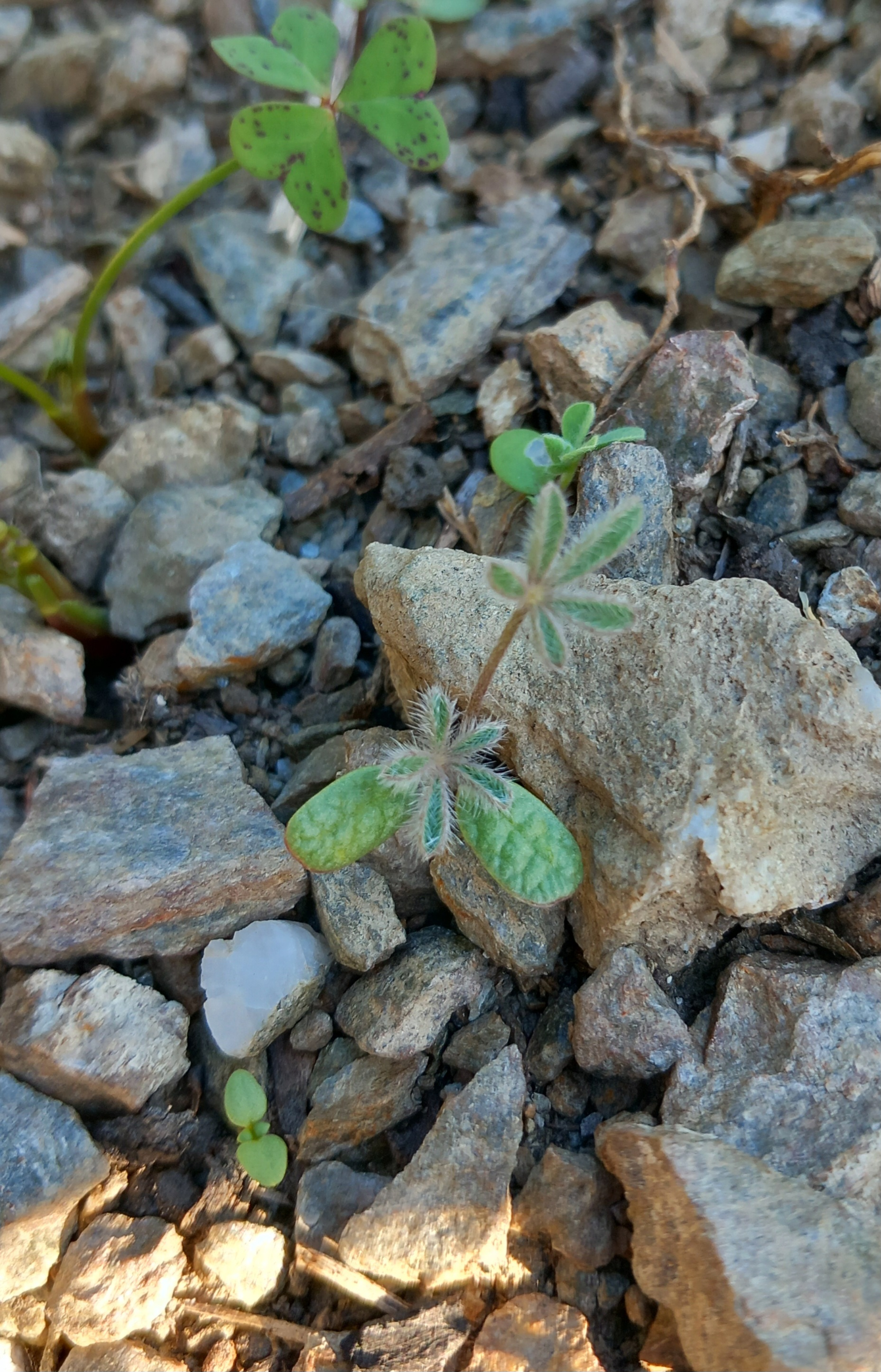
A seedling showing hairy leaflets that are typical of the species
