= Hymenoxys quinquesquamata =

Scientific classification
- Kingdom: Plantae
- Clade: Tracheophytes
- Clade: Angiosperms
- Clade: Eudicots
- Clade: Asterids
- Order: Asterales
- Family: Asteraceae
- Genus: Hymenoxys
- Species: H. quinquesquamata

Binomial name
- Hymenoxys quinquesquamata Rydb.
- native distribution of Hymenoxys quinquesquamata

Synonyms
- Actinea quinquesquamata (Rydb.) S.F.Blake

Species of flowering plant

Hymenoxys quinquesquamata is a North American species of flowering plant in the family Asteraceae known by the common names rincon rubberweed or rincon bitterweed. It has been found only in the states of Arizona and New Mexico in the southwestern United States. Many of the populations lie in the Huachuca Mountains of Cochise County in Arizona.

Hymenoxys quinquesquamata grows in open areas, generally at the edges of pine-oak forests at elevations of 1,500–2,500 meters (4,900–8,200 ft). It is a perennial herb up to 100 cm (39 in) tall. One plant can produce sometimes as many as 50 flower heads in a branching array. Each head has 5–8 yellow ray flowers and 30–100 tiny yellow disc flowers.
