= Henriettea punctata =

Conservation status
- Vulnerable (IUCN 2.3)

Scientific classification
- Kingdom: Plantae
- Clade: Tracheophytes
- Clade: Angiosperms
- Clade: Eudicots
- Clade: Rosids
- Order: Myrtales
- Family: Melastomataceae
- Genus: Henriettea
- Species: H. punctata

Binomial name
- Henriettea punctata (Griseb.) M.Gomez

Synonyms
- Henriettella punctata (Griseb.) C.Wright; Ossaea punctata Griseb.

Species of flowering plant

Henriettea punctata is a species of flowering plant in the family Melastomataceae. It is endemic to Cuba.
