= Hymenoxys insignis =

Scientific classification
- Kingdom: Plantae
- Clade: Tracheophytes
- Clade: Angiosperms
- Clade: Eudicots
- Clade: Asterids
- Order: Asterales
- Family: Asteraceae
- Genus: Hymenoxys
- Species: H. insignis

Binomial name
- Hymenoxys insignis (A.Gray ex S.Watson) Cockerell 1904

Synonyms
- Actinea insignis (A.Gray ex S.Watson) Kuntze; Actinella insignis A.Gray ex S.Watson 1883

Species of flowering plant

Hymenoxys insignis is a Mexican species of flowering plant in the daisy family. It has been found in Coahuila, Nuevo León, and Chihuahua in northern Mexico.
