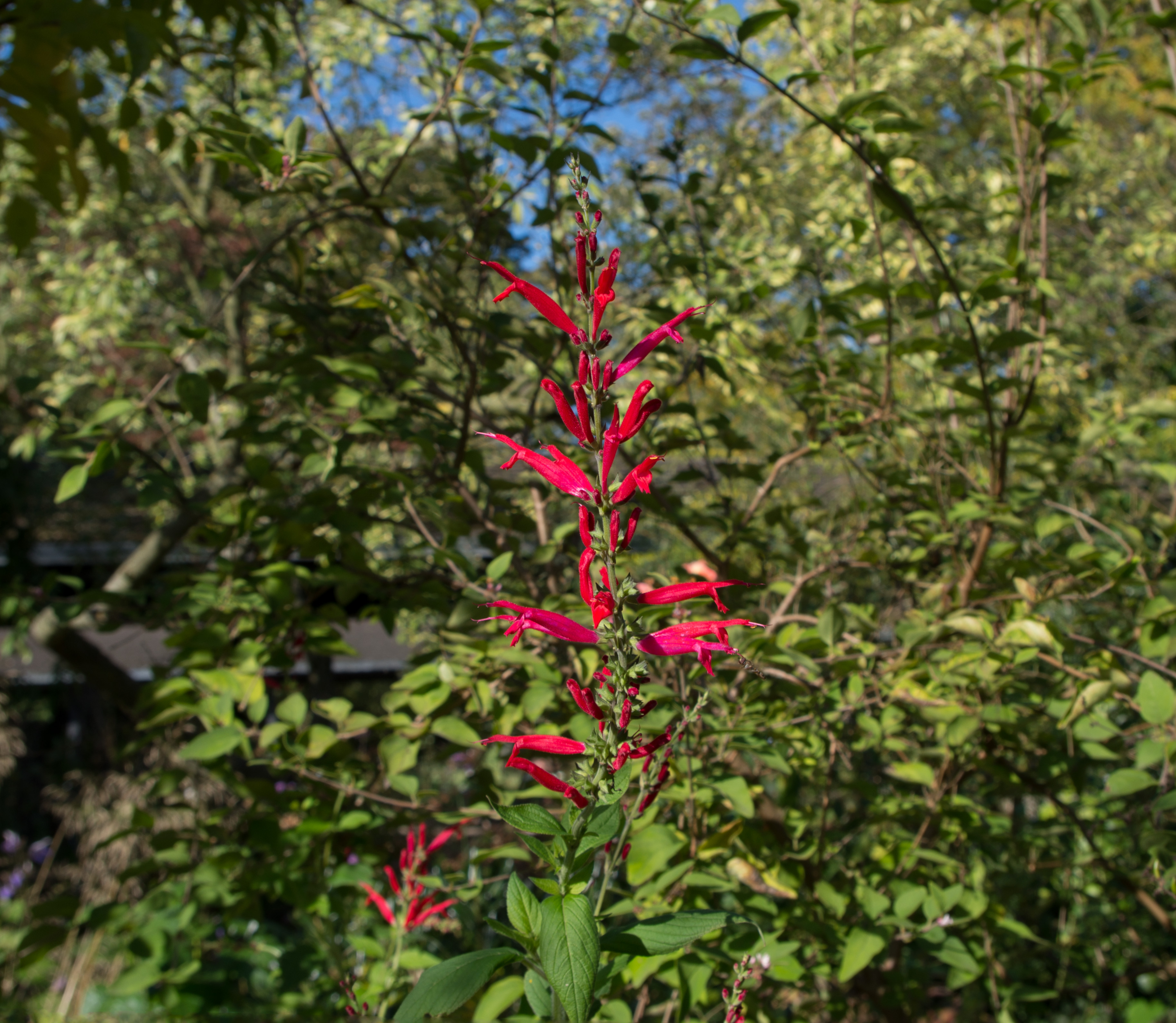

Scientific classification
- Kingdom: Plantae
- Clade: Tracheophytes
- Clade: Angiosperms
- Clade: Eudicots
- Clade: Asterids
- Order: Lamiales
- Family: Lamiaceae
- Genus: Salvia
- Species: S. haenkei

Binomial name
- Salvia haenkei Benth. 1833

Synonyms
- Salvia avicularis Briq. 1896; Salvia bridgesii Britton ex Rusby 1900; Salvia pseudoavicularis Briq. 1896

= Salvia haenkei =

Species of flowering plant

Salvia haenkei, or pampa salvia, is a shrub species of Salvia found from southern Peru to Bolivia.

== Traditional medicine ==
The plant is used in traditional Bolivian medicine as a digestive or antiemetic agent, to reduce colds and bronchitis symptoms and topically applied for wound healing.
