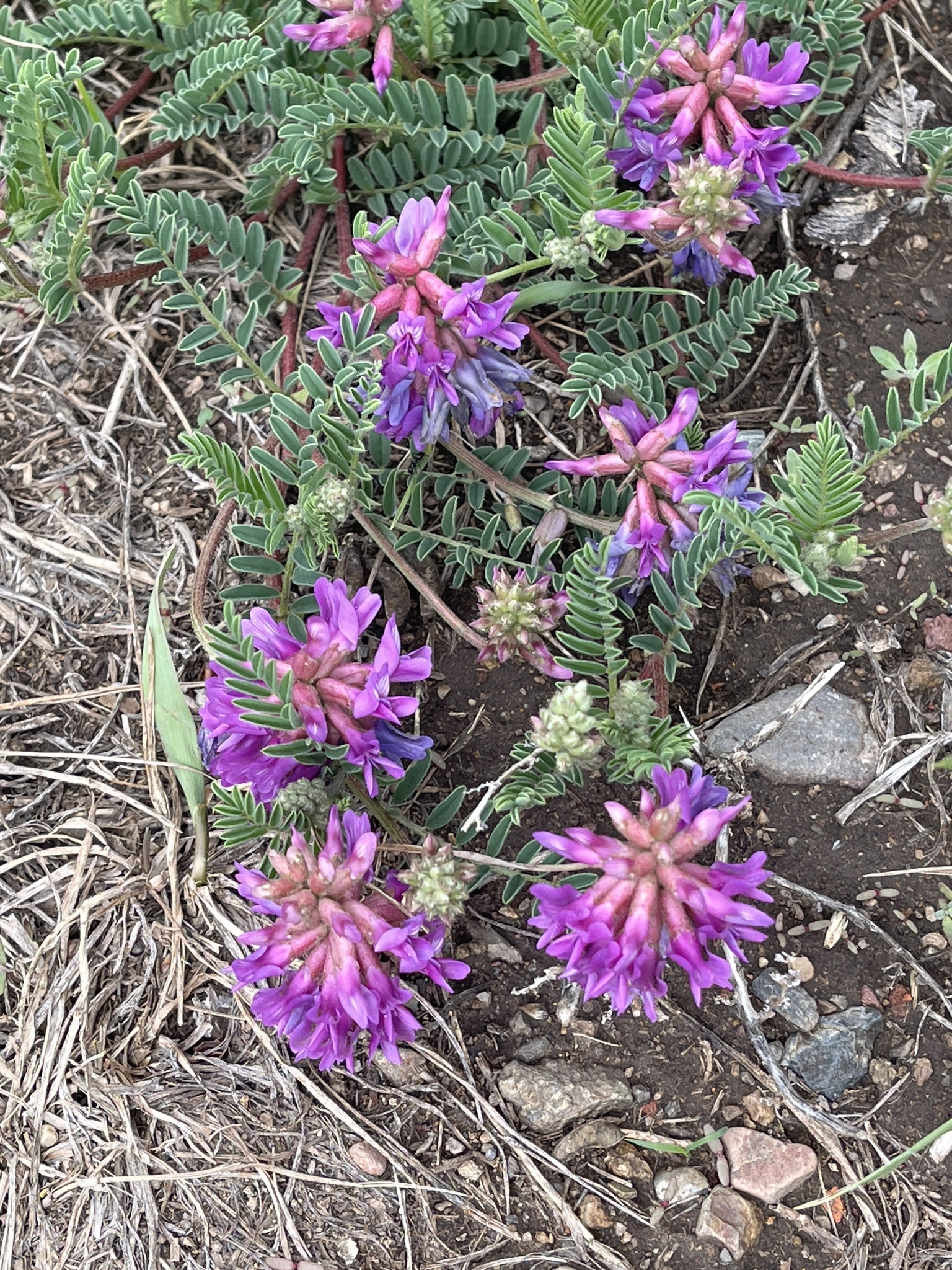
- Astragalus hallii flowering Colfax County, New Mexico

Conservation status
- Apparently Secure (NatureServe)

Scientific classification
- Kingdom: Plantae
- Clade: Tracheophytes
- Clade: Angiosperms
- Clade: Eudicots
- Clade: Rosids
- Order: Fabales
- Family: Fabaceae
- Subfamily: Faboideae
- Genus: Astragalus
- Species: A. hallii

Binomial name
- Astragalus hallii A.Gray (1864)

Varieties
- Astragalus hallii var. fallax (M.E.Jones) Barneby; Astragalus hallii var. hallii

Synonyms
- List: Astragalus aboriginorum var. richardsonii (E.Sheld.) B.Boivin (1967); Astragalus fallax S.Watson illeg.; Astragalus famelicus E.Sheld. (1894); Astragalus gracilentus var. fallax M.E.Jones (1898); Astragalus gracilentus var. hallii (A.Gray) M.E.Jones (1898); Astragalus richardsonii E.Sheld. (1894); Astragalus shearii Rydb. (1904); Atelophragma shearii (Rydb.) Rydb. (1905); Homalobus hallii (A.Gray) Rydb. (1905); Pisophaca famelica (E.Sheld.) Rydb. (1929); Pisophaca hallii (A.Gray) Rydb. (1929); Tragacantha hallii (A.Gray) Kuntze (1891)

= Astragalus hallii =

Species of flowering plant in the milkvetch genus

Astragalus hallii is a species of milkvetch in the family Fabaceae. It is native to Utah, Colorado, Arizona, and New Mexico.

== Distribution and habitat ==
It is most commonly found in the elevations of between 7,000 and 11,000 feet. It is most commonly found in the months of July and August.

It has a global rank of G4, meaning apparently secure. It also has two local ranks, it is vulnerable in New Mexico and critically endangered in Utah. Arizona and Colorado do not have a local rank for this species.
