= Henriettea odorata =

Conservation status
- Least Concern (IUCN 3.1)

Scientific classification
- Kingdom: Plantae
- Clade: Tracheophytes
- Clade: Angiosperms
- Clade: Eudicots
- Clade: Rosids
- Order: Myrtales
- Family: Melastomataceae
- Genus: Henriettea
- Species: H. odorata

Binomial name
- Henriettea odorata (Markgr.) Penneys, Michelang., Judd & Almeda

Synonyms
- Henriettella odorata Markgr.

Species of flowering plant

Henriettea odorata is a species of flowering plant in the family Melastomataceae.

It is native northern South America, from Ecuador to Nicaragua. Its natural habitat is subtropical or tropical moist montane forests.
