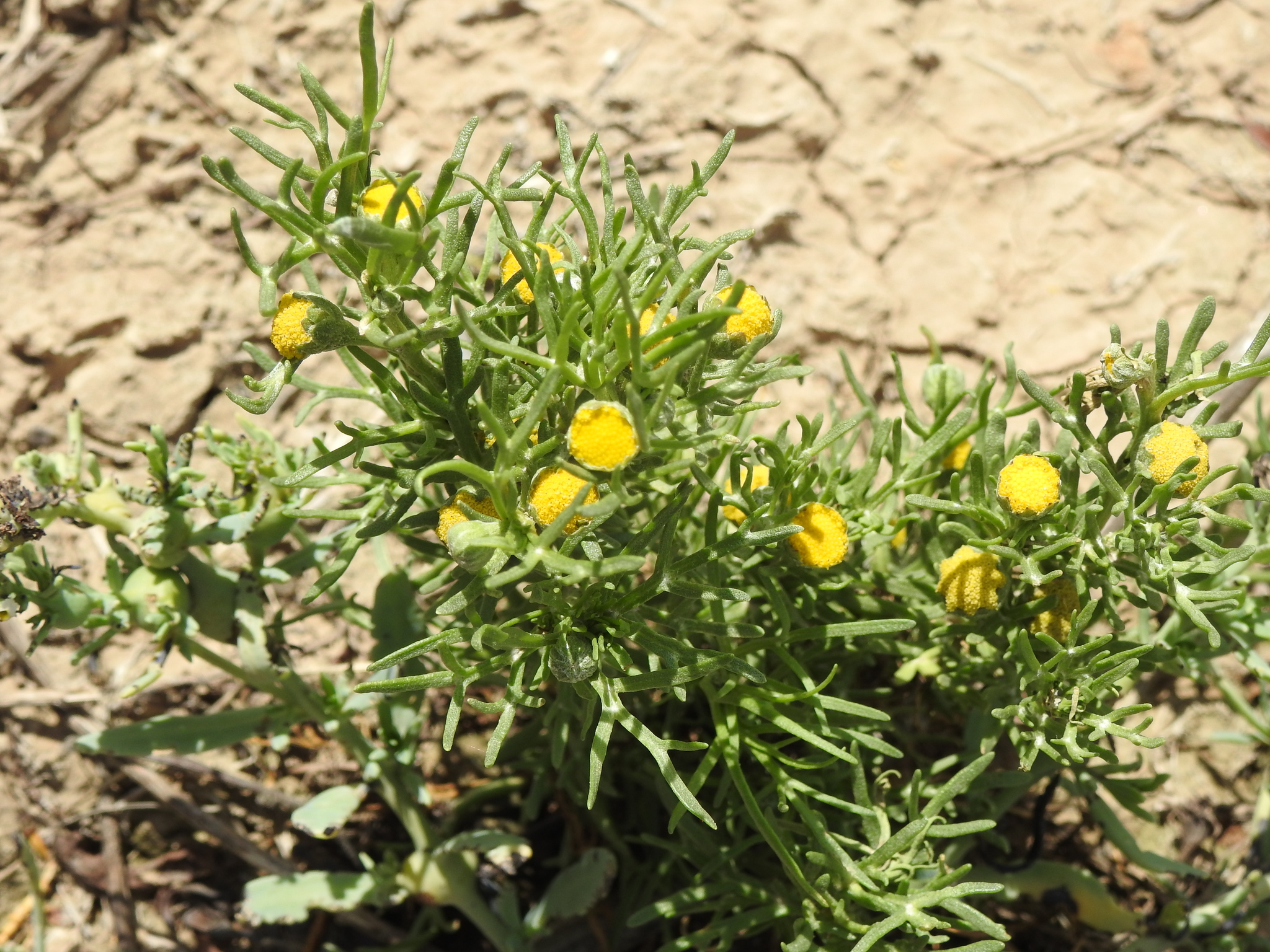

Scientific classification
- Kingdom: Plantae
- Clade: Tracheophytes
- Clade: Angiosperms
- Clade: Eudicots
- Clade: Asterids
- Order: Asterales
- Family: Asteraceae
- Genus: Hymenoxys
- Species: H. anthemoides

Binomial name
- Hymenoxys anthemoides (Juss.) Cass. ex DC. 1836

Synonyms
- Synonymy: Hymenoxys anthemoides (Juss.) Cass. 1828 not validly published; Actinea anthemoides (Juss.) Kuntze; Actinea haenkeana (DC.) Kuntze; Actinella anthemidoides (Juss.) Malme; Actinella anthemoides (Juss.) A.Gray; Actinella anthemoides Herter; Cephalophora anthemoides Less.; Hymenopappus anthemidoides Juss. 1803; Hymenopappus anthemoides Juss. 1803; Hymenoxys haenkeana DC.; Hymenoxys parodii I.M.Johnst.

= Hymenoxys anthemoides =

Species of flowering plant

Hymenoxys anthemoides, the South American rubberweed, is a South American species of flowering plants in the daisy family. It is native to Bolivia, Paraguay, Uruguay, and Argentina.
