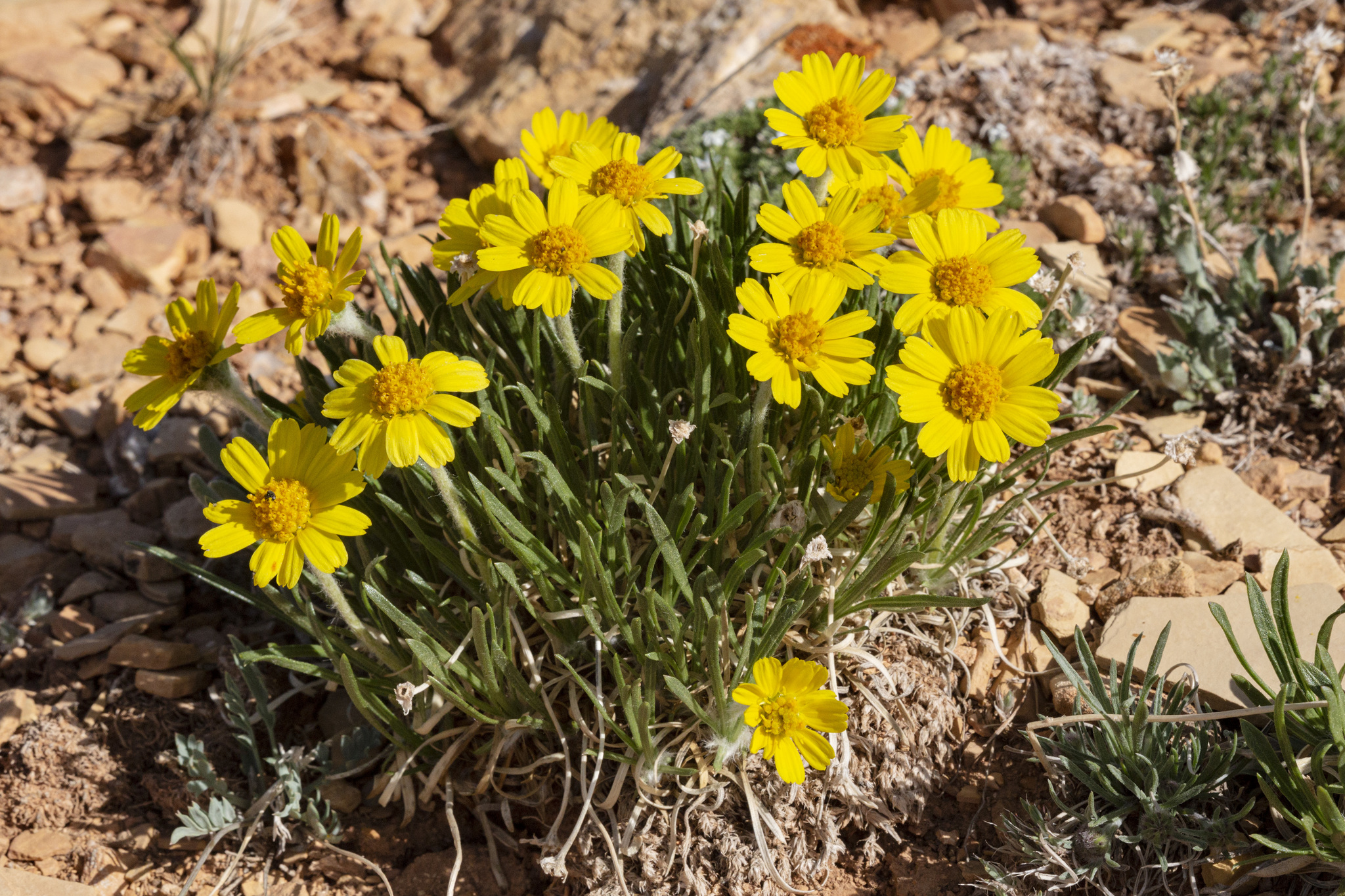
- Tetraneuris torreyana flowering Natrona County, Wyoming, USA

Conservation status
- Apparently Secure (NatureServe)

Scientific classification
- Kingdom: Plantae
- Clade: Tracheophytes
- Clade: Angiosperms
- Clade: Eudicots
- Clade: Asterids
- Order: Asterales
- Family: Asteraceae
- Genus: Tetraneuris
- Species: T. torreyana

Binomial name
- Tetraneuris torreyana (Nutt.) Greene 1898

Synonyms
- Synonymy: Actinella torreyana Nutt. 1841; Actinea torreyana (Nutt.) J.F. Macbr.; Hymenoxys torreyana (Nutt.) K.F. Parker; Actinea depressa Kuntze; Actinella depressa Harv. & Gray ex Gray; Hymenoxys depressa (Torr. & A.Gray ex A.Gray) S.L.Welsh & Reveal; Hymenoxys lapidicola S.L.Welsh & Neese; Tetraneuris depressa (Torr. & A.Gray ex A.Gray) Greene

= Tetraneuris torreyana =

Species of plant

Tetraneuris torreyana is a North American species of plants in the sunflower family, known by the common name Torrey's four-nerve daisy. It grows in the western United States, in extreme southern Montana, Arizona, New Mexico, Utah, Colorado, and Wyoming.

Tetraneuris torreyana is a perennial herb up to 15 cm (5.9 in) tall. It forms a branching underground caudex sometimes producing as many as 40 unbranched, above-ground stems. One plant can produce as many as 40 flower heads. Each head has 7–14 yellow ray flowers surrounding 25-150 yellow disc flowers.
