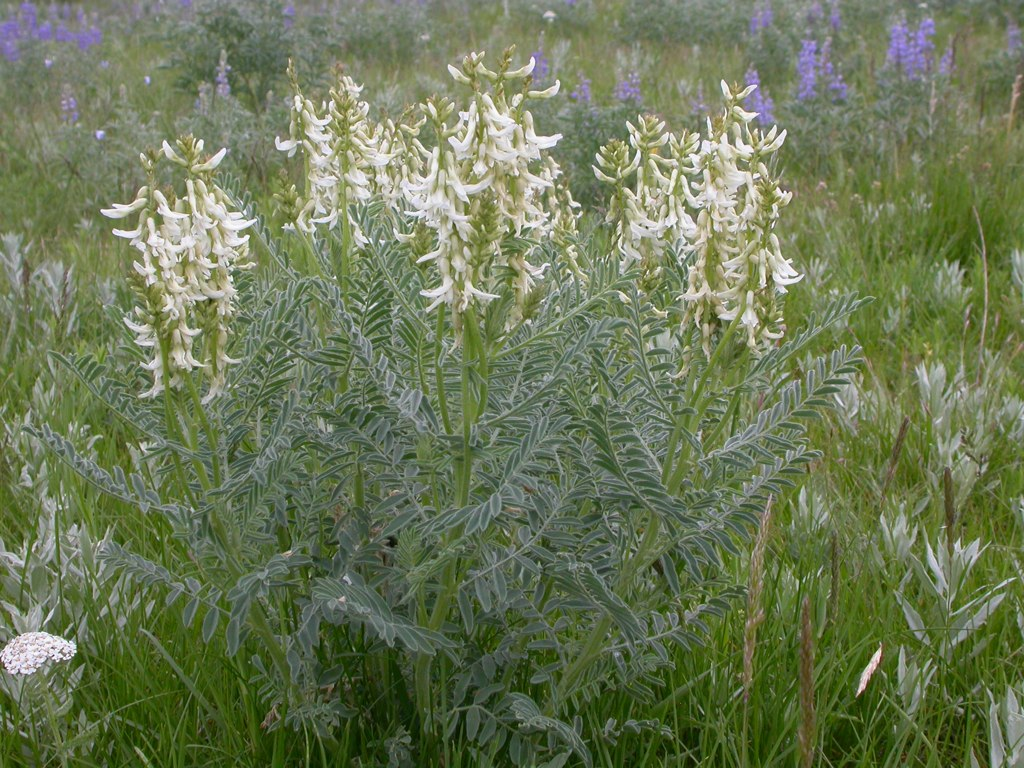
- Drummond's milkvetch is found in North America

Conservation status
- Secure (NatureServe)

Scientific classification
- Kingdom: Plantae
- Clade: Tracheophytes
- Clade: Angiosperms
- Clade: Eudicots
- Clade: Rosids
- Order: Fabales
- Family: Fabaceae
- Subfamily: Faboideae
- Genus: Astragalus
- Species: A. drummondii

Binomial name
- Astragalus drummondii Douglas ex. Hook

= Astragalus drummondii =

Species of legume

Astragalus drummondii is a species of flowering plant in the legume family known by the common name Drummond's milkvetch. The botanist Thomas Drummond first identified the plant during his travels in North America from 1825 to 1835, the year of his death. Astragalus drummondii is one of many plants named after him. Upon the return of samples collected by Drummond to England, his findings were published in Sir William Hooker’s Flora Boreali-Americana in 1840.

== Distribution ==
Astragalus drummondii is found widely across the American west and Saskatchewan, Alberta, and British Columbia. Its distribution has not changed appreciably since the species was first identified.

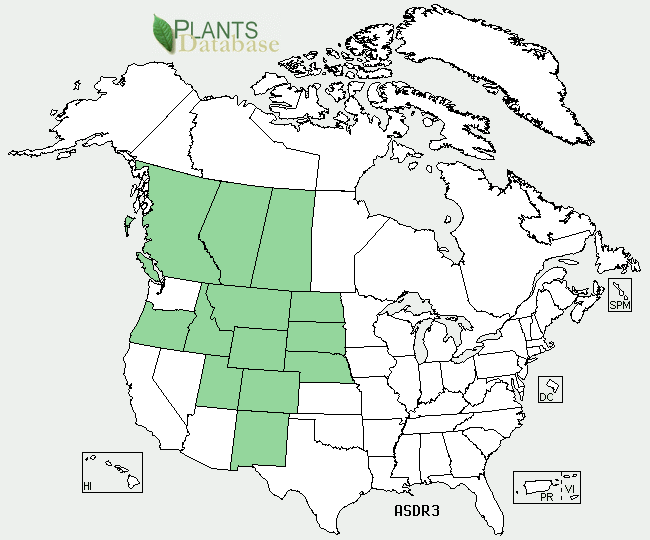
A. drummondi distribution

== Habitat and ecology ==
A. drummondii is a hardy plant that can live in a range of different climates. It flourishes in dry, light soil as well as moderately wet soils. While it grows the most plentifully on grasslands, it can also survive in oak and pine forests. It tends to collect on hillsides when present.

== Morphology ==
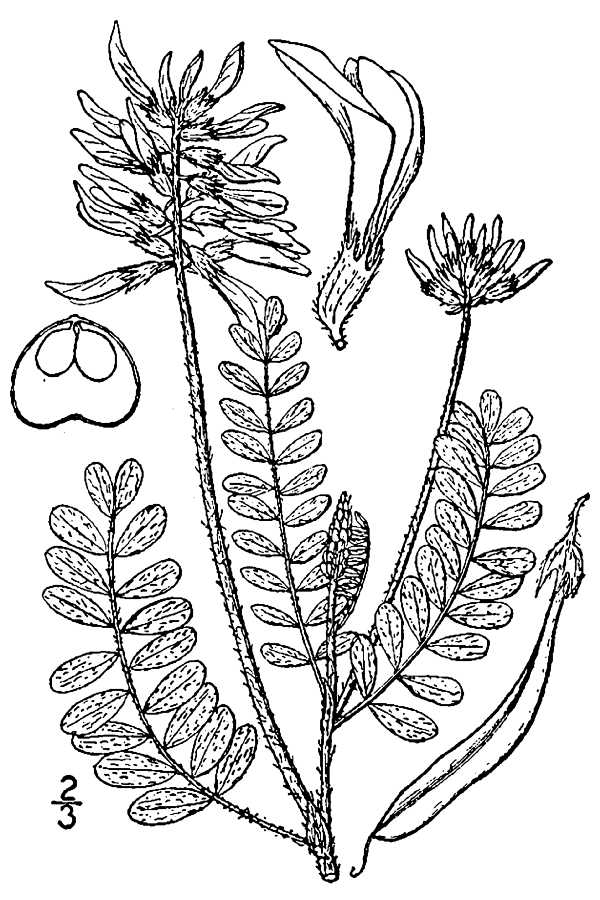
A. drummondii

Individuals of this species are herbaceous perennial plants with thick, hairy stems as well as long-hairy foliage. The plant tends to have several large stems diverging near to the ground. The plant is often 40 to 70cm tall. It has pinnately-compound leaves 6 to 14cm in length.

== Flowers and fruit ==
Flowers of Astragalus drummondii are white and 18 to 25mm long. The flowers are usually toward top of the plant, above most of the leaves. The flower's keel can sometimes be purplish in color. The sepals are small, hairy, and about 8mm long. The plant flowers in June and July. The plant has drooping hairless pods roughly 4cm long. The pod is deeply grooved along the under side (a key trait).

== Herbivory ==
Many species in the genus Astragalus are toxic. Cattle that consume Astragalus may act "crazed", and even dying. This had led the genus to be known as "locoweeds". There are three major groups of the toxicity, those that sequester selenium, those that make nitrotoxins, and those that make swainsonine (a poisonous alkaloid). Samples of A. drummondii in New Mexico were tested and found to be negative for the production of swainsonine, suggesting that this species may be safe for cattle to eat.

== Sources ==
- Budd, A. C., Jan Looman, and Keith F. Best, 1979: Budd's Flora of the Canadian Prairie Provinces. Ottawa: Research Branch, Agriculture Canada. Print
- Levere, Trevor Harvey, 1993: Science and the Canadian Arctic: A Century of Exploration, 1818-1918. Cambridge: Cambridge UP. Print.
- Standley, Paul Carpenter, 1921: Flora of Glacier National Park, Montana. Washington: Govt. Print. Off. Print.
