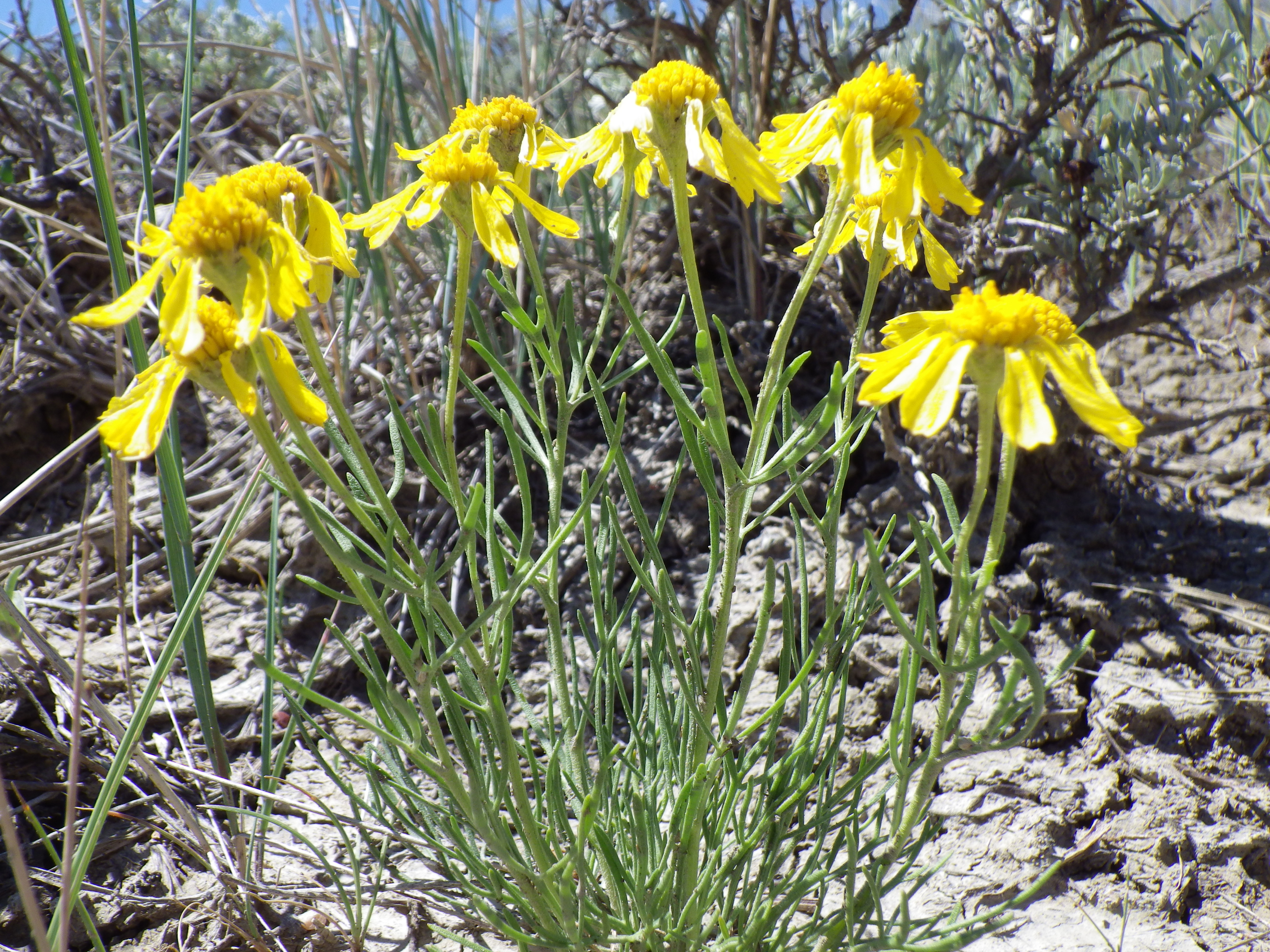
- Bozeman, Montana

Conservation status
- Secure (NatureServe)

Scientific classification
- Kingdom: Plantae
- Clade: Tracheophytes
- Clade: Angiosperms
- Clade: Eudicots
- Clade: Asterids
- Order: Asterales
- Family: Asteraceae
- Genus: Hymenoxys
- Species: H. richardsonii

Binomial name
- Hymenoxys richardsonii (Hook.) Cockerell 1904

Synonyms
- Picradenia richardsonii Hook. 1833; Actinea richardsonii (Hook.) Kuntze; Actinella richardsonii (Hook.) Nutt.; Hymenoxys floribunda (A.Gray) Cockerell; Hymenoxys olivacea Cockerell

= Hymenoxys richardsonii =

Species of plant

Hymenoxys richardsonii, the pingue hymenoxys or pingue rubberweed, is a North American species of plants in the sunflower family. It is widespread across the western United States and western Canada from Arizona, New Mexico, and western Texas north as far as Alberta and Saskatchewan.

Varieties

- Hymenoxys richardsonii var. floribunda (A.Gray) K.F.Parker – Arizona, Colorado, New Mexico, Texas, Utah
- Hymenoxys richardsonii var. richardsonii – Alberta, Saskatchewan, Colorado, Montana, North Dakota, Utah, Wyoming

== Uses ==
Among the Zuni people of New Mexico, a poultice of the chewed root applied to sores and rashes, and an infusion of the root is used for stomachache.
