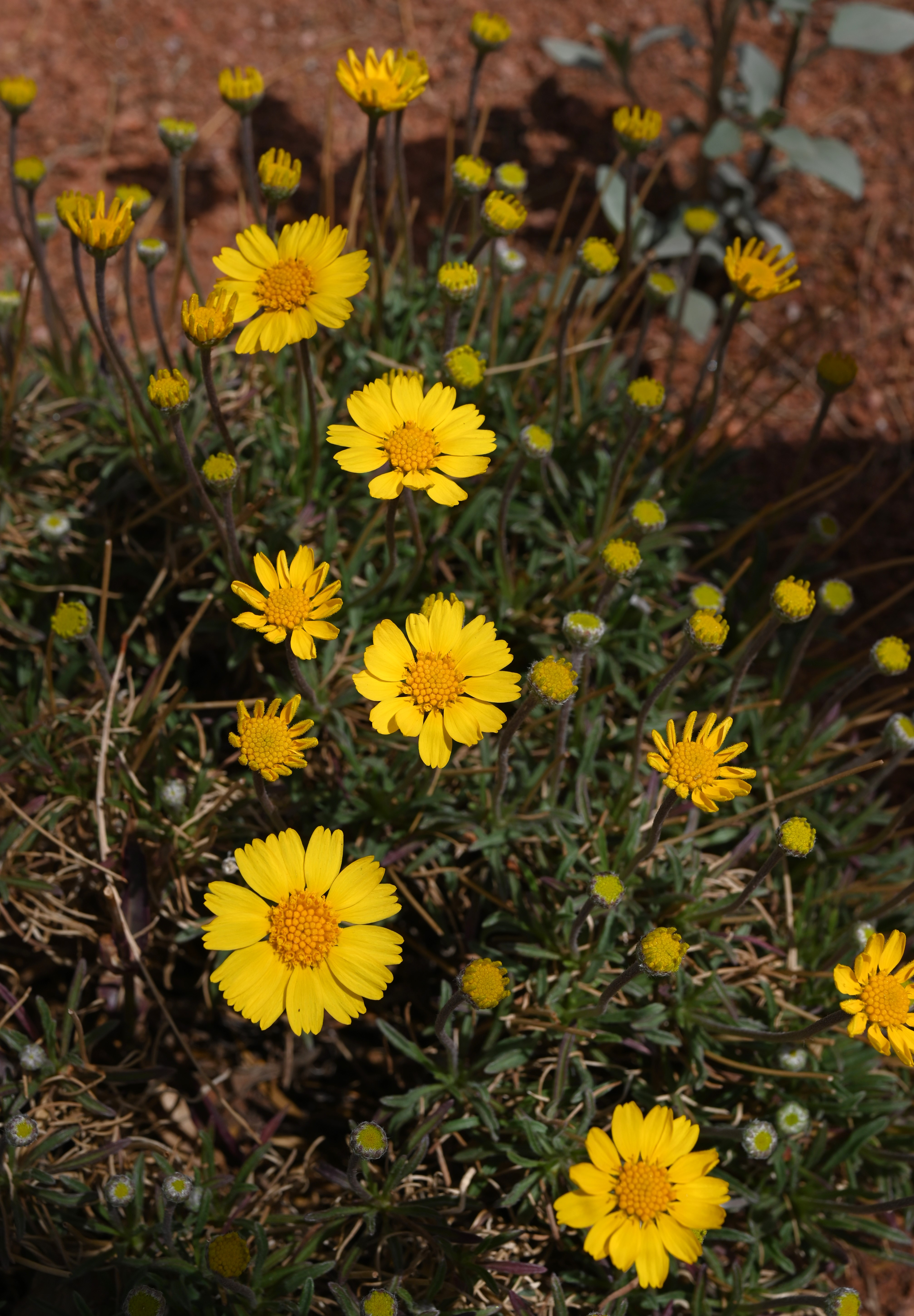

Conservation status
- Apparently Secure (NatureServe)

Scientific classification
- Kingdom: Plantae
- Clade: Tracheophytes
- Clade: Angiosperms
- Clade: Eudicots
- Clade: Asterids
- Order: Asterales
- Family: Asteraceae
- Genus: Tetraneuris
- Species: T. scaposa

Binomial name
- Tetraneuris scaposa (DC.) Greene 1898

Synonyms
- Synonymy: Cephalophora scaposa DC. 1836; Actinea angustifolia (Rydb.) A.Nelson; Actinea linearis (Greene) A.Nelson; Actinea scaposa (DC.) Kuntze; Actinella fastigiata (Greene) A.Nelson; Actinella glabra Nutt.; Actinella lanuginosa Buckley; Actinella linearis (Nutt.) A.Nelson; Actinella scaposa (DC.) Nutt.; Gaillardia roemeriana Scheele; Hymenoxys glabra (Nutt.) Shinners; Hymenoxys scaposa (DC.) K.F.Parker; Picradenia scaposa (DC.) Britton; Ptilepida scaposa (DC.) Britton; Tetraneuris angustata Greene; Tetraneuris angustifolia Rydb.; Tetraneuris fastigiata Greene; Tetraneuris glabra (Nutt.) Greene; Tetraneuris linearis (Nutt.) Greene; Tetraneuris stenophylla Rydb.

= Tetraneuris scaposa =

Species of flowering plant

Tetraneuris scaposa (common names stemmy four-nerve daisy and stemmy hymenoxys) is a North American species of flowering plant in the sunflower family. It is native to the southwestern and south-central United States (Nebraska, Kansas, Oklahoma, Texas, New Mexico, Arizona, Utah, and Colorado) and northern Mexico (Chihuahua, Coahuila, Nuevo León, Tamaulipas, San Luis Potosí, and Zacatecas).

Tetraneuris scaposa is a perennial herb up to 40 cm (16 inches) tall. It forms a branching underground caudex sometimes producing as many as 100 above-ground stems. Leaves are concentrated low on the stem, close to the ground. Flower heads can either be present individually one per stem, or multiply in tight clumps. Each head has 12–26 ray flowers surrounding 25–180 disc flowers.

== Uses ==
The Zuni people use an infusion of it as an eyewash. The Zuni believe that this eyewash is not for people with a "bad heart".
