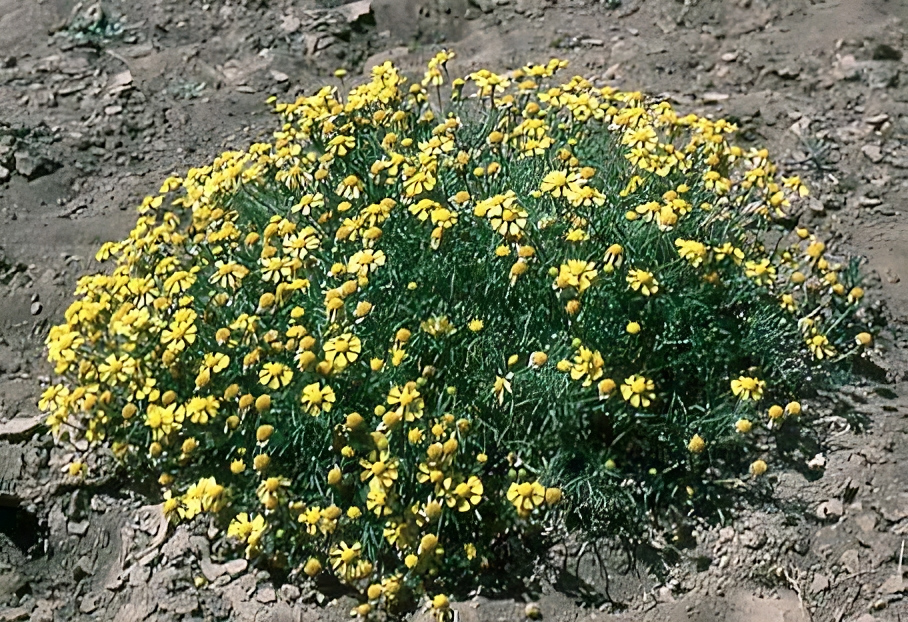

Conservation status
- Secure (NatureServe)

Scientific classification
- Kingdom: Plantae
- Clade: Tracheophytes
- Clade: Angiosperms
- Clade: Eudicots
- Clade: Asterids
- Order: Asterales
- Family: Asteraceae
- Genus: Hymenoxys
- Species: H. odorata

Binomial name
- Hymenoxys odorata DC. 1836

Synonyms
- Actinea odorata Kuntze; Actinella odorata (DC.) A. Gray; Picradenia odorata (DC.) Britton; Ptilepida odorata (DC.) Britton

= Hymenoxys odorata =

Species of flowering plant

Hymenoxys odorata is a species of flowering plant in the daisy family known by the common names bitter rubberweed and western bitterweed. It is native to the southwestern and south-central United States from southern California to Texas north as far as Kansas and Colorado, as well as northern Mexico (Chihuahua, Coahuila, Durango, Nuevo León, San Luis Potosí, Sonora, Tamaulipas). It grows in dry regions.

Hymenoxys odorata is an annual herb producing a branching stem up to 60 centimeters (2 feet) tall. The stems are covered in a foliage of short leaves which are divided into narrow, pointed lobes. Each of the many flower heads contains 50–150 bright yellow disc florets and 8–13 short yellow ray florets.

Hymenoxys odorata is poisonous to livestock; it is mostly a problem of the sheep industry. The toxic compounds are sesquiterpene lactones called hymenovin and hymenoxon. When ingested by sheep the plant produces inflammation of the stomach, renal necrosis, and toxic hepatitis, as well as inhibition of clotting factors. An ill sheep may be bloated, anorexic, weak, drooling, and vomiting. Acute and chronic, cumulative poisoning is often fatal. Sheep tend to avoid the plant because they find it distasteful but they will eat it in the absence of other forage.
