= Lupinus odoratus =

Scientific classification
- Kingdom: Plantae
- Clade: Tracheophytes
- Clade: Angiosperms
- Clade: Eudicots
- Clade: Rosids
- Order: Fabales
- Family: Fabaceae
- Subfamily: Faboideae
- Genus: Lupinus
- Species: L. odoratus

Binomial name
- Lupinus odoratus A.Heller

Species of legume

Lupinus odoratus is a species of lupine known by the common name Mojave lupine. It is native to the Mojave Desert and adjacent western Great Basin in the United States, where it grows in sandy or gravelly soils in open habitat.

It is an annual herb growing 10 to 30 centimeters tall. Each palmate leaf is made up of 7 to 9 green leaflets up to 2 centimeters long. The herbage is generally hairless except for new growth.

The inflorescence is an upright spiral of many flowers each up to a centimeter long. The flowers are royal purple-blue in color with a white spot on their banners, and have a scent similar to that of violets. The fruit is a thin legume pod up to 2 centimeters in length.
