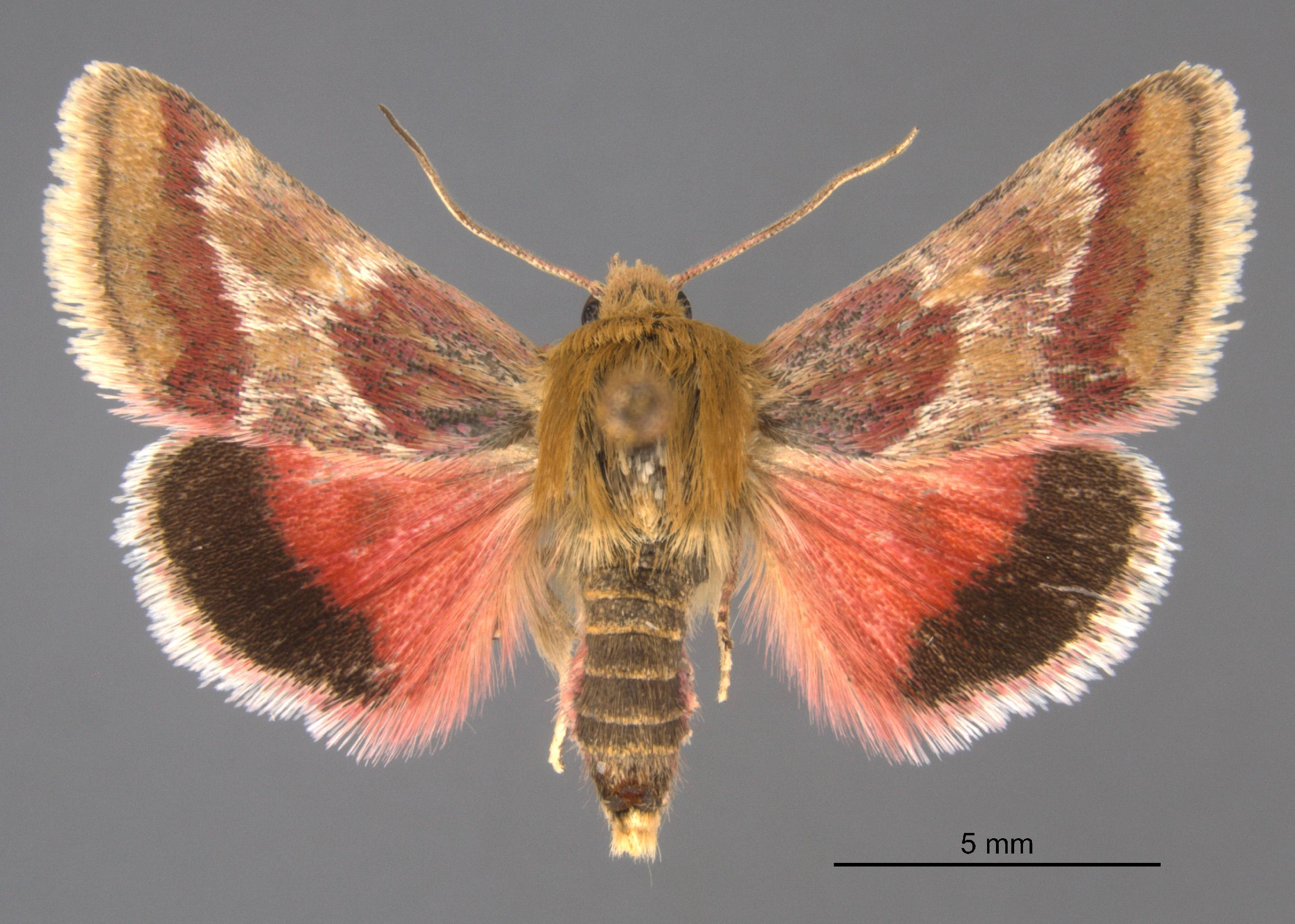

Scientific classification
- Domain: Eukaryota
- Kingdom: Animalia
- Phylum: Arthropoda
- Class: Insecta
- Order: Lepidoptera
- Superfamily: Noctuoidea
- Family: Noctuidae
- Genus: Schinia
- Species: S. roseitincta

Binomial name
- Schinia roseitincta Harvey, 1875

= Schinia roseitincta =

Species of moth

Schinia roseitincta is a moth of the family Noctuidae first described by Leon F. Harvey in 1875. It is found in the northern United States and in Canada.

The wingspan is approximately 20 mm.

The larvae feed on Tetraneuris acaulis.
