= G. acaulis =

G. acaulis may refer to:

- Gaillardia acaulis, a rubberweed species in the genus Gaillardia
- Gentiana acaulis, a small gentian species
- Gesneria acaulis, a woody shrub species in the genus Gesneria
