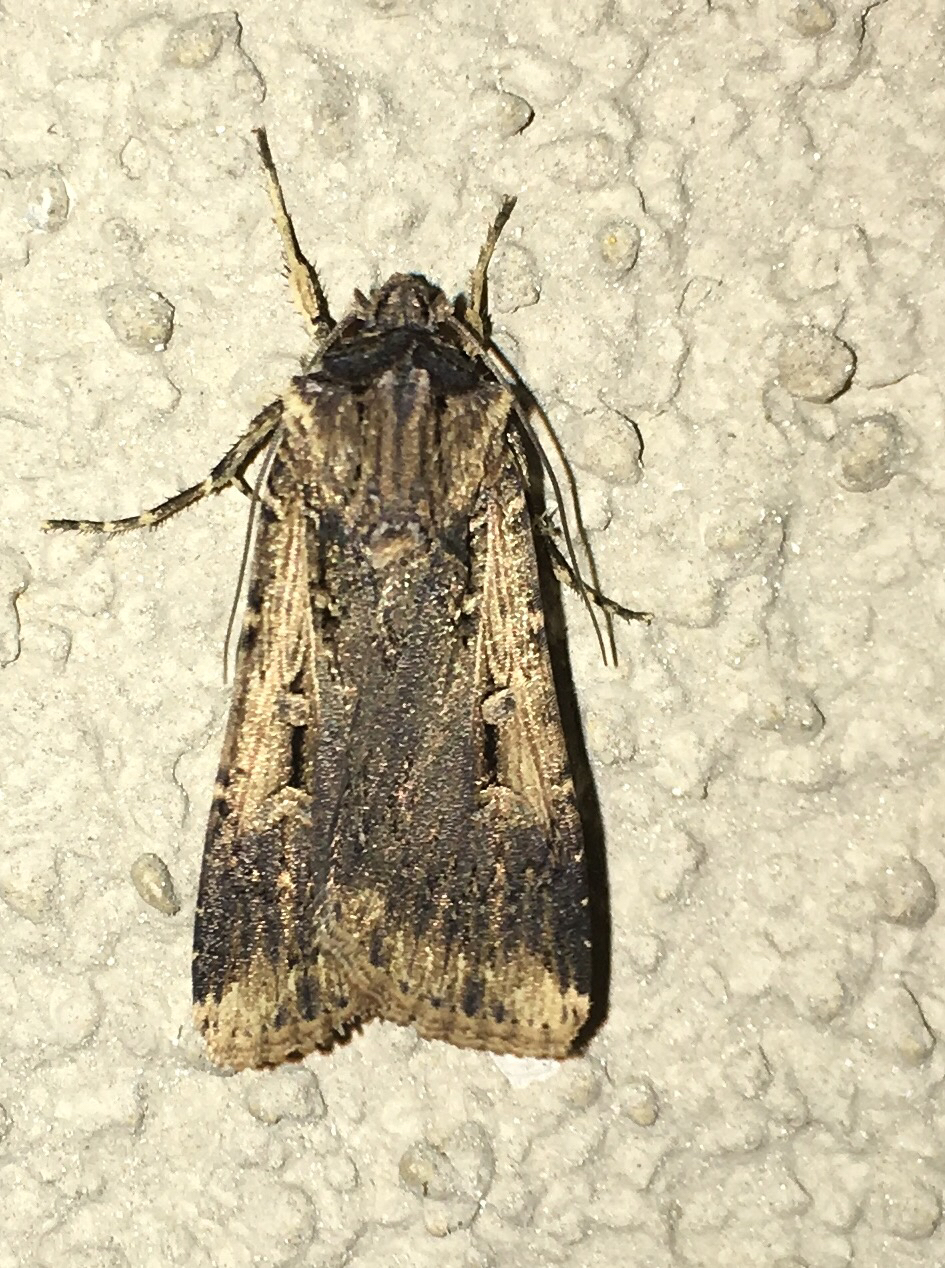

Scientific classification
- Kingdom: Animalia
- Phylum: Arthropoda
- Clade: Pancrustacea
- Class: Insecta
- Order: Lepidoptera
- Superfamily: Noctuoidea
- Family: Noctuidae
- Genus: Agrotis
- Species: A. volubilis

Binomial name
- Agrotis volubilis Harvey, 1874

= Agrotis volubilis =

Voluble dart moth

Species of moth

Agrotis volubilis, the voluble dart moth, is a moth of the family Noctuidae. The species was first described by Leon F. Harvey in 1874. It is found in North America, from Newfoundland to British Columbia in Canada and in the United States from Maine to Florida and west to the West Coast.

The wingspan is 35–40 mm. Adults are on wing from May to July. There is one generation per year.

The larvae feed on a wide range of plants, including Medicago sativa, Phaseolus, Cerastium, Trifolium, Zea mays, Hordeum pusillum and Nicotiana.

== Subspecies ==
- Agrotis volubilis volubilis
- Agrotis volubilis fumipennis
