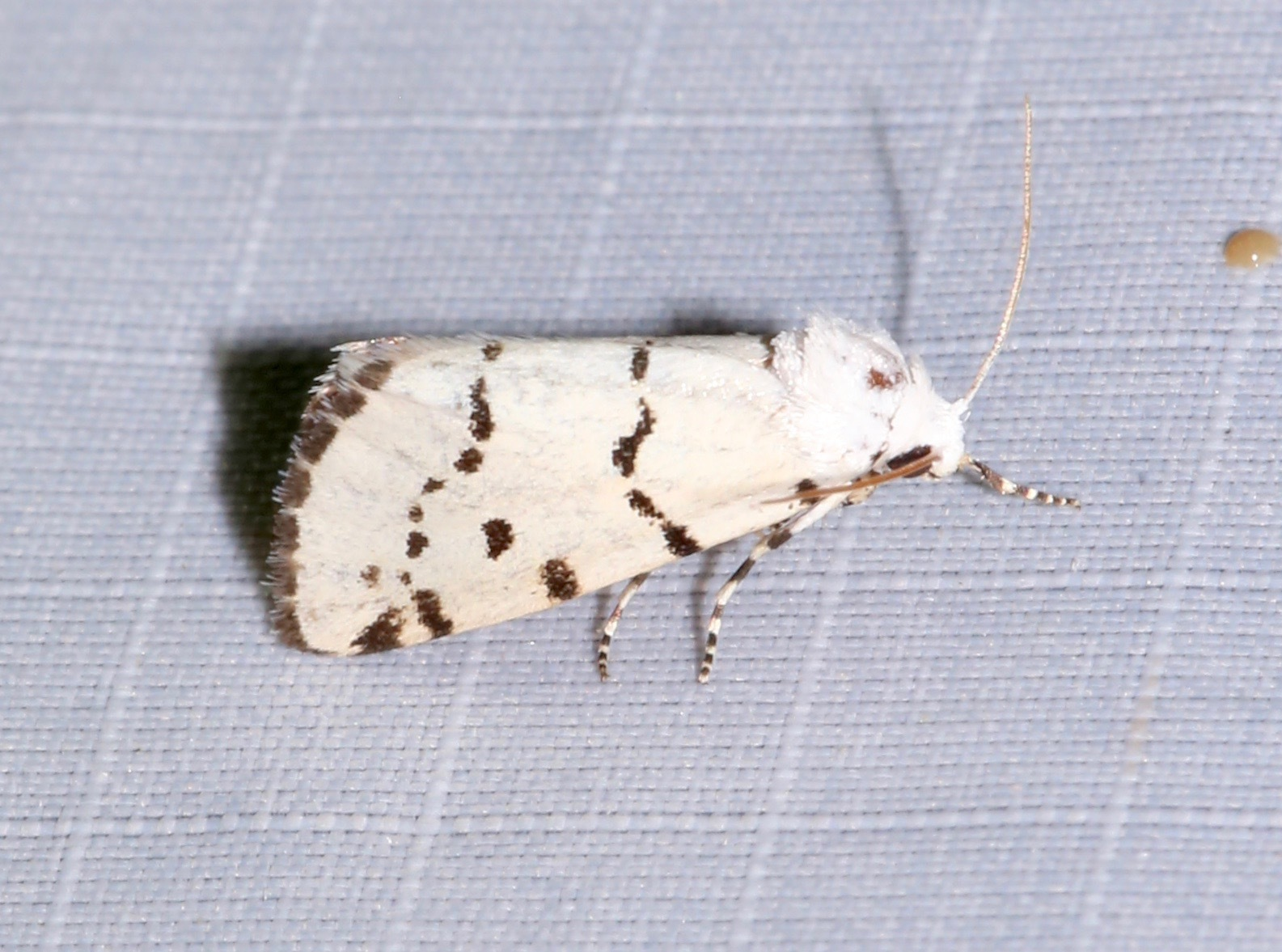
- Grotella binda, Arizona

Scientific classification
- Domain: Eukaryota
- Kingdom: Animalia
- Phylum: Arthropoda
- Class: Insecta
- Order: Lepidoptera
- Superfamily: Noctuoidea
- Family: Noctuidae
- Subfamily: Grotellinae
- Genus: Grotella; Harvey, 1875

= Grotella =

Genus of moths

Grotella is a genus of moths of the family Noctuidae first described by Leon F. Harvey in 1875.

== Species ==
- Grotella binda Barnes, 1907
- Grotella blanca Barnes, 1904
- Grotella blanchardi McElvare, 1966
- Grotella citronella Barnes & McDunnough, 1916
- Grotella dis Grote, 1883
- Grotella grisescens (Barnes & McDunnough, 1910)
- Grotella harveyi Barnes & Benjamin, 1922
- Grotella margueritaria Blanchard, 1968
- Grotella melanocrypta (Dyar, 1912)
- Grotella olivacea Barnes & McDunnough, 1911
- Grotella parvipuncta Barnes & McDunnough, 1912
- Grotella pyronaea Druce, 1895
- Grotella sampita Barnes, 1907
- Grotella septempunctata Harvey, 1875
- Grotella soror Barnes & McDunnough, 1912
- Grotella stretchi Barnes & Benjamin, 1922
- Grotella tricolor Barnes, 1904
- Grotella vagans Barnes & Benjamin, 1922
- Grotella vauriae McElvare, 1950
