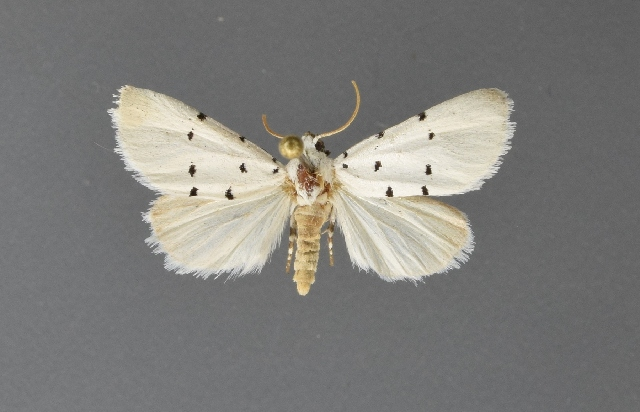

Scientific classification
- Domain: Eukaryota
- Kingdom: Animalia
- Phylum: Arthropoda
- Class: Insecta
- Order: Lepidoptera
- Superfamily: Noctuoidea
- Family: Noctuidae
- Genus: Grotella
- Species: G. septempunctata

Binomial name
- Grotella septempunctata Harvey, 1875

= Grotella septempunctata =

Species of moth

Grotella septempunctata is a moth in the genus Grotella, of the family Noctuidae. The species was first described by Leon F. Harvey in 1875. It can be found in North America, from Texas to Colorado.

The wingspan is about 21 mm.

== Description ==
The noctuid species, G. septempunctata, has a pure white head and thorax with an abdomen brown, tinged with a yellowish white. The palpi and frons are black brown and the antennae are yellow. Tibiae and tarsi banded with black; forewing almost pure white; the costal edge black towards base; subbasal black points below costa and cell; small antemedial black spots on costa, in submedian fold, and on inner margin, the spot in the fold slightly nearer the base; small postmedial black spots on costa, discocellulars, in submedian fold and on inner margin. Hindwing white, the apical area to the discocellulars and vein 3 tinged with fuscous brown. Underside of forewing, except the inner area and cilia, and the costal area of hindwing fuscous brown.
