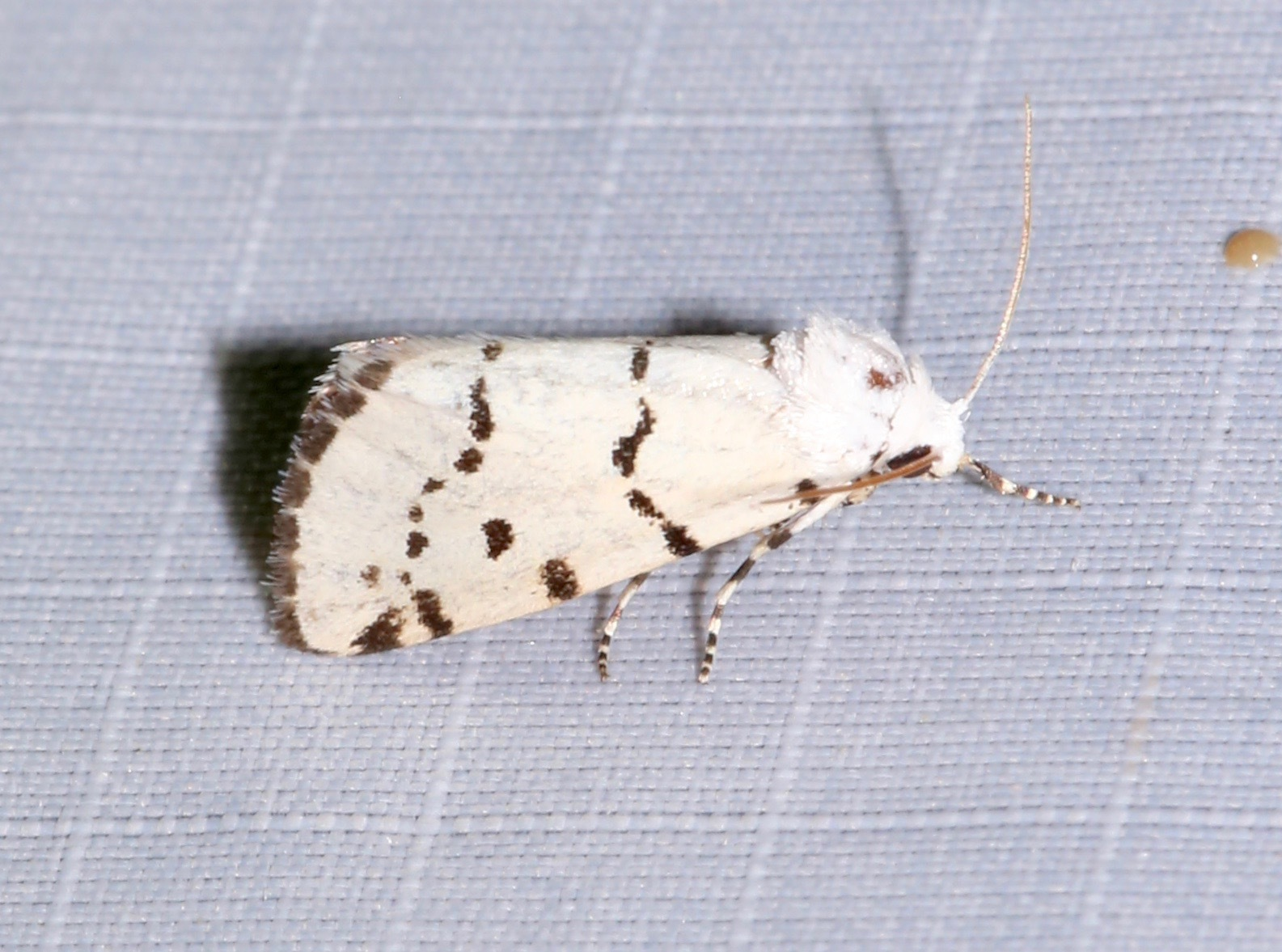
- Grotella binda, Arizona

Scientific classification
- Domain: Eukaryota
- Kingdom: Animalia
- Phylum: Arthropoda
- Class: Insecta
- Order: Lepidoptera
- Superfamily: Noctuoidea
- Family: Noctuidae
- Subfamily: Grotellinae

= Grotellinae =

Subfamily of moths

Grotellinae is a subfamily of owlet moths in the family Noctuidae. There are about 5 genera and more than 20 described species in Grotellinae. They are found primarily in North and Central America, and are common in the southwestern United States.

As a result of phylogenetic research published in 2019, the subfamily Grotellinae was established when Grotellina, a subtribe of Stiriini, was elevated in rank to subfamily.

== Genera ==
These five genera belong to the subfamily Grotellinae:

- Grotella Harvey, 1875
- Grotellaforma Barnes & Benjamin, 1922
- Hemigrotella Barnes & McDunnough, 1918
- Neogrotella Barnes & Benjamin, 1922
- Podagra Smith, 1902
