= G. tricolor =

G. tricolor may refer to:

- Gilia tricolor, the bird's-eye gilia, an annual plant species native to California
- Grotella tricolor, a moth species found in California and Arizona

== See also ==
- Tricolor (disambiguation)
