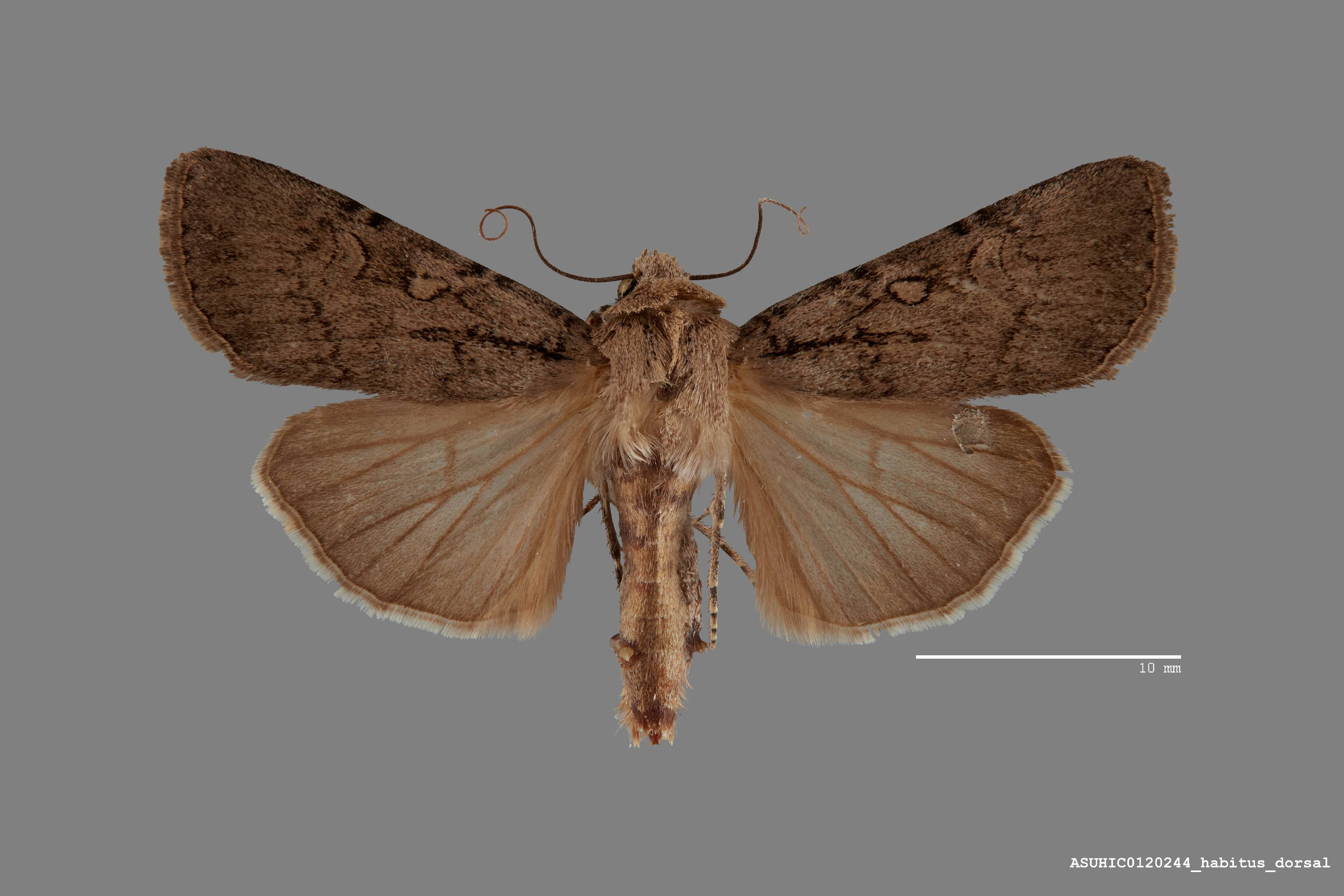

Scientific classification
- Domain: Eukaryota
- Kingdom: Animalia
- Phylum: Arthropoda
- Class: Insecta
- Order: Lepidoptera
- Superfamily: Noctuoidea
- Family: Noctuidae
- Genus: Euxoa
- Species: E. choris

Binomial name
- Euxoa choris (Harvey, 1876)

Synonyms
- Agrotis choris Harvey, 1876; Agrotis cogitans Smith, 1890; Agrotis achor Strecker, 1899

= Euxoa choris =

Species of moth

Euxoa choris is a moth of the family Noctuidae first described by Leon F. Harvey in 1876. It is found in North America from south-western Saskatchewan, central Alberta and south-central Yukon, south to New Mexico, Arizona and California.

The wingspan is 41–43 mm. Adults are on wing from June to August. There is one generation per year.
