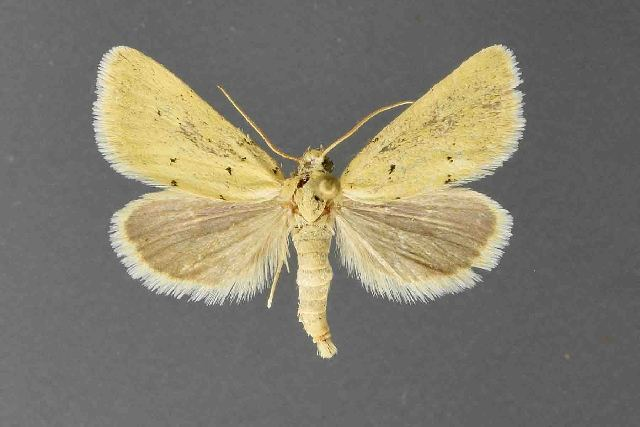

Scientific classification
- Kingdom: Animalia
- Phylum: Arthropoda
- Class: Insecta
- Order: Lepidoptera
- Superfamily: Noctuoidea
- Family: Noctuidae
- Genus: Grotella
- Species: G. citronella

Binomial name
- Grotella citronella Barnes & McDunnough, 1916

= Grotella citronella =

Species of moth

Grotella citronella is a species of moth in the genus Grotella, of the family Noctuidae. This moth is found in North America, including the Mojave Desert region of California. This species was first described by William Barnes and James Halliday McDunnough in 1916.

== Identification ==
Grotella citronella is primarily a yellow-cream color.
