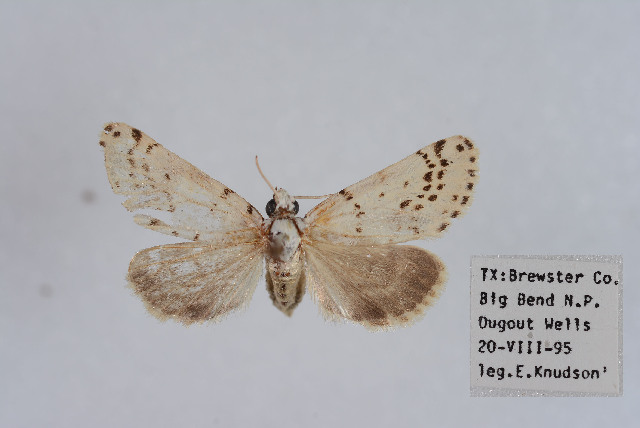

Scientific classification
- Domain: Eukaryota
- Kingdom: Animalia
- Phylum: Arthropoda
- Class: Insecta
- Order: Lepidoptera
- Superfamily: Noctuoidea
- Family: Noctuidae
- Genus: Grotella
- Species: G. margueritaria

Binomial name
- Grotella margueritaria Blanchard, 1968

= Grotella margueritaria =

Species of moth

Grotella margueritaria is a moth in the family Noctuidae. The species was first described by André Blanchard in 1968. This moth species is found in North America, including Texas, its type location.

The wingspan is 26–27 mm (1.0–1.1 in).
