= Grotella vagans =

Scientific classification
- Domain: Eukaryota
- Kingdom: Animalia
- Phylum: Arthropoda
- Class: Insecta
- Order: Lepidoptera
- Superfamily: Noctuoidea
- Family: Noctuidae
- Genus: Grotella
- Species: G. vagans

Binomial name
- Grotella vagans Barnes & Benjamin, 1922

Species of moth

Grotella vagans is a species of moth in the genus Grotella, of the family Noctuidae. This moth species was first described by William Barnes and Foster Hendrickson Benjamin in 1922. It is found in North America, including Nevada, its type location.
