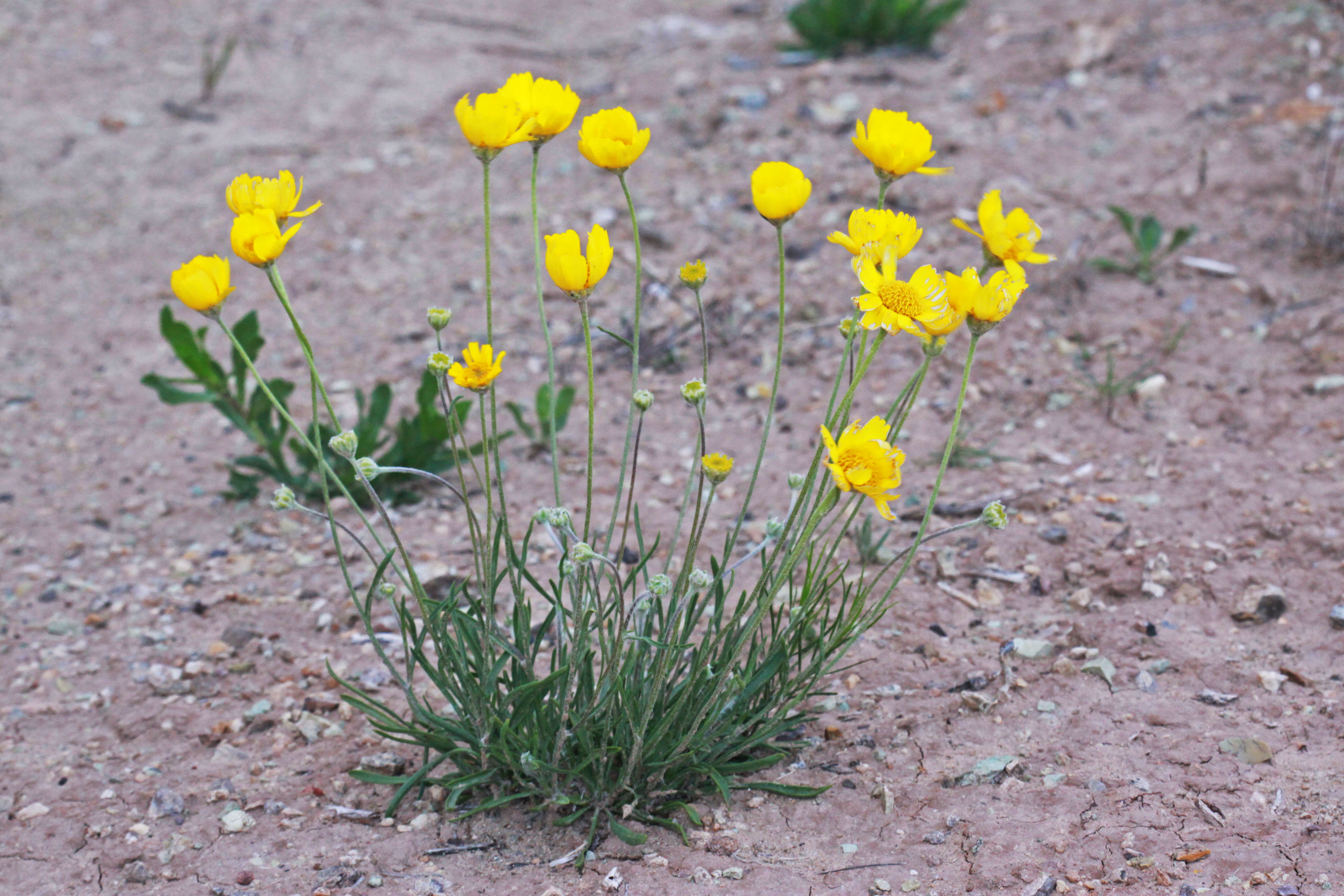

Conservation status
- Secure (NatureServe)

Scientific classification
- Kingdom: Plantae
- Clade: Tracheophytes
- Clade: Angiosperms
- Clade: Eudicots
- Clade: Asterids
- Order: Asterales
- Family: Asteraceae
- Genus: Tetraneuris
- Species: T. ivesiana

Binomial name
- Tetraneuris ivesiana Greene 1898

Synonyms
- Synonymy: Actinea leptoclada var. ivesiana (Greene) J.F. Macbr.; Hymenoxys acaulis var. ivesiana (Greene) K.F. Parker; Hymenoxys argentea var. ivesiana (Greene) Cronquist; Hymenoxys ivesiana (Greene) K.F. Parker; Tetraneuris intermedia Greene; Tetraneuris mancosensis A.Nelson; Tetraneuris pilosa Greene

= Tetraneuris ivesiana =

Species of flowering plant

Tetraneuris ivesiana is a North American species of flowering plant in the sunflower family, known by the common name Ives' fournerved daisy. It grows in the southwestern United States, in Arizona, New Mexico, Utah, and Colorado.

T. ivesiana is a perennial herb up to 26 cm (10 in) tall. It forms a branching underground caudex sometimes producing as many as 30 above-ground stems. One plant can produce as many as 30 flower heads. Each head has 7–10 yellow ray flowers surrounding 40–150 yellow disc flowers.
