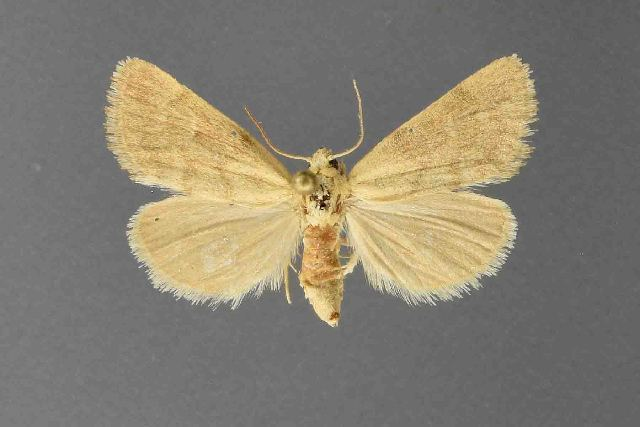

Scientific classification
- Domain: Eukaryota
- Kingdom: Animalia
- Phylum: Arthropoda
- Class: Insecta
- Order: Lepidoptera
- Superfamily: Noctuoidea
- Family: Noctuidae
- Genus: Grotella
- Species: G. olivacea

Binomial name
- Grotella olivacea Barnes & McDunnough, 1911

= Grotella olivacea =

Species of moth

Grotella olivacea is a moth in the genus Grotella, of the family Noctuidae. The species was first described by William Barnes and James Halliday McDunnough in 1911. This moth species is found in North America, including New Mexico, its type location.
