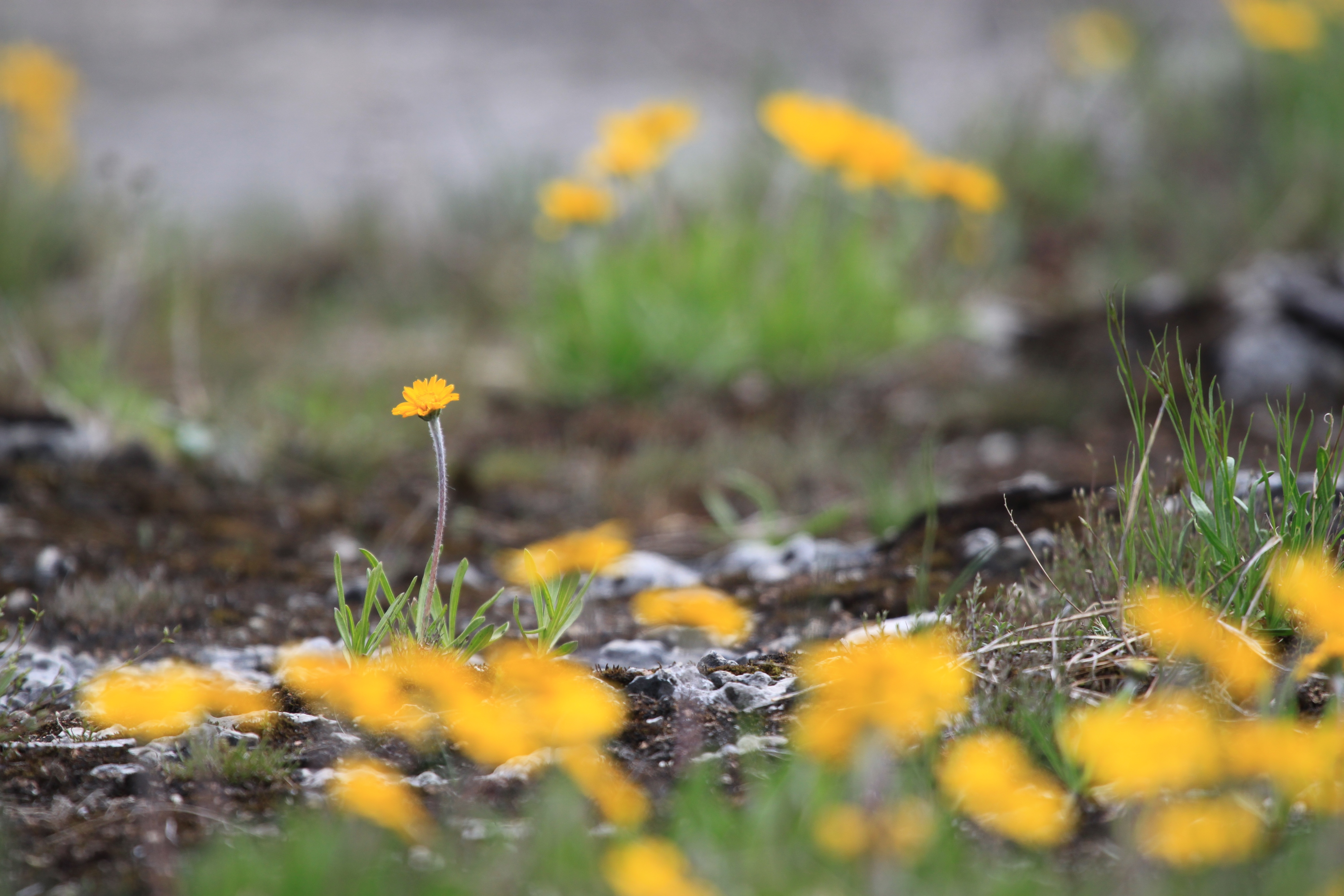

Conservation status
- Vulnerable (NatureServe)

Scientific classification
- Kingdom: Plantae
- Clade: Tracheophytes
- Clade: Angiosperms
- Clade: Eudicots
- Clade: Asterids
- Order: Asterales
- Family: Asteraceae
- Genus: Tetraneuris
- Species: T. herbacea

Binomial name
- Tetraneuris herbacea Greene 1898

Synonyms
- Actinea herbacea (Greene) B.L.Rob.; Actinella scaposa var. glabra A.Gray; Hymenoxys acaulis var. glabra (A.Gray) K.F.Parker; Hymenoxys herbacea (Greene) Cusick; Hymenoxys herbacea (Greene) Cronquist

= Tetraneuris herbacea =

Species of flowering plant

Tetraneuris herbacea is a rare species of flowering plant in the aster family known by the common names eastern fournerved daisy, lakeside daisy, fournerved starflower, and Manitoulin gold. It is native to and endemic to the Great Lakes region in North America, where it is present in Ontario, Ohio, Michigan, and Illinois. It is threatened by habitat destruction and degradation by several forces, including limestone quarrying, recreational activity, fire suppression, and construction. It is a federally listed threatened species of the United States and of Canada.

== Description ==
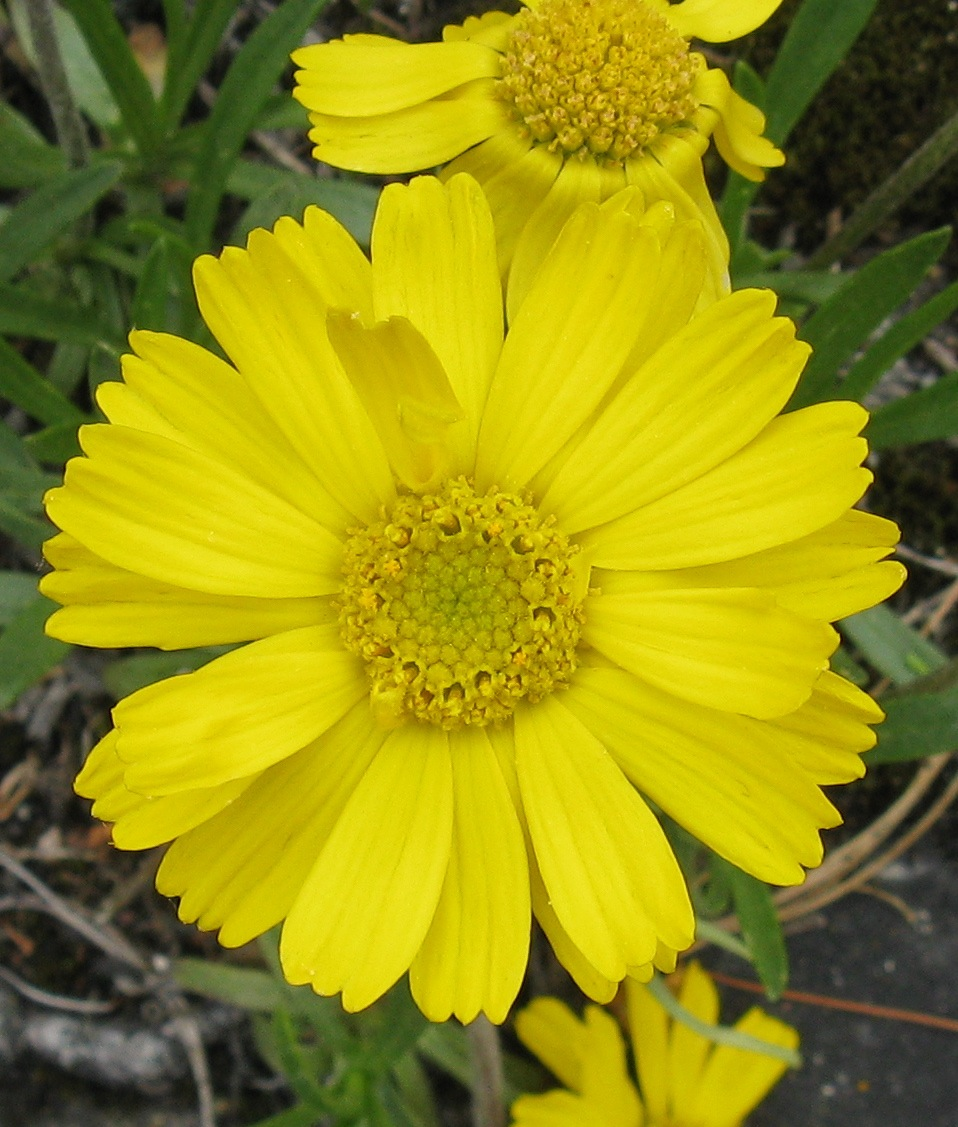

Tetraneuris herbacea is a perennial herb growing from a branching caudex with one or more erect stems measuring 6 to about 35 centimeters (2.4-14.0 inches) tall. The leaves are located around the base of the plant and have rubbery, glandular blades. The inflorescence is a single flower head borne on a hairy peduncle. The head contains 50-250 yellow disc florets surrounded by 7-27 (occasionally 0) yellow ray florets each ray measuring 1 or 2 centimeters (0.4-0.8) in length. The fruit is an achene tipped with a pappus of scales.

== Ecology ==
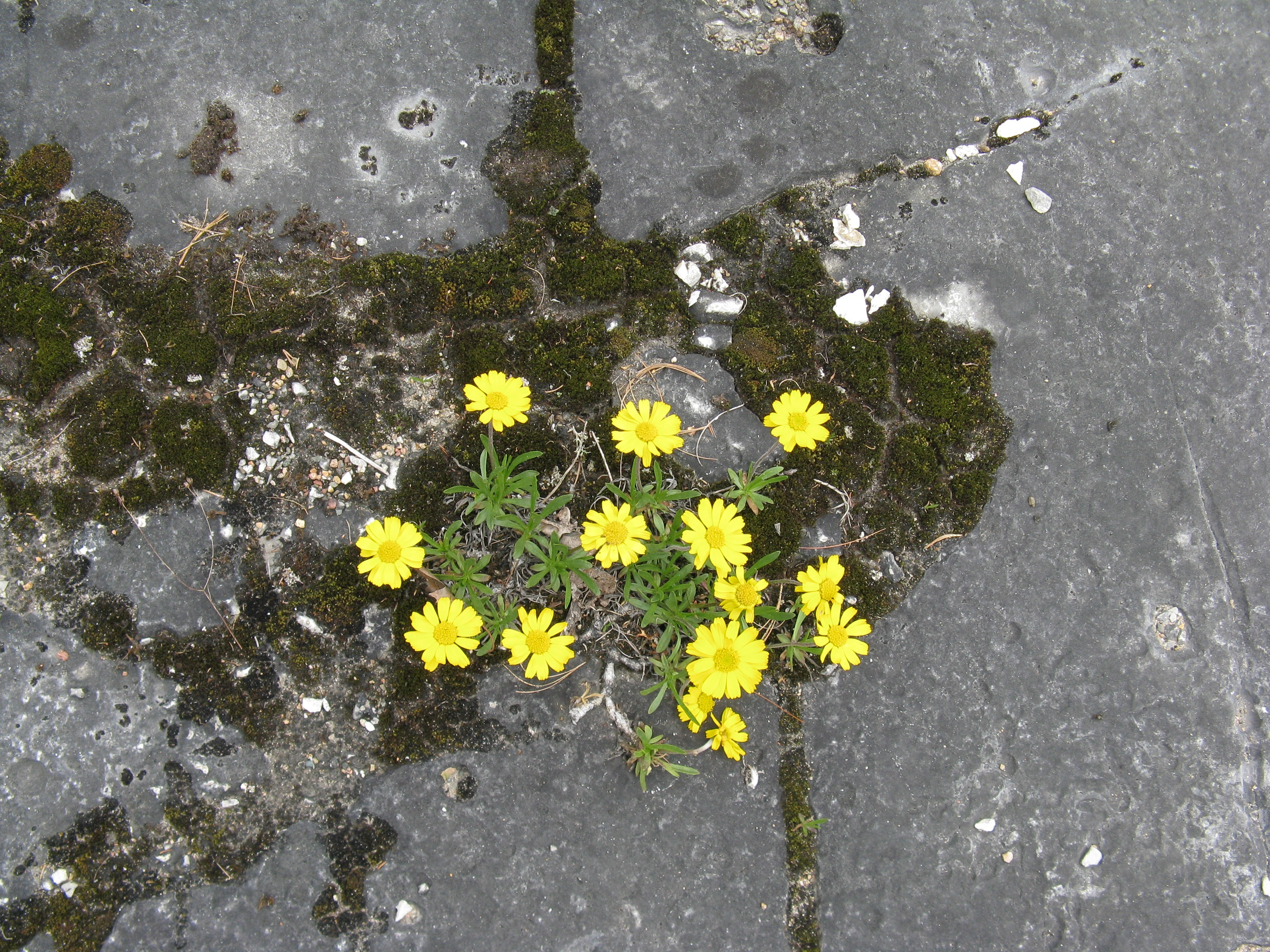

Tetraneuris herbacea is known from just a few natural and introduced populations. In Ontario there are about 20 populations all located at the shores of Lake Huron on the Bruce Peninsula and Manitoulin Island. In Ohio, the plant only occurs naturally in Ottawa County, where it can be found at the Lakeside Daisy State Nature Preserve, a protected area named in its honor. There is an introduced population on Kelleys Island, Ohio, as well. In Illinois, naturally occurring lakeside daisies were last seen in 1981, and today the daisies occurring there are introduced populations in nature preserves. In Michigan there is one population in Mackinac County on the Upper Peninsula, which may or may not be naturally occurring.

Tetraneuris herbacea occurs on alvars, a type of limestone pavement with little plant cover. These rocky outcrops have thin, alkaline soils and are quite dry in the dry seasons, making them inhospitable for many other plant species, so the lakeside daisy grows in unshaded full sun. In Michigan the habitat is based on tufa and marl, different types of limestone substrate.

Tetraneuris herbacea is threatened by the loss of its habitat. The limestone plain where it grows naturally in Ohio, the largest population within the bounds of the United States, is privately owned by a quarrying company that mines the rock. The spoils of the quarry are dumped directly on top of clumps of the flower. Recreational activity such as the use of off-road vehicles damages the habitat. In some areas supporting the plant, lack of a natural fire regime allows ecological succession to occur in the nearly barren habitat, so that woody vegetation grows and blocks sunlight. The plant is limited to a rare type of habitat and its populations are small. Because each plant requires pollen from an unrelated individual in order to reproduce, small, widely spaced populations make reproduction difficult.

== Recovery efforts ==
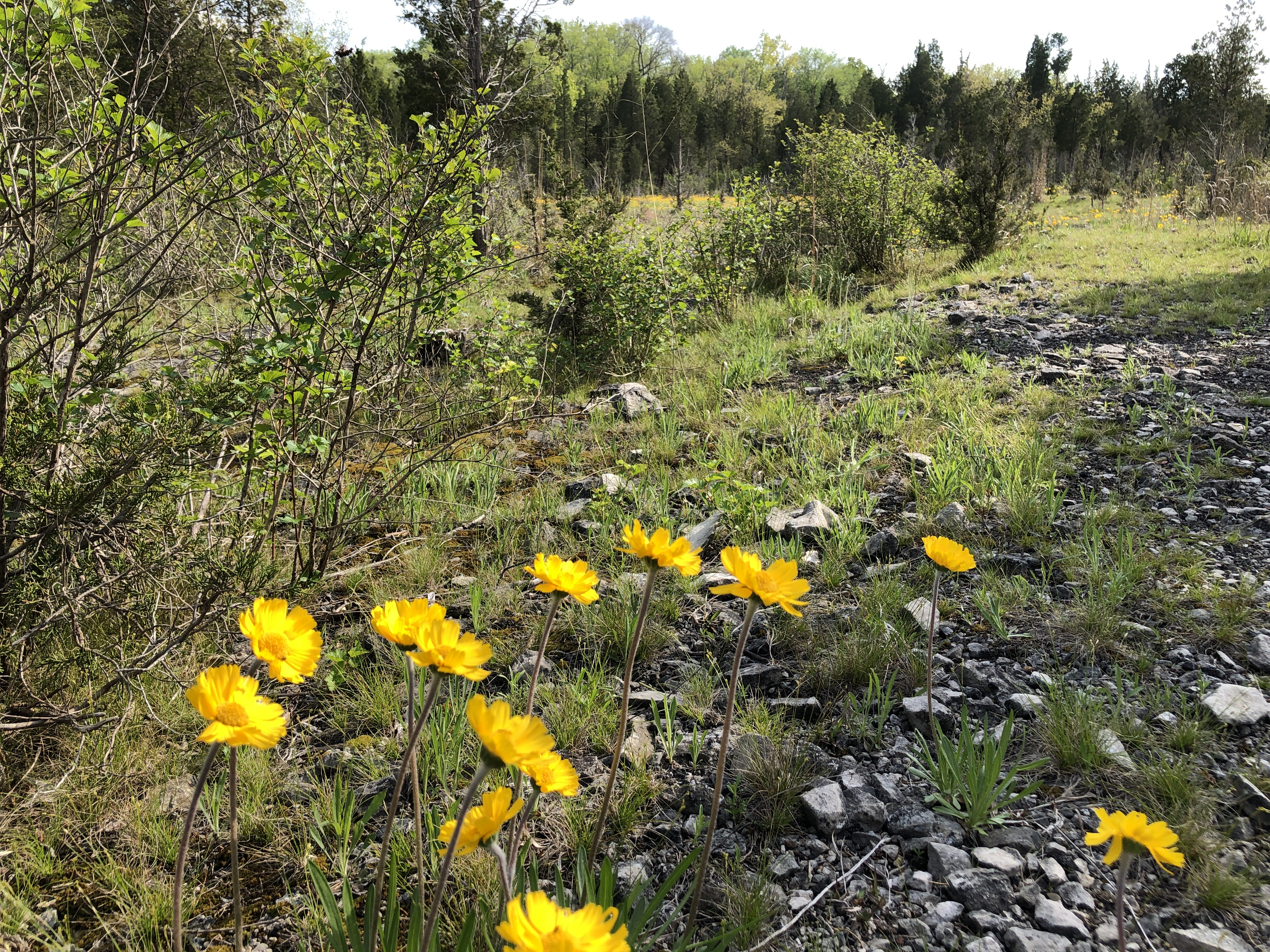
Lakeside Daisies on Kelleys Island

The USFWS 2016 final ruling as a part of its Five year Review of recovery efforts for the Lakeside Daisy identified threats to survival as habitat destruction, succession of competitive overgrowth by woody species, over-acting for gardens, inadequacy of existing regulatory mechanisms, and self-incompatibility. Since the Lakeside Daisy requires a strictly dry, limestone-based habitat, climate change is likely to have a significant impact on existing natural populations. As quarry operations continue in these habitats, the areas best suited for Lakeside Daisy growth will likely fill with water and develop into small lakes. These changes to the natural habitat, if unchecked, will eradicate some of the plant's most populated centers. Historically, alvar habitat cannot be unnaturally created, and even attempts to restore altered land have not led to successful, diverse ecosystems. In an effort to help nearby land be more suitable for the plant to expand, wooded areas specifically near the Ohio populations may require management and clearing. On a positive note, once a proper site is populated, competition with other species is limited since few other plants can thrive in the alvar ecosystems. Nonetheless, in recent years Lakeside Daisies have faced competition from native prairie plants, which often create a dense organic layer of soil. This presents a problem for the daisy by reducing sunlight and adding soil suitable for more competitive plants. Through observation as part of the Recovery Plan, bumble bees, small carpenter bees, and halictid bees have been recorded as pollinators for the daisy. A few other species of insects, including the Pearl Crescent butterfly have been found to pollinate Lakeside Daisy flowers. The role of these insects has been shown to be impactful, specifically with the smaller populations of the plant, in combatting the natural struggle with self-incompatibility. A 2007 study found that although the small populations of the Lakeside Daisy suffer from a lack of mates, they are more frequently visited by pollinating insects. Thus, despite population size, the Lakeside Daisy is rarely found to be pollen limited.
