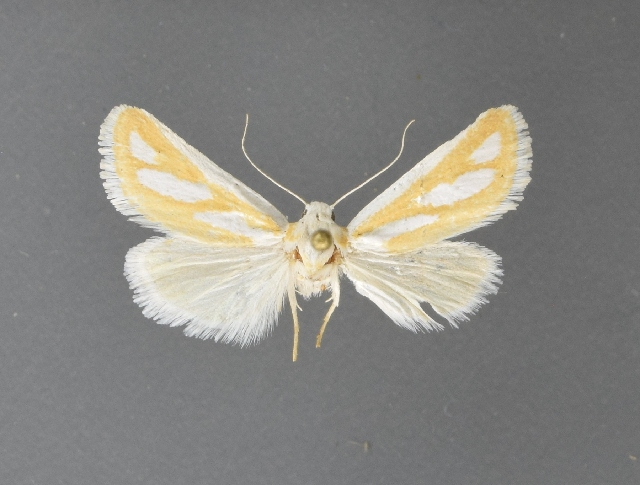
- Hemigrotella argenteostriata

Scientific classification
- Domain: Eukaryota
- Kingdom: Animalia
- Phylum: Arthropoda
- Class: Insecta
- Order: Lepidoptera
- Superfamily: Noctuoidea
- Family: Noctuidae
- Subfamily: Grotellinae
- Genus: Hemigrotella; Barnes & McDunnough, 1918
- Species: H. argenteostriata

Binomial name
- Hemigrotella argenteostriata Barnes & McDunnough, 1918

= Hemigrotella =

Genus of moths

Hemigrotella is a monotypic moth genus of the family Noctuidae. Its only species, Hemigrotella argenteostriata, is found in southern California. Both the genus and species were first described by William Barnes and James Halliday McDunnough in 1918.
