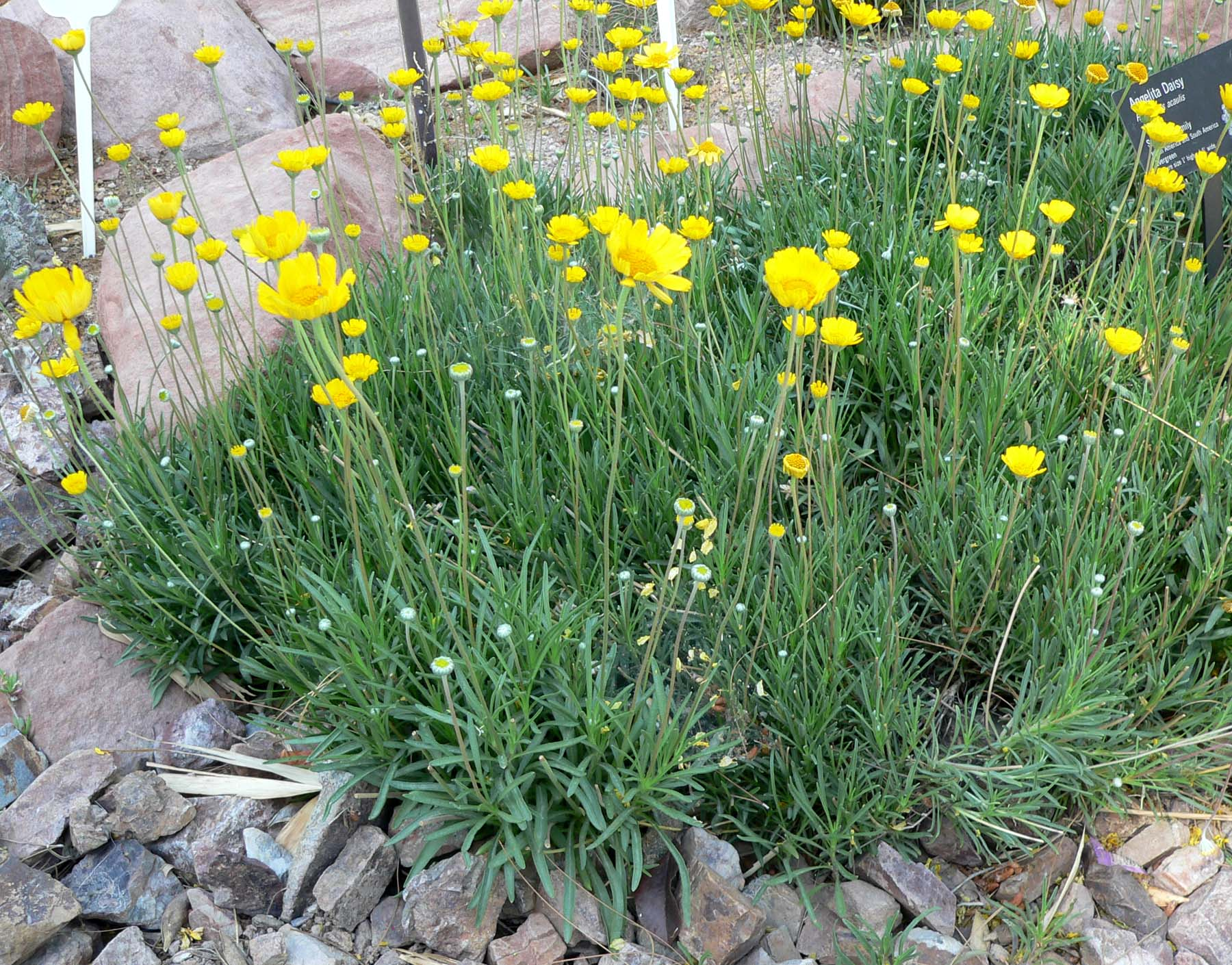
- Tetraneuris acaulis in cultivation

Scientific classification
- Kingdom: Plantae
- Clade: Tracheophytes
- Clade: Angiosperms
- Clade: Eudicots
- Clade: Asterids
- Order: Asterales
- Family: Asteraceae
- Subfamily: Asteroideae
- Tribe: Helenieae
- Subtribe: Tetraneurinae
- Genus: Tetraneuris; E.L.Greene 1898

Type species
- Tetraneuris acaulis (DC.) E.L.Greene 1898

Synonyms
- Rydbergia Greene

= Tetraneuris =

Genus of flowering plants

Tetraneuris, commonly known as four-nerve daisy or bitterweed, is a genus of North American plants in the sneezeweed tribe within the daisy family.

The genus includes one annual species, Tetraneuris linearifolia, with all the other species being perennials.

The name is of Greek origin, deriving from tetra, meaning "four", and neuron, meaning "nerve", which refers to the venation of the rays: three-lobed with the outer lobes themselves having an apparent vein down the middle.

Species

- Tetraneuris acaulis – western Canada, western USA, northern Mexico
- Tetraneuris argentea – Arizona, New Mexico
- Tetraneuris herbacea – Ontario, Michigan, Ohio, Illinois
- Tetraneuris ivesiana – Utah, Colorado, New Mexico, Arizona
- Tetraneuris linearifolia - Tamaulipas, Coahuila, Nuevo León, Kansas, Oklahoma, Texas, New Mexico
- Tetraneuris scaposa – Chihuahua, Tamaulipas, Coahuila, Nuevo León, San Luis Potosí, Zacatecas, Nebraska, Kansas, Oklahoma, Texas, Colorado, New Mexico
- Tetraneuris torreyana – Arizona, New Mexico, Utah, Colorado, Wyoming, Montana
- Tetraneuris turneri – Coahuila, Texas
- Tetraneuris verdiensis – Arizona

formerly included

see Hymenoxys

- Tetraneuris brandegeei - Hymenoxys brandegeei
- Tetraneuris grandiflora - Hymenoxys grandiflora
