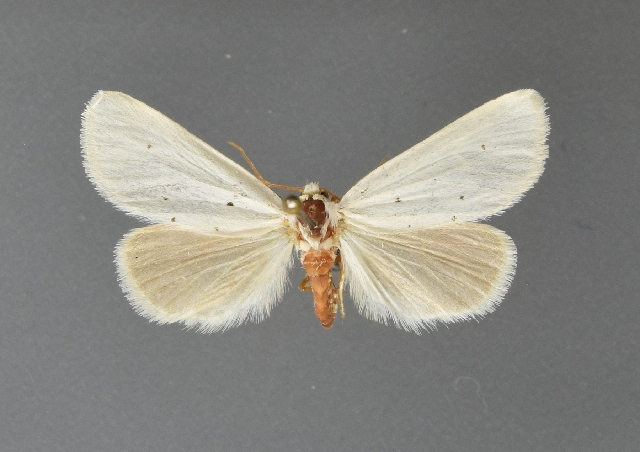

Scientific classification
- Kingdom: Animalia
- Phylum: Arthropoda
- Class: Insecta
- Order: Lepidoptera
- Superfamily: Noctuoidea
- Family: Noctuidae
- Genus: Grotella
- Species: G. parvipuncta

Binomial name
- Grotella parvipuncta Barnes & McDunnough, 1912

= Grotella parvipuncta =

Species of moth

Grotella parvipuncta is a moth in the genus Grotella, of the family Noctuidae. The species was first described by William Barnes and James Halliday McDunnough in 1912. This moth species is found in North America, including New Mexico, its type location.

The wingspan is about 22 mm.
