= Tetraneuris verdiensis =

Scientific classification
- Kingdom: Plantae
- Clade: Tracheophytes
- Clade: Angiosperms
- Clade: Eudicots
- Clade: Asterids
- Order: Asterales
- Family: Asteraceae
- Genus: Tetraneuris
- Species: T. verdiensis

Binomial name
- Tetraneuris verdiensis R.A.Denham & B.L.Turner 1996

Species of plant

Tetraneuris verdiensis is a rare North American species of plants in the sunflower family. It has been found in only in Yavapai County in Arizona in the southwestern United States.

Tetraneuris verdiensis is a small perennial herb rarely more than 15 cm (5.9 in) tall. It forms a branching underground caudex sometimes producing as many as 15 unbranched, above-ground stems. The plant generally produces one flower head per stem. Each head 20-40 yellow disc flowers but no ray flowers.
