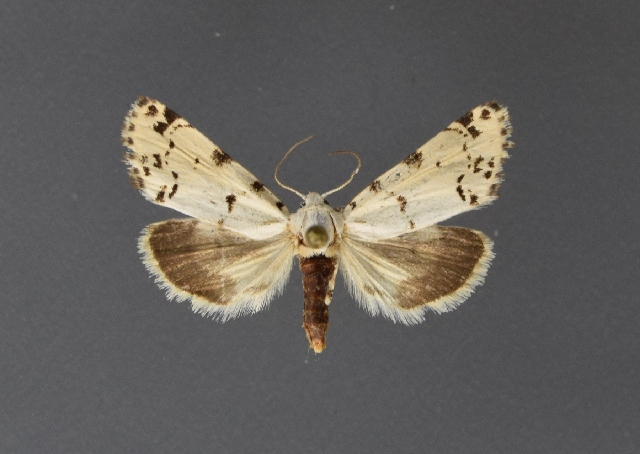

Scientific classification
- Domain: Eukaryota
- Kingdom: Animalia
- Phylum: Arthropoda
- Class: Insecta
- Order: Lepidoptera
- Superfamily: Noctuoidea
- Family: Noctuidae
- Genus: Grotella
- Species: G. soror

Binomial name
- Grotella soror Barnes & McDunnough, 1912

= Grotella soror =

Species of moth

Grotella soror is a moth in the genus Grotella, of the family Noctuidae. The species was first described by William Barnes and James Halliday McDunnough in 1912. It is found in North America, including Arizona, its type location.
