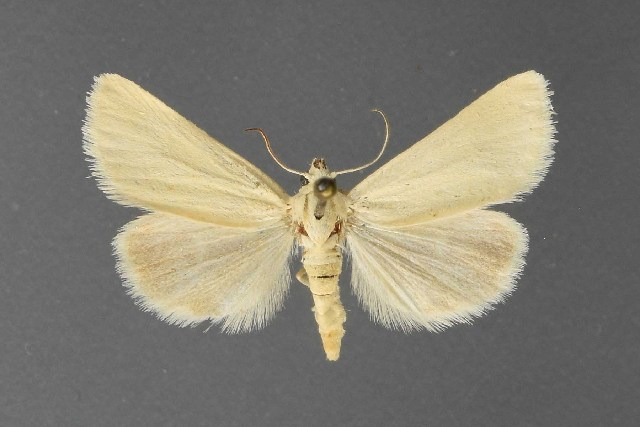
- Neogrotella confusa

Scientific classification
- Kingdom: Animalia
- Phylum: Arthropoda
- Clade: Pancrustacea
- Class: Insecta
- Order: Lepidoptera
- Superfamily: Noctuoidea
- Family: Noctuidae
- Subfamily: Grotellinae
- Genus: Neogrotella; Barnes & Benjamin, 1922

= Neogrotella =

Genus of moths

Neogrotella is a genus of moths of the family Noctuidae erected by William Barnes and Foster Hendrickson Benjamin in 1922.

== Species ==
- Neogrotella confusa Barnes & Benjamin, 1922
- Neogrotella macdunnoughi Barnes & Benjamin, 1922
- Neogrotella spaldingi (Barnes & McDunnough, 1913)
