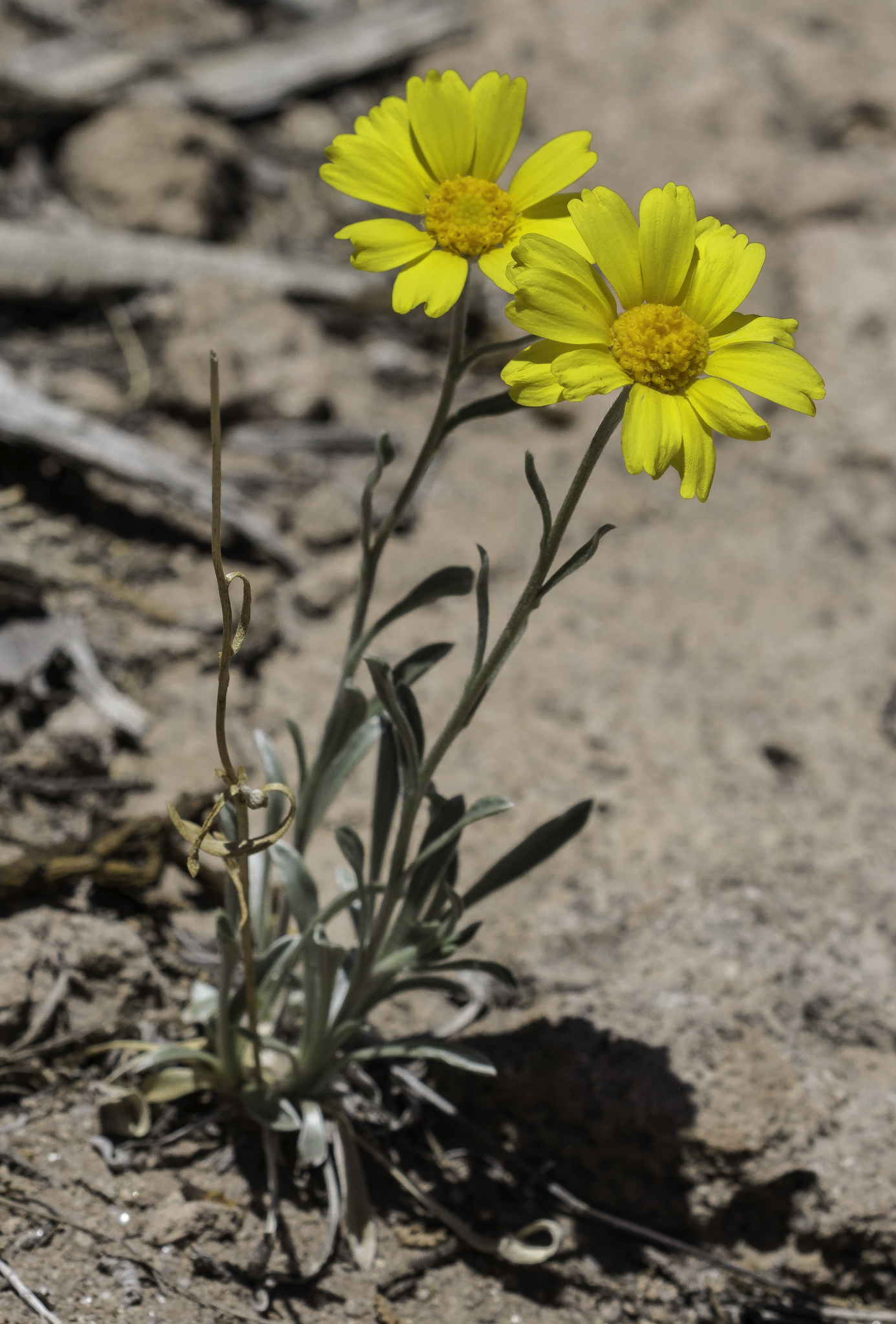

Scientific classification
- Kingdom: Plantae
- Clade: Tracheophytes
- Clade: Angiosperms
- Clade: Eudicots
- Clade: Asterids
- Order: Asterales
- Family: Asteraceae
- Genus: Tetraneuris
- Species: T. argentea

Binomial name
- Tetraneuris argentea (A.Gray) Greene 1898

Synonyms
- Synonymy: Actinella argentea A.Gray 1849; Hymenoxys argentea (A.Gray) K.F.Parker; Tetraneuris formosa Greene ex Wooton & Standl.; Tetraneuris leptoclada (A.Gray) Greene; Tetraneuris trinervata Greene; Ptilepida argentea (A. Gray) A. Heller

= Tetraneuris argentea =

Species of plant

Tetraneuris argentea, the perkysue, is a North American species of plants in the sunflower family. It grows in the southwestern United States, primarily in Arizona and New Mexico with additional populations in Utah, Colorado, and the Texas Panhandle.

Tetraneuris argentea is a perennial herb up to 42 cm (17 in) tall. It forms a branching underground caudex sometimes producing as many as 12 above-ground stems. One plant can produce as many as 30 flower heads. Each head has 8–14 yellow ray flowers surrounding 25-100 yellow disc flowers.
