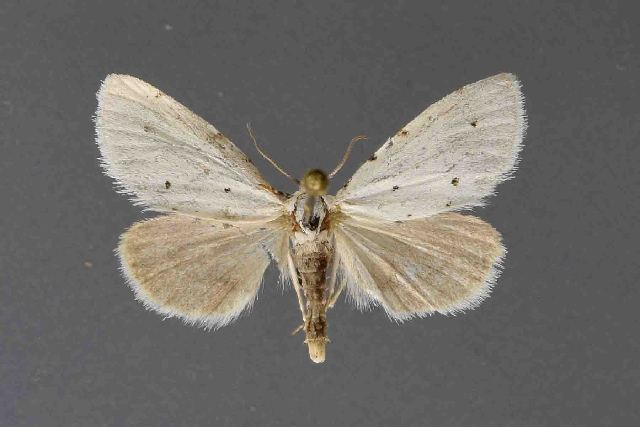
- Grotellaforma lactea

Scientific classification
- Kingdom: Animalia
- Phylum: Arthropoda
- Class: Insecta
- Order: Lepidoptera
- Superfamily: Noctuoidea
- Family: Noctuidae
- Subfamily: Grotellinae
- Genus: Grotellaforma; Barnes & Benjamin, 1922
- Species: G. lactea

Binomial name
- Grotellaforma lactea (Stretch, 1885)

Synonyms
- Cisthene lactea Stretch, 1885; Grotella calora Barnes, 1907; Grotellaforma calora (Barnes, 1907)

= Grotellaforma =

Genus of moths

Grotellaforma is a monotypic moth genus of the family Noctuidae erected by William Barnes and Foster Hendrickson Benjamin in 1922. Its only species, Grotellaforma lactea, was first described by Stretch in 1885. It is found in North America, including California and Arizona, its type locations.
