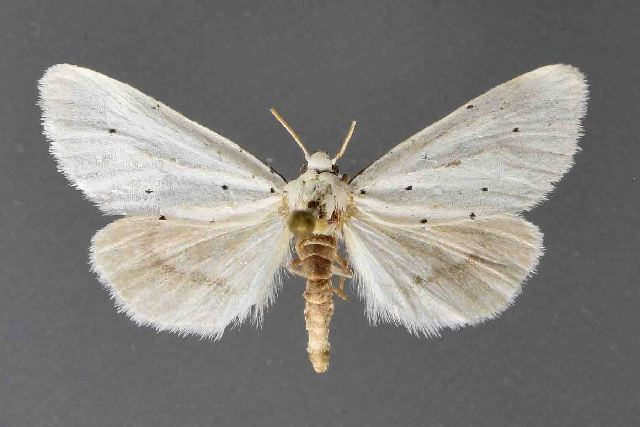

Scientific classification
- Domain: Eukaryota
- Kingdom: Animalia
- Phylum: Arthropoda
- Class: Insecta
- Order: Lepidoptera
- Superfamily: Noctuoidea
- Family: Noctuidae
- Genus: Grotella
- Species: G. blanca

Binomial name
- Grotella blanca Barnes, 1904

= Grotella blanca =

Species of moth

Grotella blanca is a species of moth in the genus Grotella, of the family Noctuidae. This moth is found in North America, including Arizona, its type location. The species was first described by William Barnes in 1904.
