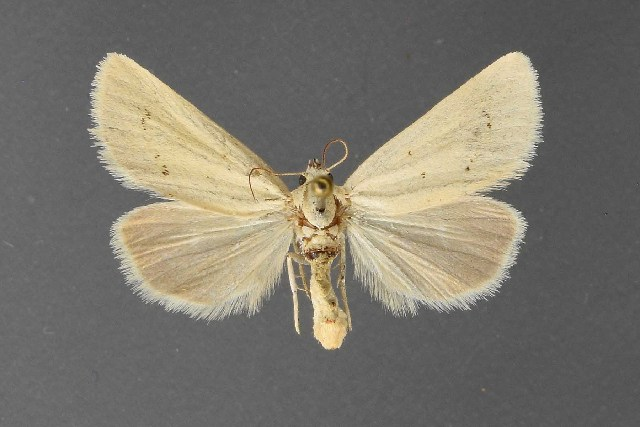

Scientific classification
- Domain: Eukaryota
- Kingdom: Animalia
- Phylum: Arthropoda
- Class: Insecta
- Order: Lepidoptera
- Superfamily: Noctuoidea
- Family: Noctuidae
- Genus: Neogrotella
- Species: N. confusa

Binomial name
- Neogrotella confusa Barnes & Benjamin, 1922

= Neogrotella confusa =

Species of moth

Neogrotella confusa is a moth in the family Noctuidae (the owlet moths). The species was first described by William Barnes and Foster Hendrickson Benjamin in 1922 and it is found in North America.

The MONA or Hodges number for Neogrotella confusa is 11231.
