= Grotella vauriae =

Scientific classification
- Domain: Eukaryota
- Kingdom: Animalia
- Phylum: Arthropoda
- Class: Insecta
- Order: Lepidoptera
- Superfamily: Noctuoidea
- Family: Noctuidae
- Genus: Grotella
- Species: G. vauriae

Binomial name
- Grotella vauriae McElvare, 1950

Species of moth

Grotella vauriae is a moth in the genus Grotella, of the family Noctuidae. The species was first described by Rowland R. McElvare in 1950. This moth species is found in North America, including Texas, its type location.
