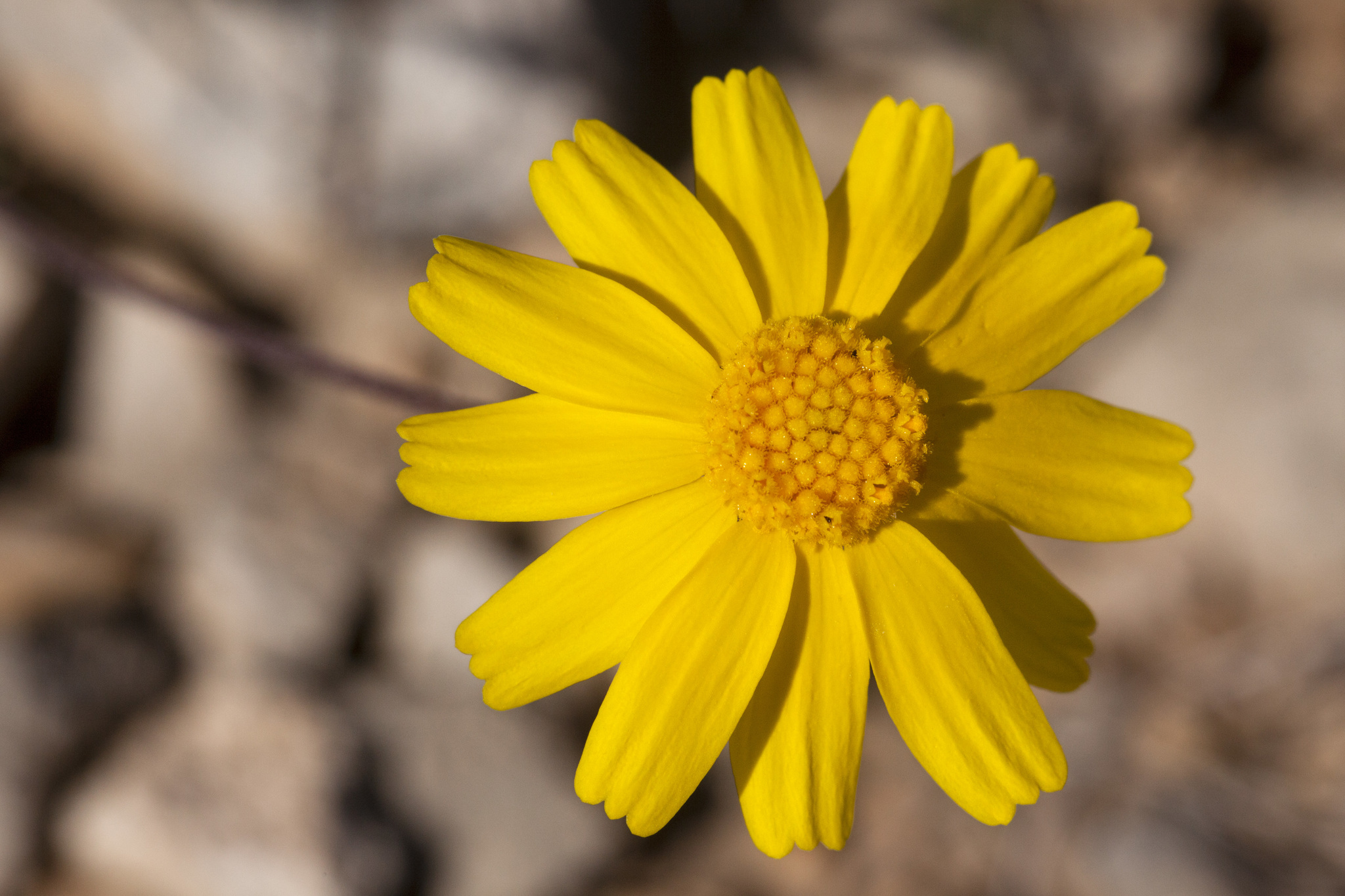

Scientific classification
- Kingdom: Plantae
- Clade: Tracheophytes
- Clade: Angiosperms
- Clade: Eudicots
- Clade: Asterids
- Order: Asterales
- Family: Asteraceae
- Genus: Tetraneuris
- Species: T. linearifolia

Binomial name
- Tetraneuris linearifolia (Hook.) Greene 1898

Synonyms
- Synonymy: Actinea linearifolia (Hook.) Kuntze; Actinea ursina Standl.; Actinella linearifolia (Hook.) Torr. & A.Gray; Hymenoxys linearifolia Hook.; Hymenoxys ursina (Standl.) B.L.Turner; Picradenia linearifolia (Hook.) Britton; Ptilepida linearifolia (Hook.) Britton; Tetraneuris dodgei (Cockerell) Rydb.; Tetraneuris latior (Cockerell) Rydb.; Tetraneuris oblongifolia Greene

= Tetraneuris linearifolia =

Species of plant

Tetraneuris linearifolia is a North American species of plants in the sunflower family, known by the common name fineleaf fournerved daisy. It grows in the south-central United States (Kansas, Oklahoma, Texas, New Mexico) and northern Mexico (Coahuila, Nuevo León, Tamaulipas).

Tetraneuris linearifolia is an annual herb up to 50 cm (20 in) tall. It forms a branching underground caudex sometimes producing as many as 10 above-ground stems. One plant can produce as many as 80 flower heads. Each head has 9–25 yellow ray flowers surrounding 50-200 yellow disc flowers.
