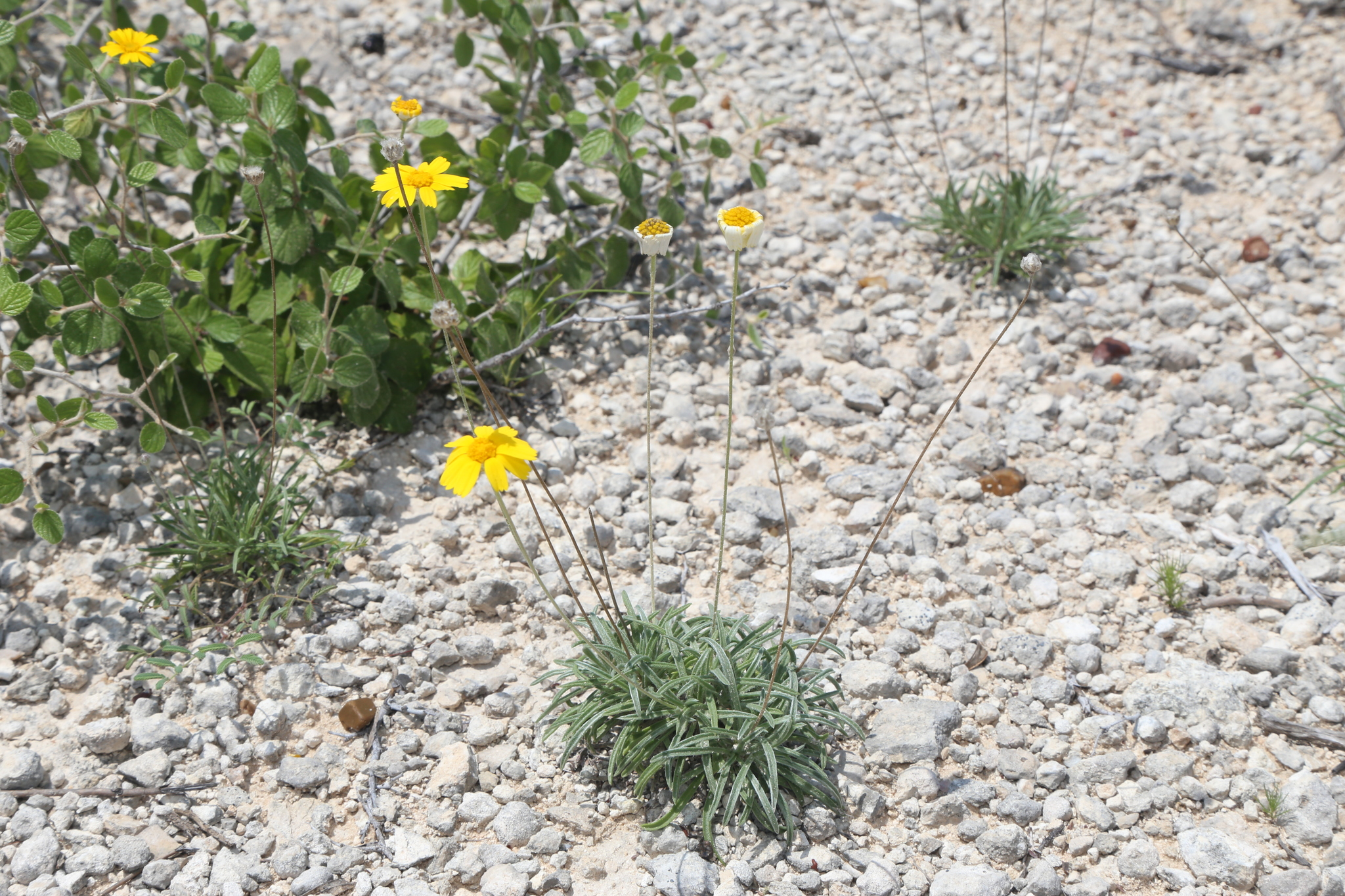

Scientific classification
- Kingdom: Plantae
- Clade: Tracheophytes
- Clade: Angiosperms
- Clade: Eudicots
- Clade: Asterids
- Order: Asterales
- Family: Asteraceae
- Genus: Tetraneuris
- Species: T. turneri

Binomial name
- Tetraneuris turneri (K.F.Parker) K.F.Parker 1980

Synonyms
- Hymenoxys turneri K.F.Parker 1970

= Tetraneuris turneri =

Species of plant

Tetraneuris turneri is a North American species of plants in the sunflower family, known by the common name Turner's four-nerve daisy. It has been found in the US state of Texas and in the nearby Mexican state of Coahuila.

Tetraneuris turneri is a perennial herb up to 50 cm (20 in) tall. It forms a branching underground caudex sometimes producing as many as 20 unbranched, above-ground stems, sometimes some of them leaning against other vegetation. The plant generally produces one flower head per stem. Each head has 12–24 yellow ray flowers surrounding 100–250 yellow disc flowers
