= Grotella pyronaea =

Scientific classification
- Domain: Eukaryota
- Kingdom: Animalia
- Phylum: Arthropoda
- Class: Insecta
- Order: Lepidoptera
- Superfamily: Noctuoidea
- Family: Noctuidae
- Genus: Grotella
- Species: G. pyronaea

Binomial name
- Grotella pyronaea H. Druce, 1895

Species of moth

Grotella pyronaea is a moth in the genus Grotella, of the family Noctuidae. It was first described by Herbert Druce in 1895. This species is found in North America, including Guerrero, Mexico, its type location.
