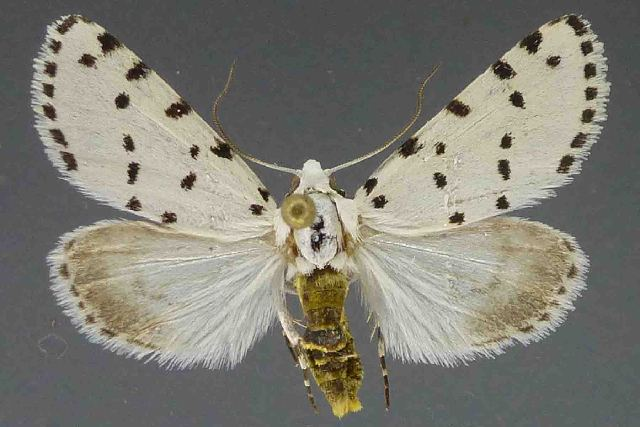

Scientific classification
- Domain: Eukaryota
- Kingdom: Animalia
- Phylum: Arthropoda
- Class: Insecta
- Order: Lepidoptera
- Superfamily: Noctuoidea
- Family: Noctuidae
- Genus: Grotella
- Species: G. blanchardi

Binomial name
- Grotella blanchardi McElvare, 1966

= Grotella blanchardi =

Species of moth

Grotella blanchardi is a moth in the genus Grotella, of the family Noctuidae. The species was first described by Rowland R. McElvare in 1866. This moth species is found in North America, including New Mexico (its type location) and Texas.

The wingspan is about 26 mm.
