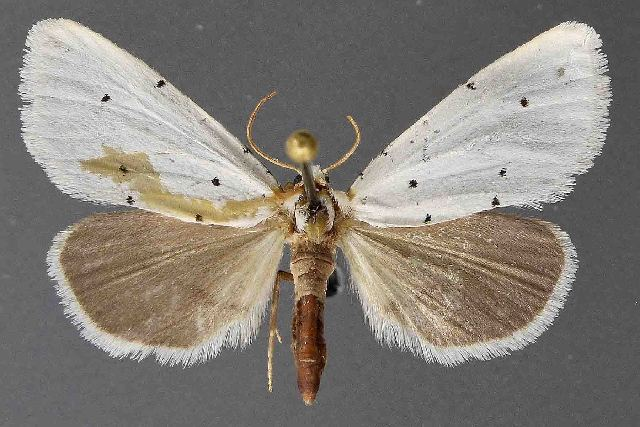

Scientific classification
- Kingdom: Animalia
- Phylum: Arthropoda
- Clade: Pancrustacea
- Class: Insecta
- Order: Lepidoptera
- Superfamily: Noctuoidea
- Family: Noctuidae
- Genus: Grotella
- Species: G. dis

Binomial name
- Grotella dis Grote, 1883

= Grotella dis =

Species of moth

Grotella dis is a species of moth in the family Noctuidae. It was first described by Augustus Radcliffe Grote in 1883. This moth species is found in North America, from the Argus Mountains in Kansas to northern Mexico.

== Description ==
Head and thorax white; antennae ochreous; pectus, legs, and abdomen tinged with brown. Forewing pure white, the costal edge black towards base. Hindwing white suffused with fuscous: the cilia pure white. Underside of forewing suffused with fuscous; hindwing white, with curved postmedial line, the costal and terminal areas suffused with fuscous.
