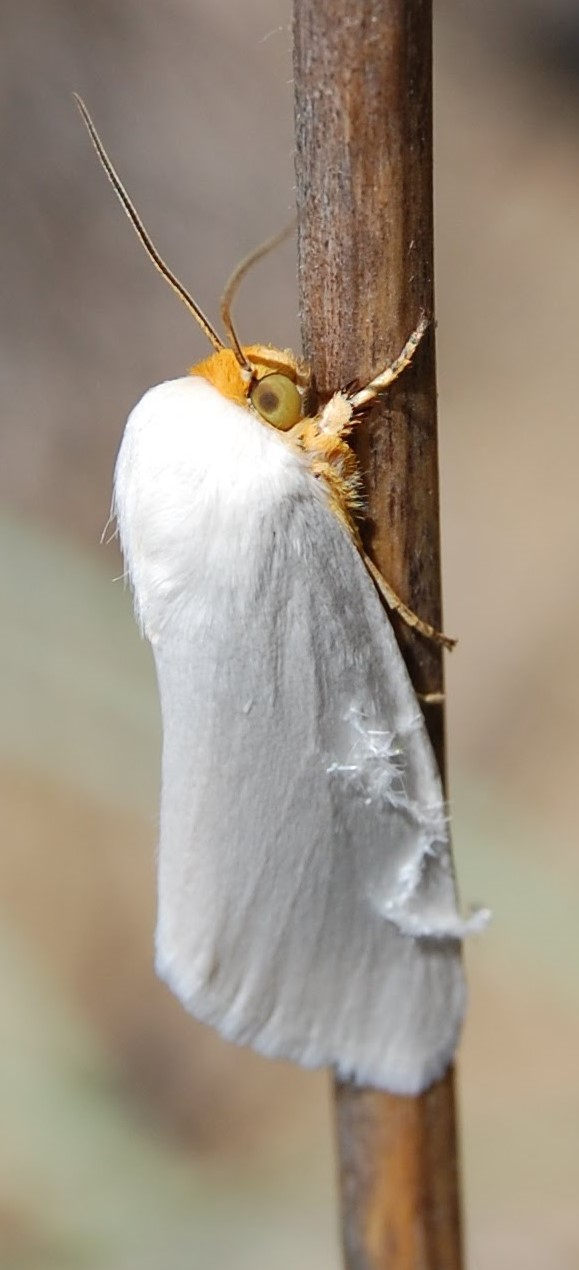
- adult white flower moth

Scientific classification
- Kingdom: Animalia
- Phylum: Arthropoda
- Clade: Pancrustacea
- Class: Insecta
- Order: Lepidoptera
- Superfamily: Noctuoidea
- Family: Noctuidae
- Genus: Schinia
- Species: S. bimatris

Binomial name
- Schinia bimatris (Harvey, 1875)

Synonyms
- Pippona bimatris Harvey, 1875; Lygranthoecia bimatris (Harvey, 1875); Adonisea bimatris (Harvey, 1875)

= Schinia bimatris =

Species of moth

The white flower moth (Schinia bimatris) is a moth of the family Noctuidae found in the United States and Canada. It is designated as Endangered under Canada's Species At Risk Act and Manitoba's Endangered Species and Ecosystems Act.

== Description ==
The appearance of white flower moth larvae is unknown. The wings, thorax, and abdomen of adult moths are completely white, while the head is orange. Adults have a wingspan of about 30 mm (1.2 in).

== Range ==
The range of this species includes much of the south-central and south-eastern United States and a disjunct population in the Carberry sandhills in Manitoba, Canada.

== Ecology ==
In the United States, the white flower moth has been recorded in coastal longleaf pine woodlands, while in Canada it is restricted to open sand dune areas. The larval food plant(s) has yet to be determined but it has been suggested that the larvae may feed on Nuttall's Evening-primrose (Oenothera nuttallii). The adults are primarily nocturnal but have been observed flying during the day.

== Taxonomy ==
This species was first described by Leon F. Harvey in 1875 as Pippona bimatris from specimens collected in Bosque County, Texas, by Gustav Belfrage, but was later transferred to Schinia.
