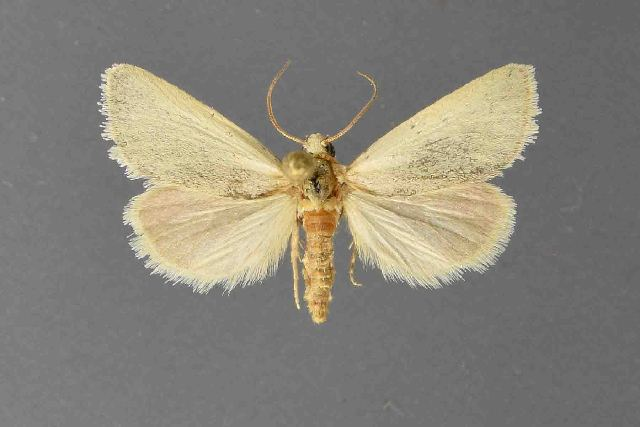

Scientific classification
- Domain: Eukaryota
- Kingdom: Animalia
- Phylum: Arthropoda
- Class: Insecta
- Order: Lepidoptera
- Superfamily: Noctuoidea
- Family: Noctuidae
- Genus: Grotella
- Species: G. grisescens

Binomial name
- Grotella grisescens (Barnes & McDunnough, 1910)

= Grotella grisescens =

Species of moth

Grotella grisescens is a moth in the genus Grotella, of the family Noctuidae. The species was first described by William Barnes and James Halliday McDunnough in 1910. This moth species is found in North America, including New Mexico (its type location) and Arizona.
