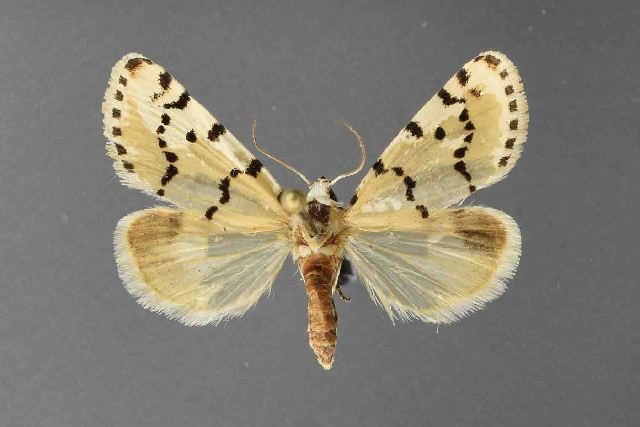

Scientific classification
- Kingdom: Animalia
- Phylum: Arthropoda
- Clade: Pancrustacea
- Class: Insecta
- Order: Lepidoptera
- Superfamily: Noctuoidea
- Family: Noctuidae
- Genus: Grotella
- Species: G. binda

Binomial name
- Grotella binda Barnes & McDunnough, 1907

= Grotella binda =

Species of moth

Grotella binda is a moth in the genus Grotella, of the family Noctuidae. The species was first described by William Barnes and James Halliday McDunnough in 1907. This moth species is found in North America, including Arizona, its type location.
