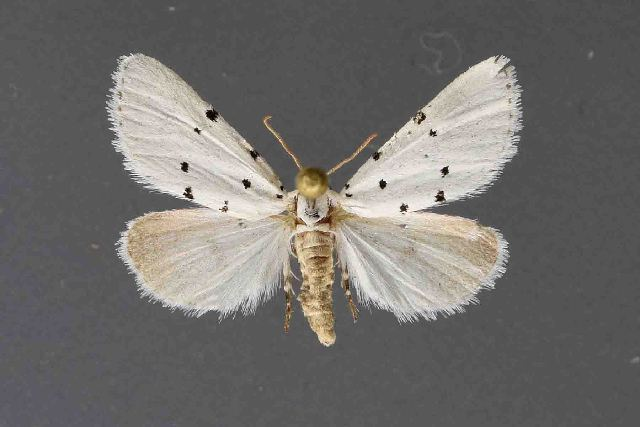

Scientific classification
- Kingdom: Animalia
- Phylum: Arthropoda
- Class: Insecta
- Order: Lepidoptera
- Superfamily: Noctuoidea
- Family: Noctuidae
- Genus: Grotella
- Species: G. harveyi

Binomial name
- Grotella harveyi Barnes & Benjamin, 1922

= Grotella harveyi =

Species of moth

Grotella harveyi is a species of moth in the genus Grotella, of the family Noctuidae. This moth species is found in North America, including Colorado, its type location.

It was first described by William Barnes and Foster Hendrickson Benjamin in 1922.
