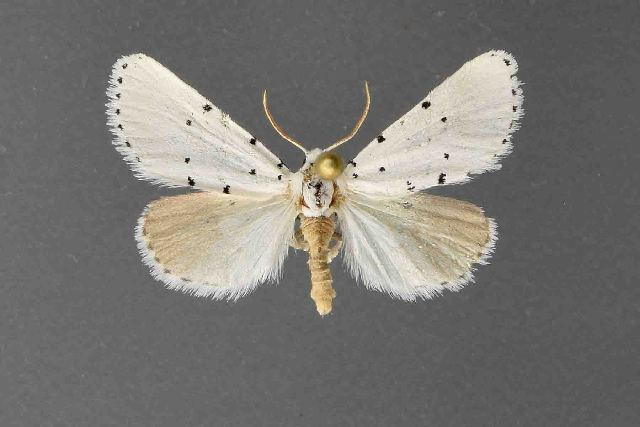

Scientific classification
- Domain: Eukaryota
- Kingdom: Animalia
- Phylum: Arthropoda
- Class: Insecta
- Order: Lepidoptera
- Superfamily: Noctuoidea
- Family: Noctuidae
- Genus: Grotella
- Species: G. sampita

Binomial name
- Grotella sampita Barnes & McDunnough, 1907

= Grotella sampita =

Species of moth

Grotella sampita is a moth in the genus Grotella, of the family Noctuidae. The species was first described by William Barnes and James Halliday McDunnough in 1907. This moth species is found in North America, including Arizona, its type location.

The wingspan is about 20 mm.
