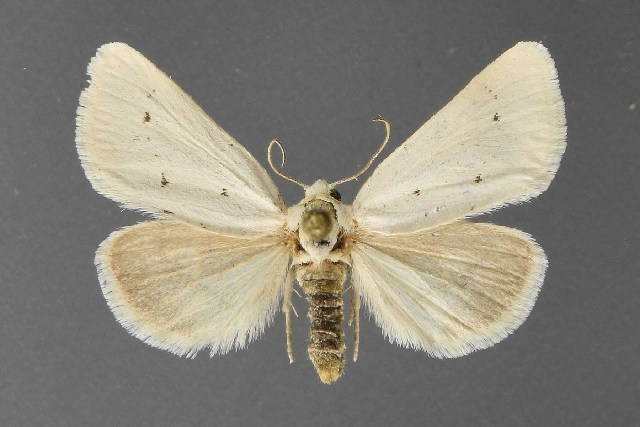

Scientific classification
- Domain: Eukaryota
- Kingdom: Animalia
- Phylum: Arthropoda
- Class: Insecta
- Order: Lepidoptera
- Superfamily: Noctuoidea
- Family: Noctuidae
- Genus: Grotella
- Species: G. stretchi

Binomial name
- Grotella stretchi Barnes & Benjamin, 1922

= Grotella stretchi =

Species of moth

Grotella stretchi is a species of moth in the genus Grotella, of the family Noctuidae. This moth species was first described by William Barnes and Foster Hendrickson Benjamin in 1922. It is found in North America, including California, its type location.

The wingspan is about 20 mm.
