= Grotella melanocrypta =

Scientific classification
- Kingdom: Animalia
- Phylum: Arthropoda
- Class: Insecta
- Order: Lepidoptera
- Superfamily: Noctuoidea
- Family: Noctuidae
- Genus: Grotella
- Species: G. melanocrypta

Binomial name
- Grotella melanocrypta (Dyar, 1912)

Synonyms
- Antaplaga melanocrypta Dyar, 1912

Species of moth

Grotella melanocrypta is a moth in the genus Grotella, of the family Noctuidae. The species was first described by Harrison Gray Dyar Jr. in 1912. This moth species is found in North America, including Puebla, Mexico, its type location.
