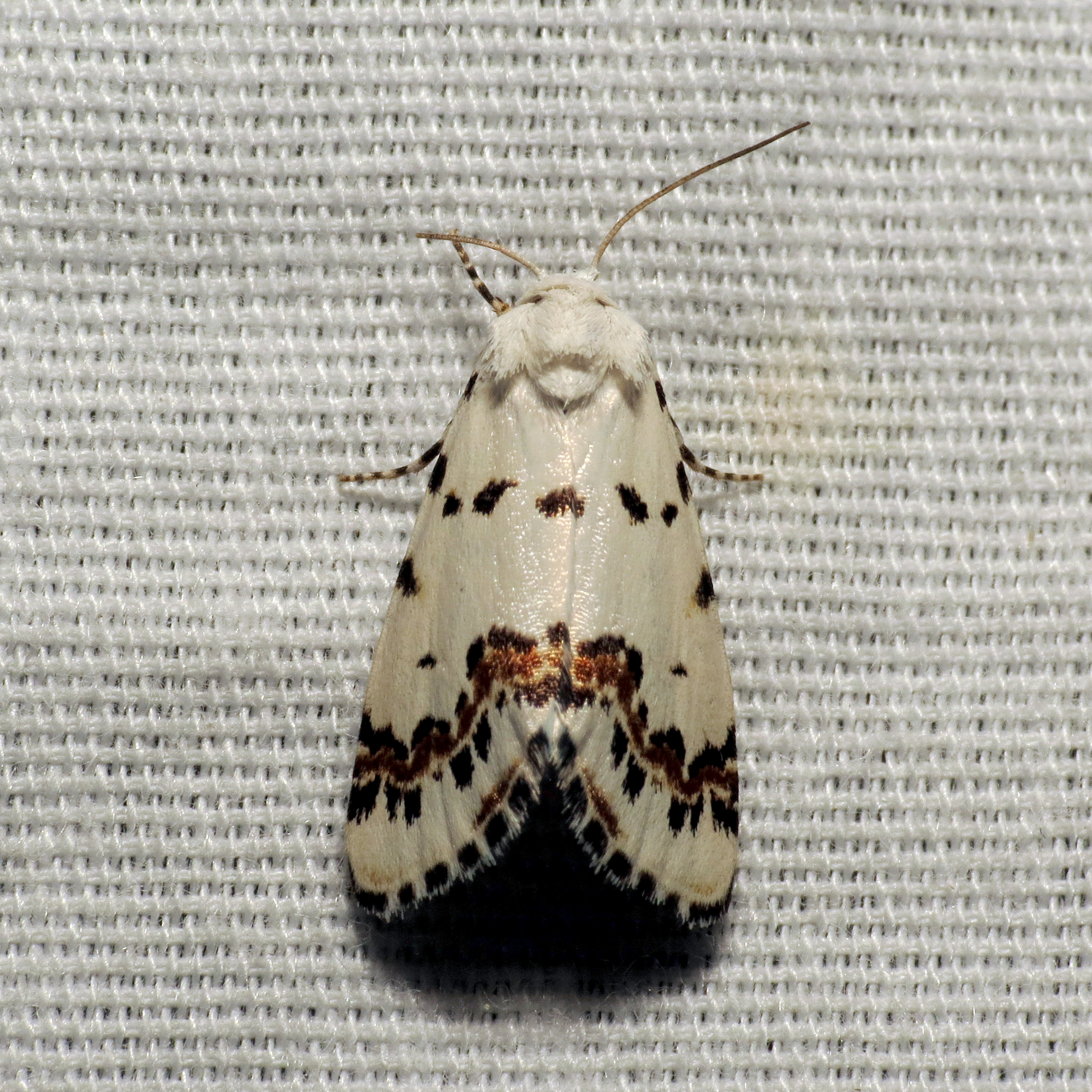

Scientific classification
- Domain: Eukaryota
- Kingdom: Animalia
- Phylum: Arthropoda
- Class: Insecta
- Order: Lepidoptera
- Superfamily: Noctuoidea
- Family: Noctuidae
- Genus: Grotella
- Species: G. tricolor

Binomial name
- Grotella tricolor Barnes, 1904

= Grotella tricolor =

Species of moth

Grotella tricolor is a species of moth in the genus Grotella, of the family Noctuidae. This moth is found in the US states of California and Arizona. It was first described by William Barnes in 1904.

The wingspan is 20–23 mm. Adults are on wing from August to September.
