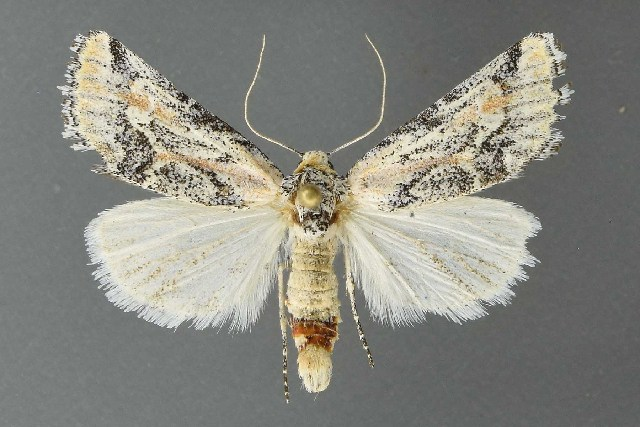

Scientific classification
- Domain: Eukaryota
- Kingdom: Animalia
- Phylum: Arthropoda
- Class: Insecta
- Order: Lepidoptera
- Superfamily: Noctuoidea
- Family: Noctuidae
- Genus: Podagra; J. B. Smith, 1902
- Species: P. crassipes

Binomial name
- Podagra crassipes Smith, 1902

= Podagra crassipes =

Species of moth

Podagra is a monotypic moth genus of the family Noctuidae. Its only species, Podagra crassipes, is found in the US state of Arizona. Both the genus and species were first described by John Bernhardt Smith in 1902.
