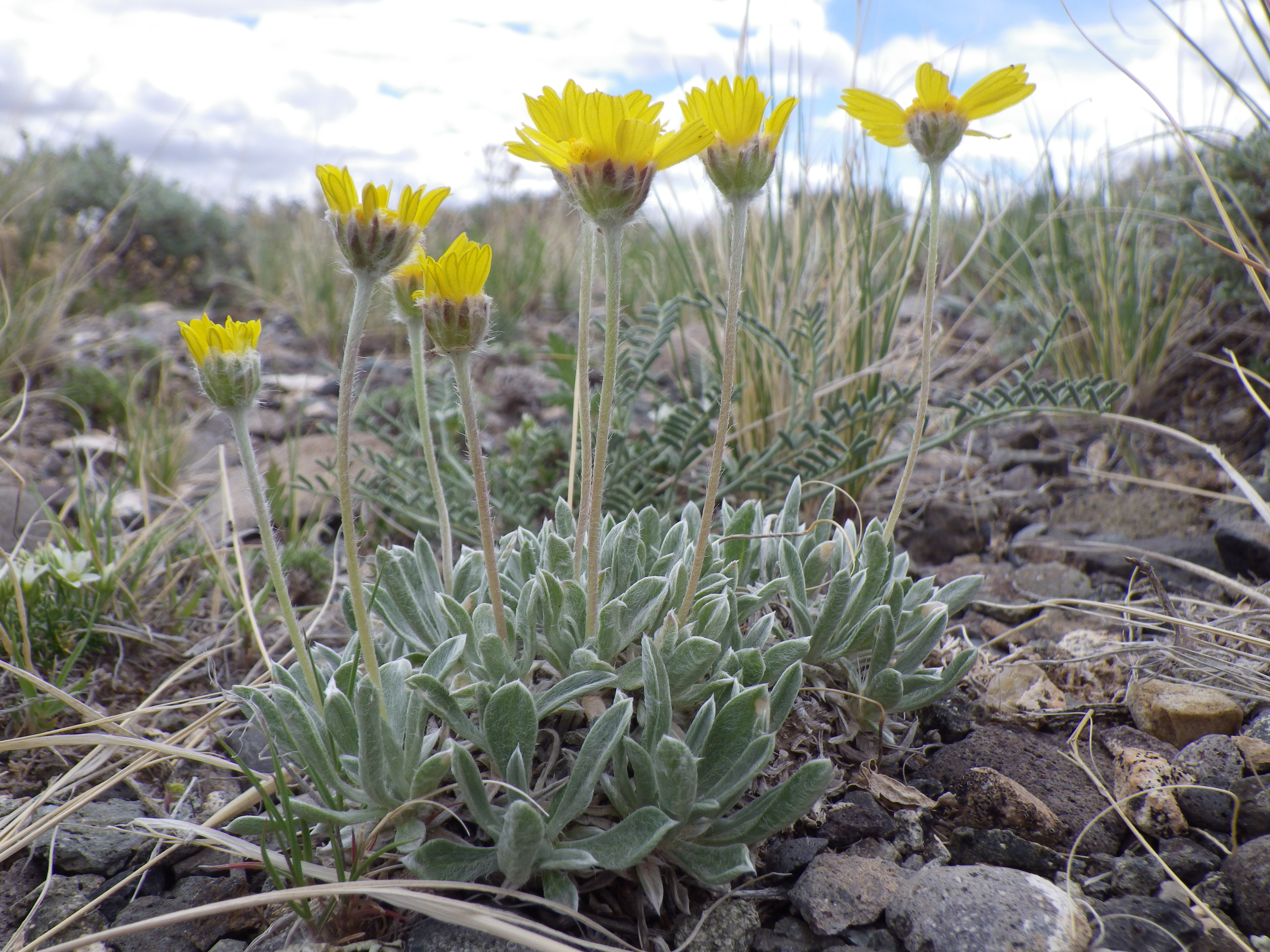

Conservation status
- Secure (NatureServe)

Scientific classification
- Kingdom: Plantae
- Clade: Tracheophytes
- Clade: Angiosperms
- Clade: Eudicots
- Clade: Asterids
- Order: Asterales
- Family: Asteraceae
- Genus: Tetraneuris
- Species: T. acaulis

Binomial name
- Tetraneuris acaulis Greene

Varieties
- Tetraneuris acaulis var. acaulis; Tetraneuris acaulis var. arizonica (Greene) K.F.Parker; Tetraneuris acaulis var. caespitosa A.Nelson; Tetraneuris acaulis var. epunctata (A.Nelson) Kartesz & Gandhi

Synonyms
- See table

= Tetraneuris acaulis =

Species of flowering plant in the sunflower family

Tetraneuris acaulis is a North American species of flowering plants in the sunflower family. It is known by many common names in English including stemless four-nerve daisy, stemless hymenoxys, butte marigold, and stemless rubberweed.

== Description ==
Tetraneuris acaulis is a highly variable perennial plant that grows from a large, coarse taproot. It may be moderate in size or an extremely short herbaceous plant, 2 centimeters to over 30 centimeters in height when flowering. The plants lack stems with all the clustered leaves growing directly from the base of the plant at ground level (basal leaves). The leaves are tightly packed and may be spoon shaped (spatulate) or like a spear head with the widest part in the end third (oblanceolate), sometimes narrowly so (linear-oblanceolate). The leaf edges lack teeth or divisions and may either be hairy or smooth.

Each flowering stem has a single flower head at the end, though very rarely a stem may have two flower heads on a single stem. The flowering stem does not have any leaves (a scape) and each plant may grow between one and thirty-five flowering stems, but occasionally a plant may produce as many as sixty. They are also quite variable in the length, ranging from 0.5 to 30 centimetres (0.2 to 10 inches).

The flowering head will have a large number of small disc flowers, ranging from twenty-five to over two-hundred. The ray flowers at the edge of the flowering head usually number from eight to fifteen, but may occasionally number as many as twenty-one. The petals (ligules) are showy, 5–20 mm (1/4–3/4 in) long and fairly wide, 3–8 mm (1/8–5/16 in). Both the ray and the disc flowers are predominantly bright yellow in color. Some plants may have no ray florets. It may flower anytime from April to October in its native range, though different varieties have slightly different flowering seasons.

The fruits are dry achenes only a few millimeters long.

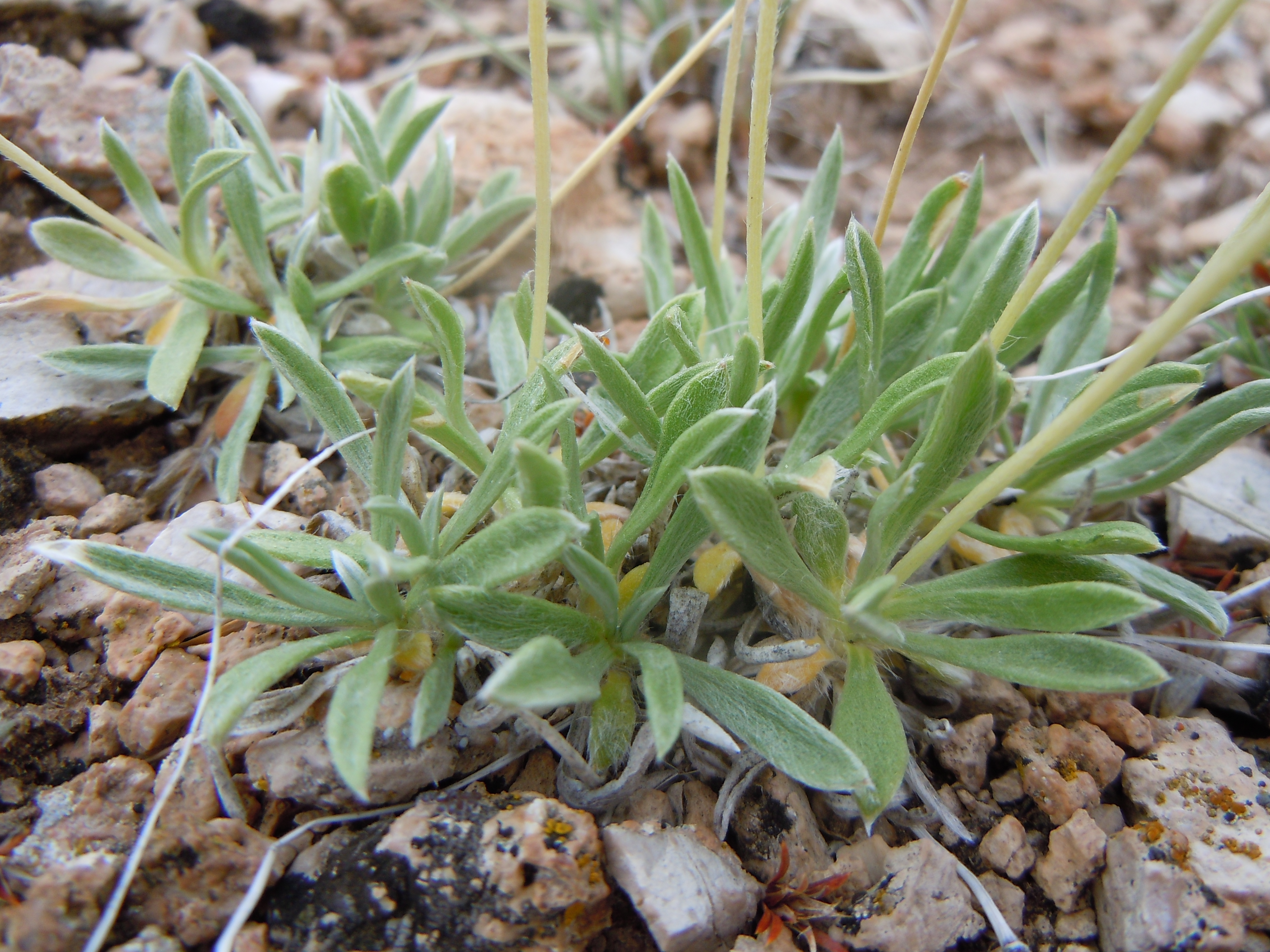
Close-up of basal leaves

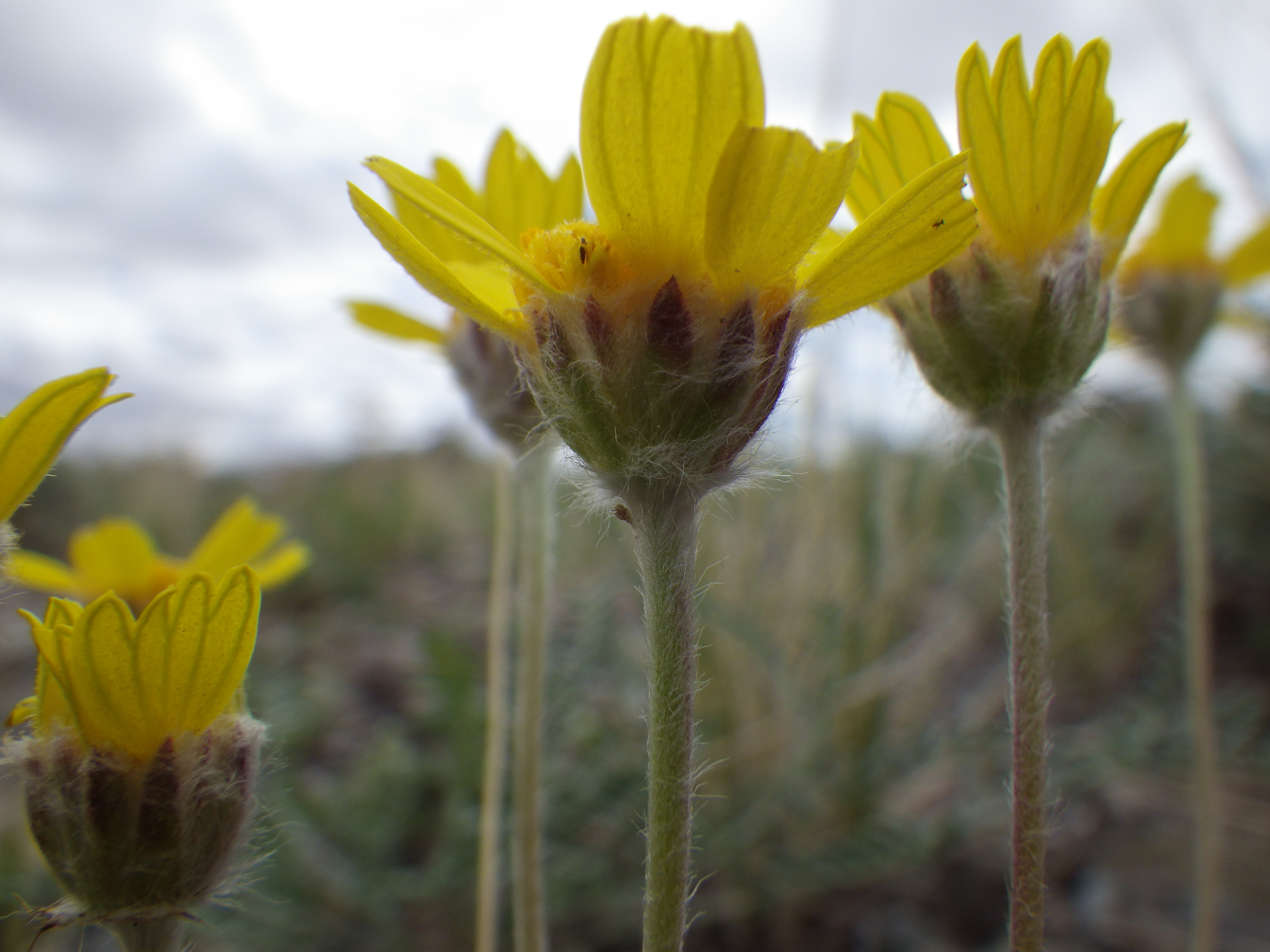
Side view of flowers

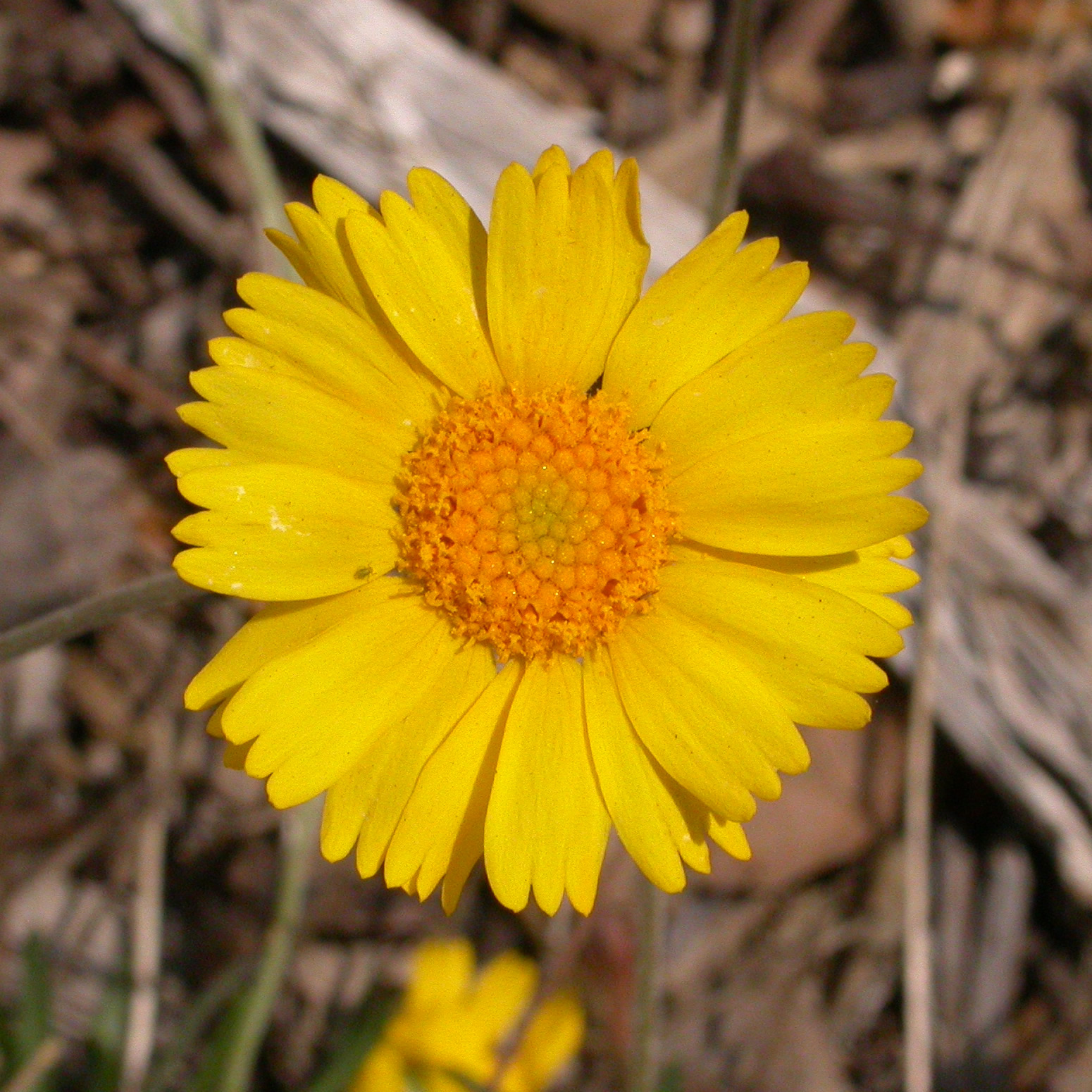
Flower close-up

== Taxonomy ==
As of 2024 Plants of the World Online (POWO) and World Flora Online list Tetraneuris acaulis as the correct name with only Edward Lee Greene listed as the authority due to the narrowness of the original description by Frederick Traugott Pursh.

=== Varieties ===
There are four accepted varieties of Tetraneuris acaulis.

==== Tetraneuris acaulis var. acaulis ====
The autonymic variety described by Frederick Traugott Pursh in 1813 as Tetraneuris acaulis, but it was described narrowly as a subset of became described as the variety (a heterotypic synonym). This was also the case for all the many other species that are now synonyms of this variety according to POWO. It differs from the other varieties by being covered in very fine, woolly hairs that lay down on the surface of leaves (strigoso-canescent) and being found almost entirely east of the continental divide in North America. In its native habitat it may bloom as early as April or as late as October, but more often in May to July.

==== Tetraneuris acaulis var. arizonica ====
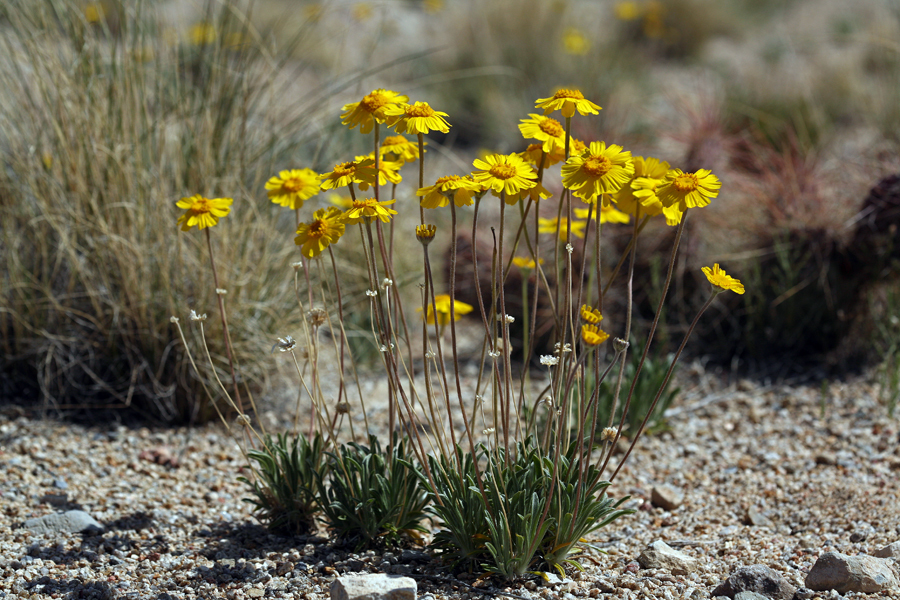
Tetraneuris acaulis var. arizonica flowering New York Mountains, San Bernardino County, California

The first scientific description of this variety was by Edward Lee Greene in 1898 as a species named Tetraneuris arizonica. It was given its current description as a variety in 1980 by Kittie Fenley Parker. Like variety epunctata it usually has smooth or only sparsely/moderately hairy leaves, but unlike var. epunctata it is densely covered in glands. It may bloom as early as April or as late as September in its native habitat, but more often May to July. Though it is also found east of the Great Divide, the majority of its range is to the west in the great basin and desert southwest stretching to the deserts of California. It grows in a range of habitats including alongside roads, on hillsides, in grasslands, edges of woods, aspen meadows at elevations of 1300–2900 meters.

==== Tetraneuris acaulis var. caespitosa ====
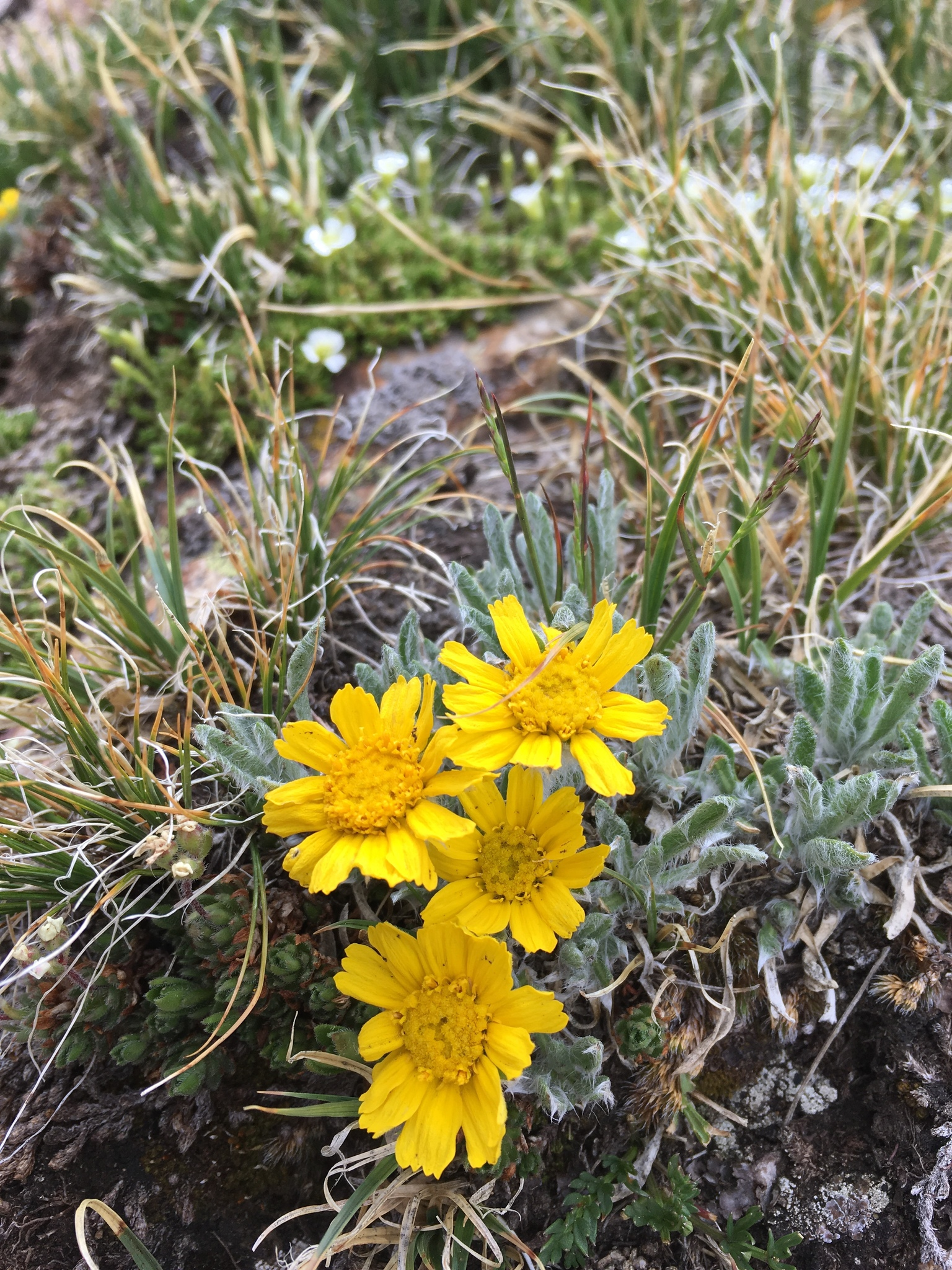
Tetraneuris acaulis var. caespitosa flowering in the Wheeler Peak Wilderness, New Mexico

This variety was described by Greene as two different species, Tetraneuris brevifolia and Tetraneuris lanata, in 1898. It was additionally described as a third species in 1911 by Francis Potter Daniels. But it had already been correctly described and named as a variety in 1899 by Aven Nelson as Tetraneuris acaulis var. caespitosa. This variety is distinguished by being sparsely to densely hairy, and its hairs usually being long and interwoven (lanuginose), but occasionally they will be silky and lay down on the surface of the leaves (sericeous). Also, its flower stems (a peduncle) will be short in comparison to what is normal for other varieties, usually just 0.5–8 centimeters where other varieties will most often be 5–20 centimeters. Plants may bloom as early as May or as late as September in its high mountain habitat, but more frequently between June and August.

==== Tetraneuris acaulis var. epunctata ====
Aven Nelson gave a scientific description to this variety in 1904 as a species named Tetraneuris epunctata. It was described as a variety by Arthur Cronquist in 1994 and reclassified along with the rest of the species by John T. Kartesz and Kanchi Gandhi in 1995. Like variety arizonica these plants have smooth or only sparsely/moderately hairy leaves, but var. epunctata lacks visible glands on its leaves or at most is dotted with just a few glands. This variety blooms as early as May or as late as September, but rarely after the month of July in its native range. It is only found in the US states of Colorado, Utah, and Wyoming.

=== History ===
The first scientific description of part of what was later classified as Tetraneuris acaulis was by the botanist Frederick Pursh in 1813. He described a species he named Gaillardia acaulis, which as of 2024 is regarded as a synonym of the botanical variety Tetraneuris acaulis var. acaulis. The accepted description as Tetraneuris acaulis was published by Edward Lee Greene in 1898. Due to the variability of the species 32 species that are now regarded as synonyms of one of the four accepted varieties have been described.

Table of Synonyms
Name	Year	Rank	Synonym of:	Notes
Actinea acaulis Spreng.	1826	species	var. acaulis	= het.
Actinea acaulis f. arizonica J.F.Macbr.	1918	form	var. arizonica	= het.
Actinea acaulis var. arizonica Greene) S.F.Blake ex Munz	1935	variety	var. arizonica	≡ hom.
Actinea acaulis f. caespitosa J.F.Macbr.	1918	form	var. caespitosa	= het.
Actinea acaulis var. lanata J.F.Macbr.	1918	variety	var. acaulis	= het.
Actinea acaulis var. lanigera S.F.Blake	1925	variety	var. acaulis	= het.
Actinea acaulis var. septentrionalis A.Nelson	1924	variety	var. acaulis	= het.
Actinea acaulis var. simplex J.F.Macbr.	1918	variety	var. acaulis	= het.
Actinea arizonica A.Nelson	1924	species	var. arizonica	= het.
Actinea depressa var. pygmaea J.F.Macbr.	1918	variety	var. acaulis	= het.
Actinea epunctata (A.Nelson) A.Nelson	1924	species	var. epunctata	≡ hom.
Actinea eradiata A.Nelson	1924	species	var. acaulis	= het.
Actinea formosa A.Nelson	1924	species	var. acaulis	= het.
Actinea incana A.Nelson	1924	species	var. acaulis	= het.
Actinea osterhoutii A.Nelson	1924	species	var. acaulis	= het.
Actinea simplex A.Nelson	1924	species	var. acaulis	= het.
Actinella acaulis (Pursh) Nutt.	1818	species	var. acaulis	= het.
Actinella depressa var. pygmaea A.Gray	1849	variety	var. acaulis	= het.
Actinella epunctata (A.Nelson) A.Nelson	1909	species	var. epunctata	≡ hom.
Actinella eradiata A.Nelson	1909	species	var. acaulis	= het.
Actinella incana A.Nelson	1909	species	var. acaulis	= het.
Actinella lanata Nutt.	1841	species	var. acaulis	= het.
Actinella leptoclada A.Gray	1857	species	var. acaulis	= het.
Actinella simplex A.Nelson	1909	species	var. acaulis	= het.
Cephalophora acaulis DC.	1836	species	var. acaulis	= het.
Gaillardia acaulis Pursh	1813	species	var. acaulis	= het.
Hymenoxys acaulis (Pursh) K.F.Parker	1950	species	var. acaulis	= het.
Hymenoxys acaulis var. arizonica (Greene) K.F.Parker	1950	variety	var. arizonica	≡ hom.
Hymenoxys acaulis var. epunctata (A.Nelson) Cronquist	1994	variety	var. epunctata	≡ hom.
Hymenoxys acaulis var. nana S.L.Welsh	1993	variety	var. arizonica	= het.
Hymenoxys acaulis var. caespitosa (A.Nelson) K.F.Parker	1950	variety	var. caespitosa	≡ hom.
Leptopoda acaulis DC.	1836	species	var. acaulis	= het.
Picradenia acaulis Britton	1898	species	var. acaulis	= het.
Ptilepida acaulis (Pursh) Britton	1894	species	var. acaulis	= het.
Tetraneuris acaulis var. nana (S.L.Welsh	1995	variety	var. arizonica	= het.
Tetraneuris arizonica Greene	1898	species	var. arizonica	≡ hom.
Tetraneuris brevifolia Greene	1898	species	var. caespitosa	= het.
Tetraneuris crandallii Rydb.	1905	species	var. epunctata	= het.
Tetraneuris epunctata A.Nelson	1904	species	var. epunctata	≡ hom.
Tetraneuris eradiata A.Nelson	1904	species	var. acaulis	= het.
Tetraneuris incana A.Nelson	1899	species	var. acaulis	= het.
Tetraneuris lanata Greene	1898	species	var. caespitosa	= het.
Tetraneuris lanigera Daniels	1911	species	var. caespitosa	= het.
Tetraneuris pygmaea Wooton & Standl.	1913	species	var. acaulis	= het.
Tetraneuris septentrionalis Rydb.	1910	species	var. acaulis	= het.
Tetraneuris simplex A.Nelson	1899	species	var. acaulis	= het.
Notes: ≡ homotypic synonym; = heterotypic synonym

=== Names ===
The meaning of the genus name Tetraneuris is "four nerves", a compound of "tetra" and "neuron". This refers to the four veins on the ray flower petal. The botanical species name is also a compound meaning "without a stem", the prefix "a-" being added to "caulis" for stem. Though its flowers are on stalks, these are not botanically stems. One of the frequently used common names of this species is "stemless four-nerve daisy" related to the genus name and the low growing stemless habit. Three other English names relate to it leaves not growing on stems, "stemless woollybase", "stemless hymenoxys", and "stemless rubberweed". It is also sometimes known as the "butte marigold" or the "sundancer daisy". Somewhat specific to the variety Arizonica is the common name "angelita daisy".

== Distribution and habitat ==
This species is very widespread in the United States from Texas and California in the south to Idaho and North Dakota. It is found east of the Rocky Mountains on in the western part of the Great Plains in the northern panhandle of Texas and the westernmost counties of Oklahoma, Kansas, Nebraska, South Dakota, and North Dakota. It is found throughout the Rocky Mountain states of Montana, Wyoming, and Colorado as well as almost all of New Mexico, but is only found in the southeast corner of Idaho. It also grows in the northern half of Arizona, the eastern half of Nevada, and the desert county of San Bernardino in California. In Canada it is found in the prairie provinces of Alberta and Saskatchewan. In Saskatchewan a single colony of the plant, apparently not reproducing, is found on the Missouri Coteau 11–12 kilometers south of Mortlach. In Alberta it is found in the Writing-on-Stone Provincial Park.

It grows in a variety of habitat types in foothills and subalpine regions, and high prairie, badlands, and plains.

== Ecology ==
In an experiment marking individual native bees at nuseries carrying native plants in California, it was found that the bees made the choice to revisit the blooms of Tetraneuris acaulis at a higher than expected rates.

The conservation non-profit NatureServe evaluated this species in 2016 and found it to be "globally secure" (G5), a conservation status meaning it is common and widespread without any longterm threats or significant population declines. At the state and proviencial level they evaluated it as "secure" (S5) in Utah and Wyoming and "apparently secure" (S4) in Montana. The species is vulnerable (S3) in Alberta and Nevada and "imperiled" (S2) in Saskatchewan. It has not been evaluated at the state or provincial level in the rest of its range.

== Uses ==
Tetraneuris acaulis has been used as a traditional medicinal plant. The Hopi used a poultice of the plant to relieve hip and back pain in pregnant women, and to make a stimulating drink.

=== Cultivation ===
Stemless four-nerve daisies are grown by gardeners in rock gardens, including areas beyond its native distribution. It is also grown in areas where water use is a concern due to its very low water requirements. To keep plants compact, growers plant them in lean soils without much organic material, though the species is not sensitive about soil requirements. They require full sun, with a dry slope being ideal. The salt tolerance of a cultivated selection of Tetraneuris acaulis var. arizonica was tested at Utah State University and found to be very high in comparison with many other cultivated plants. In cultivation, stemless four-nerved daisy may bloom in late spring or early summer. The foliage is aromatic. It is winter hardy in USDA zones 4–8, temperatures as cold as −35 °C (−31 °F). The seeds have very little to no requirement for cold stratification to germinate. An experiment found 100% germination in 3–5 days at a temperature of 21 °C (70 °F). However, it does not reproduce from seed very readily in a garden setting, limiting its spread in formal plantings.
