= Leon F. Harvey =

American entomologist, physician and dentist

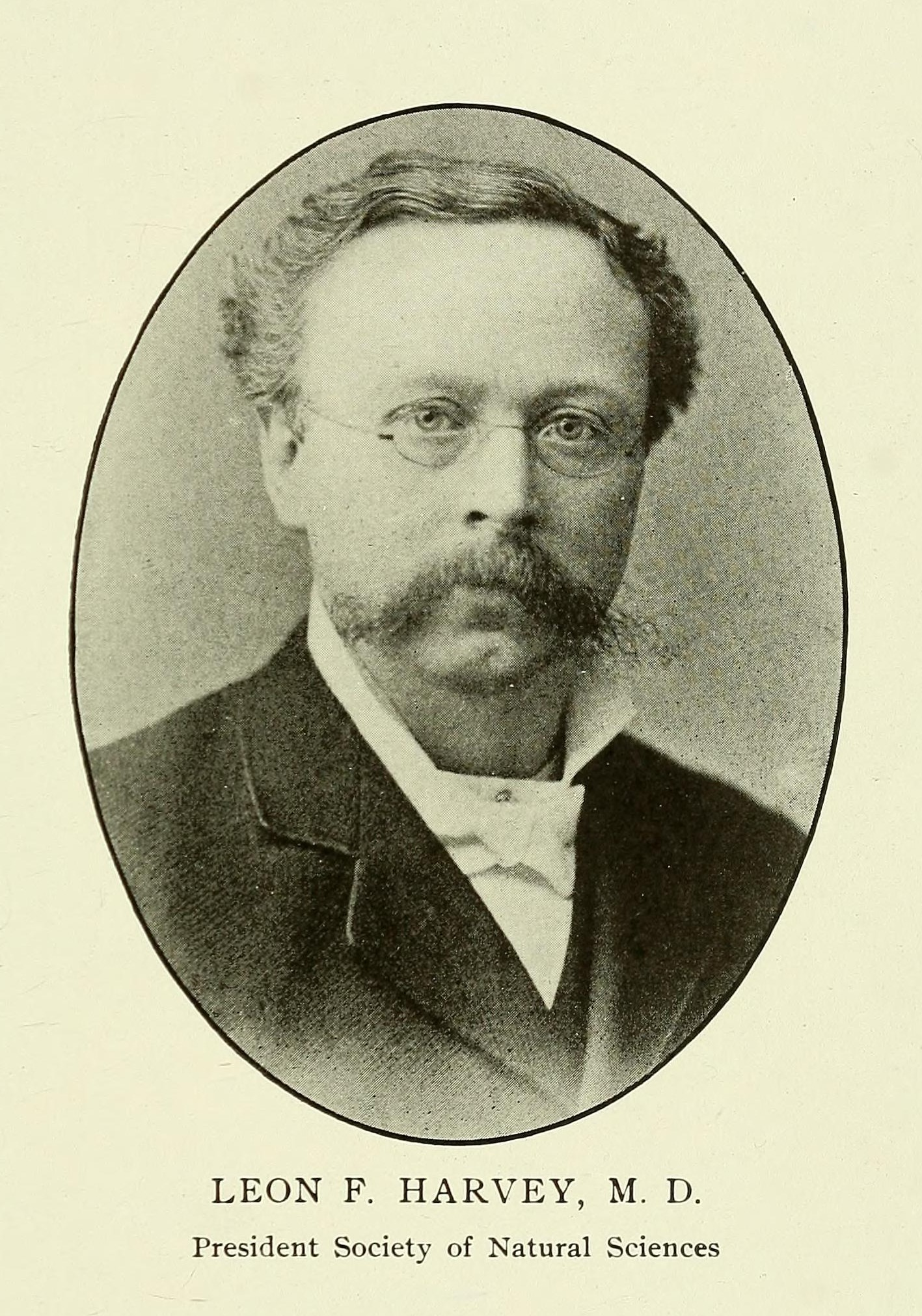
- Portrait of Leon F. Harvey
- Born: October 20, 1837; Buffalo, New York, U.S.
- Died: November 19, 1912 (aged 75); New Rochelle, New York, U.S.

Leon F. Harvey (October 20, 1837 – November 19, 1912) was an American entomologist, physician, and dentist. He was a founding member of the Buffalo Society of Natural Sciences, serving as its first treasurer and later as its president.

== Early life and education ==
Harvey was born in Buffalo in 1837. He completed his medical education at Thomas Jefferson University in 1859, and practiced medicine and dentistry in Baltimore and Buffalo. For several years he managed a provident dispensary in Buffalo. He was an avid amateur entomologist and published scientific articles on the butterflies and moths of North America, including descriptions of new species, such as the white flower moth.

== Death ==
Harvey died in 1912 at age 75, in New Rochelle, New York.
