= Brent Mishler =

American botanist and naturalist

- Born: 1953 (age 72–73); Pasadena, California, U.S.
- Education: California State Polytechnic University, Pomona (BS, MS); Harvard University (PhD)
- Scientific career
- Fields: Botany; Bryology
- Workplaces: Duke University; University of California, Berkeley
- Website: https://ucjeps.berkeley.edu/people/mishler.html

Brent D. Mishler (born 1953) is an American botanist who from was the director of the University and Jepson Herbaria at the University of California, Berkeley, from 1993 to 2023. He was also a professor in the Department of Integrative Biology, where he taught phylogenetics, plant diversity, and island biology. Following his retirement in 2024 he is now Distinguished Professor Emeritus and Curator of Bryophytes, and continues an active research program.

== Early life and education ==
Mishler attended Bonita High School in La Verne, California, and worked as a Ranger-Naturalist for the Los Angeles County Nature Center Unit (Parks and Recreation Department). He received his B.S. and M.S. from California State Polytechnic University, Pomona, in 1975 and 1978 respectively, then got his Ph.D. from Harvard University in 1984, working with Carroll E. Wood, Peter F. Stevens and Norton G. Miller He did his dissertation work on the systematics and evolution of the moss genus Syntrichia.

== Career ==
=== Research ===
Mishler was on the faculty of the Botany Department at Duke University from 1984. He moved to the Department of Integrative Biology at University of California, Berkeley in 1993.He has maintained two main areas of research: empirical studies of ecology, phylogeny, systematics, and development of mosses, and investigations into the theoretical basis of systematic and evolutionary biology. He has published over 200 scientific papers.

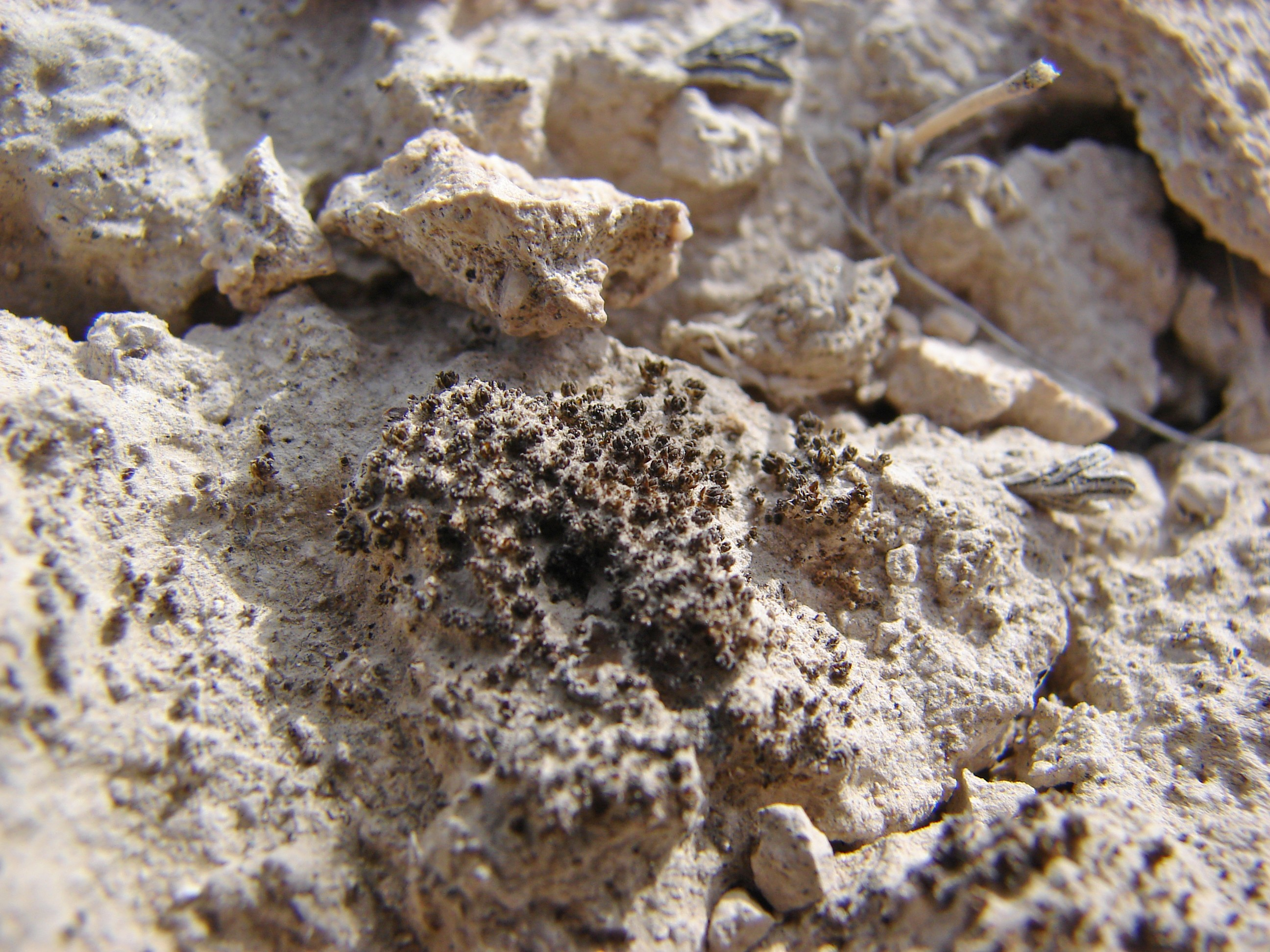
Mishler has studied the diverse moss genus Syntrichia in the Pottiaceae family, including the desert moss Syntrichia caninervis.

Most recently, Mishler has helped to develop spatial phylogenetic tools for studying biodiversity and endemism, using large-scale phylogenies and collection data in a geographic and statistical framework.

=== Species concept ===
Mishler has had a particular interest in concepts of species over his 40-year career, in relation to theories of biological classification in general. He realized early on that the evolutionary processes operating in different branches of the tree of life are distinct enough that different criteria need to be applied to decide when lineages are diverged enough to be called species. He later recognized that deciding which among the many nested levels in the vast tree of life should be ranked as a species is arbitrary and misleading, and began to advocate a rankless approach as was already being advocated for higher taxonomic levels by advocates of phylogenetic nomenclature in the PhyloCode naming system. Mishler argues that the species rank can and should be done away with, to be replaced by a multi-level approach to systematics, ecology, evolution, and conservation. His two recent books (Note: Swartz, B. and B.D. Mishler (eds.). 2022 Speciesism in Biology and Culture: How Human Exceptionalism is Pushing Planetary Boundaries. Springer Nature. ISBN 9783030990299) explore this radical view of "species", and what it means for science and society to move to a rankless, phylogenetic view of biodiversity. Quentin Wheeler and Rudolf Meier note that the Mishler version of the phylogenetic species concept differs from that of Wheeler and Norman Platnick, and that biologists like Ernst Mayr disagree with both versions.

== Reception ==
Werner Kunz, noting that Charles Darwin "did not actually believe in the existence of species", describes Mishler as having an "extreme attitude ... related to denying any existence of biological species", shared with the botanist Konrad Bachmann, that the idea of a biological species is "worn out, hopelessly vague, or even evidently wrong". The evolutionary biologist James Mallet writes that some taxonomists, including Mishler, "even argue that named Linnean ranks, including species, are no longer useful in taxonomy at all".

The philosopher Marco Nathan distinguishes two kinds of pluralism, heterogeneity and theory-dependence. He defines heterogeneity as meaning that species are defined differently according to their attributes, e.g. Mayr's "interbreeding natural populations ... reproductively isolated" applies only to organisms that reproduce sexually, so asexual groups like bacteria need a different definition of species. Nathan defines theory-dependence as meaning that taxa are assigned according to the organisms being discussed and "the explanatory target at hand", so there is no unique or "natural" method for defining a species or taxa at any other level. Nathan calls the "common" labelling of heterogeneity as pluralism by biologists such as Mishler "dangerous" as it overlooks the distinction of the two kinds.
