= Lomatium plummerae =

Species of flowering plant

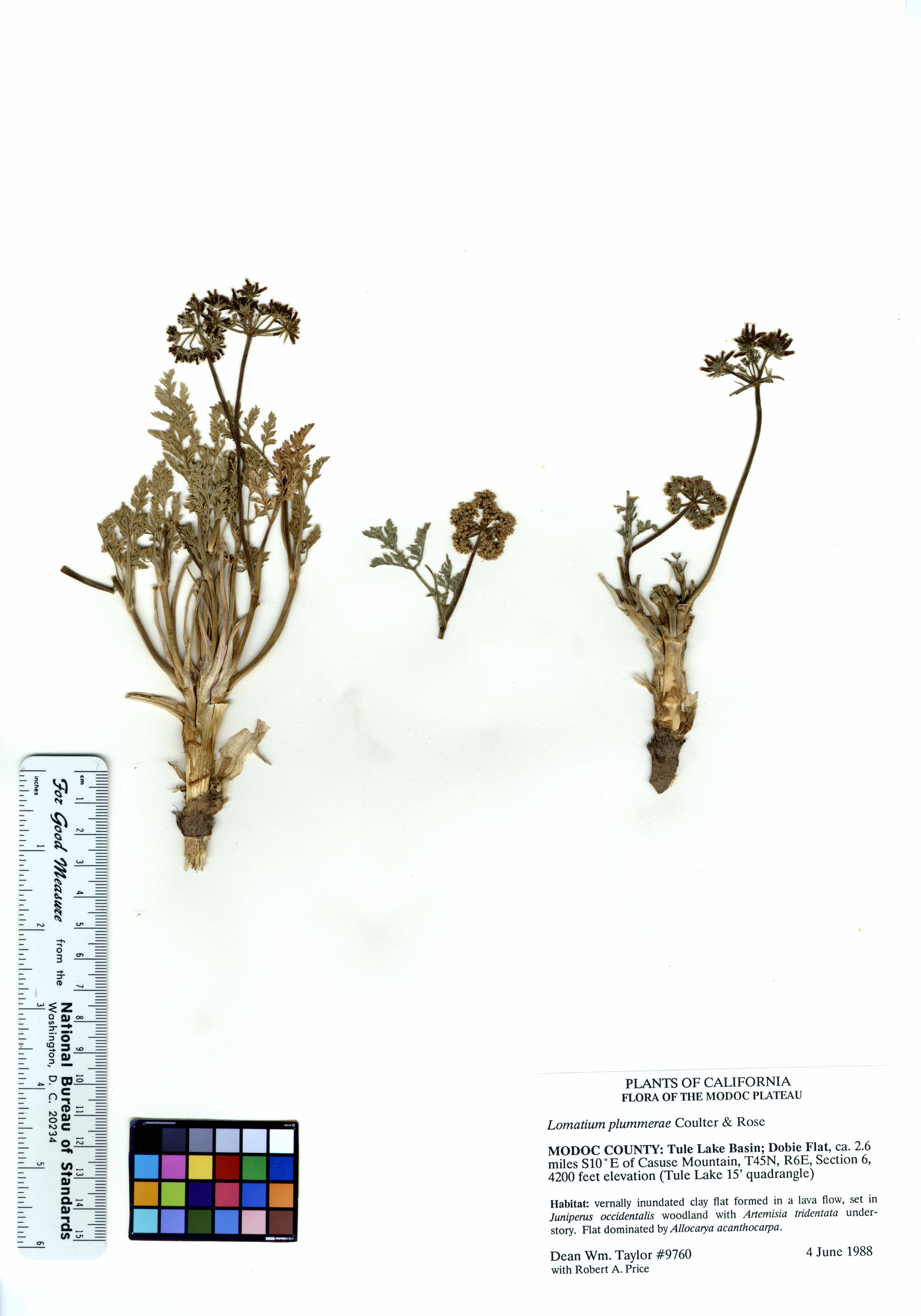

Lomatium plummerae (Plummer's lomatium) is a formerly recognized species of plant in the family Apiaceae. When recognized, it was subdivided into a number of subspecies and varieties. As of August 2021, Plants of the World Online considers the species itself and the variety helleri to be synonyms of Lomatium donnellii, and the varieties austiniae and sonnei as synonyms of Lomatium austiniae, whereas the Jepson eFlora considers the species and the varieties austiniae and sonnei to be synonyms of Lomatium donnellii.
