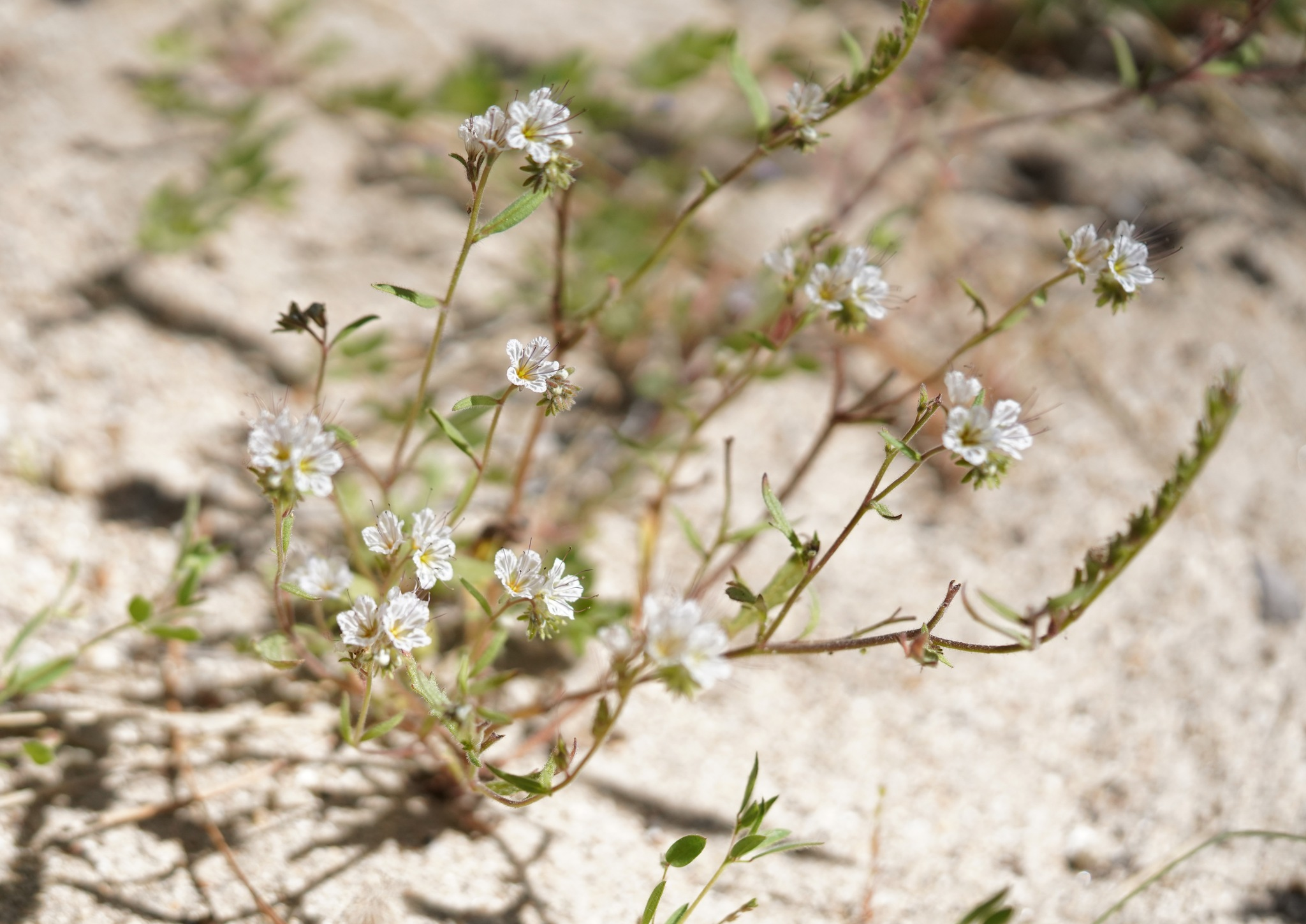

Conservation status
- Apparently Secure (NatureServe)

Scientific classification
- Kingdom: Plantae
- Clade: Embryophytes
- Clade: Tracheophytes
- Clade: Spermatophytes
- Clade: Angiosperms
- Clade: Eudicots
- Clade: Asterids
- Order: Boraginales
- Family: Hydrophyllaceae
- Genus: Phacelia
- Species: P. mohavensis

Binomial name
- Phacelia mohavensis A.Gray

= Phacelia mohavensis =

Species of plant

Phacelia mohavensis is a species of phacelia, known by the common names Mojave phacelia. and Mojave scorpionweed. It is endemic to southern California, where it grows in the San Gabriel Mountains and San Bernardino Mountains along dry stream beds. The name P. mohavensis originally also referred to plants now treated as P. exilis, but the two taxa are currently recognized as distinct species, distinguishable by flower morphology and distribution.

== Description ==
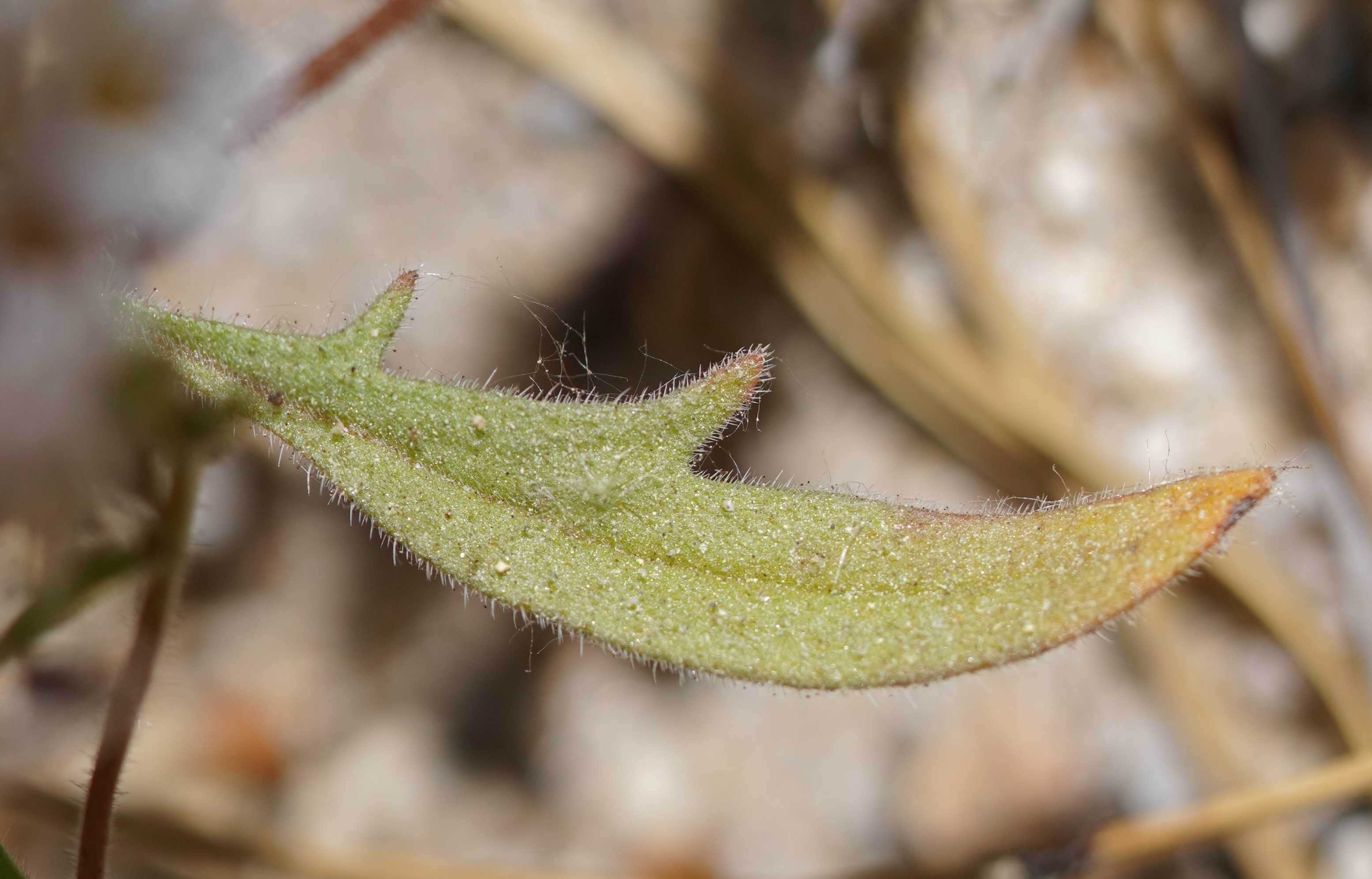
Phacelia mohavensis has lobed or toothed leaves and is covered in stiff, gland-tipped hairs.

Phacelia mohavensis is an annual herb producing a mostly unbranched, erect stem 5–25 centimeters tall. The stems are covered in short, stiff hairs tipped with glands. The leaves are 1–4.5 cm long and linear or lance-shaped. While the smaller leaves may have smooth edges, the larger leaves are lobed or toothed.

Phacelia mohavensis flowers from April to August, bearing flowers arranged in a cyme. The bell-shaped flowers are 5–8 mm long and white with a yellowish tubular throat. As the flower ages, it fades from white to pale blue. Each petal has three veins, which border two large, translucent chambers and join together near the petal tip. The anthers are covered in light brown pollen and are borne on thin, purple filaments that are 5–14 mm long and unequal in length. The anthers project far outside the flower tube, except in the very last flowers to bloom, which often have sterile male reproductive parts. The style is 5–8 mm long and cleft.

The ovoid fruits are 3–5 mm long, covered in short, stiff, glandular hairs. Each fruit holds 4–8 seeds. The haploid chromosomal number is 9.

== Distribution ==
Phacelia mohavensis grows exclusively in the San Gabriel Mountains and San Bernardino Mountains of California, in Los Angeles and San Bernardino Counties. It grows in sandy and gravelly substrates, often by dry stream beds. Its elevational range is 900–2570 m. Despite its narrow geographic range, the CNPS Inventory of Rare and Endangered Plants of California does not consider P. mohavensis to be a threatened species.

== Taxonomy ==
Edward Palmer collected the type specimen of Phacelia mohavensis in 1876, along the Mojave River. Two years later, Asa Gray named and formally described the species, placing it in a group of closely-related Phacelia species called section Eutoca. In 2012, Genevieve Walden and Robert Patterson used morphological and genetic data to propose a reorganization of the taxonomic subdivisions of Phacelia, placing P. mohavensis in subgenus Phacelia, section Phacelia, and subsection Humiles.

In his description of P. mohavensis, Gray also described a variety, P. mohavensis var. exilis, distinguished by its smaller stature and more upright form. Because the variety exilis was more widespread, botanists including John Thomas Howell regarded the variety typified by Palmer's original specimen from the Mojave River to be a rare variant. In 1988, botanist Gregory Lee found sufficient differences in morphology, distribution, and ecology to justify recognizing P. mohavensis var. exilis as its own species, Phacelia exilis. The Jepson Manual separates these two species based on flower morphology: P. mohavensis has stamens that project outward from the flower, borne on purple filaments, whereas the white filaments holding the stamens of P. exilis hardly extend past the flower tube, if at all.
