= Sara Plummer Lemmon =

American botanist

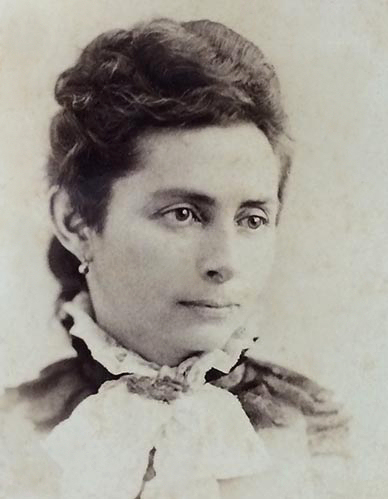
- 1865 portrait of Lemmon
- Born: Sara Allen Plummer; September 3, 1836; New Gloucester, Maine, US
- Died: January 15, 1923 (aged 86)
- Resting place: Mountain View Cemetery (Oakland, California)
- Education: Cooper Union
- Spouse: John Gill Lemmon (married 1880-1908)
- Scientific career
- Fields: Botany, Botanical Illustration
- Author abbrev. (botany): Plummer

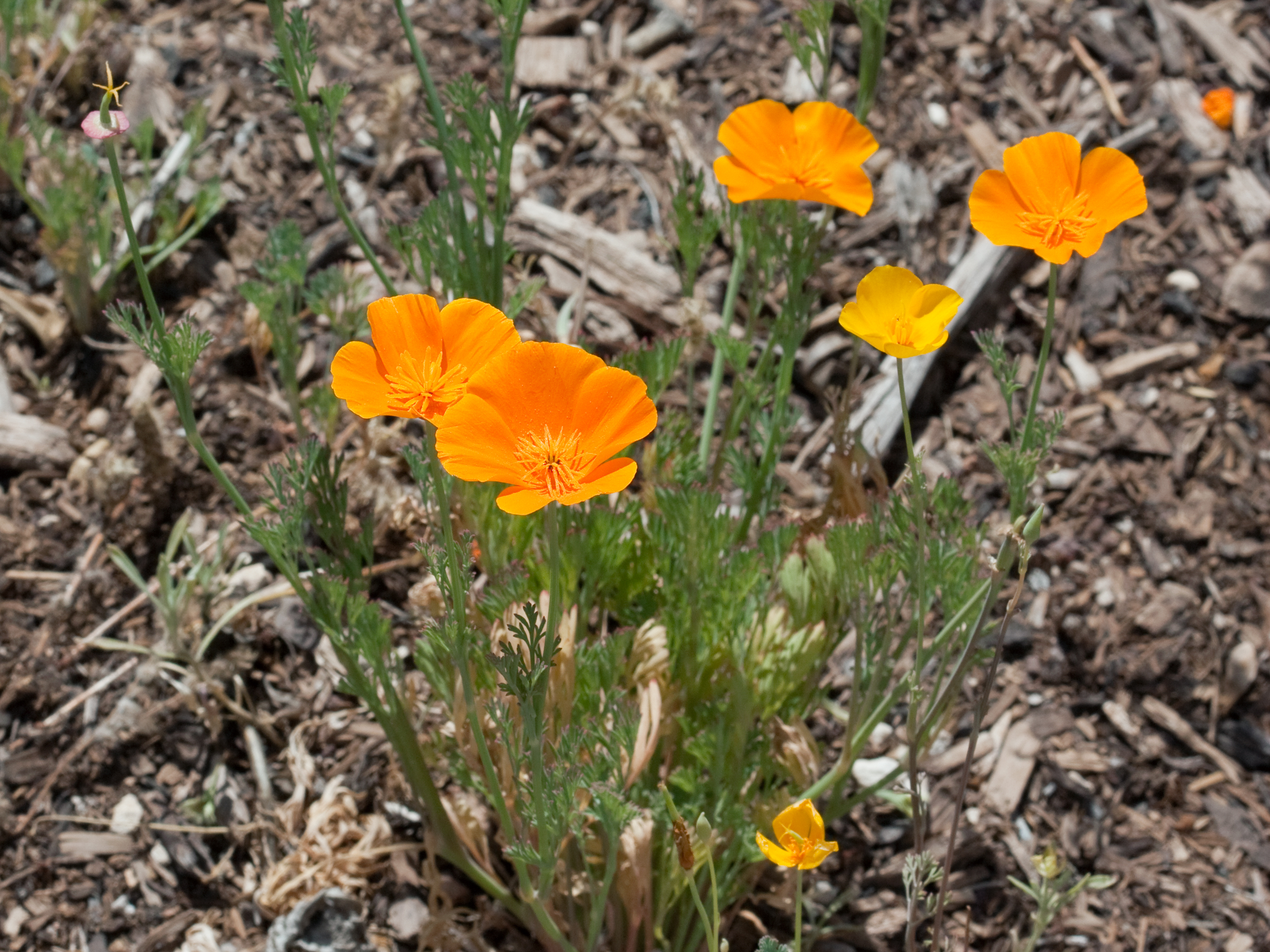
Sara Lemmon wrote the legislation designating the golden poppy as California's state flower.

Sara Allen Plummer Lemmon (1836–1923) was an American botanist. Mount Lemmon in Arizona is named for her, as she was the first Euro-American woman to ascend it. She was responsible for the designation of the golden poppy (Eschscholzia californica) as the state flower of California, in 1903. A number of plants are also named in her honor, including the new genus Plummera (now placed as a subgenus within Hymenoxys), described by botanist Asa Gray in 1882.

== Early life and education ==
Plummer was born in New Gloucester, Maine, on September 3, 1836. She was educated in Massachusetts at the Female College of Worcester. Plummer then moved to New York City, where she taught art for some years and studied at Cooper Union. She also served as a nurse for a year or two during the Civil War.

== Career ==
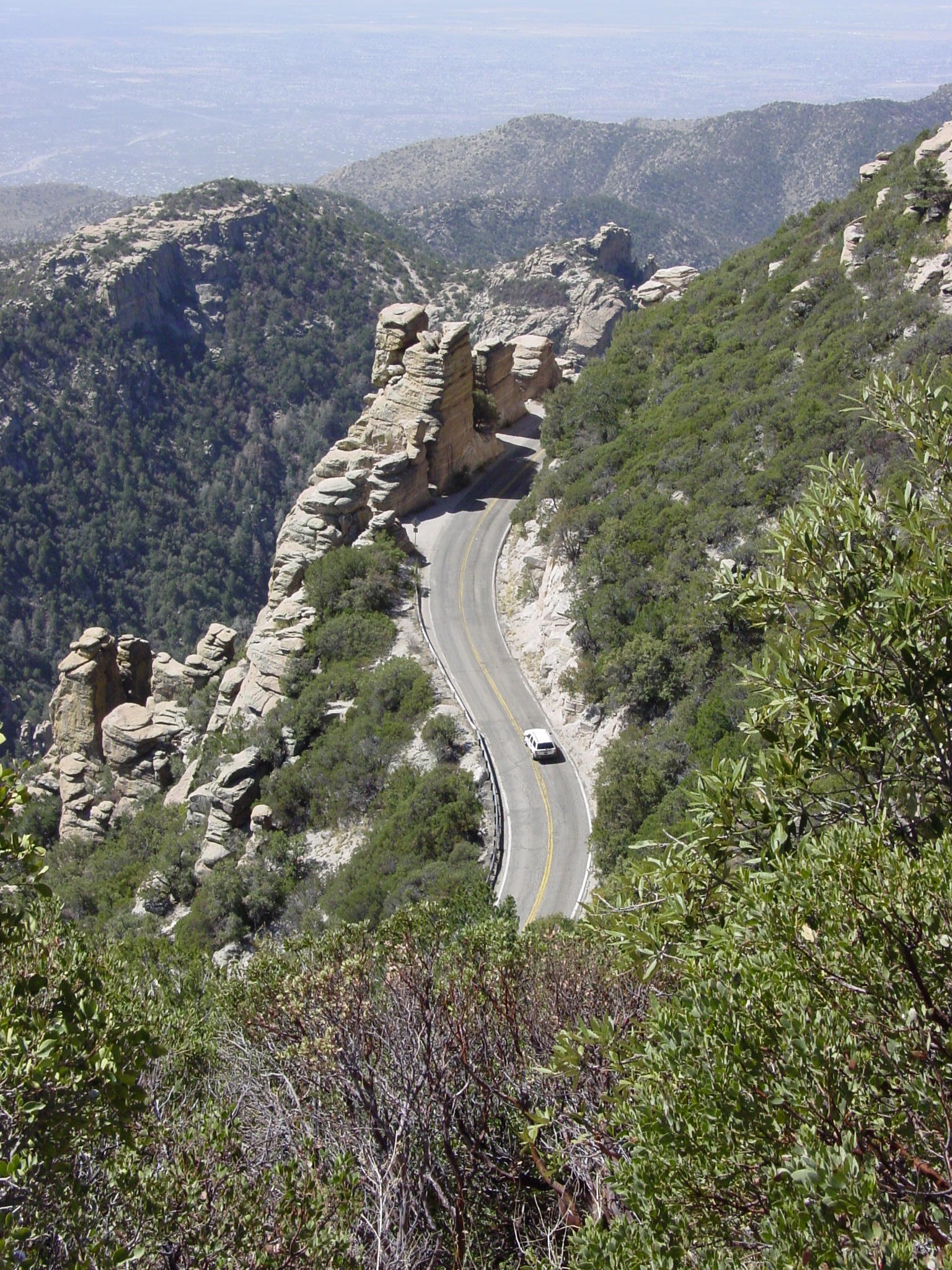
Mount Lemmon, Arizona, named after Sara Lemmon

Having fallen ill in 1868 or 1869, Plummer moved to California in 1869, after hearing from her friend how the trip helped his health. Newspapers of the day described Plummer as "one of the first 'intellectuals'" to move to Santa Barbara. In 1871, she established the "Lending Library and Stationery Depot" with the aid of a friend, Unitarian minister Henry Bellows, who helped her acquire her first few hundred volumes. Operating out of a jewelry store on State Street, Plummer charged $5 membership or 10 cents for borrowing books, sold a variety of art and music supplies, and held cultural gatherings including lectures and art exhibits. She became a member of the Pacific Coast Women's Press Association.

While walking about Santa Barbara, Plummer became interested in botany, and began creating botanical illustrations. In 1876, Plummer met John Gill (J.G.) Lemmon (1831–1908) when he was giving a lecture in Santa Barbara. Lemmon, a Civil War veteran and former Andersonville prisoner, was also a self-trained botanist. The couple started corresponding via letters and Lemmon tutored her in botany. She also sent him a shrub she had found near Santa Barbara, and after a friend of his examined it, named it Baccharis plummerae in honor of her. The couple married 1880, and Plummer took the surname Lemmon. She sold her library to the Odd Fellows to operate, and she and John Lemmon began traveling and cataloging botanical discoveries.

Sara and John Lemmon honeymooned in the Santa Catalina Mountains near Tucson, Arizona, at her recommendation. With the aid of E. O. Stratton, they eventually scaled the tallest peak, which was named Mount Lemmon in her honor – one of the few mountains named for a woman. While on this trip, the Lemmons discovered and cataloged a number of species unique to the mountain.

After returning from their trip, the couple continued their botanical endeavors. The Lemmons co-developed the Lemmon Herbarium at their home at No. 5985 Telegraph Avenue, later donating it to UC Berkeley, where it was eventually merged into the University and Jepson Herbaria. Lemmon continued her botanical illustrations, and served as the official artist for the California State Board of Forestry (from 1888 to 1892), acquiring a national reputation for her work. In 1882, Lemmon discovered a new genus of plants called Plummera floribunda. In 1893, she presented a lecture on forest conservation at the World's Columbian Exposition in Chicago. During the 1890s she also advocated for the adoption of the golden poppy as the state flower of California, eventually writing the bill passed by the California Legislature and signed in 1903.

== Death ==
Her husband J.G. died in 1908, and Sara Plummer Lemmon died in California in 1923. The couple is buried at Mountain View Cemetery in Oakland.

== Selected bibliography ==
- Sara Plummer Lemmon, "The Ferns of the Pacific Slope" (San Francisco, 1882)
  - "Silk Culture in California" (1884)
  - "Marine Botany" (1886)
  - Marine Algae of the West
  - Western Ferns
- and John Gill Lemmon, How to Tell the Trees and Forest Endowment of Pacific Slope (1902)

The standard author abbreviation Plummer is used to indicate this person as the author when citing a botanical name.
