= Rebecca Merritt Austin =

American botanist and plant collector (1832–1919)

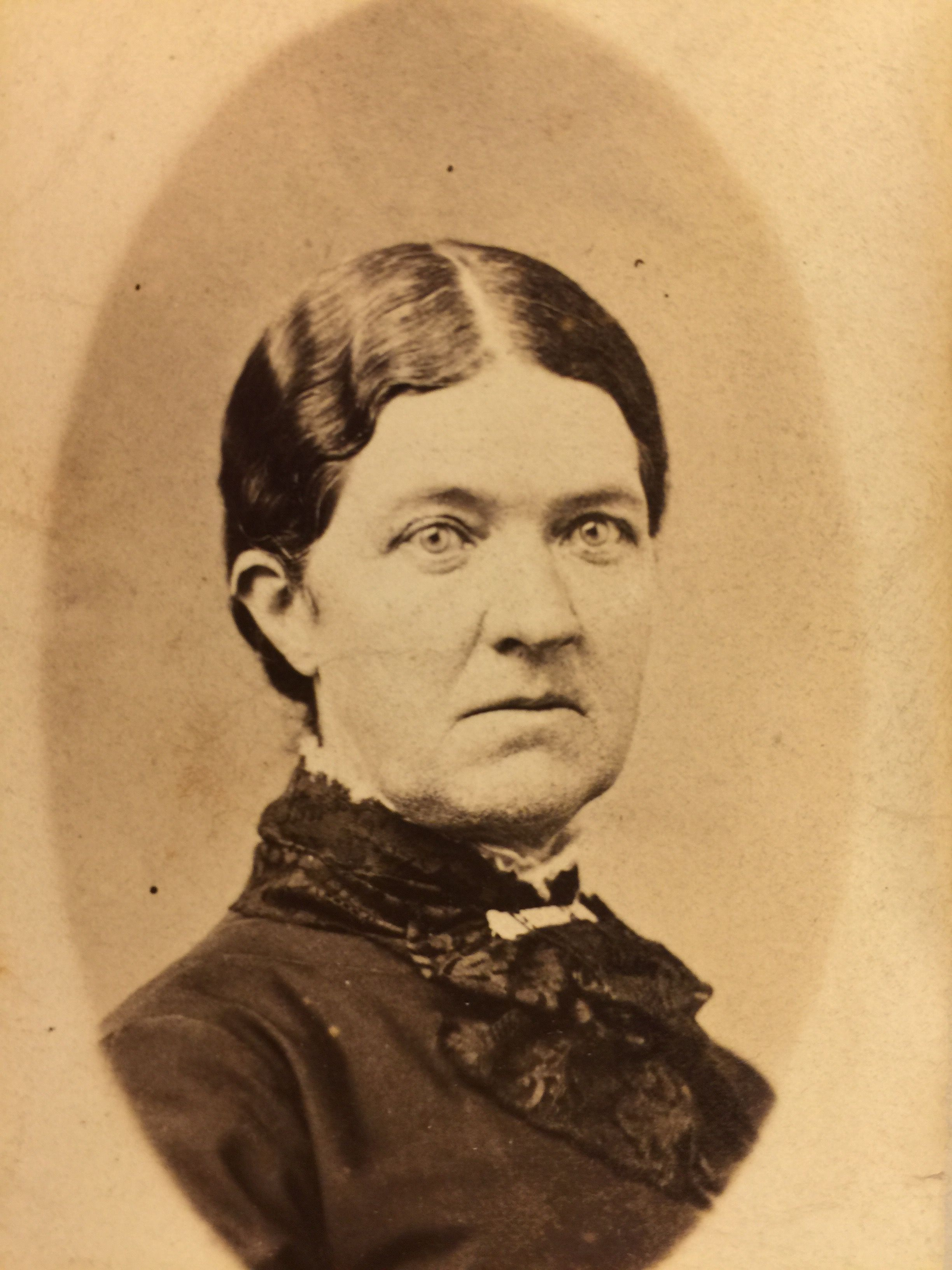
- Born: Rebecca Merritt Smith; March 10, 1832; Cumberland County, Kentucky, U.S.
- Died: March 4, 1919 (aged 86); Chico, California, U.S.
- Burial place: Chico Cemetery, Chico, California, U.S.
- Other names: Rebecca Merritt Leonard; Rebecca Merritt Austin; Rebecca Merritt Smith Leonard Austin
- Occupation: Botanist
- Known for: Botanical research and collecting
- Children: 4

Rebecca Merritt Austin (née Smith, formerly Leonard; March 10, 1832 – March 4, 1919) was an American botanist and naturalist who collected and sold native plants in California and Oregon. Lomatium austiniae and Cephalanthera austiniae are named in her honor. She studied the chemistry, natural history of, and insects captured by the carnivorous pitcher plant Darlingtonia californica, and sold collected specimens to botanists and collectors. Her specimens are included in the collections of the Smithsonian Institution and the California Academy of Sciences.

She carried on a regular correspondence with botanist J. G. Lemmon and others. Her experiments and correspondences have been published or cited by Asa Gray, John Gill Lemmon, William Marriott Canby, and other prominent botanists of the time.

== Life ==
Rebecca Merritt Smith was born on March 10, 1832 in Cumberland County, Kentucky, one of eight children. When she was five her family moved to Missouri: her mother and two sisters soon died. Rebecca eventually attended school in Magnolia, Illinois, and at the Granville Academy in Granville, Illinois. By age sixteen, she was teaching in rural schools.

In June 1852, Rebecca married Dr. Alva Leonard, of Magnolia. They moved to Peoria, Illinois. She learned some medicine from her husband. They had two children: Byron died young, and Mary was born after Dr. Leonard's death. Rebecca lost her savings in the Panic of 1857. She moved to Tennessee to teach, but was threatened and left because of her abolitionist sentiments.

Rebecca and her daughter Mary (later Mrs. Hail of Quincy) moved to Minneola, Kansas, where Rebecca taught school before marrying a farmer, James Thomas Austin in 1862. He served briefly in the Union Army. The family moved to the mining area of Black Hawk Creek in Plumas County, California arriving there on March 10, 1865. Rebecca cooked and washed clothes for miners and helped those who were sick. Rebecca and her second husband had two more children, Oliver and Josephine (later Mrs. Charles C. Bruce).

In spite of the demands of working to support her family and looking after three children, Rebecca began collecting and studying plants. She did "pioneering fieldwork" in studying carnivorous plants such as the pitcher plant (Darlingtonia californica). She studied their natural history, their methods of feeding, and the insects they captured. She was the first specimen collector in Modoc County.

In 1872, she met the botanist J. G. Lemmon, who applauded her work as a naturalist. Through her correspondence with Lemmon she became part of a wider network of botanical correspondents that included William Marriott Canby, Asa Gray, Mary Treat, and Charles Darwin.

Collecting and selling plants became a major source of income for Rebecca and her family. In 1875 the Austins moved to Butterfly Valley. In 1883, they moved to Modoc County, California. Her daughter Josephine joined her in studying, collecting and selling specimens from California and Oregon. Along with Mary Pulsifer Ames, they are credited with giving "the foundation to our knowledge of the vegetation" of northeastern California.

She died on March 4, 1919, aged 86, in Chico, California. She is buried with her second husband, J. Thomas Austin, in Chico Cemetery.

The standard author abbreviation Reb.M.Sm. is used to indicate this person as the author when citing a botanical name.
