= Black moss =

Black moss may refer to:

- Bryoria fremontii, a lichen eaten by First Peoples in North America;
- Fat choy (Nostoc flagelliforme), a terrestrial cyanobacteria eaten in Chinese cuisine;
- Spanish moss (Tillandsia usneoides), a flowering plant, particularly after it has been dried for use as stuffing and decoration;
- Numerous species of dark-coloured moss (Bryophyta), possibly species of the genera Grimmia, Andreaea, Syntrichia, or Cinclidotus;
- Black Moss Press, a Canadian literary press founded in 1969.
- A geographical area of moorland between Diggle and Meltham in West Yorkshire
