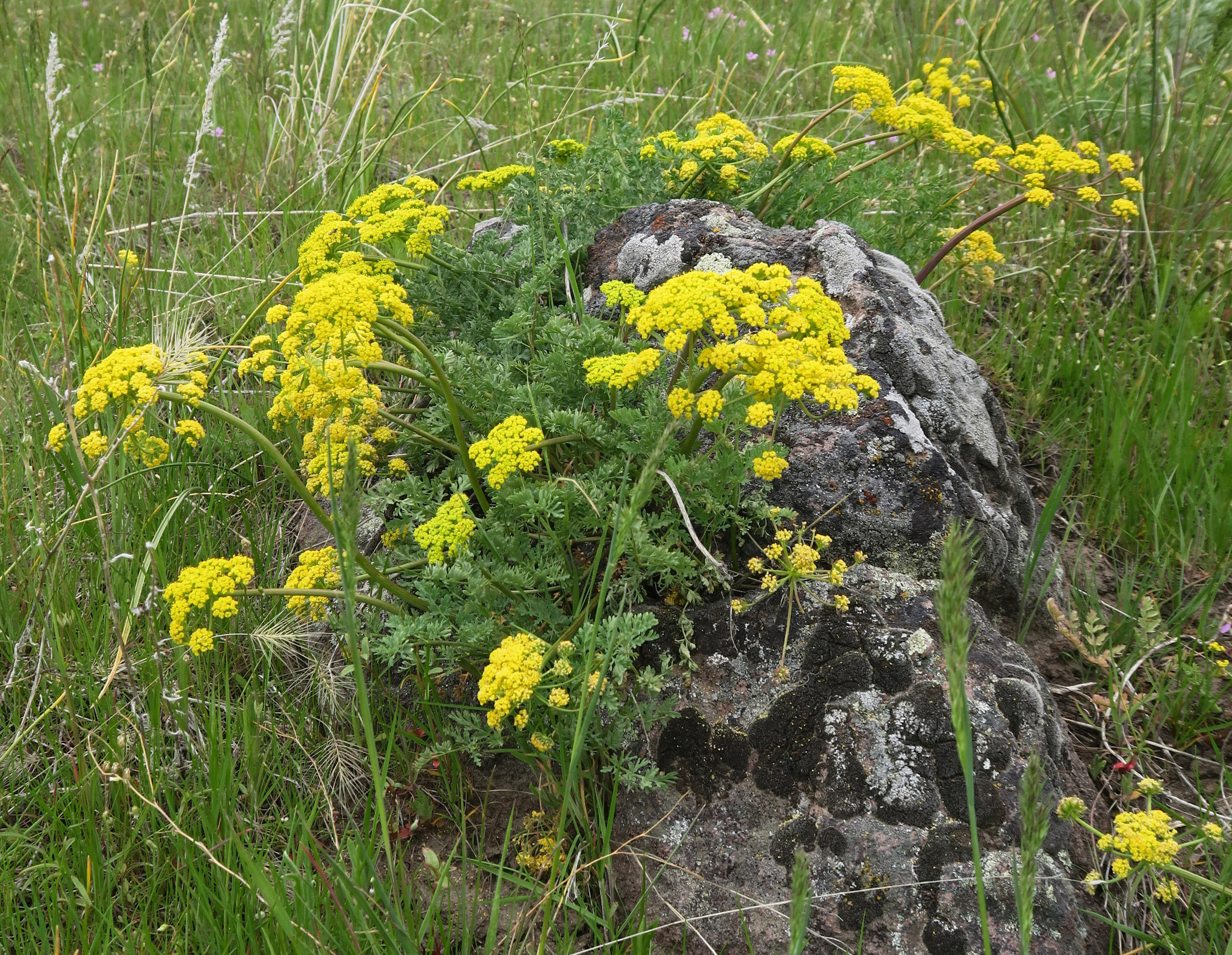

Scientific classification
- Kingdom: Plantae
- Clade: Tracheophytes
- Clade: Angiosperms
- Clade: Eudicots
- Clade: Asterids
- Order: Apiales
- Family: Apiaceae
- Genus: Lomatium
- Species: L. donnellii

Binomial name
- Lomatium donnellii (J.M.Coult. & Rose) J.M.Coult. & Rose

Synonyms
- Cogswellia donnellii (J.M.Coult. & Rose) M.E.Jones; Cogswellia plummerae M.E.Jones; Lomatium plummerae J.M.Coult. & Rose; Lomatium plummerae var. helleri Mathias; Peucedanum donnellii J.M.Coult. & Rose; Peucedanum plummerae J.M.Coult. & Rose

= Lomatium donnellii =

Species of flowering plant

Lomatium donnellii (Donnell's biscuitroot or glaucous desert parsley) is a perennial herb of the family Apiaceae, in the Western United States.

== Taxonomy ==
Lomatium donnellii was first described in 1888 by John Merle Coulter and Joseph Nelson Rose as Peucedanum donnellii. In 1900, they transferred it to Lomatium. In 1889, they described Peucedanum plummerae, which they also transferred to Lomatium in 1900. As of August 2021, Plants of the World Online considers Lomatium plummerae and its variety helleri to be synonyms of Lomatium donnellii. In addition, the Jepson eFlora considers L. plummerae var. austiniae and var. sonnei to be synonyms of Lomatium donnellii, whereas Plants of the World Online considers them synonyms of Lomatium austiniae.
