= Mary Ames =

Mary Ames may refer to:

- Mary C. Ames (1839–1884), American journalist, author, and poet
- Mary Frances Leslie Ames (1860–1914), children's book author and illustrator
- Mary E. Pulsifer Ames (1843–1902), American botanist
