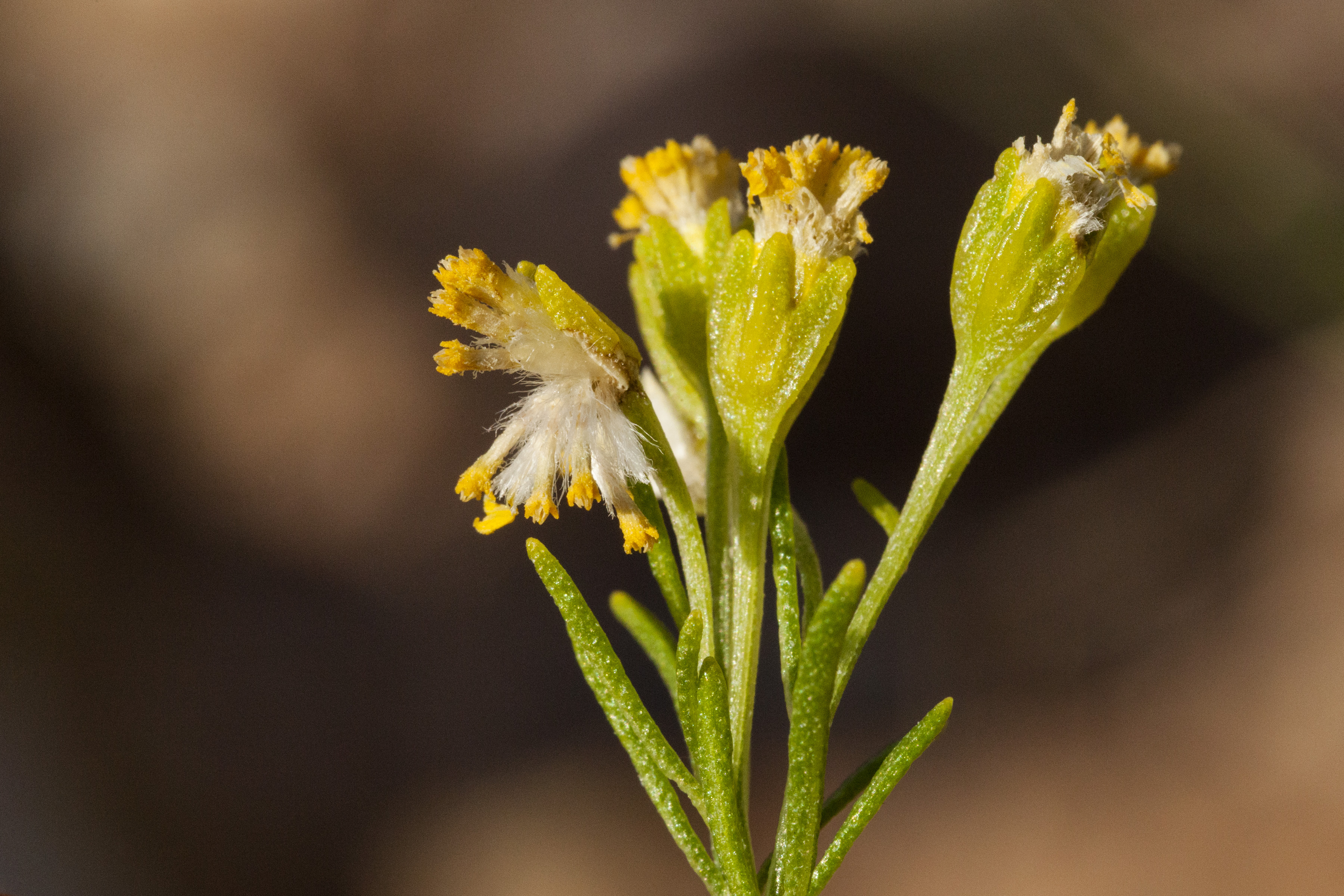
- Hymenoxys ambigens var. neomexicana

Scientific classification
- Kingdom: Plantae
- Clade: Tracheophytes
- Clade: Angiosperms
- Clade: Eudicots
- Clade: Asterids
- Order: Asterales
- Family: Asteraceae
- Genus: Hymenoxys
- Species: H. ambigens

Binomial name
- Hymenoxys ambigens (S.F.Blake) Bierner

Synonyms
- Plummera ambigens S.F.Blake 1929; Hymenoxys microcephala (A.Gray) Bierner; Plummera floribunda A.Gray

= Hymenoxys ambigens =

Species of flowering plant

Hymenoxys ambigens is a species of flowering plant in the daisy family known by the common name Pinaleño Mountains rubberweed. It is native to the states of Arizona and New Mexico in the southwestern United States.

Hymenoxys ambigens is a perennial herb up to 150 cm (5 feet) tall. Leaves have very narrow lobes resembling branching threads. One plant can produce an array of 25–400 small yellow flower heads, each head with 3-5 ray flowers and 6–15 disc flowers.

Varieties

- Hymenoxys ambigens var. ambigens - Mescal, Pinaleño, and Santa Teresa Mountains in Arizona
- Hymenoxys ambigens var. floribunda (A.Gray) W.L.Wagner - Chiricahua, Dos Cabezas, Dragoon, Little Dragoon, and Mule Mountains in Arizona
- Hymenoxys ambigens var. neomexicana W. L. Wagner - Animas + Peloncillo Mountains in New Mexico

== History ==
In 1882, Sarah Plummer Lemmon discovered the species. Harvard University botanist, Asa Gray, first described the species, naming it Plummera floribunda in her honor. Plummera was redefined as a subgenus of Hymenoxys in 1994.
