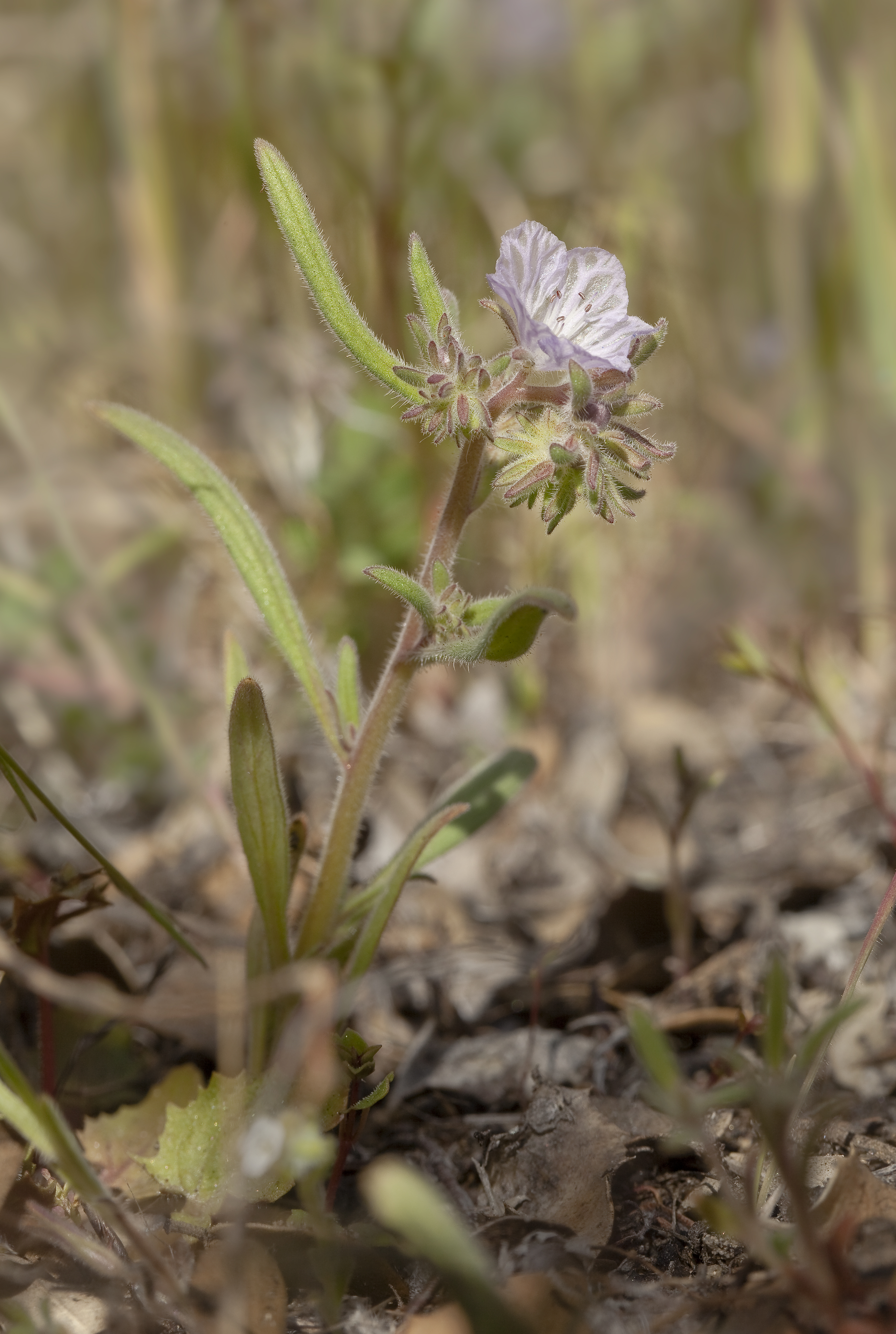

Scientific classification
- Kingdom: Plantae
- Clade: Tracheophytes
- Clade: Angiosperms
- Clade: Eudicots
- Clade: Asterids
- Order: Boraginales
- Family: Hydrophyllaceae
- Genus: Phacelia
- Species: P. exilis

Binomial name
- Phacelia exilis (A.Gray) G.J.Lee

= Phacelia exilis =

Species of flowering plant

Phacelia exilis is a species of phacelia known by the common names Transverse Range phacelia and lavender windows. It is endemic to California, where it is known from the southern Sierra Nevada and the Transverse Ranges. It grows in mountain and foothill habitats such as slopes and meadows.

The Phacelia exilis plant is similar to Phacelia mohavensis and was considered a variety of that species until 1988, when it was separated on the basis of consistent morphological differences and named a distinct species.

== Description ==
Phacelia exilis is an annual herb growing decumbent or erect up to 25 centimeters in maximum height. It is glandular and hairy in texture. The leaves are lance-shaped and smooth-edged, measuring 1 to 3.5 centimeters in length. The hairy inflorescence is a one-sided curving or coiling cyme of bell-shaped flowers. Each flower is under a centimeter long and is pale lavender in color.
