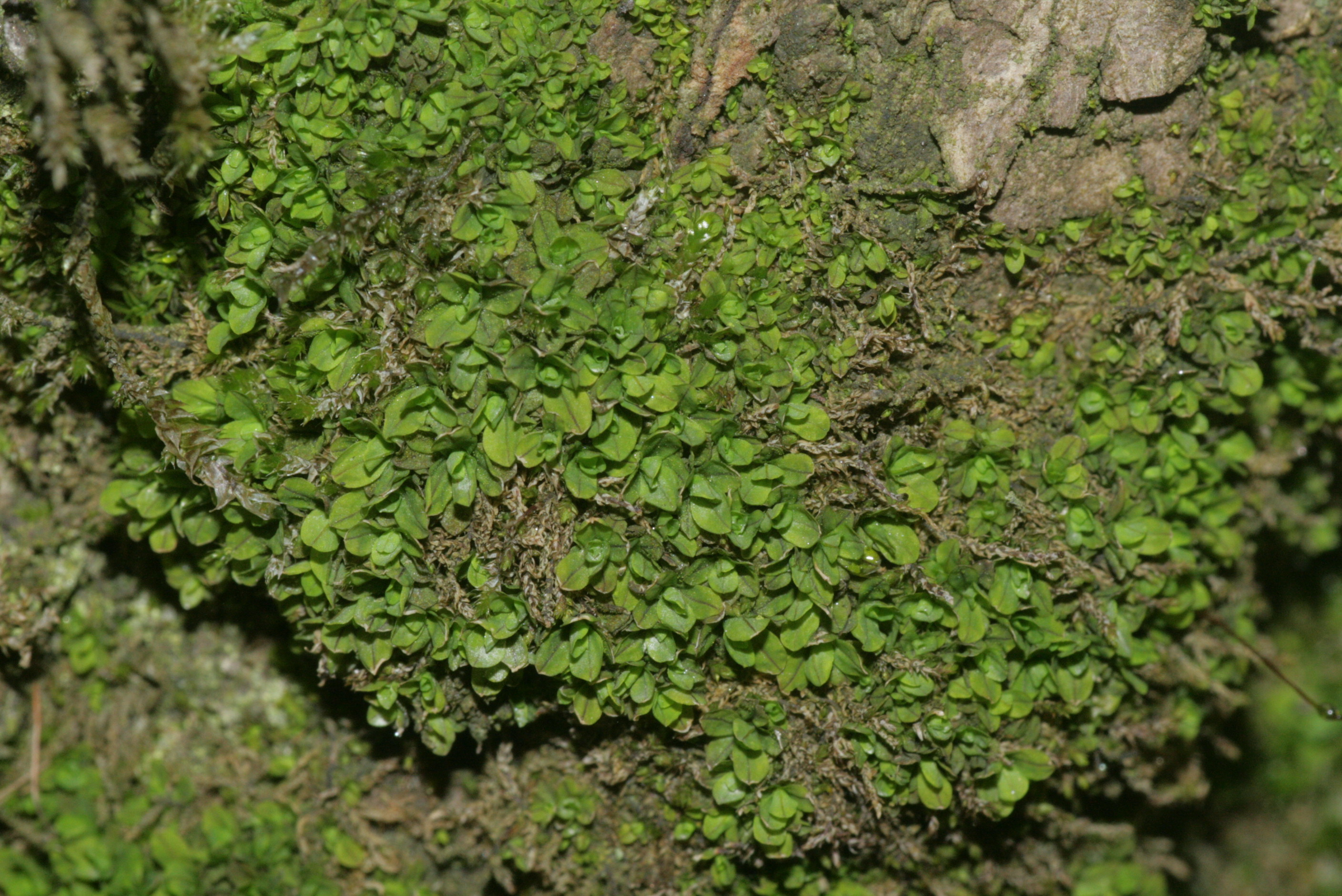

Scientific classification
- Kingdom: Plantae
- Division: Bryophyta
- Class: Bryopsida
- Subclass: Dicranidae
- Order: Pottiales
- Family: Pottiaceae
- Genus: Syntrichia
- Species: S. latifolia

Binomial name
- Syntrichia latifolia (Bruch ex Hartm.) Huebener

Synonyms
- Barbula latifolia (Bruch ex Hartm.) Huebener; Tortula latifolia Bruch; Tortula latifolia Bruch ex Hartm.

= Syntrichia latifolia =

Species of moss

Syntrichia latifolia, formerly Tortula latifolia, and commonly known as water screw-moss, is a species of moss belonging to the family Pottiaceae. Syntrichia species differ from members of Tortula due to synapomorphic leaf qualities, such as different basal and distal cells, as well as different costal cross sections where Tortula has an abaxial epidermis and Syntrichia lacks one.

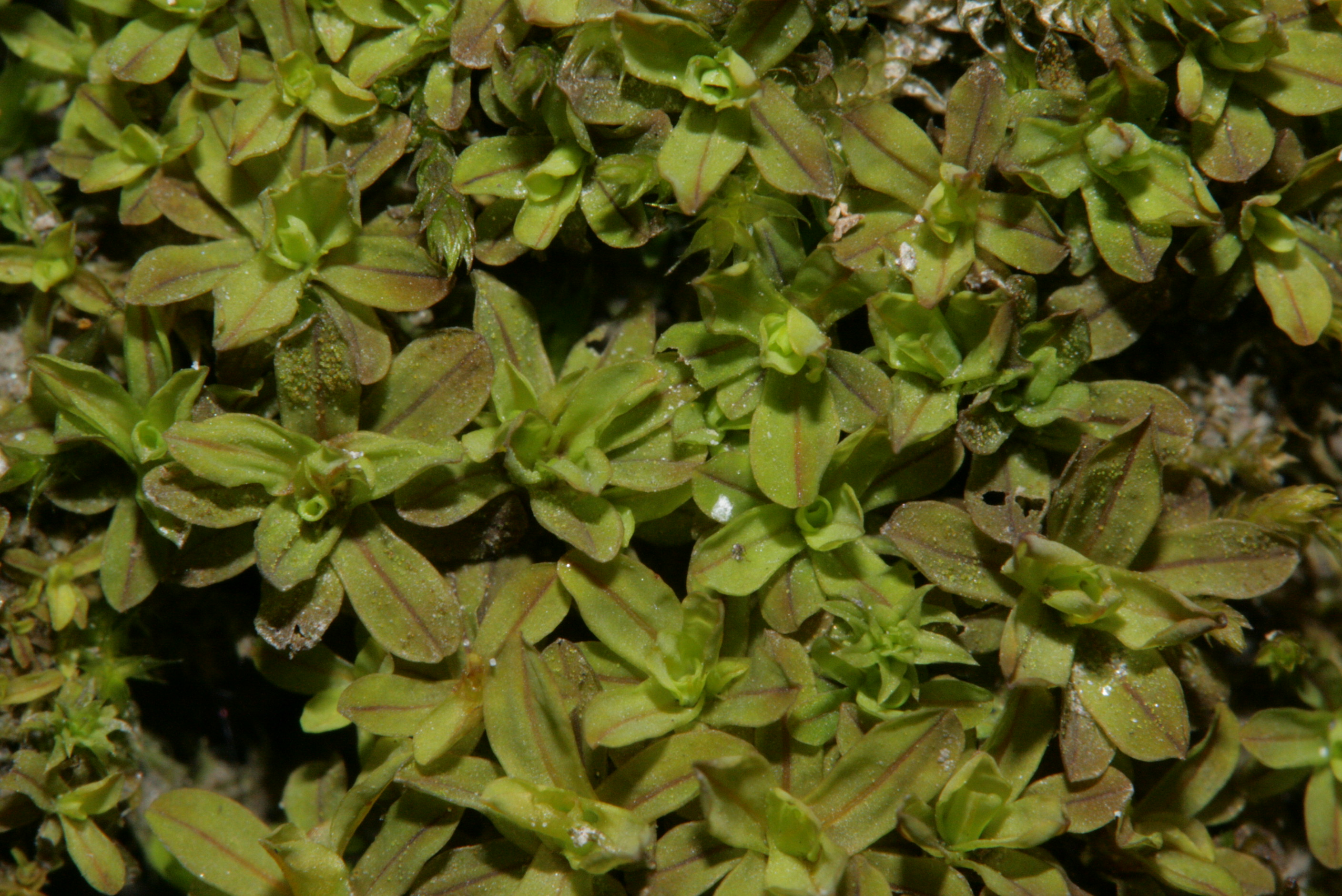
A close up image of S. latifolia shows the varying leaf colour.

== Distribution and habitat ==
It is commonly found in Europe and the Pacific Northwest region of North America. Syntrichia latifolia grows on trees, sidewalks, and concrete.

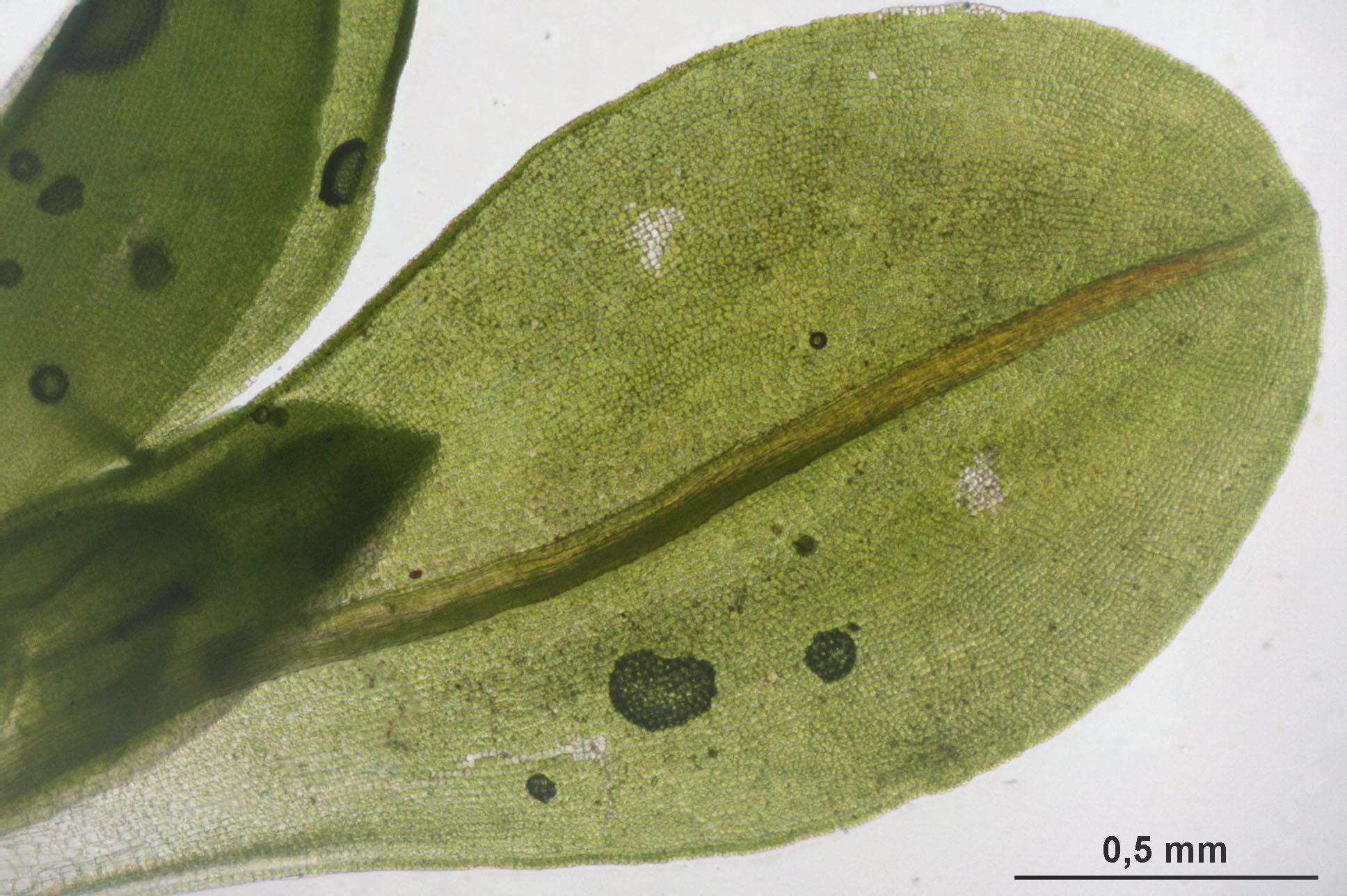
Gametophytic leaf of S. latifolia. Note the costa and rounded leaf tip.

== Physiology ==
=== Gametophyte generation (haploid) ===
Syntrichia latifolia is a small moss. It is a yellowish-green colour, but can also be seen as dull green. The stems can occur as small to large tufts. Stems are found as simple or forked ranging from 1-2 cm but can sometimes be short as 4 mm long. Their epidermal cells are differentiated into 1-3 layers with a central strand present.

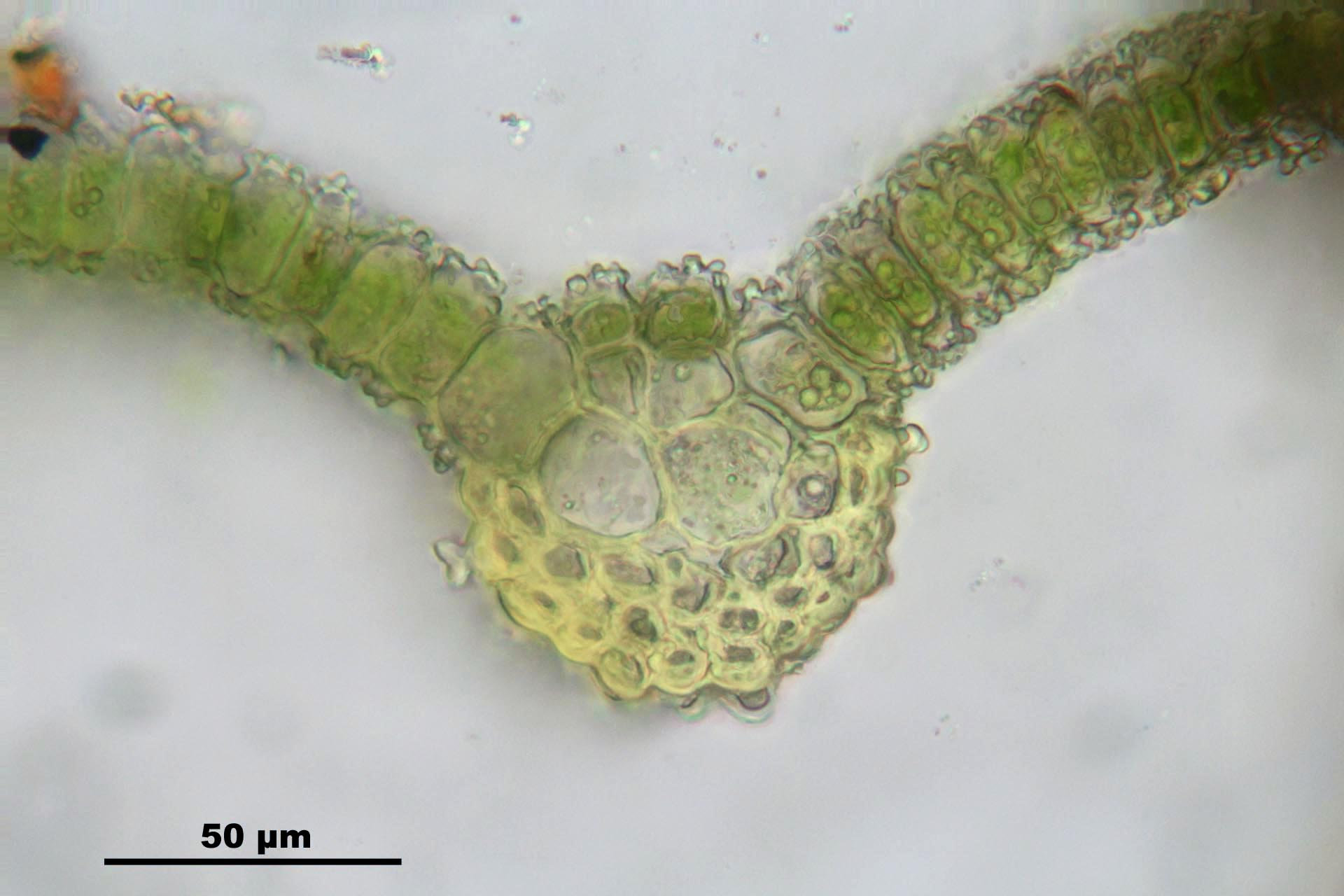
The leaves have a costa that is multistratose, while the lamina is unistratose.

Leaves of Syntrichia latifolia are roughly 1.5cm wide and 3cm long. Young leaves are yellowish-green, and tend to become orange or brown with age. When the leaves are wet, they tend to crowd together and twist, and when they are wet they tend to spread out. The leaves are not fragile. The leaves are obovate to spatulate, with broad obtuse and rounded apices. The leaves are identifiable by their costa, which ends a few cells before the tip of the leaf. The costa is multistratose (multiple layers of cells), while the lamina is unistratose (single layer of cells). The costa is generally strong, and ends just below the apex as a hyaline or coloured awn or sometimes excurrent as a short mucro. There is one median layer of large guide cells, one to three layers of smaller adaxial cells, an abaxial stereid band, and sometimes hydroids, but no abaxial epidermis.

=== Sporophyte generation (diploid) ===
The sporophytes of S. latifolia are relatively infrequent. When they are present, the seta, sporangium capsule, and operculum are red. Consistent with other members of the Bryopsida class, there are arthrodontous (joint-toothed) peristome teeth found at the tip of the sporangium. The spores of Syntrichia latifolia are papillose. The outer layer of peristome teeth are hygroscopic, and when moist, they close over the tip of the sporangium to keep the spores inside. Spores are dispersed when the outer layer of peristome teeth are dry, to increase chances of successful dispersal through wind.

== Reproduction ==
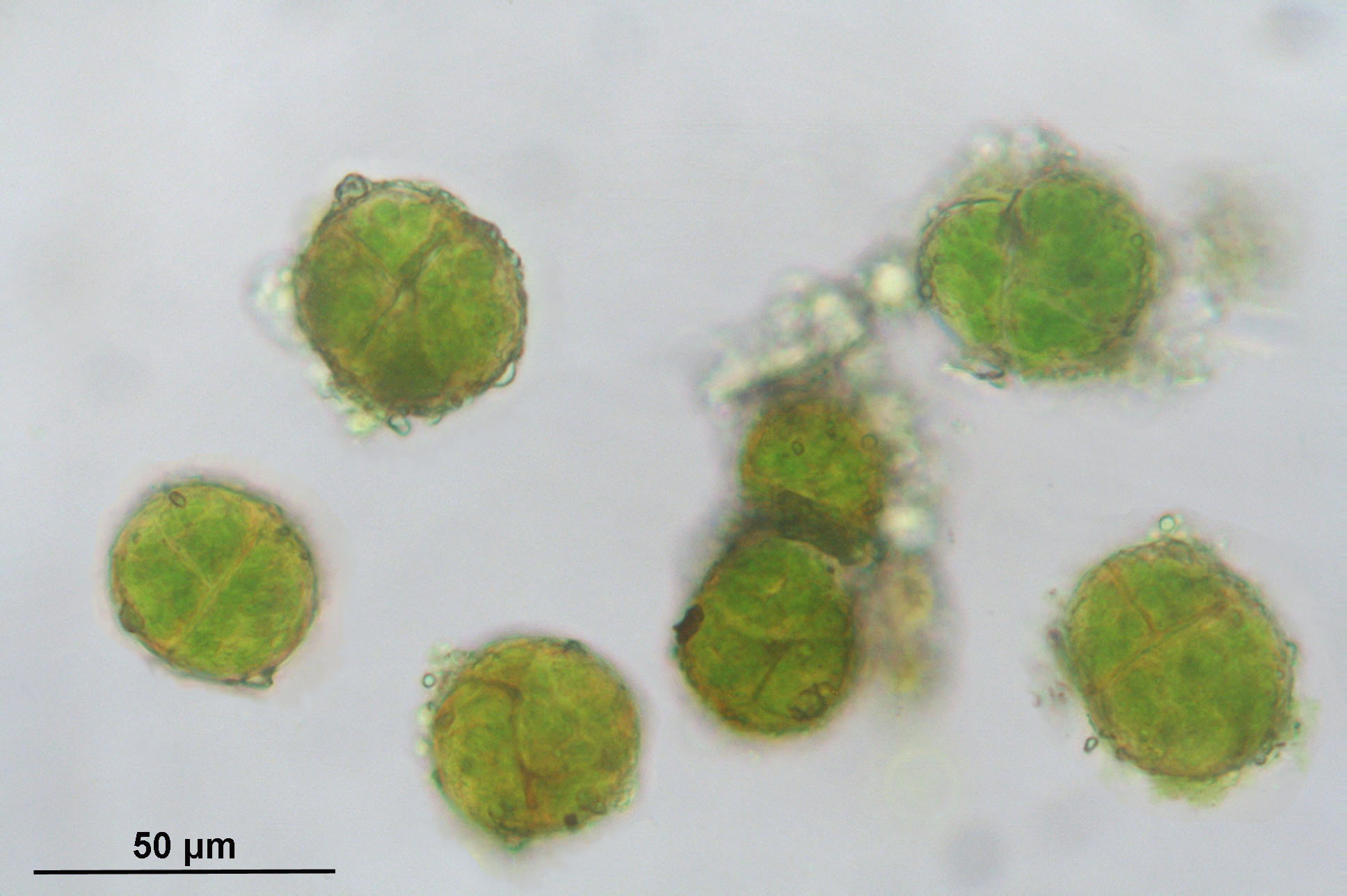
Gemmae produced on the leaf surface of S. latifolia.

=== Asexual ===
This plant engages in asexual reproduction through the use of haploid gemmae. The gemmae are produced on the dorsal leaf surface, though sometimes found on the ventral surface as well.

=== Sexual ===
Sexual reproduction in this moss occurs through the use of haploid spores. The spores are produced inside the sporangium, and when mature, they are released into the wind.

== Life cycle ==
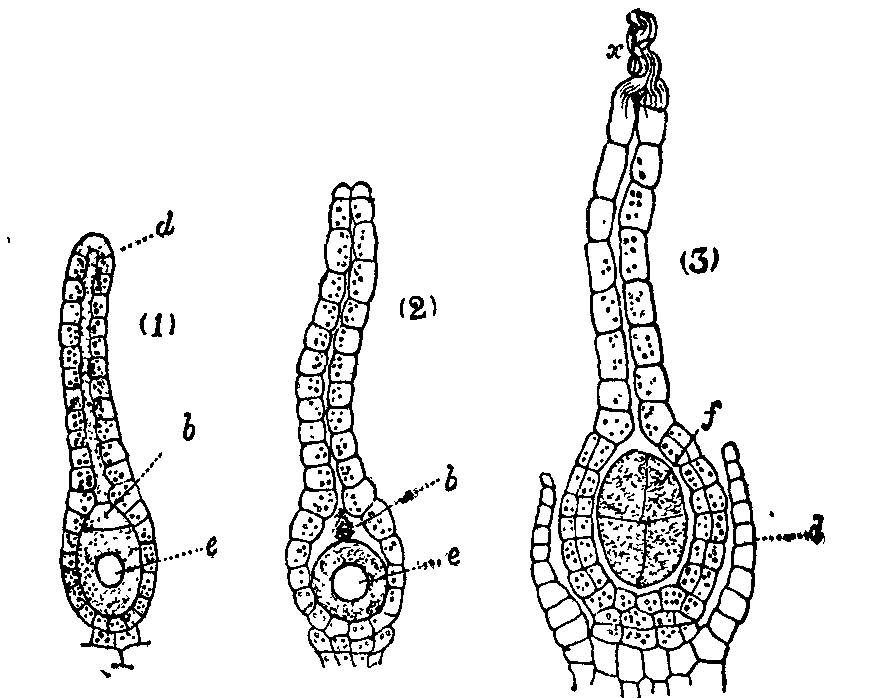
Stages of growth of a sporophyte from fertilization in an archegonium.

When a haploid spore or gemmae lands on suitable surface, it will germinate into a haploid gametophytic generation. First it will grow into a protonematal stage, where rhizoids and protonematal filaments develop and anchor to the substratum. Then, leafy gametophytic shoots develop. When the gametophyte is mature, it will either produce antheridia or archegonia, as it is dioicous and thus only produces either female or male structures on one plant.

When a haploid sperm cell produced in an antheridia swims down the neck canal of the archegonia, it will fertilize the haploid egg inside, producing a diploid zygote. The sporophyte generation grows from the diploid zygote. The diploid seta elongates and the diploid sporangium matures at the tip. Inside the sporangium, spores undergo meiosis to become haploid before reaching maturity. When they are ready to be released and the outer peristome teeth are dry, they are dispersed into the wind.
