= J. G. Lemmon =

American botanist and Civil War veteran

- Lemmon in c. 1880
- Born: John Gill Lemmon; January 2, 1832; Lima Township, Michigan Territory, U.S.
- Died: November 24, 1908 (aged 76); Oakland, California, U.S.
- Occupation: Botanist
- Known for: "Botanist of the West" and founder of Lemmon Herbarium
- Spouse: Sara Plummer (m. 1880)

Academic background
- Education: University of Michigan (dropped out)

John Gill Lemmon (January 2, 1832 – November 24, 1908) was an American botanist and Civil War veteran and former prisoner of Andersonville. He was married to fellow botanist, Sara Plummer Lemmon, and the two jointly cataloged numerous western and desert plants.

== Biography ==
Lemmon was born in Lima Township, Michigan, on January 2, 1832 to William Lemmon and Amila (Hudson) Lemmon, a descendant of explorer Henry Hudson.

He was a schoolteacher for eight years, before attending the University of Michigan. He enlisted in the Union Army in June 1862, and was involved in numerous engagements in the American Civil War. In August 1864, Lemmon was captured by the Confederates, and subsequently held as a prisoner of war in the Florence, South Carolina prison camp and at the notorious Andersonville Prison.

After being freed on March 1, 1865, he moved to Sierraville, California, to stay with family while he recuperated. He returned to teaching, and acquired an interest in botany. Lemmon began corresponding with Henry Bolander at the California Academy of Sciences and Asa Gray at Harvard University, as he identified more hitherto uncatalogued plants. It was only botanical work that gave him solace from the horrors of Andersonville Prison. Gray named the new genus Plummera, now called Hymenoxys, in his wife's honor. Eventually, he became known as "the botanist of the West".

While visiting Santa Barbara on a collecting and lecture expedition, Lemmon met Sara Plummer, a transplanted East Coast artist and intellectual who had developed an interest in botany. The two corresponded for several years, marrying in 1880. They took a "botanical wedding trip" to Arizona in 1881, cataloging many desert and mountain plants, and climbed to the peak of the mountain they christened Mount Lemmon, after Sara, the first European-descended woman to make that ascent.

On their return, they continued their botanical activities, ultimately establishing the Lemmon Herbarium, now part of UC Berkeley's University and Jepson Herbaria. J.G. and Sara lived and established their herbarium at No. 5985 Telegraph Avenue. From 1888 to 1892, Lemmon served as the state botanist for the California State Board of Forestry.

J.G. Lemmon died November 24, 1908, aged 76, in Oakland, California.

== Selected papers ==
- John Gill Lemmon, Recollections of Rebel Prisons
- --. Ferns of the Pacific Including Arizona (1882)
- --. Handbook of West American Cone-Bearers (1900)
- --. Conebearers
- --. Oaks of the Pacific Slope (1902)
- --. Discovery of the Potato in Arizona (1883)
- --. Pacific Coast Flowers and Ferns (1880)
- -- and Sara Allen Plummer Lemmon, How to Tell the Trees and Forest Endowment of Pacific Slope (1902)

The standard author abbreviation Lemmon is used to indicate this person as the author when citing a botanical name.
