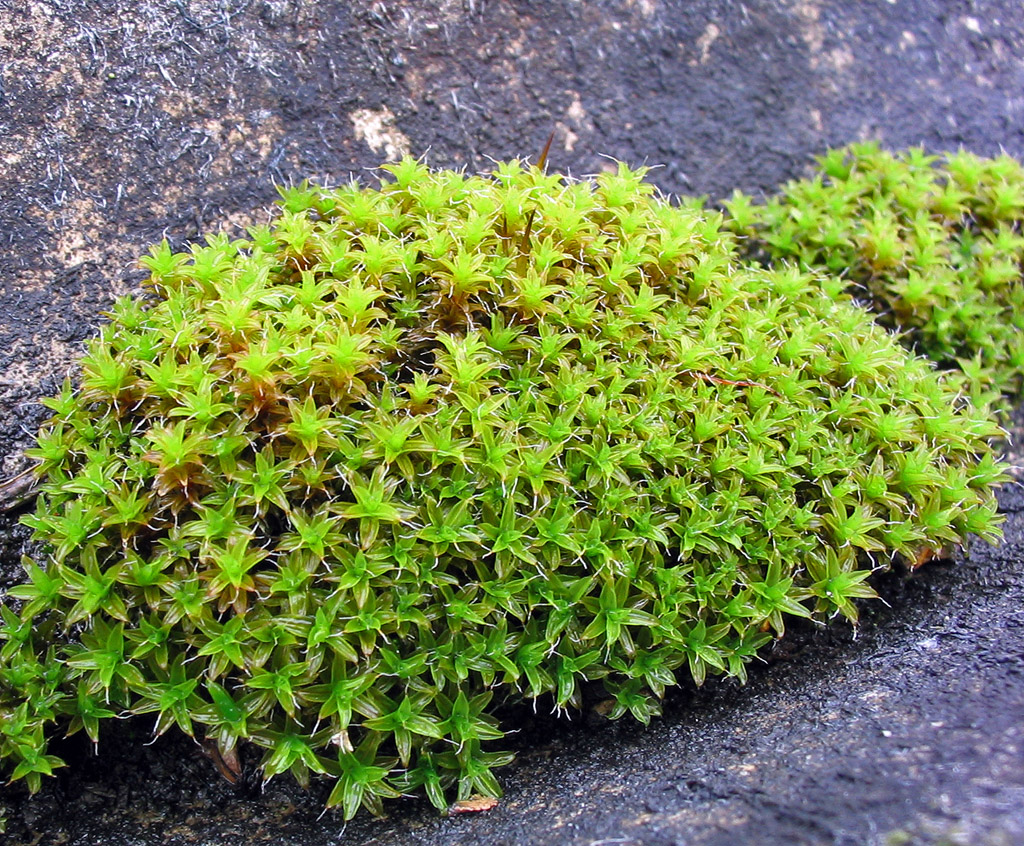

Conservation status
- Secure (NatureServe)

Scientific classification
- Kingdom: Plantae
- Division: Bryophyta
- Class: Bryopsida
- Subclass: Dicranidae
- Order: Pottiales
- Family: Pottiaceae
- Genus: Syntrichia
- Species: S. ruralis

Binomial name
- Syntrichia ruralis (Hedw.) F. Weber & D. Mohr

Synonyms
- Tortula intermedia (Brid.) De Not.; Tortula ruraliformis (Besch.) Ingh.; Tortula ruralis (Hedw.) Gaertn., Meyer, & Scherb.

= Syntrichia ruralis =

Species of plant

Syntrichia ruralis, commonly known as twisted moss and star moss, is a species of moss in the family Pottiaceae with a cosmopolitan distribution. It occurs in North America, the Pacific, Europe, Asia, the Middle East, North and South Africa, South America, and Australia. It grows in many types of climate, including the Arctic, boreal areas, temperate areas, and deserts. It grows in tundra, coniferous forest, grassland, sagebrush steppe, and other habitat types.

This moss forms tufts of erect stems up to 4 centimeters tall. When it is wet it is bright green and the leaves are loose. When it dries the leaves wrap around the stem and it becomes reddish brown in color. It is dioecious. It also performs vegetative reproduction.

Though it occurs in many types of habitat, it is usually not a dominant species. The moss grows on many types of soil, but most often calcareous soils. It tolerates a variety of elevations and levels of sunlight. It may be a component in cryptogamic crusts. It helps to stabilize soil and reduce erosion. It can dry out and become dormant for many years, becoming metabolically active again after many decades of desiccation. It is used as a model organism in studies of desiccation. Within one hour of rehydration it is making new proteins and within two hours it is performing photosynthesis.
