= Lomatium austiniae =

Scientific classification
- Kingdom: Plantae
- Clade: Tracheophytes
- Clade: Angiosperms
- Clade: Eudicots
- Clade: Asterids
- Order: Apiales
- Family: Apiaceae
- Genus: Lomatium
- Species: L. austiniae

Binomial name
- Lomatium austiniae (J.M.Coult. & Rose) J.M.Coult. & Rose

Species of flowering plant

Lomatium austiniae (Austin's desertparsley or Sonne's desert parsley) is a perennial plant in the carrot family (Apiaceae) occurring in a limited area of Nevada. It is named after Rebecca Merritt Smith Leonard Austin, who collected the type specimen. It was formerly classified as Lomatium plummerae var. sonnei. The epithet "austinae" is an orthographic variant subject to automatic correction without publication under ICBN Art. 60.11 to austiniae.
