= Norton George Miller =

American botanist (1942–2011)

Norton G. Miller
- Born: February 4, 1942; Buffalo, New York, US
- Died: December 7, 2011 (aged 69); Syracuse, New York, US
- Education: University at Buffalo; Michigan State University
- Scientific career
- Fields: Bryology; Quaternary paleobotany
- Workplaces: Harvard University Herbaria; New York State Museum
- Thesis: Late- and postglacial vegetation change in southwestern New York State (1969)
- Author abbrev. (botany): N.G.Mill.

Norton George Miller (February 4, 1942 – December 7, 2011) was an American bryologist and paleobotanist. He was the president of the American Bryological and Lichenological Society from 1985 to 1987.

== Biography ==
Norton G. Miller grew up in the towns of Orchard Park and South Wales south of Buffalo, New York. He roamed the woods with the family dog, became an avid birder, and studied natural history, especially botany, under the mentorship of Mabel Hinde James. He served as her assistant and also became an Eagle Scout. He graduated in 1959 from Holland Central High School in Erie County, New York and graduated in 1963 with a bachelor's degree in biology from the University at Buffalo. In 1964 he married Heather Swan. During their marriage of over 47 years, she accompanied him on his bryological collecting trips and collaborated on several scientific projects. In 1969 he graduated with a Ph.D. in botany from Michigan State University. As a postdoc, he was an assistant curator at the Arnold Arboretum from 1969 to 1970. For several years he worked on a research project, the Generic Flora of the Southeastern United States, led by Carroll Emory Wood Jr.

For five and one-half years ending on June 30, 1980, Miller was the supervisor of the Gray and Arnold Arboretum Herbaria and chair of the Herbarium Committee, and then continued on the staff as botanist at the Gray Herbarium and the Arnold Arboretum. In 1983 he joined the staff of the New York State Museum and eventually retired there as emeritus curator of bryology and Quaternary paleobotany He was on the editorial boards of ten journals.

Upon his death he was survived by his widow, a son, and one granddaughter. The Adirondack Mountain Club created the Dr. Norton G. Miller Memorial Fund in his honor.
