= Mary Pulsifer Ames =

American botanist and meteorologist

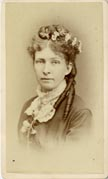
Mary Pulsifer Ames

Mary Ellen Pulsifer Ames (née Pulsifer; 1843 – March 21, 1902) was an American botanist. Along with Rebecca Merritt Austin and her daughter Mrs. Charles C. Bruce, Ames is credited with helping establish "the foundation to our knowledge of the vegetation" of northeastern California. She also recorded meteorological data for the Smithsonian Institution.

Mary Ellen Pulsifer married Charles Cooper Ames on May 29, 1871. She died on March 21, 1902, in San Jose, California.

Astrogalus pulsiferae is named after her.
