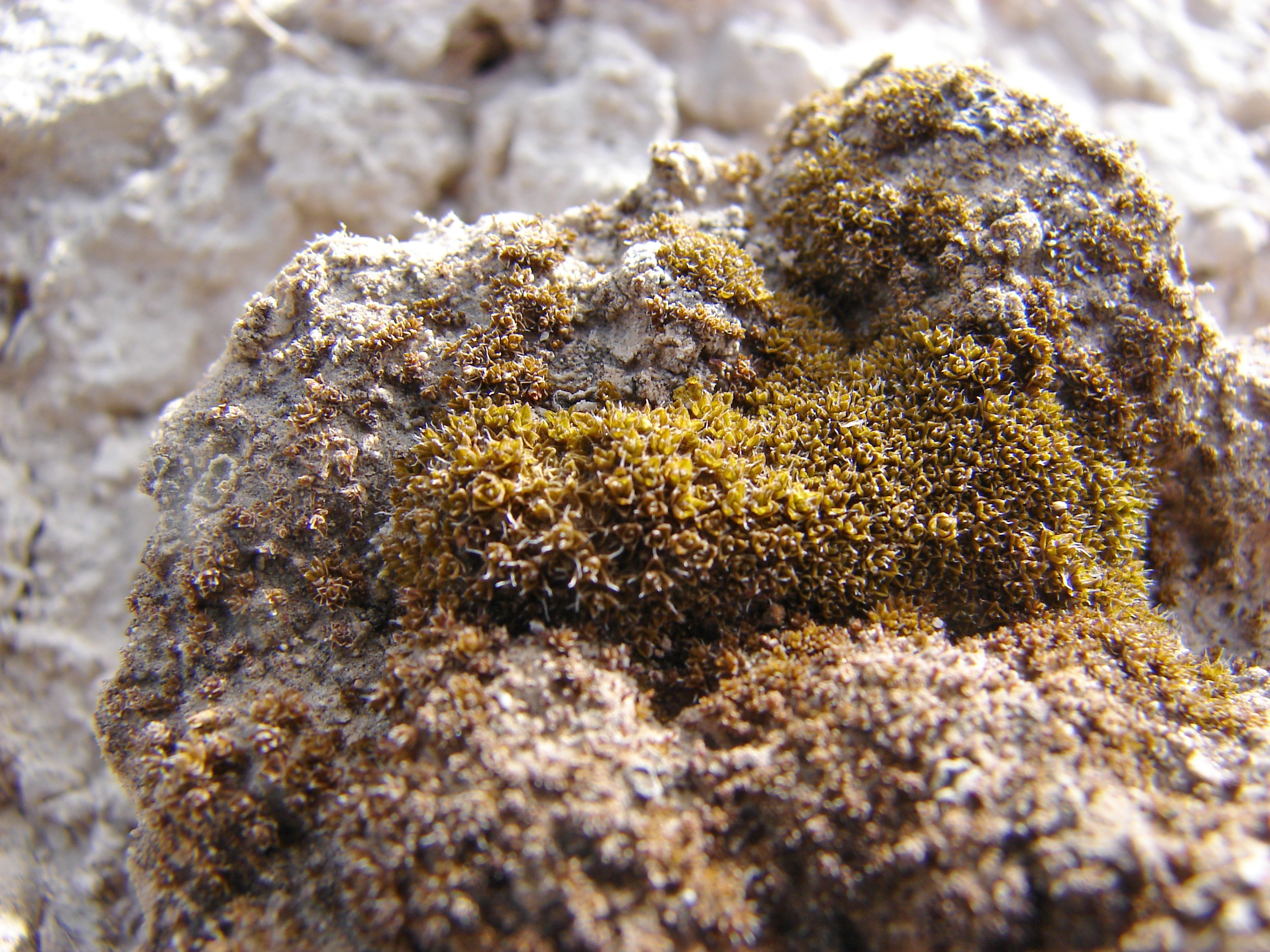
- Syntrichia caninervis

Conservation status
- Least Concern (IUCN 3.1) (Europe regional assessment)

- Secure (NatureServe)

Scientific classification
- Kingdom: Plantae
- Division: Bryophyta
- Class: Bryopsida
- Subclass: Dicranidae
- Order: Pottiales
- Family: Pottiaceae
- Genus: Syntrichia
- Species: S. caninervis

Binomial name
- Syntrichia caninervis (Mitt.) Broth.

Synonyms
- Barbula bornmuelleri (Schiffn.) Paris; Barbula caninervis (Mitt.) A.Jaeger; Barbula desertorum (Broth.) Paris; Grimmia cucullata J.X.Luo - P.C.Wu; Syntrichia desertorum (Broth.) J.J.Amann. Syntrichia pseudodesertorum (J.Froehl.) S.Agnew - Vondr. Tortula bistratosa Tortula bornmuelleri Schiffn. Tortula caninervis subsp. caninervis ortula caninervis (Mitt.) Broth. Tortula desertorum Broth. Tortula pseudodesertorum J.Froehl. Turula saharae Trab.

= Syntrichia caninervis =

Steppe Screw Moss

Species of plant

Syntrichia caninervis, also known as steppe screw moss, is a desert moss species distributed throughout the world. As an extremophile, it is able to withstand desiccation under dry conditions with little access to water and is commonly found in hypolithic communities. It makes use of a novel adaptation to the desert environment to harvest and collect water sources such as dew, fog, snow, and rain, using tiny hairs instead of roots. In laboratory experiments, S. caninervis has shown the ability to survive in a simulated Martian environment.

== Description ==
The plant was first described by English bryologist William Mitten (1819–1906) to the Linnean Society of London in May 1858, with a description published in their journal in February 1859. It belongs to the Syntrichia genus and the Pottiaceae family. It is commonly known as steppe screw moss.

== Distribution and habitat ==
S. caninervis has a widespread global distribution and is an extremophile commonly found in extreme desert environments and hypolithic communities with the capacity to withstand desiccation under dry conditions. It has been observed growing in China, Mongolia, Siberia, central and southwestern Asia, Europe, and North America. In Tibet, Antarctica, and circumpolar regions, it is part of the biological soil crust, which is a resilient type of ground cover often found in arid lands. In North America, the plant is found throughout the western and northwestern United States and in two western Canadian provinces. In the United States, it is found as far east as New Mexico, Colorado, Wyoming and Montana, all the way through Idaho, Utah, Arizona, and Nevada, and as far west as California, Oregon, and Washington. Two of the most common plant communities in the United States are found in the Mojave Desert and in the Columbia River drainage basin. In Canada, it is found in British Columbia and Alberta.

== Extremophile characteristics ==
=== Drought tolerance ===
S. caninervis is well-known for its ability to tolerate drought conditions, making it well-adapted to desert environments. Among these adaptions is its tiny hairs on the leaves that allow it to exploit multiple different sources of water, such as dew, fog, snow, and rain. Another example is its ability to photosynthesize once remoistened after desiccation.

=== Extreme temperature tolerance ===
Research has shown that S. caninervis can survive freezing temperatures as low as −196 °C (−320.8 °F) (in liquid nitrogen) for up to 30 days. It has also demonstrated the ability to withstand storage at −80 °C (−112 °F) for up to 5 years. In both cases, the moss was able to regenerate upon thawing, with dehydrated specimens showing faster recovery compared to hydrated ones.

=== Radiation resistance ===
S. caninervis exhibits remarkable tolerance to gamma radiation. It can survive exposure to doses of up to 500 Gy, which is lethal to most plants and far exceeds the lethal dose for humans (around 50 Gy). Some studies have even suggested that exposure to 500 Gy of gamma radiation may promote the plant's growth.

=== Simulated Martian conditions ===
In laboratory experiments, S. caninervis has demonstrated the ability to survive simulated Martian conditions. These conditions included an atmosphere composed of 95% carbon dioxide, temperature fluctuations between −60 and 20 °C (−76 and 68 °F), high levels of UV radiation, and low atmospheric pressure. Dried moss plants achieved a 100% regeneration rate within 30 days after being subjected to these conditions for up to 7 days.

== Varieties ==
The Global Biodiversity Information Facility lists the following five varieties for Syntrichia caninervis:

- Syntrichia caninervis var. abranchesii (Luisier) R.H.zander
- Syntrichia caninervis var. astrakhanica Ignatov, Ignatova - Suragina
- Syntrichia caninervis var. caninervis Mitt.
- Syntrichia caninervis var. gypsophila (J.J.Amann ex G.Roth) Ochyra
- Syntrichia caninervis var. pseudodesertorum (Vondr.) M.T.Gallego
