= University and Jepson Herbaria =

Herbarium

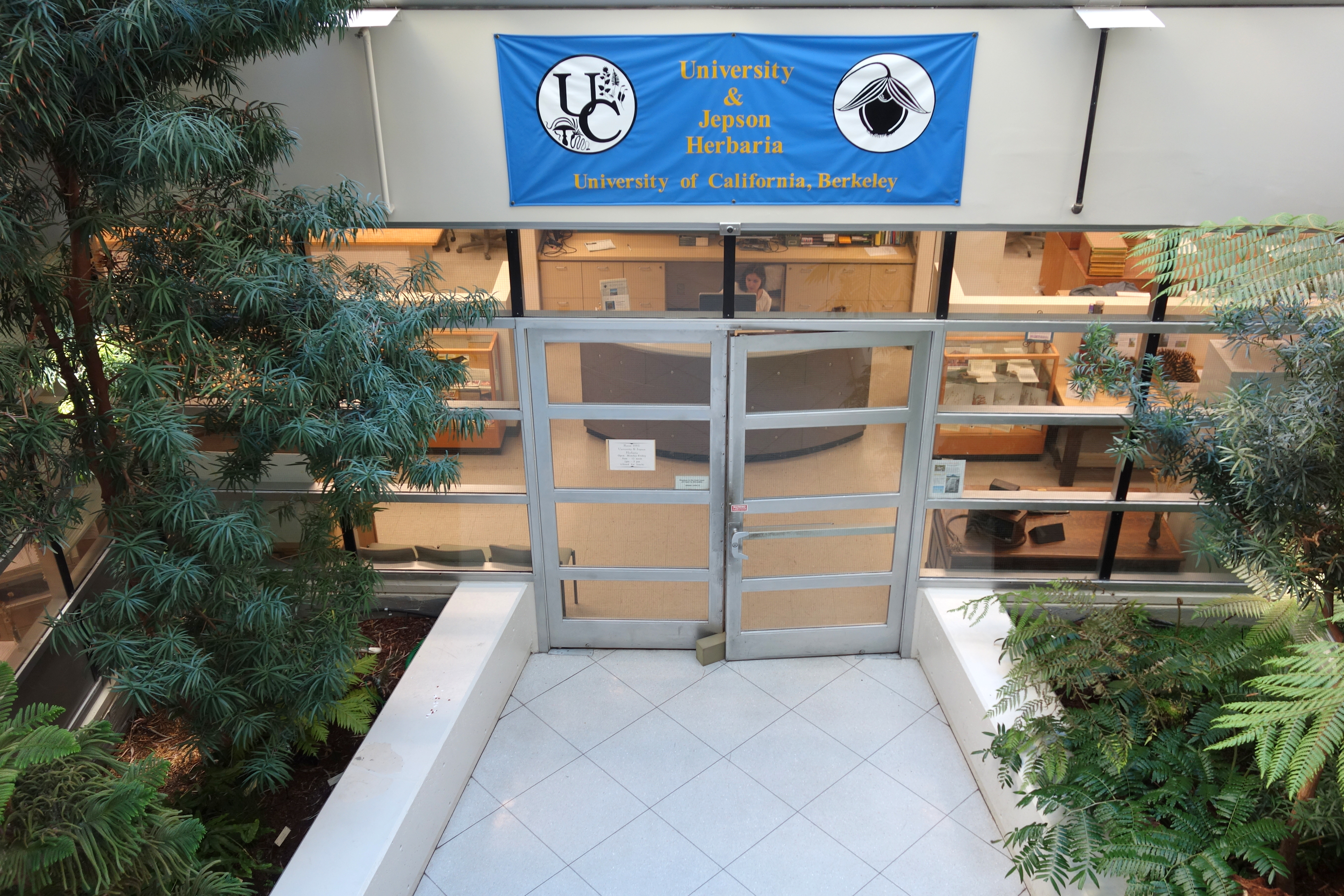
The University and Jepson Herbaria at the University of California, Berkeley

The University and Jepson Herbaria are two herbaria that share a joint facility at the University of California, Berkeley holding over 2,200,000 botanical specimens, the largest such collection on the US West Coast. These botanical natural history museums are on the ground floor of the Valley Life Sciences Building on the main campus of the university in Berkeley, California. There are ancillary collections such as the Marine Algal Collection, Fruit & Cone Collection, Horticultural Herbarium and Spirit Collection. The herbaria hold many type specimens, especially of Western North American and Pacific Rim plants. Holotypes are maintained separately for both herbaria. The Charterhouse School Herbarium is housed separately within the University Herbarium. The Jepson Herbarium runs a series of workshops and public programs focusing on botanical education and the flora of California throughout the year.

== University Herbarium ==
Founded in 1890 with the new Department of Botany, the focus of the University Herbarium is worldwide and includes vascular plants, bryophytes, algae, and fungi. Originally located in South Hall (UC Berkeley) the University herbarium grew rapidly and now contains over 2.2 million specimens. Although not officially named 'Director', William Albert Setchell, whose primary interest was marine algae, officially established the University Herbarium and was chair of the Botany Department. He was succeeded in 1933 by Herbert L. Mason in 1933, Lincoln Constance in 1963 and Robert Ornduff in 1975. In 1982, Thomas Duncan as Director lead ambitious digitization efforts. These efforts were furthered with the appointment of Brent Mishler (a bryologist and Professor in the Department of Integrative Biology) as Director in 1993. Under Mishler's leadership the Consortium of California Herbaria database was established in 2003 to serve as a gateway to information from California vascular plant specimens that are housed in herbaria throughout the state. The Herbaria currently have over 1,000,000 digitized specimens with a combined total for the consortium of over 2 million specimens.

== Directors ==
- William Albert Setchell (informally; –1933)
- Herbert L. Mason 1933-1966
- Lincoln Constance (1966-1975)
- Robert Ornduff (1975-1982)
- Thomas Duncan (1982-1993)
- Brent Mishler (1993-2023)
- Lúcia Lohmann (2023-2024)
- J. Keith Gilless (2024-

== Jepson Herbarium ==
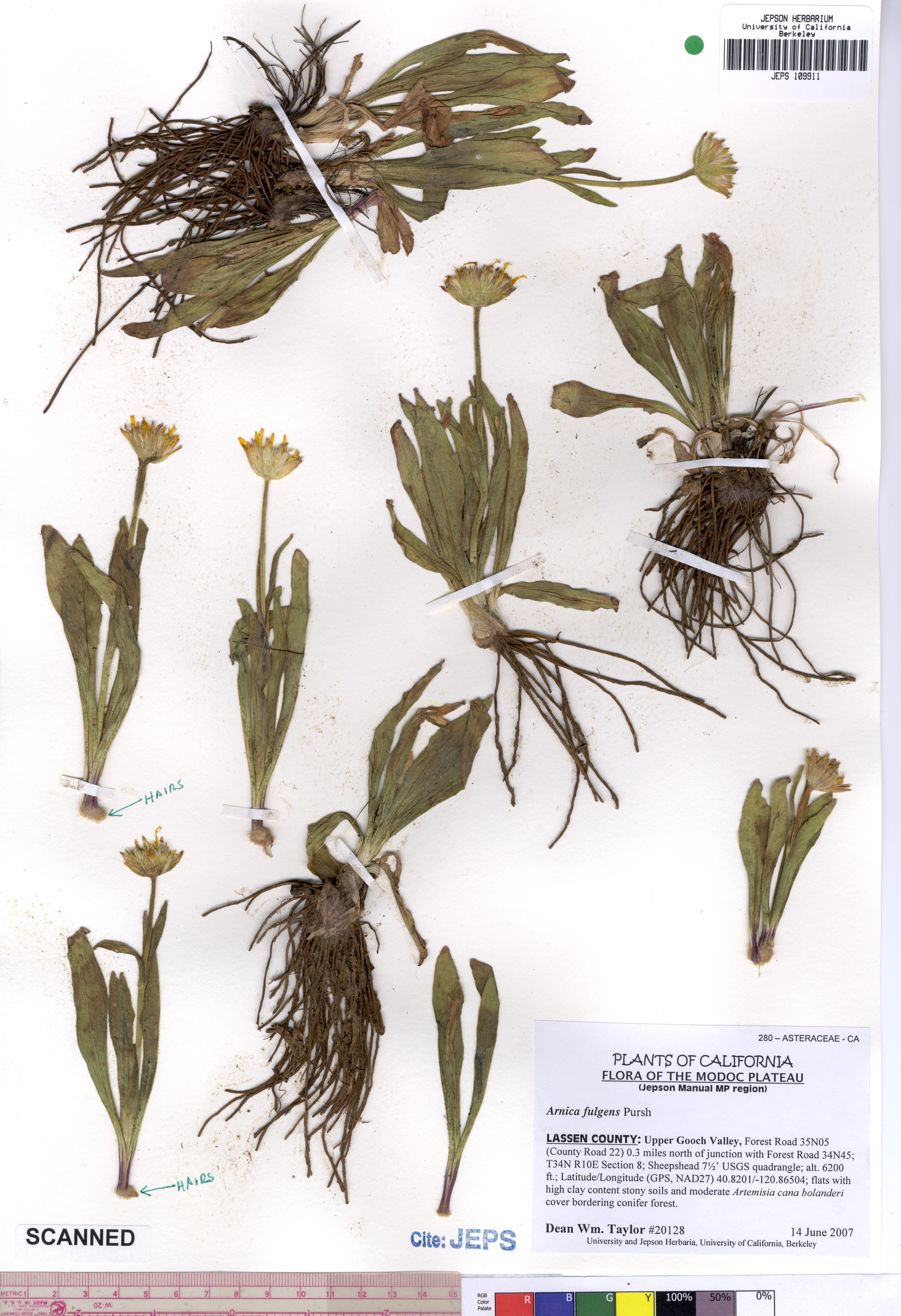
Jepson Herbarium specimen of Arnica fulgens, a vascular plant from California

The focus of the Jepson Herbarium is California vascular plants, including the native flora of California. It was established to "understand and conserve the California flora." In addition to the herbarium specimens research staff work on botanical projects that include updating The Jepson Manual, as well as related online resources for identifying California flora. A series of workshops on botanical and ecological subjects are designed and run to accommodate botanical enthusiasts from beginners to professionals. It was founded by Willis Linn Jepson in 1950, and named after him.

The Jepson Herbarium supports the Jepson eFlora, a taxonomic database that builds on and expands the second edition of The Jepson Manual. It describes itself as "the foremost authority on the native and naturalized vascular plants of California".

== See also ==
- Willis Jepson
- The Jepson Manual
