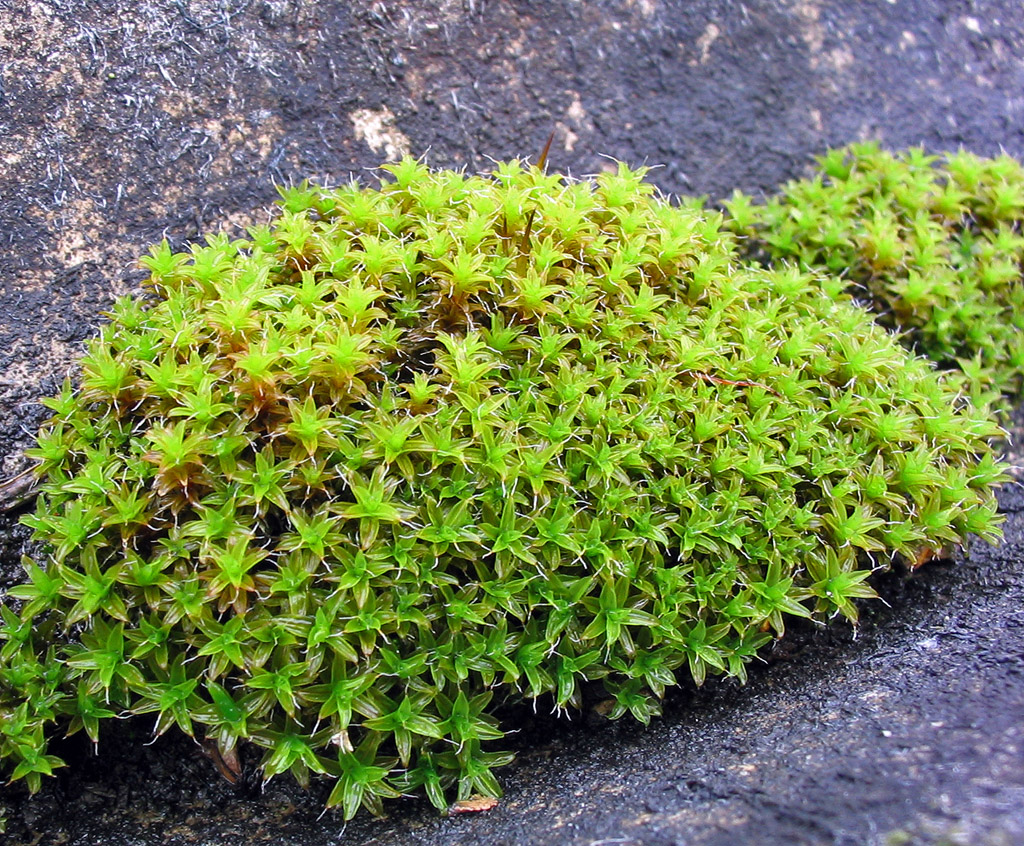
- Syntrichia ruralis

Scientific classification
- Kingdom: Plantae
- Division: Bryophyta
- Class: Bryopsida
- Subclass: Dicranidae
- Order: Pottiales
- Family: Pottiaceae
- Genus: Syntrichia; Brid.

= Syntrichia =

Genus of mosses

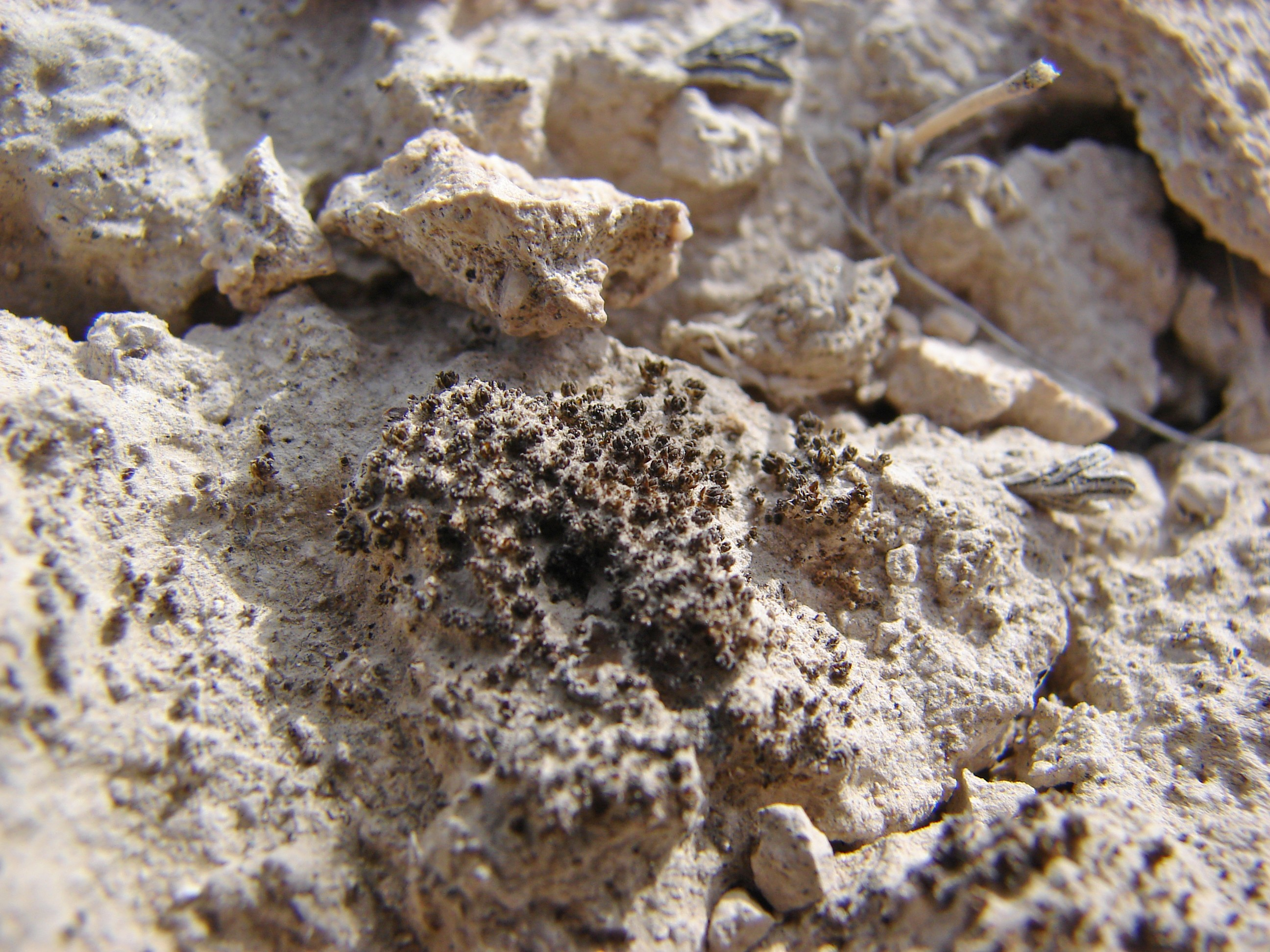
Syntrichia caninervis, the dominant moss in the blackbrush community of the Mojave Desert

Syntrichia is a large, cosmopolitan genus of mosses in the family Pottiaceae. The genus name is of Greek origin for "with" and "hair", referring to the "twisted peristome united by a basal membrane".

As of 2020, the World Flora Online accepts 114 species in the genus Syntrichia:

- Syntrichia abranchesii (Luisier) Ochyra
- Syntrichia aciphylla (Bruch & Schimp.) Jur.
- Syntrichia aculeata (Wilson) R.H. Zander
- Syntrichia agraria (Hedw.) F. Weber & D. Mohr
- Syntrichia alpestris (Dixon) R.H. Zander
- Syntrichia alpina Brid.
- Syntrichia ammonsiana (H.A. Crum & L.E. Anderson) Ochyra
- Syntrichia amphidiacea (Müll. Hal.) R.H. Zander
- Syntrichia anderssonii (Ångström) R.H. Zander
- Syntrichia andicola (Mont.) Ochyra
- Syntrichia angustifolia (Herzog) Cano
- Syntrichia antarctica (Hampe) R.H. Zander
- Syntrichia astoma (Schiffner) Podp.
- Syntrichia austro-africana (W.A. Kramer) R.H. Zander
- Syntrichia baileyi (Broth.) R.H. Zander
- Syntrichia bartramii (Steere) R.H. Zander
- Syntrichia berthoana (Thér.) M. T. Gallego & M.J. Cano
- Syntrichia bidentata (X.L. Bai) Ochyra
- Syntrichia bipedicellata (E. Britton) R.H. Zander
- Syntrichia bogotensis (Hampe) Mitt. ex R.H. Zander
- Syntrichia boliviana M. T. Gallego & M.J. Cano
- Syntrichia brachyclada (Cardot) R.H. Zander
- Syntrichia brandisii (Müll. Hal.) R.H. Zander
- Syntrichia breviseta (Mont.) Cano & M. T. Gallego
- Syntrichia brevisetacea (Hampe ex F. Muell.) R.H. Zander
- Syntrichia buchtienii (Herzog) Cano & M. T. Gallego
- Syntrichia cainii (H.A. Crum & L.E. Anderson) R.H. Zander
- Syntrichia calcicola J.J. Amann
- Syntrichia campestris (Dusén) R.H. Zander
- Syntrichia canescens (Mont.) Delogne
- Syntrichia caninervis Mitt.
- Syntrichia cavallii (G. Negri) Ochyra
- Syntrichia ciliata (Broth.) R.H. Zander
- Syntrichia conferta (E.B. Bartram) R.H. Zander
- Syntrichia costesii (Thér.) R.H. Zander
- Syntrichia crenulata (Warnst.) J.J. Amann
- Syntrichia cuneifolia (Dicks.) Delogne
- Syntrichia densa (Velen.) J.-P. Frahm
- Syntrichia desertorum (Broth.) J.J. Amann
- Syntrichia didymodontoides (Broth.) R.H. Zander
- Syntrichia epilosa (Broth. ex Dusén) R.H. Zander
- Syntrichia ericetorum (Dicks. ex With.) Brid.
- Syntrichia filaris (Müll. Hal.) R.H. Zander
- Syntrichia flagellaris (Schimp.) R.H. Zander
- Syntrichia fontana (Müll. Hal.) R.H. Zander
- Syntrichia fragilis (Taylor) Ochyra
- Syntrichia fuscoviridis (Cardot) R.H. Zander
- Syntrichia geheebiaeopsis (Müll. Hal.) R.H. Zander
- Syntrichia gemmascens (P.C. Chen) R.H. Zander
- Syntrichia glabra J.-P. Frahm & M. T. Gallego
- Syntrichia glacialis (Kunze ex Müll. Hal.) R.H. Zander
- Syntrichia gromschii (Thér.) R.H. Zander
- Syntrichia handelii (Schiffner) S. Agnew & Vondr.
- Syntrichia jaffuelii (Thér.) R.H. Zander
- Syntrichia lacerifolia (R.S. Williams) R.H. Zander
- Syntrichia laevipila Brid.
- Syntrichia latifolia (Bruch ex Hartm.) Huebener
- Syntrichia leucostega (Müll. Hal.) R.H. Zander
- Syntrichia leucostoma (R. Br.) Spreng.
- Syntrichia limensis (R.S. Williams) R.H. Zander
- Syntrichia linguifolia (Herzog) R.H. Zander
- Syntrichia lithophila (Dusén) Ochyra & R.H. Zander
- Syntrichia longimucronata (X.J. Li) R.H. Zander
- Syntrichia magellanica (Mont.) R.H. Zander
- Syntrichia magilliana L.E. Anderson
- Syntrichia minor (Bizot) M. T. Gallego, J. Guerra, M.J. Cano, Ros
- Syntrichia mollis (Bruch & Schimp. ex Müll. Hal.) R.H. Zander
- Syntrichia montana Nees
- Syntrichia muricata M. T. Gallego & Cano
- Syntrichia napoana (De Not.) Cano & M. T. Gallego
- Syntrichia norvegica F. Weber
- Syntrichia obtusissima (Müll. Hal.) R.H. Zander
- Syntrichia pagorum (Milde) J.J. Amann
- Syntrichia papillosa (Wilson) Jur.
- Syntrichia papillosissima (Copp.) Loeske
- Syntrichia percarnosa (Müll. Hal.) R.H. Zander
- Syntrichia phaea (Hook. f. & Wilson) R.H. Zander
- Syntrichia pichinchensis (Taylor) R.H. Zander
- Syntrichia polylepidis (Herzog) Cano & M. T. Gallego
- Syntrichia princeps (De Not.) Mitt.
- Syntrichia prostrata (Mont.) R.H. Zander
- Syntrichia pseudohandelii (J. Froehl.) S. Agnew & Vondr.
- Syntrichia pseudolatifolia (Cardot) M.J. Cano & M. T. Gallego
- Syntrichia pseudorobusta (Dusén) R.H. Zander
- Syntrichia pygmaea (Dusén) R.H. Zander
- Syntrichia ramosissima (Thér.) R.H. Zander
- Syntrichia reflexa R.H. Zander
- Syntrichia rigescens (Broth. & Geh.) Ochyra
- Syntrichia robusta (Hook. & Grev.) R.H. Zander
- Syntrichia rubella (Hook. & Wilson) R.H. Zander
- Syntrichia rubra (Mitt.) R.H. Zander
- Syntrichia rufa (Schimp. ex Besch.) O'Shea
- Syntrichia rupicola B.H. Allen
- Syntrichia ruralis (Hedw.) F. Weber & D. Mohr
- Syntrichia sarconeurum (Hook. f. & Wilson) Ochyra & R.H. Zander
- Syntrichia saxicola (Cardot) R.H. Zander
- Syntrichia scabrella (Dusén) R.H. Zander
- Syntrichia scabrinervis (Müll. Hal.) R.H. Zander
- Syntrichia schmidii (Müll. Hal.) Mitt.
- Syntrichia schnyderi (Müll. Hal.) R.H. Zander
- Syntrichia serrata (Dixon) R.H. Zander
- Syntrichia serripungens (Lorentz & Müll. Hal.) R.H. Zander
- Syntrichia serrulata (Hook. & Grev.) Cano
- Syntrichia sinensis (Müll. Hal.) Ochyra
- Syntrichia socialis (Dusén) R.H. Zander
- Syntrichia spuria J.J. Amann
- Syntrichia subaristata (Bruch & Schimp. ex Müll. Hal.) R.H. Zander
- Syntrichia submontana (Broth.) Ochyra
- Syntrichia subpapillosa (Cardot & Broth.) Matteri
- Syntrichia subpapillosissima (R.B. Pierrot ex W.A. Kramer) M. T. Gallego &
- Syntrichia sucrosa K. M. Kellman
- Syntrichia virescens (De Not.) Ochyra
- Syntrichia viridula (Müll. Hal.) R.H. Zander
- Syntrichia xerophila (Herzog) S.P. Churchill
