= The Jepson Manual =

Botany book edited by James Hickman

- Editor: James Hickman
- Subject: Botany
- Publisher: University of California Press
- Publication date: 1993
- ISBN: 9780520082557

The Jepson Manual is a flora of the vascular plants that are either native to or naturalized in California. Botanists often refer to the book simply as Jepson. It is produced by the University and Jepson Herbaria, of the University of California, Berkeley. Its second edition is the basis of the online Jepson eFlora.

== History ==
- 1923: Willis Linn Jepson – Manual of the Flowering Plants of California
- 1958, 1968: Philip Alexander Munz – A California Flora and Supplement
- 1993: James Craig Hickman (editor) – The Jepson Manual, Higher Plants of California (TJM93)
- 2012: Bruce Gregg Baldwin – The Jepson Manual: Vascular Plants of California, 2nd edition (TJM2)
- 2010−ongoing: The Jepson Online Interchange for California Floristics − Jepson eFlora (TJM2) – online.

=== Preceding works ===
The Jepson Manual also follows Philip A. Munz and David D. Keck in their A California Flora and Supplement of 1958 and 1968.

Like other florae, The Jepson Manual builds upon these prior publications. Except for the number of line drawings, it has more in common with Munz's 1968 book than with Jepson's 1923 book.

=== Editions ===
The first edition of The Jepson Manual was published in 1993 as The Jepson Manual: Higher Plants of California (TJM93), and was edited by James C. Hickman.

The second edition was published in 2012, as The Jepson Manual: Vascular Plants of California, Thoroughly Revised and Expanded (TJM2), and was edited by Bruce Gregg Baldwin, Douglas H. Goldman, David John Keil, Robert Patterson, and Thomas James Rosatti. The second edition features 7,601 California plant species, subspecies and varieties.

While the book is named in honor of Jepson, The Jepson Manual is not simply a new edition of Jepson's 1923 book, but a new work which Baldwin calls "the most time-consuming undertaking of my career."

== Jepson eFlora ==
The Jepson eFlora is a taxonomic database that builds on and expands the second edition of The Jepson Manual. It describes itself as "the foremost authority on the native and naturalized vascular plants of California".

== See also ==
- Flora of California-related topics
- List of California native plants
- University and Jepson Herbaria
