= Cisthene triplaga =

Scientific classification
- Kingdom: Animalia
- Phylum: Arthropoda
- Class: Insecta
- Order: Lepidoptera
- Superfamily: Noctuoidea
- Family: Erebidae
- Subfamily: Arctiinae
- Genus: Cisthene
- Species: C. triplaga

Binomial name
- Cisthene triplaga (Hampson, 1905)

Synonyms
- Illice triplaga Hampson, 1905

Species of moth

Cisthene triplaga is a moth of the family Erebidae from Paraguay. It was described by George Hampson in 1905. Hampson originally placed this species in the genus Illice. Hampson named another species in the same publication, from the same locality, as Cisthene triplaga, and this second species is presently placed in the genus Brycea, as Brycea triplaga.
