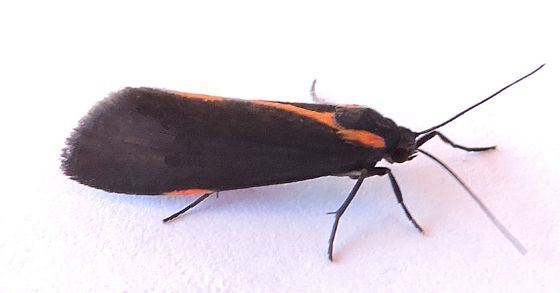

Scientific classification
- Domain: Eukaryota
- Kingdom: Animalia
- Phylum: Arthropoda
- Class: Insecta
- Order: Lepidoptera
- Superfamily: Noctuoidea
- Family: Erebidae
- Subfamily: Arctiinae
- Genus: Cisthene
- Species: C. juanita

Binomial name
- Cisthene juanita Barnes & Benjamin, 1925

= Cisthene juanita =

Species of moth

Cisthene juanita is a moth of the family Erebidae. It was described by William Barnes and Foster Hendrickson Benjamin in 1925 and is found in the United States in southern Arizona.
