= Cisthene orbonella =

Scientific classification
- Kingdom: Animalia
- Phylum: Arthropoda
- Class: Insecta
- Order: Lepidoptera
- Superfamily: Noctuoidea
- Family: Erebidae
- Subfamily: Arctiinae
- Genus: Cisthene
- Species: C. orbonella

Binomial name
- Cisthene orbonella (Hampson, 1900)

Synonyms
- Illice orbonella Hampson, 1900

Species of moth

Cisthene orbonella is a moth of the family Erebidae. It was described by George Hampson in 1900. It is found in the Brazilian states of Paraná and Rio de Janeiro.
