= Cisthene ruficollis =

Scientific classification
- Domain: Eukaryota
- Kingdom: Animalia
- Phylum: Arthropoda
- Class: Insecta
- Order: Lepidoptera
- Superfamily: Noctuoidea
- Family: Erebidae
- Subfamily: Arctiinae
- Genus: Cisthene
- Species: C. ruficollis

Binomial name
- Cisthene ruficollis (Schaus, 1896)

Synonyms
- Talara ruficollis Schaus, 1896

Species of moth

Cisthene ruficollis is a moth of the family Erebidae. It was described by William Schaus in 1896. It is found in the Brazilian states of São Paulo and Paraná.
