= Cisthene ditrigona =

Scientific classification
- Domain: Eukaryota
- Kingdom: Animalia
- Phylum: Arthropoda
- Class: Insecta
- Order: Lepidoptera
- Superfamily: Noctuoidea
- Family: Erebidae
- Subfamily: Arctiinae
- Genus: Cisthene
- Species: C. ditrigona

Binomial name
- Cisthene ditrigona (Schaus, 1899)

Synonyms
- Maepha ditrigona Schaus, 1899

Species of moth

Cisthene ditrigona is a moth of the family Erebidae. It was described by William Schaus in 1899. It is found in Brazil.
