= Cisthene metoxia =

Scientific classification
- Kingdom: Animalia
- Phylum: Arthropoda
- Class: Insecta
- Order: Lepidoptera
- Superfamily: Noctuoidea
- Family: Erebidae
- Subfamily: Arctiinae
- Genus: Cisthene
- Species: C. metoxia

Binomial name
- Cisthene metoxia Hampson, 1898

Species of moth

Cisthene metoxia is a moth of the family Erebidae. It was described by George Hampson in 1898. It is found on St. Vincent and Grenada.
