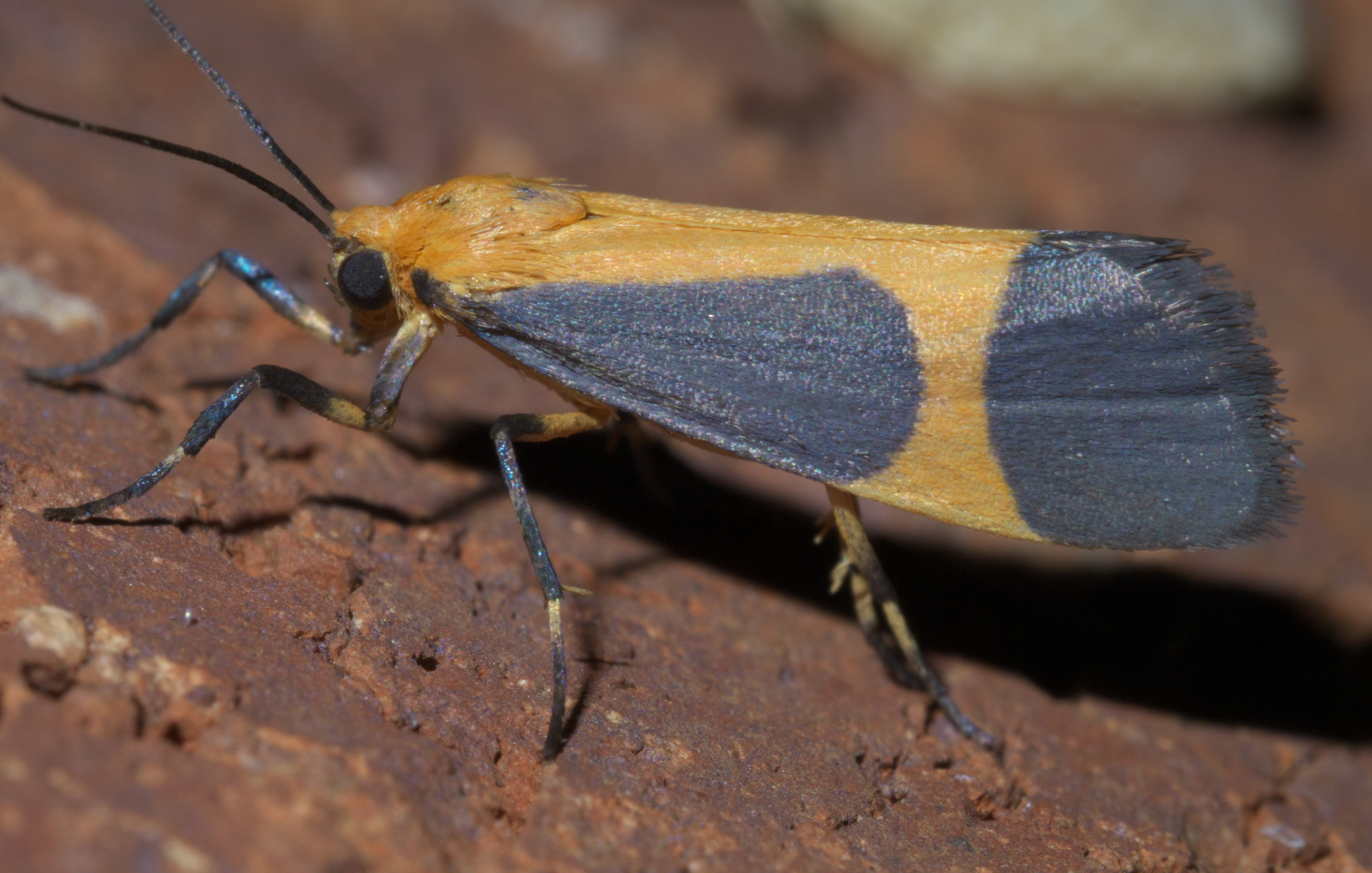

Scientific classification
- Domain: Eukaryota
- Kingdom: Animalia
- Phylum: Arthropoda
- Class: Insecta
- Order: Lepidoptera
- Superfamily: Noctuoidea
- Family: Erebidae
- Subfamily: Arctiinae
- Genus: Cisthene
- Species: C. picta

Binomial name
- Cisthene picta (Barnes & McDunnough, 1918)

Synonyms
- Illice picta Barnes & McDunnough, 1918; Illice texensis Draudt, 1918

= Cisthene picta =

Species of moth

Cisthene picta, the pictured lichen moth, is a moth of the family Erebidae. It was described by William Barnes and James Halliday McDunnough in 1918. It is found in the United States from Texas to Arizona. The habitat consists of deserts.

The wingspan is about 18 mm. Adults are on wing from August to October.
