= Cisthene hilaris =

Scientific classification
- Domain: Eukaryota
- Kingdom: Animalia
- Phylum: Arthropoda
- Class: Insecta
- Order: Lepidoptera
- Superfamily: Noctuoidea
- Family: Erebidae
- Subfamily: Arctiinae
- Genus: Cisthene
- Species: C. hilaris

Binomial name
- Cisthene hilaris Felder, 1875

Species of moth

Cisthene hilaris is a moth of the family Erebidae. It was described by Felder in 1875. It is found in Venezuela.
