= Cisthene opulentana =

Scientific classification
- Kingdom: Animalia
- Phylum: Arthropoda
- Class: Insecta
- Order: Lepidoptera
- Superfamily: Noctuoidea
- Family: Erebidae
- Subfamily: Arctiinae
- Genus: Cisthene
- Species: C. opulentana

Binomial name
- Cisthene opulentana (Walker, 1864)

Synonyms
- Maepha opulentana Walker, 1864

Species of moth

Cisthene opulentana is a moth of the family Erebidae. It was described by Francis Walker in 1864. It is found in the Brazilian localities of Tefé and Espírito Santo and in Bolivia.
