= Cisthene striata =

Striated lichen moth

Scientific classification
- Domain: Eukaryota
- Kingdom: Animalia
- Phylum: Arthropoda
- Class: Insecta
- Order: Lepidoptera
- Superfamily: Noctuoidea
- Family: Erebidae
- Subfamily: Arctiinae
- Genus: Cisthene
- Species: C. striata

Binomial name
- Cisthene striata Ottolengui, 1898

Synonyms
- Illice apicipicta Strand, 1922

Species of moth

Cisthene striata, the striated lichen moth, is a moth of the family Erebidae. It was described by Rodrigues Ottolengui in 1898. It is found in the US states of Maryland, Colorado, Georgia and Florida.

The wingspan is about 17 mm. Adults have been recorded on wing year round in Florida.
