= Cisthene liberomacula =

Scientific classification
- Kingdom: Animalia
- Phylum: Arthropoda
- Class: Insecta
- Order: Lepidoptera
- Superfamily: Noctuoidea
- Family: Erebidae
- Subfamily: Arctiinae
- Genus: Cisthene
- Species: C. liberomacula

Binomial name
- Cisthene liberomacula (Dyar, 1904)

Synonyms
- Illice liberomacula Dyar, 1904; Illice liberomacula f. basijuncta Barnes & McDunnough, 1918

Species of moth

Cisthene liberomacula is a moth of the family Erebidae. It was described by Harrison Gray Dyar Jr. in 1904. It is found along the coast of the US state of California. The habitat consists of areas with coastal live oaks.

The length of the forewings is 8–10 mm. Adults have been recorded on wing in April and from June to November.

The larvae feed on lichens growing on oaks.
