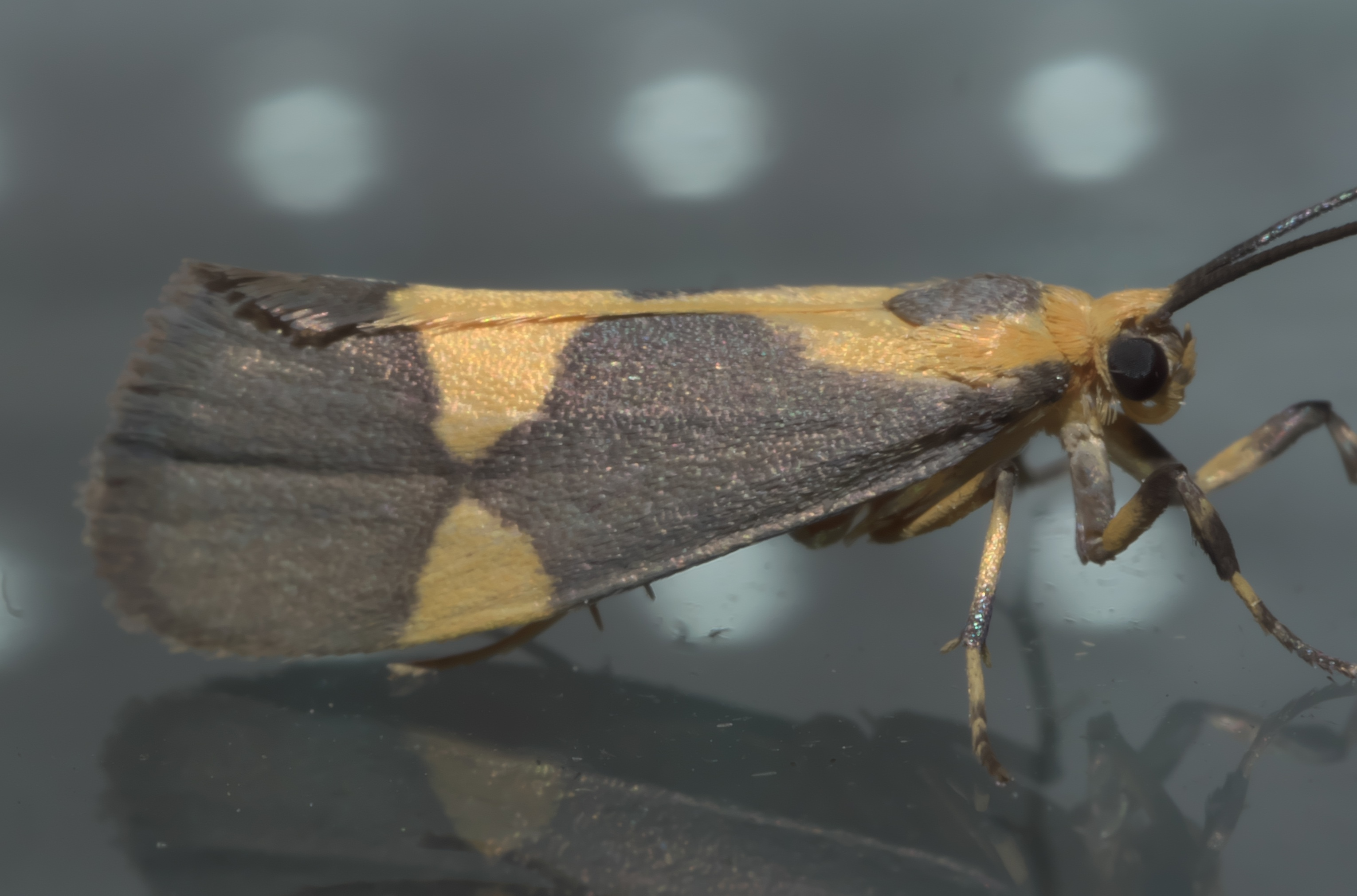

Scientific classification
- Domain: Eukaryota
- Kingdom: Animalia
- Phylum: Arthropoda
- Class: Insecta
- Order: Lepidoptera
- Superfamily: Noctuoidea
- Family: Erebidae
- Subfamily: Arctiinae
- Genus: Cisthene
- Species: C. unifascia

Binomial name
- Cisthene unifascia Grote & Robinson, 1868

Synonyms
- Illice unifascia f. ruptifascia Barnes & McDunnough, 1918; Illice mexicana Draudt, 1918

= Cisthene unifascia =

Species of moth

Cisthene unifascia is a moth of the family Erebidae. It was described by Augustus Radcliffe Grote and Coleman Townsend Robinson in 1868. It is found in the southern United States (Arkansas, California, Mississippi, Oklahoma, South Carolina and Texas) and Mexico. They are on wing from March to May and again from August to October.
