= Cisthene xanthospila =

Scientific classification
- Kingdom: Animalia
- Phylum: Arthropoda
- Class: Insecta
- Order: Lepidoptera
- Superfamily: Noctuoidea
- Family: Erebidae
- Subfamily: Arctiinae
- Genus: Cisthene
- Species: C. xanthospila

Binomial name
- Cisthene xanthospila (Hampson, 1900)

Synonyms
- Illice xanthospila Hampson, 1900

Species of moth

Cisthene xanthospila is a moth of the family Erebidae. It was described by George Hampson in 1900. It is found in Brazil.
