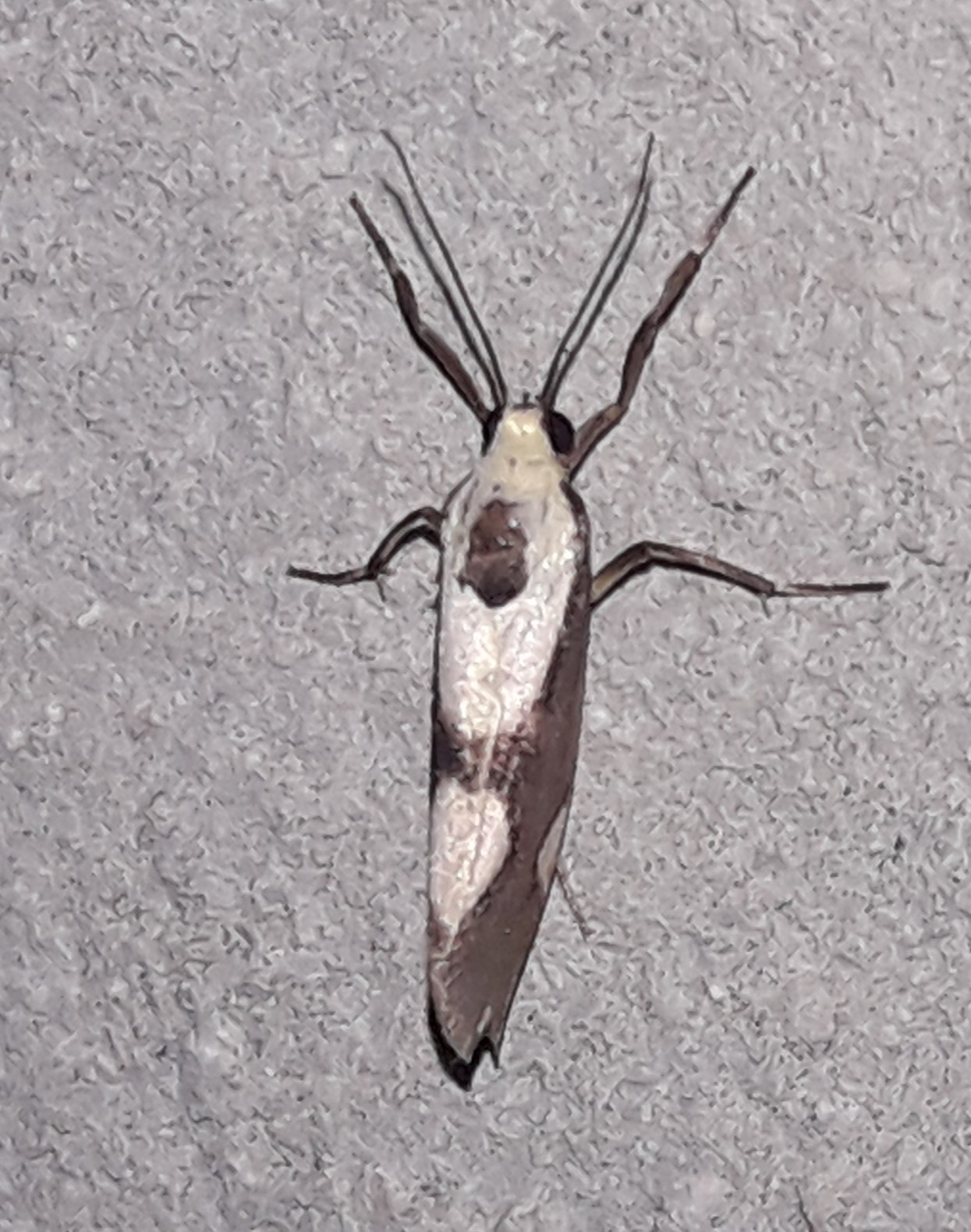

Scientific classification
- Domain: Eukaryota
- Kingdom: Animalia
- Phylum: Arthropoda
- Class: Insecta
- Order: Lepidoptera
- Superfamily: Noctuoidea
- Family: Erebidae
- Subfamily: Arctiinae
- Genus: Cisthene
- Species: C. polyzona

Binomial name
- Cisthene polyzona H. Druce, 1885

= Cisthene polyzona =

Species of moth

Cisthene polyzona is a species of moth in the family Erebidae. It was described by Herbert Druce in 1885. It is found in Mexico, Dominica and Rio de Janeiro, Brazil.
