= Cisthene dorsimacula =

Scientific classification
- Kingdom: Animalia
- Phylum: Arthropoda
- Class: Insecta
- Order: Lepidoptera
- Superfamily: Noctuoidea
- Family: Erebidae
- Subfamily: Arctiinae
- Genus: Cisthene
- Species: C. dorsimacula

Binomial name
- Cisthene dorsimacula (Dyar, 1904)

Synonyms
- Illice dorsimacula Dyar, 1904

Species of moth

Cisthene dorsimacula is a moth of the family Erebidae. It was described by Harrison Gray Dyar Jr. in 1904. It is found in southern California, United States.

The length of the forewings is about 9 mm. Adults have been recorded on wing from May to August and in October.
