= Cisthene petrovna =

Scientific classification
- Domain: Eukaryota
- Kingdom: Animalia
- Phylum: Arthropoda
- Class: Insecta
- Order: Lepidoptera
- Superfamily: Noctuoidea
- Family: Erebidae
- Subfamily: Arctiinae
- Genus: Cisthene
- Species: C. petrovna

Binomial name
- Cisthene petrovna Schaus, 1892

Species of moth

Cisthene petrovna is a moth of the family Erebidae. It was described by William Schaus in 1892. It is found in the Brazilian state of Rio de Janeiro.
