= Brycea disjuncta =

Scientific classification
- Kingdom: Animalia
- Phylum: Arthropoda
- Class: Insecta
- Order: Lepidoptera
- Superfamily: Noctuoidea
- Family: Erebidae
- Subfamily: Arctiinae
- Genus: Brycea
- Species: B. disjuncta

Binomial name
- Brycea disjuncta Walker, 1854

Synonyms
- Euchelita jenna Boisduval, 1870

Species of moth

Brycea disjuncta is a moth of the subfamily Arctiinae. It is found in Mexico, Guatemala and Brazil.
