= Cisthene conjuncta =

Scientific classification
- Domain: Eukaryota
- Kingdom: Animalia
- Phylum: Arthropoda
- Class: Insecta
- Order: Lepidoptera
- Superfamily: Noctuoidea
- Family: Erebidae
- Subfamily: Arctiinae
- Genus: Cisthene
- Species: C. conjuncta

Binomial name
- Cisthene conjuncta (Barnes & McDunnough, 1913)

Synonyms
- Illice conjuncta Barnes & McDunnough, 1913

Species of moth

Cisthene conjuncta, the white-streaked lichen moth, is a moth of the family Erebidae. It was described by William Barnes and James Halliday McDunnough in 1913. It is found in southern Texas.

The wingspan is about 15 mm. Adults are on wing in March, July and October.
