= Cisthene tyres =

Scientific classification
- Domain: Eukaryota
- Kingdom: Animalia
- Phylum: Arthropoda
- Class: Insecta
- Order: Lepidoptera
- Superfamily: Noctuoidea
- Family: Erebidae
- Subfamily: Arctiinae
- Genus: Cisthene
- Species: C. tyres

Binomial name
- Cisthene tyres (H. Druce, 1897)

Synonyms
- Lithosia tyres H. Druce, 1897

Species of moth

Cisthene tyres is a moth of the family Erebidae. It was described by Herbert Druce in 1897. It is found in Guatemala and Nicaragua.
