= Brycea itatiayae =

Scientific classification
- Domain: Eukaryota
- Kingdom: Animalia
- Phylum: Arthropoda
- Class: Insecta
- Order: Lepidoptera
- Superfamily: Noctuoidea
- Family: Erebidae
- Subfamily: Arctiinae
- Genus: Brycea
- Species: B. itatiayae

Binomial name
- Brycea itatiayae (Zerny, 1924)

Synonyms
- Cisthene itatiayae Zerny, 1924

Species of moth

Brycea itatiayae is a moth of the subfamily Arctiinae. It is found in Brazil.
