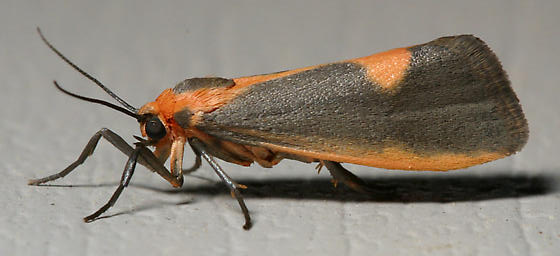

Scientific classification
- Domain: Eukaryota
- Kingdom: Animalia
- Phylum: Arthropoda
- Class: Insecta
- Order: Lepidoptera
- Superfamily: Noctuoidea
- Family: Erebidae
- Subfamily: Arctiinae
- Genus: Cisthene
- Species: C. plumbea

Binomial name
- Cisthene plumbea Stretch, 1885

Synonyms
- Cisthene injecta (Dyar, 1904); Cisthene gamma (Dyar, 1904); Cisthene flavicosta (Draudt, 1918)

= Cisthene plumbea =

Lead-colored lichen moth

Species of moth

Cisthene plumbea, the lead-colored lichen moth, is a moth of the family Erebidae. The species was first described by Richard Harper Stretch in 1885. It is found in eastern North America, from southern New Jersey south to northern Florida, west to Wisconsin and Texas.

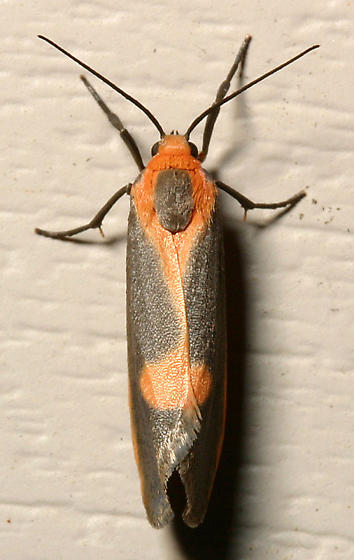

The wingspan is 17–21 mm. Adults are on wing from June to September. There are two generations per year in most of its range. In Louisiana, there are three annual generations.

The larvae feed on lichen.
