= Cisthene faustinula =

Scientific classification
- Domain: Eukaryota
- Kingdom: Animalia
- Phylum: Arthropoda
- Class: Insecta
- Order: Lepidoptera
- Superfamily: Noctuoidea
- Family: Erebidae
- Subfamily: Arctiinae
- Genus: Cisthene
- Species: C. faustinula

Binomial name
- Cisthene faustinula (Boisduval, 1869)

Synonyms
- Lithosia faustinula Boisduval, 1869; Cisthene fusca Stretch, 1872

Species of moth

Cisthene faustinula is a moth of the family Erebidae. It was described by Jean Baptiste Boisduval in 1869. It is found in California.

The length of the forewings 9–11 mm. Adults have been recorded on wing from July to September.
