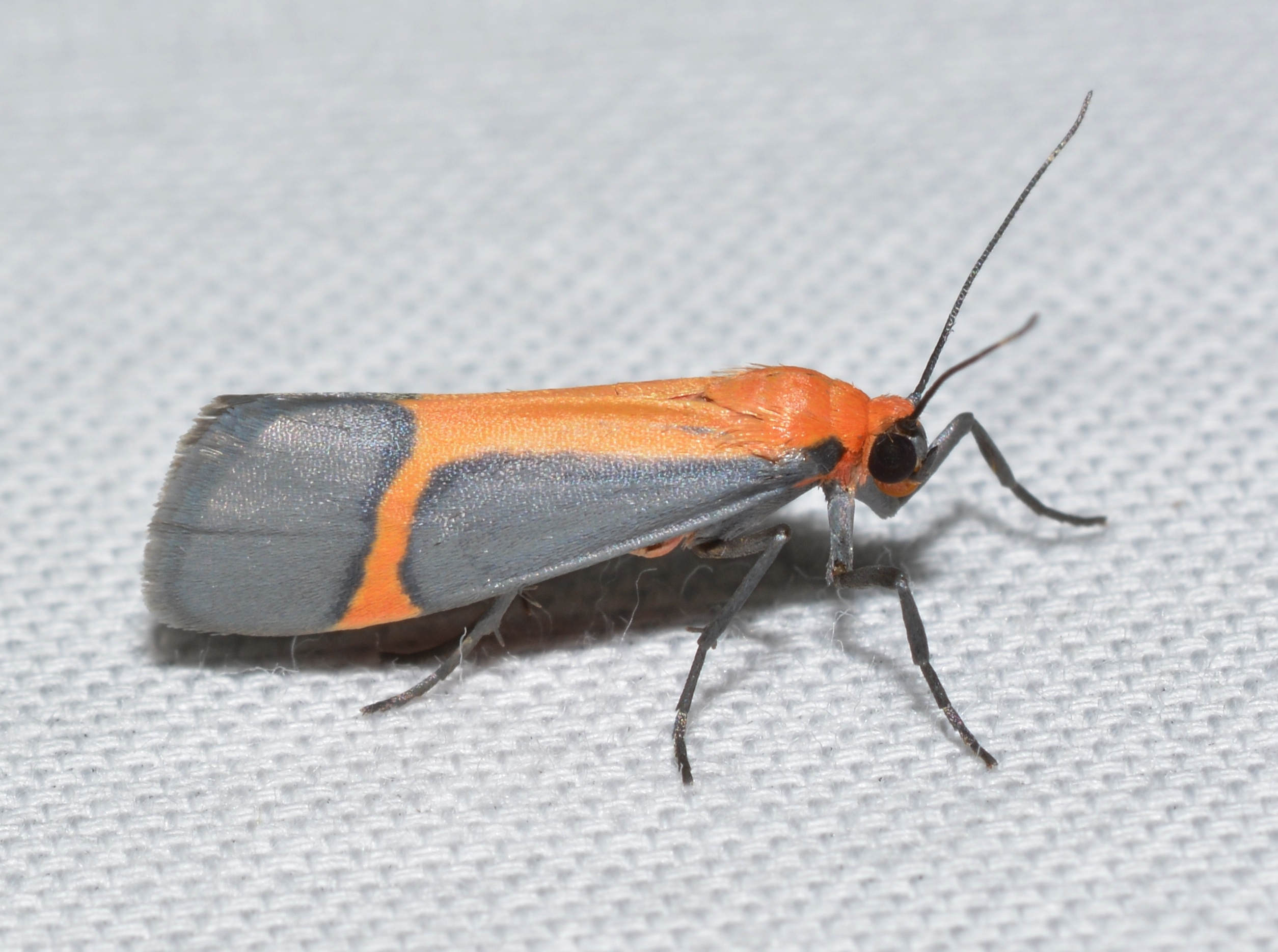

Scientific classification
- Kingdom: Animalia
- Phylum: Arthropoda
- Class: Insecta
- Order: Lepidoptera
- Superfamily: Noctuoidea
- Family: Erebidae
- Subfamily: Arctiinae
- Genus: Cisthene
- Species: C. angelus

Binomial name
- Cisthene angelus (Dyar, 1904)

Synonyms
- Illice angelus Dyar, 1904

= Cisthene angelus =

Angel lichen moth

Species of moth

Cisthene angelus, the angel lichen moth, is a moth of the family Erebidae. It was described by Harrison Gray Dyar Jr. in 1904. It is found in North America.
