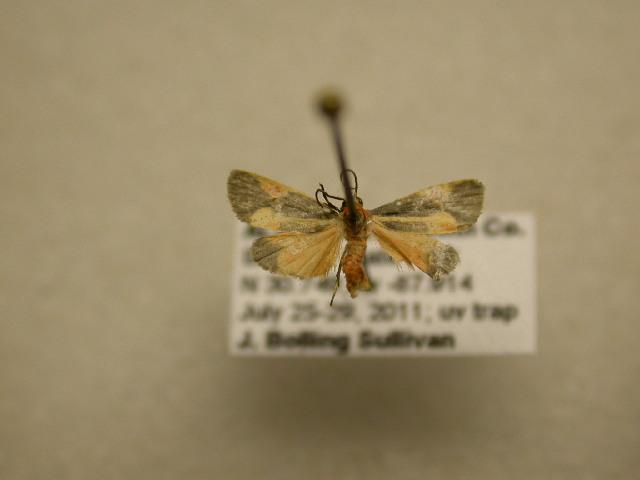

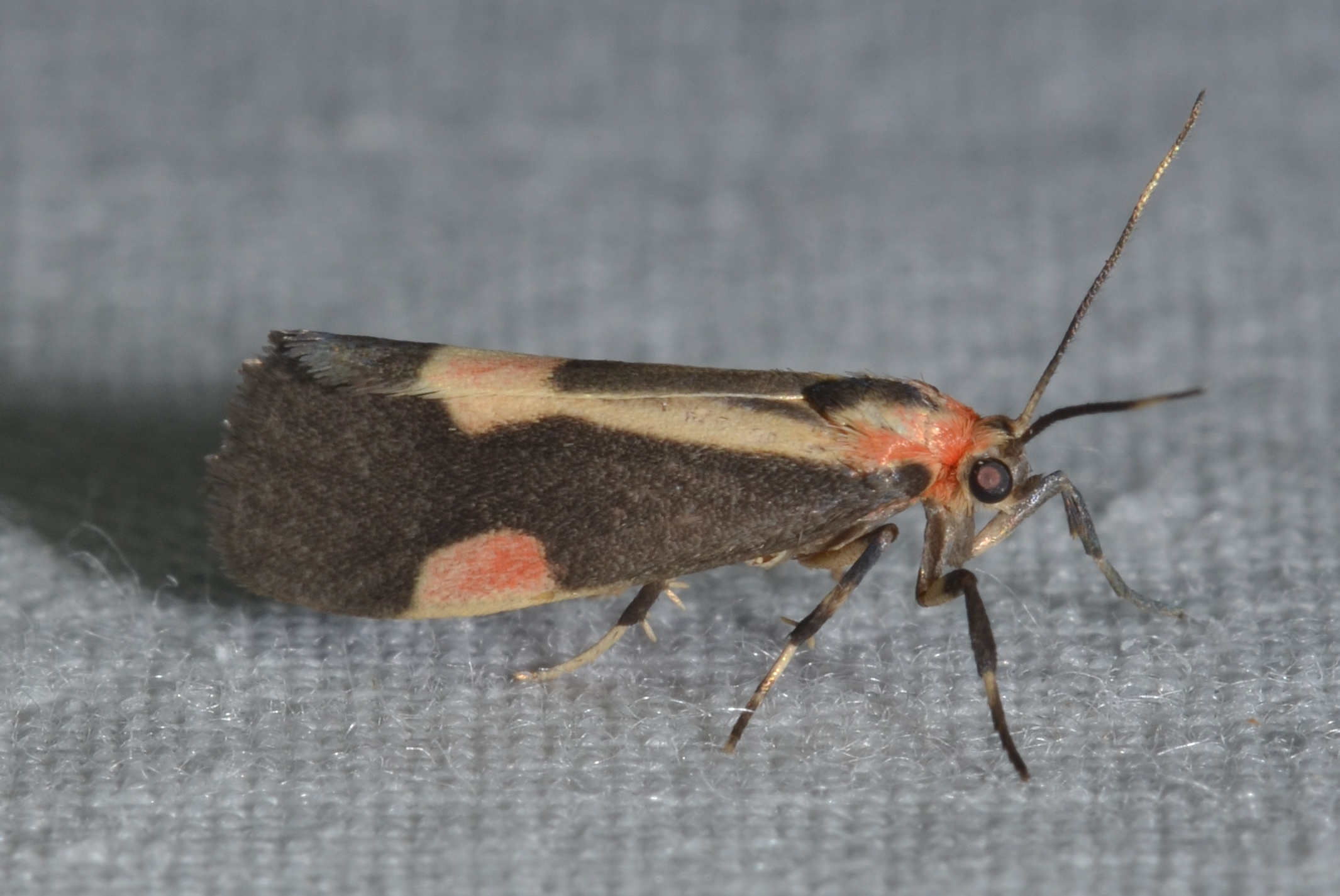

Scientific classification
- Domain: Eukaryota
- Kingdom: Animalia
- Phylum: Arthropoda
- Class: Insecta
- Order: Lepidoptera
- Superfamily: Noctuoidea
- Family: Erebidae
- Subfamily: Arctiinae
- Genus: Cisthene
- Species: C. packardii

Binomial name
- Cisthene packardii (Grote, 1863)

Synonyms
- Hypoprepia packardii Grote, 1863

= Cisthene packardii =

Packard's lichen moth

Species of moth

Cisthene packardii, or Packard's lichen moth, is a moth of the family Erebidae. It was described by Augustus Radcliffe Grote in 1863. It is found in the US from the states of New York to Florida and from Missouri to Texas.

The wingspan is about 19 mm. Adults are on wing from February to December in the south.

The larvae feed on algae and lichens. They are grey to charcoal with a mottled black head. Full-grown larvae reach a length of about 12 mm.
