= Cisthene batialis =

Scientific classification
- Kingdom: Animalia
- Phylum: Arthropoda
- Class: Insecta
- Order: Lepidoptera
- Superfamily: Noctuoidea
- Family: Erebidae
- Subfamily: Arctiinae
- Genus: Cisthene
- Species: C. batialis

Binomial name
- Cisthene batialis (Walker, 1859)

Synonyms
- Illice batialis Walker, 1859; Scoparia stupidalis Walker, 1862

Species of moth

Cisthene batialis is a moth of the family Erebidae. It was described by Francis Walker in 1859. It is found in the Brazilian states of Rio de Janeiro and São Paulo.
