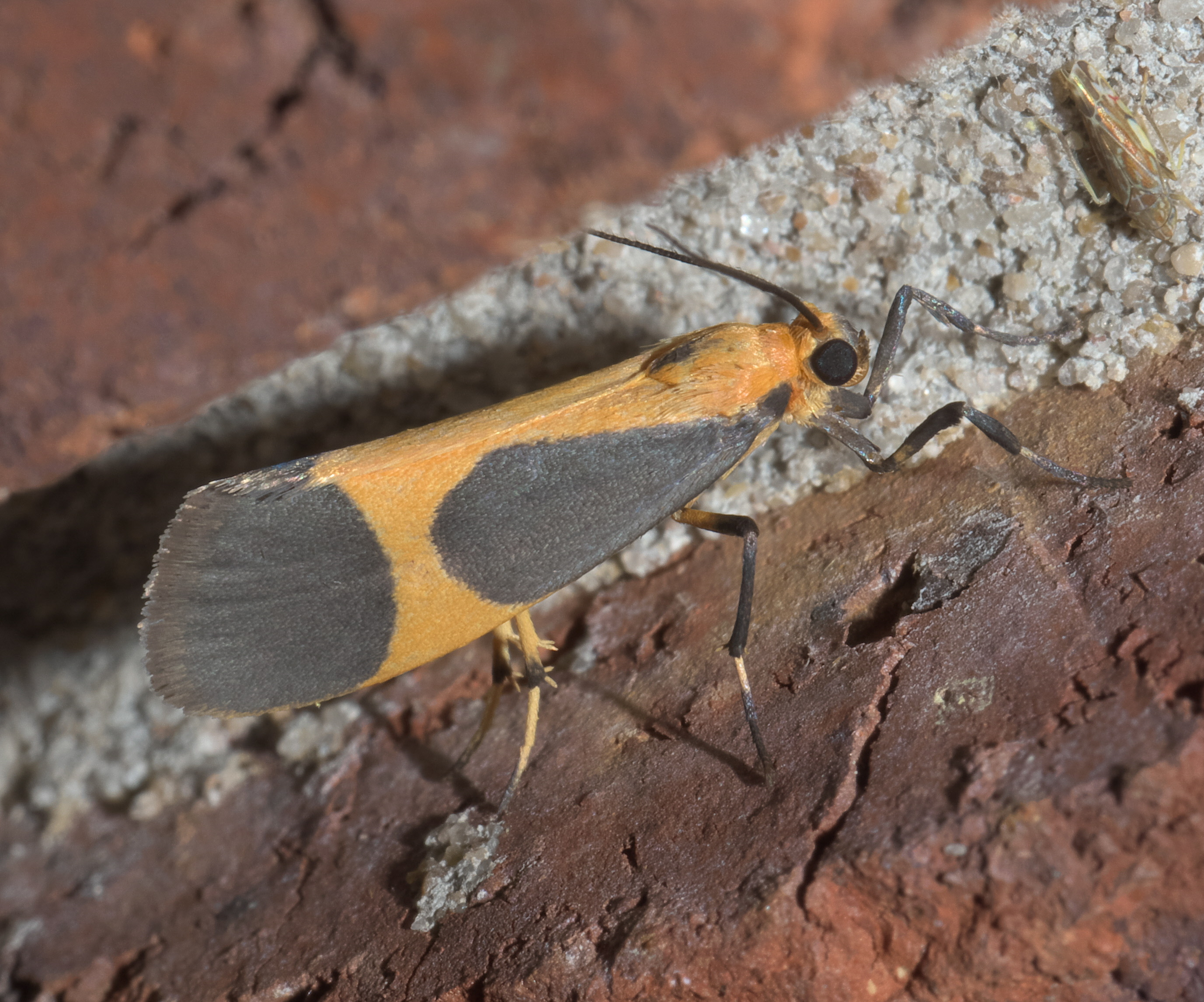
- Cisthene picta

Scientific classification
- Kingdom: Animalia
- Phylum: Arthropoda
- Class: Insecta
- Order: Lepidoptera
- Superfamily: Noctuoidea
- Family: Erebidae
- Subfamily: Arctiinae
- Subtribe: Cisthenina
- Genus: Cisthene; Walker, 1854

Synonyms
- Illice Walker, 1859; Maepha Walker, 1864; Pyralidia Felder, 1874; Byssophaga Stretch, 1872; Zonoda Schaus, 1896; Zanoda Schaus, 1896; Ozodania Dyar, 1899

= Cisthene =

Genus of moths

Cisthene is a genus of lichen moths in the family Erebidae. The genus was erected by Francis Walker in 1854.

== Species ==
The following species are recognised in the genus Cisthene:

- Cisthene abala (Schaus, 1905)
- Cisthene albizonea (Hampson, 1918)
- Cisthene angelus (Dyar, 1904) – angel lichen moth
- Cisthene barnesii (Dyar, 1904)
- Cisthene batialis (Walker, 1859)
- Cisthene biota (Dyar, 1910)
- Cisthene bisigna Berg, 1875
- Cisthene blanda (Jones, 1914)
- Cisthene bonitensis (Schaus, 1924)
- Cisthene calochroma (Snellen, 1878)
- Cisthene citrina Druce, 1885
- Cisthene conjuncta (Barnes & McDunnough, 1913)
- Cisthene croesus (Hampson, 1914)
- Cisthene cryptopyra (Hampson, 1903)
- Cisthene coronado C.B. Knowlton, 1967
- Cisthene deserta (Felder, 1868)
- Cisthene discistriga (Dognin, 1912)
- Cisthene ditrigona (Schaus, 1899)
- Cisthene dives (Schaus, 1896)
- Cisthene dorsimacula (Dyar, 1904)
- Cisthene endoxantha (Hampson, 1903)
- Cisthene fasciata (Schaus, 1896)
- Cisthene faustinula (Boisduval, 1869)
- Cisthene flagrans (Hampson, 1903)
- Cisthene flavizonata (Dognin, 1916)
- Cisthene fuscilingua Dyar, 1914)
- Cisthene griseola (Rothschild, 1913)
- Cisthene hilaris Felder, 1875
- Cisthene introbasalis (Rothschild, 1916)
- Cisthene juanita Barnes & Benjamin, 1925
- Cisthene kentuckiensis (Dyar, 1904) – Kentucky lichen moth
- Cisthene lactea Stretch, 1885
- Cisthene leuconotum (Dyar, 1914)
- Cisthene liberomacula (Dyar, 1904)
- Cisthene lincea (Schaus, 1921)
- Cisthene longistriga (Rothschild, 1913)
- Cisthene lycomorphodes (Draudt, 1918)
- Cisthene martini C.B. Knowlton, 1967
- Cisthene mediofasciata (Rothschild, 1913)
- Cisthene metoxia Hampson, 1898
- Cisthene minuta Butler, 1877
- Cisthene nigromaculata (Reich, 1933)
- Cisthene opulentana (Walker, 1864)
- Cisthene orbonella (Hampson, 1900)
- Cisthene pacata (Schaus, 1929)
- Cisthene packardii (Grote, 1863) – Packard's lichen moth
- Cisthene perrosea (Dyar, 1904)
- Cisthene persimilis (Hampson, 1903)
- Cisthene petrovna Schaus, 1892
- Cisthene phaeoceps (Hampson, 1900)
- Cisthene picta (Barnes & McDunnough, 1918)
- Cisthene plumbea Stretch, 1885 – lead-colored lichen moth
- Cisthene polyzona Druce, 1885
- Cisthene pygmaea (Schaus, 1905)
- Cisthene rhodocraspis (Hampson, 1905)
- Cisthene rosacea (Schaus, 1896)
- Cisthene roseiceps (Hampson, 1905)
- Cisthene rubricollis (Schaus, 1905)
- Cisthene ruficollis (Schaus, 1896)
- Cisthene sexalata (Draudt, 1918)
- Cisthene striata Ottolengui, 1898 – striated lichen moth
- Cisthene subjecta Walker, 1854 – subject lichen moth
- Cisthene subrubra (Schaus, 1905)
- Cisthene subrufa (Barnes & McDunnough, 1913)
- Cisthene tenuifascia Harvey, 1875 – thin-banded lichen moth
- Cisthene tessellata (Dognin, 1912)
- Cisthene trimaculata (Jones, 1914)
- Cisthene triplaga (Hampson, 1905)
- Cisthene triplagiata (Rothschild, 1913)
- Cisthene (aff. triplagiata) sp.
- Cisthene tyres (Druce, 1897)
- Cisthene unifascia Grote & Robinson, 1868
- Cisthene uniplaga (Reich, 1936)
- Cisthene vilaricensis (Schaus, 1938)
- Cisthene xanthospila (Hampson, 1900)
