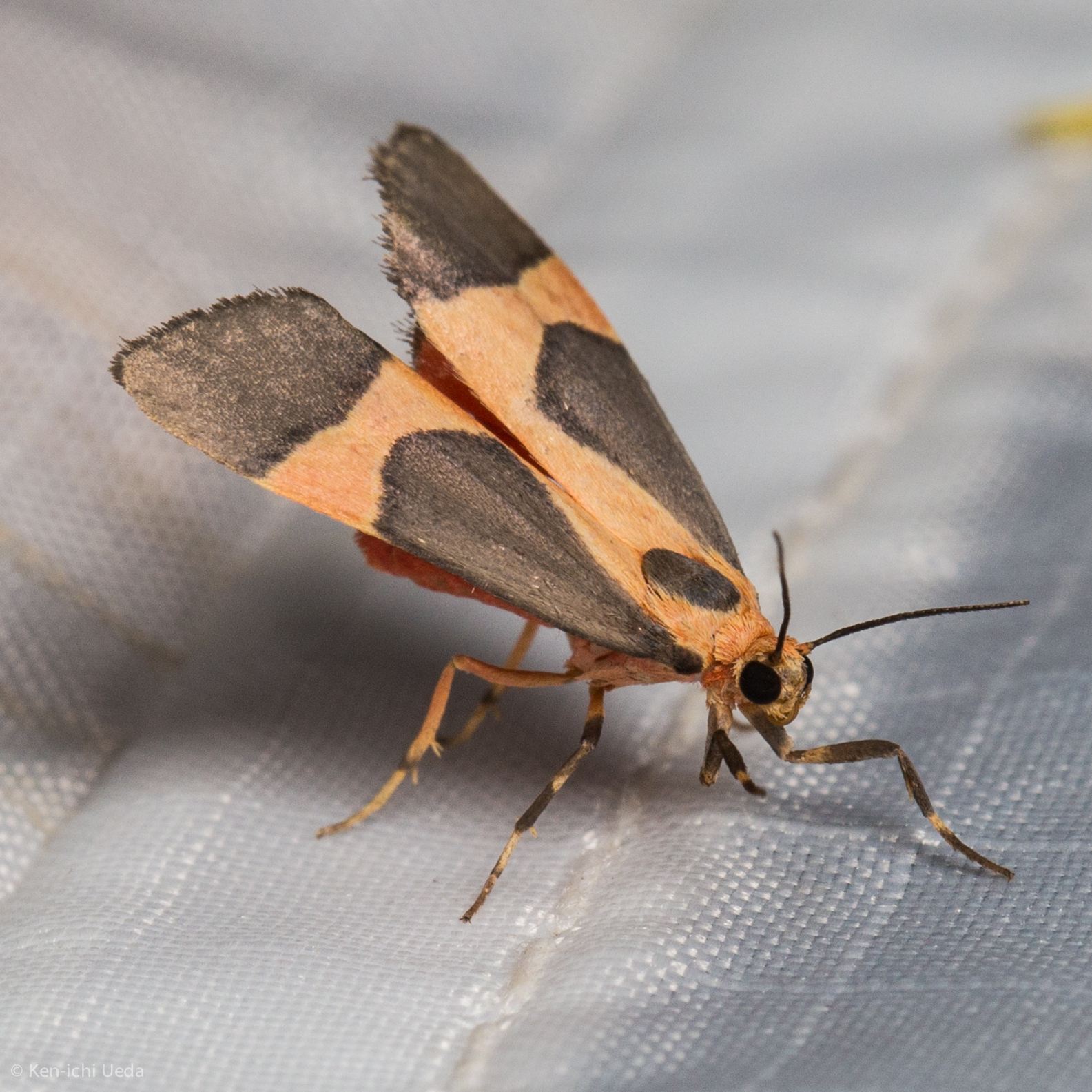

Scientific classification
- Domain: Eukaryota
- Kingdom: Animalia
- Phylum: Arthropoda
- Class: Insecta
- Order: Lepidoptera
- Superfamily: Noctuoidea
- Family: Erebidae
- Subfamily: Arctiinae
- Genus: Cisthene
- Species: C. martini

Binomial name
- Cisthene martini Knowlton, 1967

= Cisthene martini =

Species of moth

Cisthene martini, or Martin's lichen moth, is a moth of the family Erebidae first described by Carroll B. Knowlton in 1967. It is found in the US states of Arizona, New Mexico and Texas.

The length of the forewings is 9–11 mm.
