= Cisthene bisigna =

Scientific classification
- Domain: Eukaryota
- Kingdom: Animalia
- Phylum: Arthropoda
- Class: Insecta
- Order: Lepidoptera
- Superfamily: Noctuoidea
- Family: Erebidae
- Subfamily: Arctiinae
- Genus: Cisthene
- Species: C. bisigna

Binomial name
- Cisthene bisigna Berg, 1875

Species of moth

Cisthene bisigna is a moth of the family Erebidae. It was described by Carlos Berg in 1875 and is found in Patagonia.
