= Cisthene deserta =

Scientific classification
- Kingdom: Animalia
- Phylum: Arthropoda
- Class: Insecta
- Order: Lepidoptera
- Superfamily: Noctuoidea
- Family: Erebidae
- Subfamily: Arctiinae
- Genus: Cisthene
- Species: C. deserta

Binomial name
- Cisthene deserta (Felder, 1868)

Synonyms
- Pyralidia deserta Felder, 1874; Cisthene grisea Packard, 1872; Lithosia nexa Boisduval, 1869

Species of moth

Cisthene deserta is a moth belonging to the family Erebidae. It was described by Felder in 1868. It is found in North America, where it has been recorded from Utah and California.

The length of the forewings is 9–11 mm. Adults are on wing from April to July.
