= Cisthene perrosea =

Scientific classification
- Kingdom: Animalia
- Phylum: Arthropoda
- Class: Insecta
- Order: Lepidoptera
- Superfamily: Noctuoidea
- Family: Erebidae
- Subfamily: Arctiinae
- Genus: Cisthene
- Species: C. perrosea

Binomial name
- Cisthene perrosea (Dyar, 1904)

Synonyms
- Illice unifascia var. perrosea Dyar, 1904

Species of moth

Cisthene perrosea is a moth of the family Erebidae. It was described by Harrison Gray Dyar Jr. in 1904. It is found in the US from California to Utah, New Mexico and western Texas.

The length of the forewings is 9–11 mm. Adults are on wing from June to July and again from September to October.
