= Cisthene fuscilingua =

Scientific classification
- Kingdom: Animalia
- Phylum: Arthropoda
- Class: Insecta
- Order: Lepidoptera
- Superfamily: Noctuoidea
- Family: Erebidae
- Subfamily: Arctiinae
- Genus: Cisthene
- Species: C. fuscilingua

Binomial name
- Cisthene fuscilingua (Dyar, 1914)

Synonyms
- Paraprepia fuscilingua Dyar, 1914

Species of moth

Cisthene fuscilingua is a moth of the family Erebidae. It was described by Harrison Gray Dyar Jr. in 1914. It is found in Panama.
