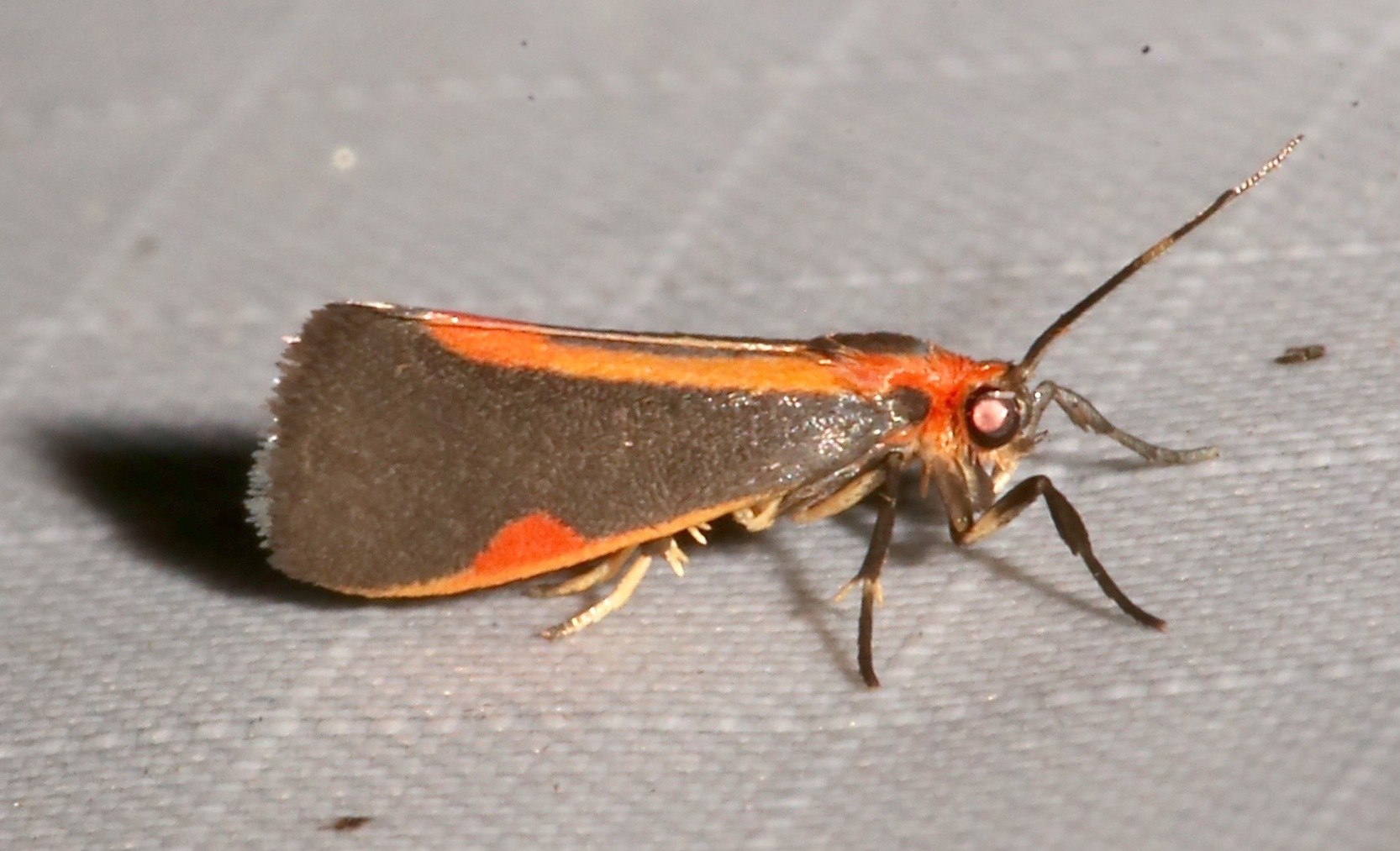

Scientific classification
- Kingdom: Animalia
- Phylum: Arthropoda
- Class: Insecta
- Order: Lepidoptera
- Superfamily: Noctuoidea
- Family: Erebidae
- Subfamily: Arctiinae
- Genus: Cisthene
- Species: C. subjecta

Binomial name
- Cisthene subjecta Walker, 1854

Synonyms
- Illice bellicula Dyar, 1921

= Cisthene subjecta =

Subject lichen moth

Species of moth

Cisthene subjecta, the subject lichen moth, is a moth of the family Erebidae. It was described by Francis Walker in 1854. It is found in the south-eastern United States, where it has been recorded from Alabama, Florida, Georgia, Indiana, Kentucky, Maryland, Mississippi, North Carolina, Oklahoma, South Carolina, Tennessee and Texas.

The wingspan is about 12 mm. Adults have been recorded on wing year round.
