= Cisthene calochroma =

Scientific classification
- Kingdom: Animalia
- Phylum: Arthropoda
- Class: Insecta
- Order: Lepidoptera
- Superfamily: Noctuoidea
- Family: Erebidae
- Subfamily: Arctiinae
- Genus: Cisthene
- Species: C. calochroma

Binomial name
- Cisthene calochroma (Snellen, 1878)

Synonyms
- Hipocrita calochroma Snellen, 1878

Species of moth

Cisthene calochroma is a moth of the family Erebidae. It was described by Snellen in 1878. It is found in Argentina.
