= Cisthene coronado =

Scientific classification
- Domain: Eukaryota
- Kingdom: Animalia
- Phylum: Arthropoda
- Class: Insecta
- Order: Lepidoptera
- Superfamily: Noctuoidea
- Family: Erebidae
- Subfamily: Arctiinae
- Genus: Cisthene
- Species: C. coronado

Binomial name
- Cisthene coronado Knowlton, 1967

Synonyms
- Eucyclopera coronado

Species of moth

Cisthene coronado is a moth of the family Erebidae first described by Carroll B. Knowlton in 1967. It is found in the US state of Arizona.
