= Cisthene leuconotum =

Scientific classification
- Domain: Eukaryota
- Kingdom: Animalia
- Phylum: Arthropoda
- Class: Insecta
- Order: Lepidoptera
- Superfamily: Noctuoidea
- Family: Erebidae
- Subfamily: Arctiinae
- Genus: Cisthene
- Species: C. leuconotum

Binomial name
- Cisthene leuconotum (Dyar, 1914)

Synonyms
- Illice leuconotum Dyar, 1914

Species of moth

Cisthene leuconotum is a moth of the family Erebidae. It was described by Harrison Gray Dyar Jr. in 1914. It is found in Panama.
