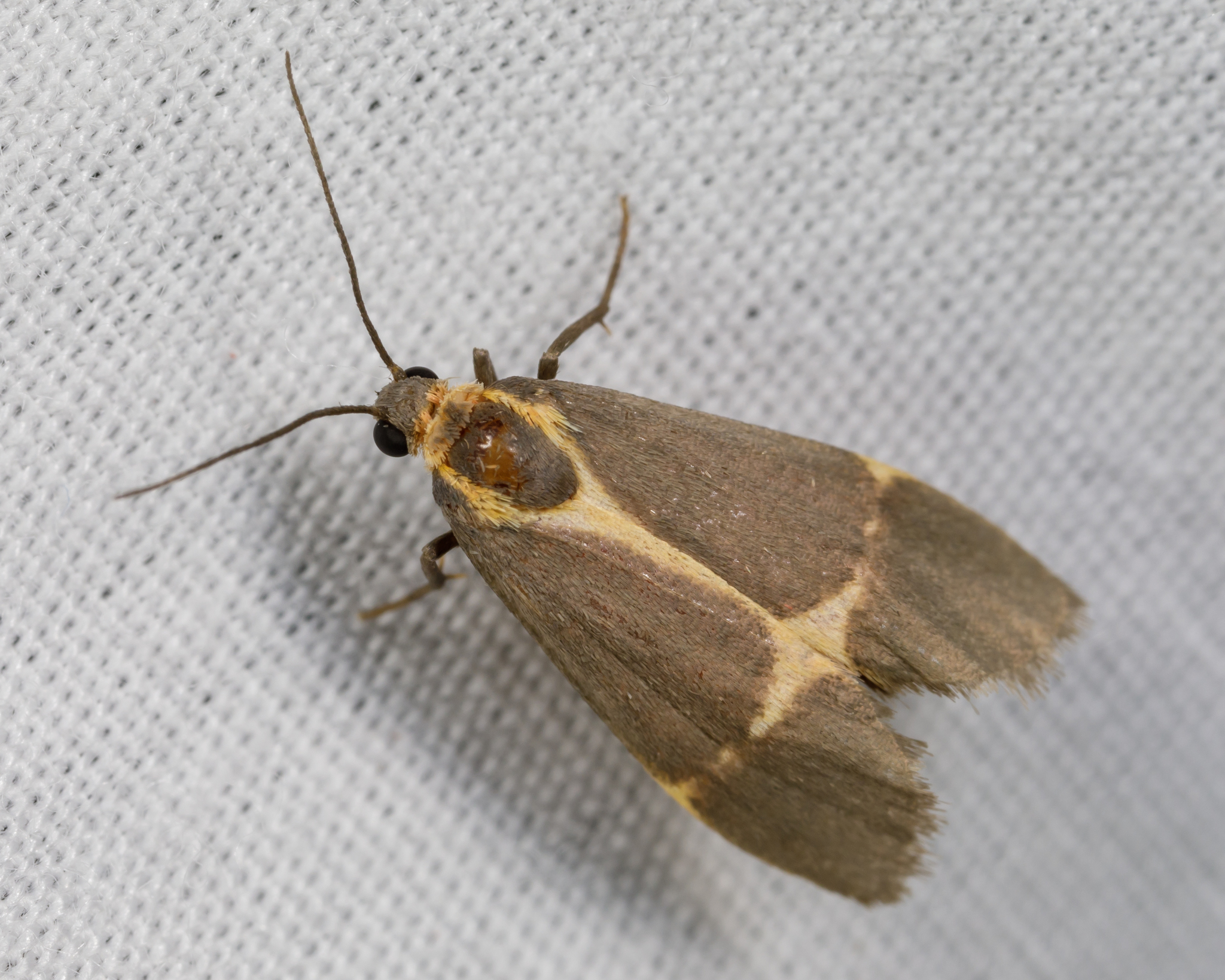

Scientific classification
- Kingdom: Animalia
- Phylum: Arthropoda
- Clade: Pancrustacea
- Class: Insecta
- Order: Lepidoptera
- Superfamily: Noctuoidea
- Family: Erebidae
- Subfamily: Arctiinae
- Genus: Cisthene
- Species: C. barnesii

Binomial name
- Cisthene barnesii (Dyar, 1904)

Synonyms
- Illice unifascia var. barnesi Dyar, 1904; Illice flavula Barnes & McDunnough, 1918; Illice costimacula Draudt, 1918; Illice flava Draudt, 1919

= Cisthene barnesii =

Species of moth

Cisthene barnesii, or Barnes' lichen moth, is a moth of the family Erebidae. It was described by Harrison Gray Dyar Jr. in 1904. It is found in the US Rocky Mountain region, from southern Montana and western North Dakota to the border with Mexico in Arizona and New Mexico. The habitat consists of dry bunchgrass steppe.

The length of the forewings is 11–12 mm. Adults have been recorded on wing from mid-July to late August.

== Etymology ==
The species is named after entomologist William Barnes.
