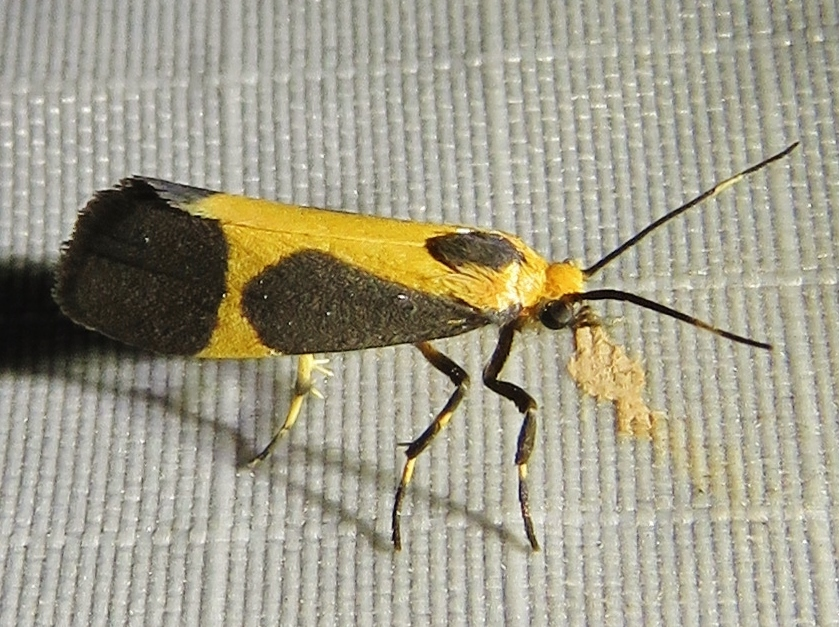
- Cisthene kentuckiensis, East Texas

Scientific classification
- Kingdom: Animalia
- Phylum: Arthropoda
- Class: Insecta
- Order: Lepidoptera
- Superfamily: Noctuoidea
- Family: Erebidae
- Subfamily: Arctiinae
- Genus: Cisthene
- Species: C. kentuckiensis

Binomial name
- Cisthene kentuckiensis (Dyar, 1904)

Synonyms
- Illice unifascia var. kentuckiensis Dyar, 1904

= Cisthene kentuckiensis =

Kentucky lichen moth

Species of moth

Cisthene kentuckiensis, the Kentucky lichen moth, is a moth of the family Erebidae. It was described by Harrison Gray Dyar Jr. in 1904. It is found in the United States from New Jersey south to northern Florida, and west to Missouri, Oklahoma, and Texas.

The larvae feed on lichens.
