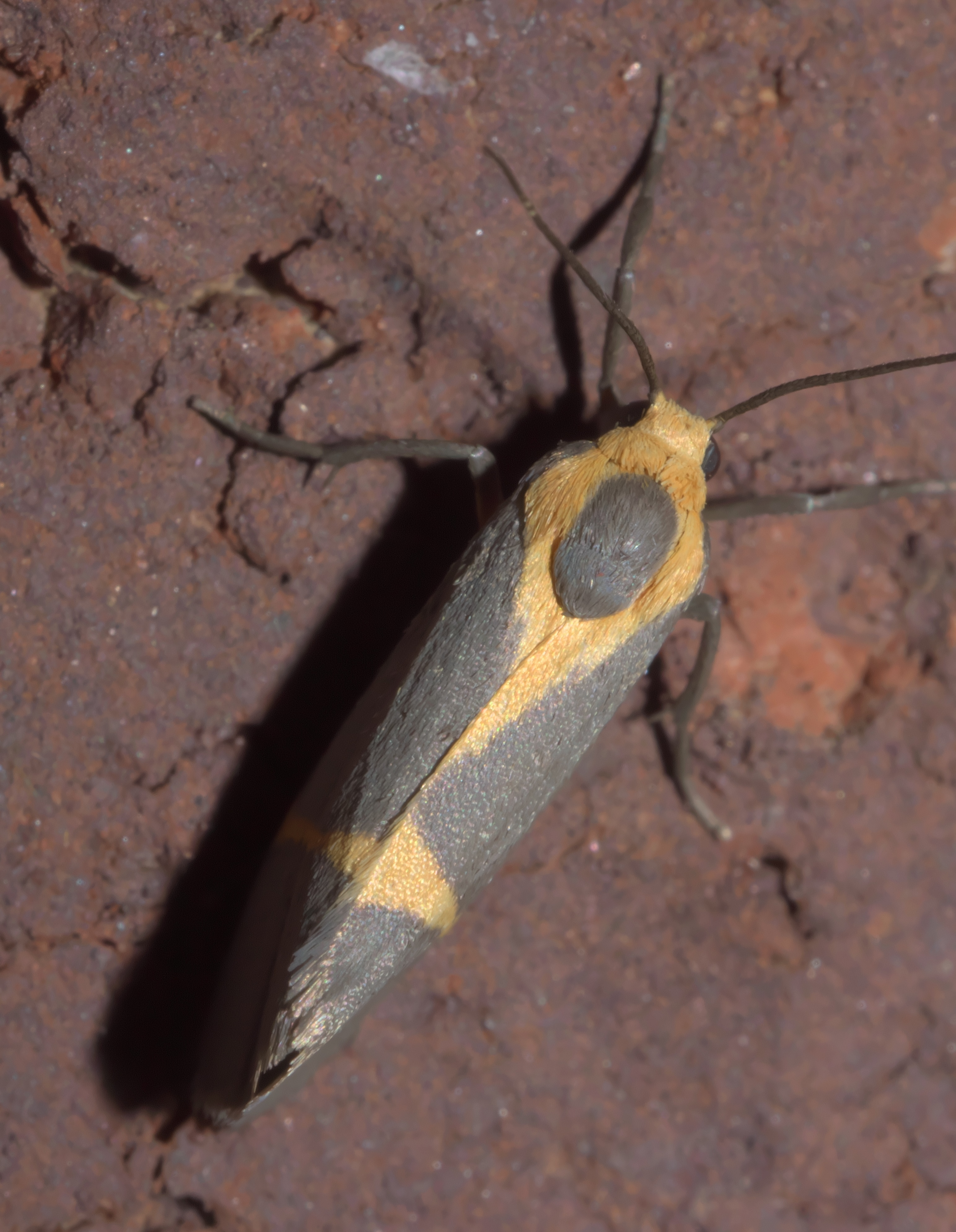

Scientific classification
- Domain: Eukaryota
- Kingdom: Animalia
- Phylum: Arthropoda
- Class: Insecta
- Order: Lepidoptera
- Superfamily: Noctuoidea
- Family: Erebidae
- Subfamily: Arctiinae
- Genus: Cisthene
- Species: C. tenuifascia

Binomial name
- Cisthene tenuifascia Harvey, 1875

Synonyms
- Ozodania schwarziorum Dyar, 1899; Illice interrupta Draudt, 1918

= Cisthene tenuifascia =

Species of moth

Cisthene tenuifascia, the thin-banded lichen moth or three-banded lichen moth, is a moth of the family Erebidae. It was described by Leon F. Harvey in 1875. It is found in Mexico and from Arizona to Florida, North Carolina and Oklahoma. Strays can be found further north.

The length of the forewings is 7–9 mm. Adults have a yellow-orange strip along the inner margin of the forewing. They are on wing from March to October and have been recorded sugaring on Baccharis sarothroides and Baccharis salicifolia.

The larvae feed on lichens and algae.
