= Cisthene subrufa =

Scientific classification
- Domain: Eukaryota
- Kingdom: Animalia
- Phylum: Arthropoda
- Class: Insecta
- Order: Lepidoptera
- Superfamily: Noctuoidea
- Family: Erebidae
- Subfamily: Arctiinae
- Genus: Cisthene
- Species: C. subrufa

Binomial name
- Cisthene subrufa (Barnes & McDunnough, 1913)

Synonyms
- Ozodania subrufa Barnes & McDunnough, 1913

Species of moth

Cisthene subrufa, the Tamaulipan lichen moth, is a moth of the family Erebidae. It was described by William Barnes and James Halliday McDunnough in 1913. It is found in the United States in Arizona and from San Benito, Texas south to Veracruz in Mexico.

The wingspan is 13–16 mm. Adults have been recorded on wing in August.
