= Brycea triplaga =

Scientific classification
- Kingdom: Animalia
- Phylum: Arthropoda
- Class: Insecta
- Order: Lepidoptera
- Superfamily: Noctuoidea
- Family: Erebidae
- Subfamily: Arctiinae
- Genus: Brycea
- Species: B. triplaga

Binomial name
- Brycea triplaga (Hampson, 1905)

Synonyms
- Cisthene triplaga Hampson, 1905 (not the same taxon as Illice triplaga, which is now in Cisthene); Eudesmia angustistriga Bryk, 1953; Brycea angustistriga

Species of moth

Brycea triplaga is a moth of the subfamily Arctiinae. It is found in Paraguay.
