= Brycea =

Scientific classification
- Kingdom: Animalia
- Phylum: Arthropoda
- Class: Insecta
- Order: Lepidoptera
- Superfamily: Noctuoidea
- Family: Erebidae
- Subfamily: Arctiinae
- Tribe: Lithosiini
- Genus: Brycea; Walker, 1854

Synonyms
- Costalimaida Orfila, 1958

Genus of moths

Brycea is a genus of moths in the subfamily Arctiinae.

== Species ==
- Brycea disjuncta
- Brycea itatiayae
- Brycea triplaga
