= List of flora of the Sonoran Desert Region by common name =

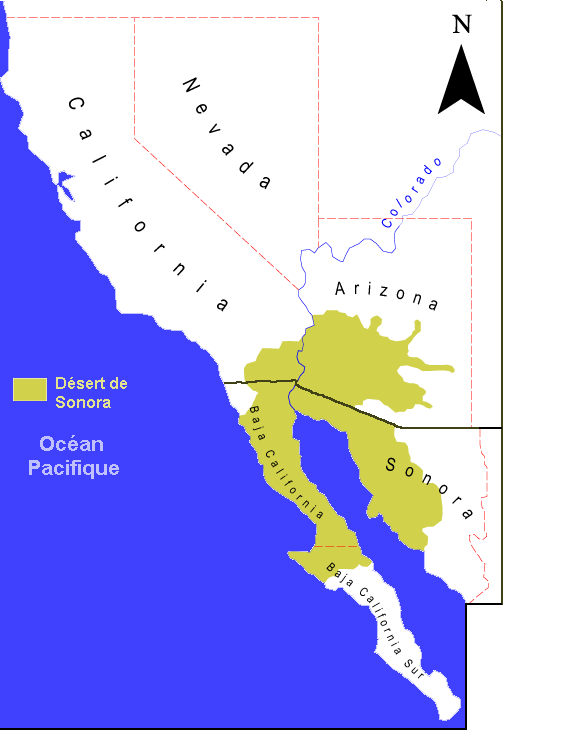
The Sonoran Desert

The Sonoran Desert is a North American desert and ecoregion which covers large parts of the southwestern United States and of northwestern Mexico. With an area of 260,000 square kilometers (100,000 sq mi), it is the hottest desert in Mexico. The western portion of the Mexico–United States border passes through the Sonoran Desert. The Sonoran Desert region includes the Sonoran Desert and some surrounding areas. All of Sonora, the Baja California Peninsula, and the islands of the Gulf of California are included. Also included are parts of Sinaloa and Chihuahua, some Pacific islands off the coast of Baja California excluding Guadalupe Island), and southern Arizona and southern California in the United States.

This region has 4,004 species of plants from 1201 genera in 182 families. Many lack common names. Many have more than one common name, but only one is listed. Native and non-native taxa are included.

== Flora with common names ==
Flora of the Sonoran Desert Region include:

=== Acanthaceae ===
- Arizona foldwing (Dicliptera resupinata)
- Arizona water-willow (Dianthera candicans)
- Arizona wrightwort (Carlowrightia arizonica)
- Baja ruellia (Ruellia peninsularis)
- beloperone (Justicia californica)
- black mangrove (Avicennia germinans)
- Browne's blechum (Ruellia blechum)
- glush weed (Hygrophila costata)
- hairy fournwort (Tetramerium nervosum)
- island renegade (Henrya insularis)
- purple scalystem (Elytraria imbricata)
- rama parda (Ruellia californica)
- siphonoglossa (Justicia longii)
- Sonoran water-willow (Justicia sonorae)
- spreading snakeherb (Dyschoriste decumbens)
- Thurber's desert honeysuckle (Anisacanthus thurberi)
- violet wild petunia (Ruellia nudiflora)
- white devilbush (Holographis virgata)

=== Achatocarpaceae ===
- devilqueen (Phaulothamnus spinescens)

=== Aizoaceae ===
- common iceplant (Mesembryanthemum crystallinum)
- desert horsepurslane (Trianthema portulacastrum)
- Hottentot fig (Carpobrotus edulis)
- shoreline seapurslane (Sesuvium portulacastrum)
- slenderleaf iceplant (Mesembryanthemum nodiflorum)
- verrucose seapurslane (Sesuvium verrucosum)

=== Alismataceae ===
- American water plantain (Alisma subcordatum)
- arumleaf arrowhead (Sagittaria cuneata)
- broadleaf arrowhead (Sagittaria latifolia)
- giant arrowhead (Sagittaria montevidensis)
- longbarb arrowhead (Sagittaria longiloba)
- upright burhead (Echinodorus berteroi)
- water poppy (Hydrocleys nymphoides)
- yellow velvetleaf (Limnocharis flava)

=== Amaranthaceae ===
- Arizona snakecotton (Froelichia arizonica)
- Australian saltbush (Atriplex semibaccata)
- Barclay's saltbush (Atriplex barclayana)
- big saltbush (Atriplex lentiformis)
- California saltbush (Atriplex californica)
- carelessweed (Amaranthus palmeri)
- cattle saltbush (Atriplex polycarpa)
- Davidson's saltbush (Atriplex pacifica)
- desert goosefoot (Chenopodium pratericola)
- desertholly (Atriplex hymenelytra)
- dwarf saltwort (Salicornia bigelovii)
- estuary seablite (Suaeda esteroa)
- fetid goosefoot (Chenopodium graveolens)
- fivehorn smotherweed (Bassia hyssopifolia)
- fourwing saltbush (Atriplex canescens)
- fringed amaranth (Amaranthus fimbriatus)
- globe amaranth (Gomphrena globosa)
- iodinebush (Allenrolfea occidentalis)
- lambsquarters (Chenopodium album)
- mat amaranth (Amaranthus blitoides)
- Mexican tea (Dysphania ambrosioides)
- Mojave seablite (Suaeda moquini)
- nettleleaf goosefoot (Chenopodium murale)
- New Mexico goosefoot (Chenopodium neomexicanum)
- Nuttall's povertyweed (Monolepis nuttalliana)
- old man saltbush (Atriplex nummularia)
- pearly globe amaranth (Gomphrena nitida)
- pickleweed (Salicornia virginica)
- Powell's amaranth (Amaranthus powellii)
- prince's feather (Amaranthus hypochondriacus)
- prostrate pigweed (Amaranthus albus)
- red amaranth (Amaranthus cruentus)
- Russian thistle (Kali tragus)
- shadscale (Atriplex confertifolia)
- slim amaranth (Amaranthus hybridus)
- Sonoran globe amaranth (Gomphrena sonorae)
- spiny hopsage (Grayia spinosa)
- Standley's bloodleaf (Iresine heterophylla)
- Texas snakecotton (Froelichia interrupta)
- washerwoman (Alternanthera caracasana)
- Watson's amaranth (Amaranthus watsonii)
- Watson's goosefoot (Chenopodium watsonii)
- wheelscale saltbush (Atriplex elegans)
- winterfat (Krascheninnikovia lanata)
- woolly seablite (Suaeda taxifolia)
- woolly tidestromia (Tidestromia lanuginosa)
- Wright's saltbush (Atriplex wrightii)

=== Amaryllidaceae ===
- cebollín (Hymenocallis pimana)
- copper zephyrlily (Zephyranthes longifolia)
- crowpoison (Nothoscordum bivalve)
- Geyer's onion (Allium geyeri)
- gland onion (Allium glandulosum)
- Kunth's onion (Allium kunthii)
- largeflower onion (Allium macropetalum)
- Mexicali onion (Allium peninsulare)
- spider lily (Hymenocallis sonorensis)
- Texas false garlic (Nothoscordum texanum)

=== Anacardiaceae ===
- African sumac (Rhus lancea)
- aigros (Rhus terebinthifolia)
- Baja elephant tree (Pachycormus discolor)
- ciruelo (Cyrtocarpa edulis)
- evergreen sumac (Rhus virens)
- fragrant sumac (Rhus aromatica)
- Kearney's sumac (Rhus kearneyi)
- laurel sumac (Malosma laurina)
- lemonadeberry (Rhus integrifolia)
- littleleaf sumac (Rhus microphylla)
- mango (Mangifera indica)
- Peruvian pepper tree (Schinus molle)
- pink-flowering sumac (Rhus lentii)
- poison ivy (Rhus radicans)
- purple mondin (Spondias purpurea)
- smooth sumac (Rhus glabra)
- sugarbush (Rhus ovata)

=== Apiaceae ===
- alpine false springparsley (Cymopterus lemmonii)
- American wild carrot (Daucus pusillus)
- Arizona eryngo (Eryngium sparganophyllum)
- bristly scaleseed (Spermolepis echinata)
- chervil (Anthriscus cerefolium)
- Chiricahua Mountain eryngo (Eryngium lemmonii)
- coriander (Coriandrum sativum)
- cow parsnip (Heracleum maximum)
- culantrillo (Daucus montanus)
- dill (Anethum graveolens)
- false carrot (Yabea microcarpa)
- fennel (Foeniculum vulgare)
- hierba del sapo (Eryngium nasturtiifolium)
- hoary bowlesia (Bowlesia incana)
- Huachuca Mountain eryngo (Eryngium phyteumae)
- large bullwort (Ammi majus)
- marsh parsley (Cyclospermum leptophyllum)
- masiaguri (Tauschia edulis)
- Mexican hemlockparsley (Conioselinum mexicanum)
- Schaffner's grasswort (Lilaeopsis schaffneriana)
- southern umbrellawort (Tauschia arguta)
- water-hemlock (Cicuta douglasii)
- western sandparsley (Ammoselinum giganteum)
- Wright's eryngo (Eryngium heterophyllum)

=== Apocynaceae ===
- Arizona bluestar (Amsonia grandiflora)
- Arizona milkvine (Gonolobus arizonicus)
- Arizona milkweed (Asclepias angustifolia)
- Arizona swallow-wort (Metastelma arizonicum)
- bloodflower milkweed (Asclepias curassavica)
- bract milkweed (Asclepias brachystephana)
- California milkweed (Asclepias californica)
- citavaro (Vallesia laciniata)
- cockroachplant (Haplophyton cimicidum)
- Davis Mountain rocktrumpet (Mandevilla hypoleuca)
- desert milkweed (Asclepias erosa)
- fringed twinevine (Funastrum cynanchoides)
- hierba de piojo (Mandevilla foliosa)
- horsetail milkweed (Asclepias subverticillata)
- Huachuca Mountain rocktrumpet (Macrosiphonia brachysiphon)
- Kearney's bluestar (Amsonia kearneyana)
- Lemmon's milkweed (Asclepias lemmonii)
- mahogany milkweed (Asclepias hypoleuca)
- Mexican swallow-wort (Cynanchum ligulatum)
- Mojave milkweed (Asclepias nyctaginifolia)
- Nacapule rocktrumpet (Mandevilla nacapulensis)
- narrowleaf milkweed (Asclepias fascicularis)
- nodding milkweed (Asclepias glaucescens)
- oleander (Nerium oleander)
- Palmer's bluestar (Amsonia palmeri)
- pineneedle milkweed (Asclepias linaria)
- plateau rocktrumpet (Mandevilla lanuginosa)
- plumeria (Plumeria rubra)
- rubber vine (Cryptostegia grandiflora)
- rush milkweed (Asclepias subulata)
- showy milkweed (Asclepias speciosa)
- slimpod milkweed (Asclepias quinquedentata)
- smooth vallesia (Vallesia glabra)
- Sonoran milkvine (Matelea cordifolia)
- spearleaf (Matelea parvifolia)
- Texas milkvine (Matelea producta)
- tufted milkweed (Asclepias nummularia)
- wavyleaf twinevine (Funastrum crispum)
- whitestem milkweed (Asclepias albicans)
- white twinevine (Funastrum clausum)
- Wiggins' swallow-wort (Metastelma mexicanum)
- woolly bluestar (Amsonia tomentosa)
- woollypod milkweed (Asclepias eriocarpa)
- yellow oleander (Thevetia peruviana)
- zizotes milkweed (Asclepias oenotheroides)

=== Aquifoliaceae ===
- holly (Ilex rubra)

=== Araceae ===
- common duckweed (Lemna minor)
- least duckweed (Lemna minuta)
- lesser duckweed (Lemna aequinoctialis)
- common duckmeat (Spirodela polyrrhiza)

=== Araliaceae ===
- Algerian ivy (Hedera canariensis)
- angelica tree (Dendropanax arboreus)
- Arizona spikenard (Aralia humilis)
- floating marshpennywort (Hydrocotyle ranunculoides)
- manyflower marshpennywort (Hydrocotyle umbellata)
- papaya cimarrona (Oreopanax peltatum)
- tropical marshpennywort (Hydrocotyle pusilla)
- whorled marshpennywort (Hydrocotyle prolifera)

=== Arecaceae ===
- apak palm (Brahea dulcis)
- babisa (Brahea brandegeei)
- blue hesper palm (Brahea armata)
- California fan palm (Washingtonia filifera)
- Mexican fan palm (Washingtonia robusta)
- date palm (Phoenix dactylifera)
- Sinaloa hesper palm (Brahea aculeata)
- Sonoran blue palm (Brahea nitida)
- Sonoran palmetto (Sabal uresana)

=== Aristolochiaceae ===
- calico flower (Aristolochia littoralis)
- canastilla (Aristolochia taliscana)
- hierba del indio (Aristolochia quercetorum)
- southwestern pipevine (Aristolochia brevipes)
- Watson's Dutchman's pipe (Aristolochia watsonii)

=== Asparagaceae ===
- American century plant (Agave americana)
- Arizona agave (Agave arizonica)
- azucena del monte (Echeandia ramosissima)
- banana yucca (Yucca baccata)
- Bigelow's nolina (Nolina bigelovii)
- bluedicks (Dipterostemon capitatus)
- chahuiqui (Agave multifilifera)
- chaparral yucca (Hesperoyucca whipplei)
- common sotol (Dasylirion wheeleri)
- cowhorn agave (Agave bovicornuta)
- datilillo (Agave datylio)
- Dehesa beargrass (Nolina interrata)
- desert agave (Agave deserti)
- desert lily (Hesperocallis undulata)
- golden agave (Agave chrysoglossa)
- goldenflower century plant (Agave chrysantha)
- Ithuriel's spear (Triteleia laxa)
- jaiboli (Agave jaiboli)
- Joshua tree (Yucca brevifolia)
- large-flowered yucca (Yucca grandiflora)
- McKelvey agave (Agave mckelveyana)
- mescal ceniza (Agave colorata)
- mescalito (Agave felgeri)
- Mexican star (Milla biflora)
- Mojave yucca (Yucca schidigera)
- mountain yucca (Yucca schottii)
- Murphey's century plant (Agave murpheyi)
- narrowleaf agave (Agave angustifolia)
- Navajo yucca (Yucca baileyi)
- Nelson's beargrass (Nolina nelsonii)
- night-flowering hesperaloe (Hesperaloe nocturna)
- ocahui (Agave ocahui)
- octopus agave (Agave vilmoriniana)
- Palmer's century plant (Agave palmeri)
- Palmer's craglily (Echeandia palmeri)
- Palmer's Bajalily (Triteleiopsis palmeri)
- Palmer's beargrass (Nolina palmeri)
- Parry's agave (Agave parryi)
- Parry's beargrass (Nolina parryi)
- pink funnel lily (Androstephium breviflorum)
- sacahuista (Nolina microcarpa)
- Schott's century plant (Agave schottii)
- Shaw's agave (Agave shawii)
- Sierra Madre yucca (Yucca madrensis)
- small-flowered beargrass (Nolina parviflora)
- Texas sacahuista (Nolina texana)
- Tonto Basin agave (Agave delamateri)
- Torrey's craglily (Echeandia flavescens)
- Toumey's century plant (Agave toumeyana)
- tree beargrass (Nolina matapensis)
- tree yucca (Yucca valida)
- tuberose-flowered agave (Agave polianthiflora)
- Utah agave (Agave utahensis)
- zebra agave (Agave zebra)

=== Asphodelaceae ===
- Aloe vera (Aloe vera)
- common marsh poker (Kniphofia linearifolia)
- onionweed (Asphodelus fistulosus)

=== Aspleniaceae ===
- blackstem spleenwort (Asplenium resiliens)
- Countess Dalhousie's spleenwort (Asplenium dalhousiae)
- dwarf spleenwort (Asplenium pumilum)
- little spleenwort (Asplenium exiguum)
- Palmer's spleenwort (Asplenium palmeri)
- singlesorus spleenwort (Asplenium monanthes)

=== Asteraceae ===
- Abert's creeping zinnia (Sanvitalia abertii)
- African sheepbush (Pentzia incana)
- alkali marsh aster (Almutaster pauciflorus)
- American everlasting (Gamochaeta americana)
- American tarwort (Flourensia cernua)
- American threefold (Trixis californica)
- annual candyleaf (Stevia micrantha)
- annual monsterwort (Parthenice mollis)
- Apache beggarticks (Bidens ferulaefolia)
- Apache plant (Guardiola platyphylla)
- arid tansyaster (Machaeranthera arida)
- arid throne fleabane (Erigeron arisolius)
- Arizona baccharis (Baccharis thesioides)
- Arizona beggarticks (Bidens aurea)
- Arizona blackfoot (Melampodium longicorne)
- Arizona blanketflower (Gaillardia arizonica)
- Arizona cudweed (Pseudognaphalium arizonicum)
- Arizona fluffweed (Filago arizonica)
- Arizona snakeweed (Gutierrezia arizonica)
- Arizona sunflowerweed (Tithonia thurberi)
- Arizona thistle (Cirsium arizonicum)
- arrowweed (Pluchea sericea)
- asthmaweed (Conyza bonariensis)
- Aztec marigold (Tagetes erecta)
- Baja bush sunflower (Encelia ventorum)
- beardless cinchweed (Pectis imberbis)
- betonyleaf brickellbush (Brickellia betonicifolia)
- Bigelow's beggarticks (Bidens bigelovii)
- Bigelow's bristlehead (Carphochaete bigelovii)
- blessed milkthistle (Silybum marianum)
- brightwhite (Prenanthella exigua)
- brittlebush (Encelia farinosa)
- broom snakeweed (Gutierrezia sarothrae)
- brownfoot (Acourtia wrightii)
- brownplume wirelettuce (Stephanomeria pauciflora)
- brownturbans (Malperia tenuis)
- burrobush (Ambrosia salsola)
- burroweed (Ambrosia dumosa)
- button brittlebush (Encelia frutescens)
- California brittlebush (Encelia californica)
- California chicory (Rafinesquia californica)
- California cottonrose (Filago californica)
- California goldfields (Lasthenia californica)
- California rockdaisy (Perityle californica)
- camphorweed (Heterotheca subaxillaris)
- Canadian horseweed (Conyza canadensis)
- canyon ragweed (Ambrosia ambrosioides)
- Cape marigold (Dimorphotheca tragus)
- changing fleabane (Erigeron versicolor)
- chaparral fleabane (Erigeron oreophilus)
- Chihuahuan fleabane (Erigeron velutipes)
- chicory (Cichorium intybus)
- chicoryleaf wirelettuce (Stephanomeria cichoriacea)
- Cleveland's desertdandelion (Malacothrix clevelandii)
- coastal tidy tips (Layia platyglossa)
- Cochise marshtail (Laennecia eriophylla)
- common goldenbush (Isocoma coronopifolia)
- common sowthistle (Sonchus oleraceus)
- common sunflower (Helianthus annuus)
- common yarrow (Achillea millefolium)
- common zinnia (Zinnia elegans)
- Cooper's dogweed (Adenophyllum cooperi)
- Cooper's goldenbush (Ericameria cooperi)
- cottonbatting plant (Pseudognaphalium stramineum)
- Coulter's brickellbush (Brickellia coulteri)
- Coulter's chinchweed (Pectis coulteri)
- Coulter's horseweed (Laennecia coulteri)
- crowndaisy (Glebionis coronaria)
- Cuman ragweed (Ambrosia psilostachya)
- cure for all (Pluchea carolinensis)
- cutleaf ironplant (Xanthisma spinulosum)
- daisy desertstar (Monoptilon bellidiforme)
- desert baccharis (Baccharis sergiloides)
- desertbroom (Baccharis sarothroides)
- desert coreopsis (Leptosyne bigelovii)
- desert cudweed (Gamochaeta stagnalis)
- desert Indianbush (Psacalium decompositum)
- desert marigold (Baileya multiradiata)
- desert palafox (Palafoxia arida)
- desert twinbugs (Dicoria canescens)
- desert zinnia (Zinnia acerosa)
- doll's head (Lagascea decipiens)
- dwarf coyote brush (Baccharis pilularis)
- dwarf desertpeony (Acourtia nana)
- dwarf filago (Filago depressa)
- earleaf brickellbush (Brickellia amplexicaulis)
- eastern annual saltmarsh aster (Symphyotrichum subulatum)
- Emory's baccharis (Baccharis salicina)
- Emory's rockdaisy (Perityle emoryi)
- espantamula (Acourtia dieringeri)
- Esteve's pincushion (Chaenactis stevioides)
- everlasting neststraw (Stylocline gnaphaloides)
- false boneset (Brickellia eupatorioides)
- false daisy (Eclipta prostrata)
- Felger crownbeard (Verbesina felgeri)
- Fendler's desertdandelion (Malacothrix fendleri)
- fewflower beggarticks (Bidens leptocephala)
- Flagstaff ragwort (Packera actinella, syn. Senecio actinella)
- flatspine burr ragweed (Ambrosia acanthicarpa)
- flat-top whiteweed (Ageratum corymbosum)
- fragrant snakeroot (Ageratina herbacea)
- Frémont pincushion (Chaenactis fremontii)
- fringed rockdaisy (Perityle ciliata)
- gachupín (Sclerocarpus spathulatus)
- gallant soldier (Galinsoga parviflora)
- garden cosmos (Cosmos bipinnatus)
- glandular Cape marigold (Dimorphotheca sinuata)
- golden crownbeard (Verbesina encelioides)
- goldenfleece (Ericameria arborescens)
- grassleaf lettuce (Lactuca graminifolia)
- green rabbitbrush (Ericameria teretifolia)
- Guadalupe Island rockdaisy (Perityle incana)
- guayule (Parthenium argentatum)
- gumhead (Gymnosperma glutinosum)
- hairy beggarticks (Bidens pilosa)
- hairy leafcup (Smallanthus uvedalius)
- Hartweg's groundsel (Roldana hartwegii)
- hoary tansyaster (Machaeranthera canescens)
- hollyleaf burr ragweed (Ambrosia ilicifolia)
- hollyleaf bursage (Ambrosia eriocentra)
- Hopi tea greenthread (Thelesperma megapotamicum)
- Irish lace (Tagetes filifolia)
- Jersey cudweed (Pseudognaphalium luteoalbum)
- Kellogg's tarweed (Hemizonia kelloggii)
- lavender cotton (Santolina chamaecyparissus)
- laxflower (Baileya pauciradiata)
- leafy marshtail (Laennecia sophiifolia)
- Lemmon's beggarticks (Bidens lemmonii)
- Lemmon's hawkweed (Hieracium crepidispermum)
- Lemmon's marigold (Tagetes lemmonii)
- Lemmon's ragwort (Senecio lemmonii)
- Lemmon's rockdaisy (Perityle lemmonii)
- Lemmon's snakeroot (Ageratina lemmonii)
- licorice marigold (Tagetes micrantha)
- Lindley's silver puffs (Uropappus lindleyi)
- lobed fleabane (Erigeron lobatus)
- longleaf crownbeard (Verbesina longifolia)
- longleaf false goldeneye (Heliomeris longifolia)
- Macoun's cudweed (Pseudognaphalium macounii)
- Maltese star-thistle (Centaurea melitensis)
- manybristle cinchweed (Pectis papposa)
- mariola (Parthenium incanum)
- Maximilian sunflower (Helianthus maximiliani)
- Mayo groundsel (Senecio riomayensis)
- mesa tansyaster (Machaeranthera tagetina)
- Mexican camphorweed (Pluchea salicifolia)
- Mexican coneflower (Ratibida mexicana)
- Mexican flame vine (Pseudogynoxys chenopodioides)
- Mexican tansyaster (Psilactis gentryi)
- Mexican tarragon (Tagetes lucida)
- Mexican tree sunflower (Tithonia fruticosa)
- Mojave cottonthorn (Tetradymia stenolepis)
- Mojave desertstar (Monoptilon bellioides)
- mountain dahlia (Dahlia coccinea)
- mountain oxeye (Heliopsis parvifolia)
- mountain ragwort (Senecio parryi)
- mulefat (Baccharis salicifolia)
- narrowleaf goldenbush (Ericameria linearifolia)
- narrowleaf zinnia (Zinnia angustifolia)
- netvein goldeneye (Bahiopsis reticulata)
- New Mexico fleabane (Erigeron neomexicanus)
- New Mexico groundsel (Packera neomexicana)
- New Mexico plumeseed (Rafinesquia neomexicana)
- New Mexico thistle (Cirsium neomexicanum)
- orange sneezeweed (Hymenoxys hoopesii)
- owl's crown (Gamochaeta sphacelata)
- Palmer's umbrella thoroughwort (Koanophyllon palmeri)
- palmleaf thoroughwort (Conoclinium greggii)
- parachute plant (Atrichoseris platyphylla)
- Parish goldeneye (Viguiera parishii)
- Peruvian zinnia (Zinnia peruviana)
- pineappleweed (Matricaria discoidea)
- pineland marshtail (Laennecia schiedeana)
- pinnate false threadleaf (Schkuhria pinnata)
- plains blackfoot (Melampodium leucanthum)
- plains fleabane (Erigeron modestus)
- plumeweed (Carminatia tenuiflora)
- Plummer's candyleaf (Stevia plummerae)
- poreleaf dogweed (Adenophyllum porophyllum)
- prairie sagewort (Artemisia frigida)
- prairie sunflower (Helianthus petiolaris)
- pricklyleaf dogweed (Thymophylla acerosa)
- prickly lettuce (Lactuca serriola)
- Pringle's brickellbush (Brickellia pringlei)
- Pringle's cudweed (Pseudognaphalium pringlei)
- Pringle's hawkweed (Hieracium pringlei)
- Pringle's woolly sunflower (Eriophyllum pringlei)
- ragged marsh-elder (Hedosyne ambrosiifolia)
- resinleaf brickellbush (Brickellia baccharidea)
- Rocky Mountain beggarticks (Bidens heterosperma)
- Rocky Mountain zinnia (Zinnia grandiflora)
- romero macho (Pectis linifolia)
- rose heath (Leucelene ericoides)
- Rothrock's knapweed (Centaurea rothrockii)
- Rothrock's snakeroot (Ageratina rothrockii)
- rough blackfoot (Melampodium sericeum)
- rough cocklebur (Xanthium strumarium)
- rubber rabbitbrush (Ericameria nauseosa)
- running fleabane (Erigeron tracyi)
- Rusby's cinchweed (Pectis rusbyi)
- Rusby's hawkweed (Hieracium abscissum)
- Rutter's false goldenaster (Heterotheca rutteri)
- safflower (Carthamus tinctorius)
- San Diego sunflower (Bahiopsis laciniata)
- San Diego wirelettuce (Stephanomeria diegensis)
- San Pedro daisy (Lasianthaea podocephala)
- Santa Maria feverfew (Parthenium hysterophorus)
- Santa Rita Mountain aster (Symphyotrichum potosinum)
- Santa Rita snakeroot (Ageratina paupercula)
- sawtooth candyleaf (Stevia serrata)
- scalebud (Anisocoma acaulis)
- scepterbearing fleabane (Erigeron sceptrifer)
- Schott's pygmycedar (Peucephyllum schottii)
- Seeman's sunbonnets (Leibnitzia lyrata)
- shaggy blackfoot (Melampodium strigosum)
- shaggy soldier (Galinsoga quadriradiata)
- shortleaf baccharis (Baccharis brachyphylla)
- shortray rockdaisy (Perityle microglossa)
- showy sunflower (Helianthus niveus)
- shrine jimmyweed (Isocoma tenuisecta)
- shrubby thoroughwort (Koanophyllon solidaginifolium)
- Siam weed (Chromolaena odorata)
- singlewhorl burrobrush (Hymenoclea monogyra)
- slender poreleaf (Porophyllum gracile)
- slimleaf bursage (Ambrosia confertiflora)
- slimlobe beggarticks (Bidens tenuisecta)
- smallflower desert-chicory (Pyrrhopappus pauciflorus)
- smallflower tansyaster (Machaeranthera parviflora)
- small wirelettuce (Stephanomeria exigua)
- smooth beggarticks (Bidens laevis)
- smooth desertdandelion (Malacothrix glabrata)
- snake's head (Malacothrix coulteri)
- Sonoran brickellbush (Brickellia simplex)
- Sonoran bursage (Ambrosia cordifolia)
- Sonoran cinchweed (Pectis cylindrica)
- Sonoran desertdandelion (Malacothrix sonorae)
- Sonoran neststraw (Stylocline sonorensis)
- Sonoran pricklyleaf (Thymophylla concinna)
- Sonoran thoroughwort (Fleischmannia sonorae)
- southern annual saltmarsh aster (Symphyotrichum divaricatum)
- southern goldenbush (Isocoma pluriflora)
- southwestern cosmos (Cosmos parviflorus)
- Spanish needles (Bidens alba)
- spearleaf brickellbush (Brickellia atractyloides)
- spineless horsebrush (Tetradymia canescens)
- spiny chloracantha (Chloracantha spinosa)
- spiny sowthistle (Sonchus asper)
- spoonleaf purple everlasting (Gamochaeta purpurea)
- spreading cinchweed (Pectis prostrata)
- spreading fleabane (Erigeron divergens)
- spring pygmy-cudweed (Diaperia verna)
- Stebbins' desertdandelion (Malacothrix stebbinsii)
- stemless four-nerve daisy (Tetraneuris acaulis)
- sticky brittlebush (Encelia resinifera)
- stinking brickellbush (Brickellia rusbyi)
- straggler daisy (Calyptocarpus vialis)
- sulphur cosmos (Cosmos sulphureus)
- sweetbush (Bebbia juncea)
- Tahoka daisy (Machaeranthera tanacetifolia)
- tarragon (Artemisia dracunculus)
- tasselflower brickellbush (Brickellia grandiflora)
- Texas blueweed (Helianthus ciliaris)
- threadleaf ragwort (Senecio flaccidus)
- threadleaf snakeweed (Gutierrezia microcephala)
- Thurber's desertpeony (Acourtia thurberi)
- Thurber's sneezeweed (Helenium thurberi)
- Thurber's wirelettuce (Stephanomeria thurberi)
- toothleaf goldeneye (Viguiera dentata)
- trailing fleabane (Erigeron flagellaris)
- Trans-Pecos thimblehead (Hymenothrix wislizeni)
- triangle-leaf bursage (Ambrosia deltoidea)
- turpentine bush (Ericameria laricifolia)
- upright prairie coneflower (Ratibida columnifera)
- veiny brickellbush (Brickellia venosa)
- velvet turtleback (Psathyrotes ramosissima)
- veronicaleaf brickellbush (Brickellia veronicifolia)
- Virgin River brittlebush (Encelia virginensis)
- viscid candyleaf (Stevia viscida)
- Wallace's woolly daisy (Eriophyllum wallacei)
- western pearly everlasting (Anaphalis margaritacea)
- white cudweed (Pseudognaphalium leucocephalum)
- whitedaisy tidytips (Layia glandulosa)
- whitemargin pussytoes (Antennaria marginata)
- white sagebrush (Artemisia ludoviciana)
- whitestem paperflower (Psilostrophe cooperi)
- white tackstem (Calycoseris wrightii)
- white woolly daisy (Eriophyllum lanosum)
- willowleaf aster (Symphyotrichum praealtum)
- willow ragwort (Barkleyanthus salicifolius)
- wingpetal (Heterosperma pinnatum)
- woolly brickellbush (Brickellia incana)
- woolly desert marigold (Baileya pleniradiata)
- woolly eriophyllum (Antheropeas lanosum)
- woollyhead neststraw (Stylocline micropoides)
- woolly paperflower (Psilostrophe tagetina)
- Wooton's ragwort (Senecio wootonii)
- Wright's baccharis (Baccharis wrightii)
- Wright's goldenrod (Solidago wrightii)
- Wright's snakeweed (Gutierrezia wrightii)
- Wright's thimblehead (Hymenothrix wrightii)
- yellowdome (Trichoptilium incisum)
- yellow pincushion (Chaenactis glabriuscula)
- yellowspine thistle (Cirsium ochrocentrum)
- yellow starthistle (Centaurea solstitialis)
- yellow tackstem (Calycoseris parryi)
- yerba porosa (Porophyllum ruderale)
- zoapatle (Montanoa tomentosa)

=== Bataceae ===
- saltwort (Batis maritima)

=== Berberidaceae ===
- creeping barberry (Berberis repens)
- Frémont's barberry (Berberis fremontii)
- Harrison's barberry (Berberis harrisoniana)
- Nevin's barberry (Berberis nevinii)
- red barberry (Berberis haematocarpa)
- Wilcox's barberry (Berberis wilcoxii)

=== Betulaceae ===
- aliso (Alnus acuminata)
- American hophornbeam (Ostrya virginiana)
- Arizona alder (Alnus oblongifolia)
- gray alder (Alnus incana)

=== Bignoniaceae ===
- catclaw (Dolichandra unguis-cati)
- desert willow (Chilopsis linearis)
- Mexican calabash (Crescentia alata)
- pink tabebuia (Handroanthus impetiginosus)
- trumpet creeper (Campsis radicans)
- yellow tabebuia (Tabebuia chrysantha)
- yellow trumpetbush (Tecoma stans)

=== Bixaceae ===
- Mexican yellowshow (Amoreuxia palmatifida)
- Santa Rita mountain yellowshow (Amoreuxia gonzalezii)
- silk cottontree (Cochlospermum vitifolium)

=== Blechnaceae ===
- palm fern (Blechnum appendiculatum)

=== Boraginaceae ===
- adobe popcornflower (Plagiobothrys acanthocarpus)
- Arizona phacelia (Phacelia arizonica)
- Arizona popcornflower (Plagiobothrys arizonicus)
- basin yellow cryptantha (Cryptantha confertiflora)
- bastard cherry (Ehretia tinifolia)
- bearded cryptantha (Cryptantha barbigera)
- black-sage (Cordia curassavica)
- bristly fiddleneck (Amsinckia tessellata)
- broadfruit combseed (Pectocarya platycarpa)
- bushy heliotrope (Heliotropium ternatum)
- Caracus wigandia (Wigandia urens)
- chuckwalla combseed (Pectocarya heterocarpa)
- cleftleaf wildheliotrope (Phacelia crenulata)
- curaciao bush (Cordia globosa)
- curvenut combseed (Pectocarya recurvata)
- dainty desert hideseed (Eucrypta micrantha)
- desert Canterbury bells (Phacelia campanularia)
- distant phacelia (Phacelia distans)
- fivespot (Nemophila maculata)
- flatspine stickseed (Lappula occidentalis)
- Franciscan bluebells (Mertensia franciscana)
- Frémont's phacelia (Phacelia fremontii)
- fulvous popcornflower (Plagiobothrys fulvus)
- giant-trumpets (Macromeria viridiflora = Lithospermum macromeria)
- gravelbar cryptantha (Cryptantha decipiens)
- green stoneseed (Lithospermum viride)
- Guadalupe cryptantha (Cryptantha maritima)
- hiddenflower phacelia (Phacelia cryptantha)
- Jamaicanweed (Nama jamaicense)
- Key West heliotrope (Heliotropium fruticosum)
- lacy phacelia (Phacelia tanacetifolia)
- largeflower phacelia (Phacelia grandiflora)
- limestone phacelia (Phacelia affinis)
- Menzies' fiddleneck (Amsinckia menziesii)
- mountain balm (Eriodictyon trichocalyx)
- narrowleaf yerba santa (Eriodictyon angustifolium)
- Palmer's grapplinghook (Harpagonella palmeri)
- palo de asta (Cordia sonorae)
- Panamint cryptantha (Cryptantha angustifolia)
- pedicellate phacelia (Phacelia pedicellata)
- Pringle's popcornflower (Plagiobothrys pringlei)
- salt heliotrope (Heliotropium curassavicum)
- sandfood (Pholisma sonorae)
- scorpion's tail (Heliotropium angiospermum)
- skyblue phacelia (Phacelia caerulea)
- sleeping popcornflower (Plagiobothrys hispidulus)
- small-leaf geigertree (Cordia parvifolia)
- smooththroat stoneseed (Lithospermum cobrense)
- spotted hideseed (Eucrypta chrysanthemifolia)
- tatachinole (Tournefortia hartwegiana)
- twining soldierbush (Tournefortia volubilis)
- valley popcornflower (Plagiobothrys canescens)
- violincillo (Heliotropium macrostachyum)
- whitewhisker fiddleleaf (Nama stenocarpa, syn. Nama undulata A.Gray)
- wingnut cryptantha (Cryptantha pterocarya)

=== Brassicaceae ===
- alpine pennycress (Noccaea fendleri)
- Asian mustard (Brassica tournefortii)
- black mustard (Rhamphospermum nigrum)
- blunt tansymustard (Descurainia obtusa)
- California mustard (Caulanthus lasiophyllus)
- California shieldpod (Dithyrea californica)
- charlock (Rhamphospermum arvense)
- crossflower (Chorispora tenella)
- cultivated radish (Raphanus sativus)
- eared hedgemustard (Sisymbrium auriculatum)
- evening-scented stock (Matthiola longipetala)
- field mustard (Brassica rapa)
- Gordon's bladderpod (Physaria gordonii)
- herb sophia (Descurainia sophia)
- India mustard (Brassica juncea)
- Indian hedgemustard (Sisymbrium orientale)
- lesser swinecress (Lepidium didymum)
- little bladderpod (Physaria tenella)
- London rocket (Sisymbrium irio)
- longleaf mock thelypody (Pennellia longifolia)
- Long Valley tumblemustard (Thelypodiopsis ambigua)
- peppergrass (Lepidium virginicum)
- perennial rockcress (Boechera perennans)
- rocketsalad (Eruca vesicaria)
- sanddune wallflower (Erysimum capitatum)
- sand fringepod (Thysanocarpus curvipes)
- shepherd's purse (Capsella bursa-pastoris)
- slimleaf plainsmustard (Schoenocrambe linearifolia)
- southern marsh yellowcress (Rorippa teres)
- sweet alyssum (Lobularia maritima)
- Thurber's pepperweed (Lepidium thurberi)
- watercress (Nasturtium officinale)
- wedgeleaf draba (Draba cuneifolia)
- western tansymustard (Descurainia pinnata)
- white bladderpod (Physaria purpurea)
- wild radish (Raphanus raphanistrum)

=== Bromeliaceae ===
- agu mara (Bromelia alsodes)
- datillo (Hechtia montana)
- flor de encino (Tillandsia erubescens)
- mescal (Tillandsia caput-medusae)
- mezcalito (Tillandsia cretacea)
- small ballmoss (Tillandsia recurvata)

=== Burseraceae ===
- elemi-gum (Bursera penicillata)
- fragrant bursera (Bursera fagaroides)
- gumbo-limbo (Bursera simaruba)
- littleleaf elephant tree (Bursera microphylla)
- palo mulato (Bursera grandifolia)
- red elephant tree (Bursera hindsiana)
- tacamaca (Bursera lancifolia)
- torote (Bursera filicifolia)
- torote blanco (Bursera stenophylla)
- torote papelío (Bursera laxiflora)

=== Cactaceae ===
- Alamos barrel cactus (Ferocactus alamosanus)
- Arizona claret-cup cactus (Echinocereus arizonicus)
- Arizona pencil cholla (Cylindropuntia arbuscula)
- Arizona queen of the night (Peniocereus greggii)
- Arizona spinystar (Pelecyphora vivipara)
- beavertail cactus (Opuntia basilaris)
- Bonker hedgehog cactus (Echinocereus bonkerae)
- Brady's pincushion cactus (Pediocactus bradyi)
- branched pencil cholla (Cylindropuntia ramosissima)
- brittle prickly pear (Opuntia fragilis)
- buckhorn cholla (Cylindropuntia acanthocarpa)
- bunny ears (Opuntia microdasys)
- cactus apple (Opuntia engelmannii)
- California barrel cactus (Ferocactus cylindraceus)
- California cholla (Cylindropuntia californica)
- California fishhook cactus (Mammillaria dioica)
- candelabra cactus (Myrtillocactus cochal)
- candle cholla (Cylindropuntia kleiniae)
- candy barrel cactus (Ferocactus wislizeni)
- casa de rata (Echinocereus brandegeei)
- chain-link cholla (Cylindropuntia cholla)
- Christmas cholla (Cylindropuntia leptocaulis)
- club cholla (Corynopuntia clavata)
- chaparral prickly pear (Opuntia oricola)
- choyita (Echinocereus scheeri)
- coastal cholla (Cylindropuntia prolifera)
- coastal prickly pear (Opuntia littoralis)
- cochineal nopal cactus (Opuntia cochenillifera)
- Cochise foxtail cactus (Pelecyphora robbinsiorum)
- common fishhook cactus (Cochemiea tetrancistra)
- cottontop cactus (Homalocephala polycephala, syn. Echinocactus polycephalus)
- counterclockwise nipple cactus (Cochemiea mainiae)
- creeping devil (Stenocereus eruca)
- devil cholla (Corynopuntia emoryi)
- devil's club cholla (Grusonia invicta)
- devilshead (Echinocactus horizonthalonius)
- devilthorn (Echinocereus pseudopectinatus)
- dollarjoint prickly pear (Opuntia chlorotica)
- Durango prickly pear (Opuntia durangensis)
- dwarf organpipe cactus (Stenocereus littoralis)
- Emory's barrel cactus (Ferocactus emoryi)
- Engelmann's hedgehog cactus (Echinocereus engelmannii)
- fire barrel cactus (Ferocactus gracilis)
- Ford barrel cactus (Ferocactus fordii)
- galloping cactus (Stenocereus gummosus)
- Gander's buckhorn cholla (Cylindropuntia ganderi)
- gearstem cactus (Peniocereus striatus)
- golden prickly pear (Opuntia aurea)
- golden-spined barrel cactus (Ferocactus chrysacanthus)
- golden torch (Bergerocactus emoryi)
- Graham's nipple cactus (Mammillaria grahamii)
- greenflower nipple cactus (Cochemiea barbata)
- greenflower nipple cactus (Cochemiea viridiflora)
- hecho (Pachycereus pecten-aboriginum)
- hybrid teddy bear cholla (Cylindropuntia fosbergii)
- Johnson's fishhook cactus (Sclerocactus johnsonii)
- jumping cholla (Cylindropuntia fulgida)
- Kaibab pediocactus (Pediocactus paradinei)
- kingcup cactus (Echinocereus triglochidiatus)
- Kunze's club cholla (Corynopuntia kunzei)
- lacespine nipple cactus (Mammillaria lasiacantha)
- Lau hedgehog cactus (Echinocereus laui)
- Leding hedgehog cactus (Echinocereus ledingii)
- little nipple cactus (Mammillaria heyderi)
- long-tubercle beehive cactus (Coryphantha robustispina)
- Macdougal's nipple cactus (Mammillaria macdougalii)
- marblefruit prickly pear (Opuntia strigil)
- maritime hedgehog cactus (Echinocereus maritimus)
- matted cholla (Corynopuntia parishii)
- Mexican giant cardon (Pachycereus pringlei)
- Mexican night-blooming cereus (Peniocereus serpentinus)
- Missouri foxtail cactus (Pelecyphora missouriensis)
- Munz's cholla (Cylindropuntia munzii)
- Navajo pincushion cactus (Pediocactus peeblesianus)
- Orcutt's foxtail cactus (Pelecyphora sneedii)
- organpipe cactus (Stenocereus thurberi)
- paperspine fishhook cactus (Sclerocactus papyracanthus)
- pencil cholla (Cylindropuntia tesajo)
- ping-pong ball cactus (Epithelantha micromeris)
- Pinkava's prickly pear (Opuntia pinkavae)
- pinkflower hedgehog cactus (Echinocereus fendleri)
- plains prickly pear (Opuntia polyacantha)
- purple prickly pear (Opuntia macrocentra)
- rainbow hedgehog cactus (Echinocereus rigidissimus)
- redspine fishhook cactus (Sclerocactus johnsonii subsp. erectocentrus)
- reina de la noche (Peniocereus marianus)
- sagebrush cholla (Micropuntia pulchella)
- saguaro (Carnegiea gigantea)
- sahuira (Stenocereus montanus)
- San Diego barrel cactus (Ferocactus viridescens)
- San Esteban hedgehog cactus (Echinocereus grandis)
- San Esteban pincushion (Cochemiea estebanensis)
- San Pedro Nolasco hedgehog cactus (Echinocereus websterianus)
- Santa Cruz beehive cactus (Coryphantha recurvata)
- sarramatraca (Peniocereus johnstonii)
- Santa Rita prickly pear (Opuntia santa-rita)
- scarlet hedgehog cactus (Echinocereus coccineus)
- senita cactus (Lophocereus schottii)
- Sheldon's pincushion (Mammillaria sheldonii)
- Siler pincushion cactus (Pediocactus sileri)
- silver cholla (Cylindropuntia echinocarpa)
- sina (Stenocereus alamosensis)
- sina voladora (Selenicereus vagans)
- smallflower fishhook cactus (Sclerocactus parviflorus)
- snake cactus (Echinocereus pensilis)
- Sonoran old man cactus (Pilosocereus alensis)
- strawberry hedgehog cactus (Echinocereus fasciculatus)
- tapona (Opuntia tapona)
- teddy bear cholla (Cylindropuntia bigelovii)
- thistle cholla (Cylindropuntia tunicata)
- Thornber's nipple cactus (Cochemiea thornberi)
- tree cholla (Cylindropuntia imbricata)
- triangle cactus (Acanthocereus tetragonus)
- twisted barrel cactus (Ferocactus herrerae)
- tulip prickly pear (Opuntia phaeacantha)
- tuna cactus (Opuntia ficus-indica)
- twistspine prickly pear (Opuntia macrorhiza)
- violet prickly pear (Opuntia gosseliniana)
- walkingstick cactus (Cylindropuntia spinosior)
- Whipple cholla (Cylindropuntia whipplei)
- Whipple's fishhook cactus (Sclerocactus whipplei)
- white fishhook cactus (Echinomastus intertextus)
- Wolf's opuntia (Cylindropuntia wolfii)
- Wright's nipple cactus (Cochemiea wrightii)

=== Campanulaceae ===
- Apache lobelia (Lobelia anatina)
- cardinalflower (Lobelia cardinalis)
- clasping Venus' looking-glass (Triodanis perfoliata)
- devil's tobacco (Lobelia tupa)
- fringeleaf lobelia (Lobelia fenestralis)
- madamfate (Hippobroma longiflora)
- Sierra Madre lobelia (Lobelia laxiflora)

=== Cannabaceae ===
- guasique (Aphananthe monoica)
- marijuana (Cannabis sativa)
- sugarberry (Celtis laevigata)

=== Capparaceae ===
- falseteeth (Capparis flexuosa)
- vomitbush (Capparis atamisquea)

=== Caprifoliaceae ===
- Arizona honeysuckle (Lonicera arizonica)
- Mexican honeysuckle (Lonicera pilosa)
- Palmer's snowberry (Symphoricarpos palmeri)
- pineland valerian (Valeriana sorbifolia)
- tobacco root (Valeriana edulis)
- western white honeysuckle (Lonicera albiflora)

=== Caricaceae ===
- jarilla (Jarilla heterophylla)

=== Caryophyllaceae ===
- canyon drymary (Drymaria leptophylla)
- cardinal catchfly (Silene laciniata)
- Chihuahuan chickweed (Cerastium sordidum)
- common soapwort (Saponaria officinalis)
- Fendler's drymary (Drymaria glandulosa)
- hairy rupturewort (Herniaria hirsuta)
- Indian pink (Silene californica)
- nodding chickweed (Cerastium nutans)
- pinewoods drymary (Drymaria effusa)
- shortstalk chickweed (Cerastium brachypodum)
- simple campion (Silene scouleri)
- sleepy silene (Silene antirrhina)
- slender drymary (Drymaria multiflora)
- slimleaf drymary (Drymaria molluginea)
- spreading pygmyleaf (Loeflingia squarrosa)
- spreading sandwort (Arenaria lanuginosa)
- Texas chickweed (Cerastium texanum)
- Trans-Pecos drymary (Drymaria laxiflora)

=== Celastraceae ===
- algodoncillo (Wimmeria mexicana)
- crucifixion thorn (Canotia holacantha)
- desert yaupon (Schaefferia cuneifolia)
- Florida mayten (Maytenus phyllanthoides)
- sandpaper bush (Mortonia sempervirens)

=== Cistaceae ===
- clustered frostweed (Helianthemum glomeratum)
- threepetal pinweed (Lechea tripetala)

=== Cleomaceae ===
- Asian spiderflower (Cleome viscosa)
- bladderpod spiderflower (Cleomella arborea)
- sandyseed clammyweed (Cleome trachysperma)
- spectacle fruit (Cleomella refracta)
- spiderwisp (Cleome gynandra)

=== Combretaceae ===
- button mangrove (Conocarpus erectus)
- white mangrove (Laguncularia racemosa)

=== Commelinaceae ===
- blue spiderwort (Commelina coelestis)
- birdbill dayflower (Commelina dianthifolia)
- climbing dayflower (Commelina diffusa)
- cojite morado (Callisia monandra)
- creeping inchplant (Callisia repens)
- leatherleaf spiderwort (Tradescantia crassifolia)
- pinewoods spiderwort (Tradescantia pinetorum)
- whitemouth dayflower (Commelina erecta)

=== Convolvulaceae ===
- American dodder (Cuscuta americana)
- bayhops (Ipomoea pes-caprae)
- beach morning glory (Ipomoea imperati)
- bejuco blanco (Ipomoea bracteata)
- bigseed alfalfa dodder (Cuscuta indecora)
- Cairo morning glory (Ipomoea cairica)
- canyon morning glory (Ipomoea barbatisepala)
- cardinal climber (Ipomoea quamoclit)
- Cochise dodder (Cuscuta mitriformis)
- crestrib morning glory (Ipomoea costellata)
- field bindweed (Convolvulus arvensis)
- fiveangled dodder (Cuscuta pentagona)
- flatglobe dodder (Cuscuta umbellata)
- Gila River dodder (Cuscuta applanata)
- globe dodder (Cuscuta potosina)
- gloria de la mañana (Ipomoea carnea)
- heartleaf morning glory (Ipomoea cardiophylla)
- Huachuca Mountain morning glory (Ipomoea plummerae)
- ivyleaf morning glory (Ipomoea hederacea)
- lilacbell (Ipomoea turbinata)
- Meyer's morning glory (Ipomoea meyeri)
- midnightblue clustervine (Jacquemontia agrestis)
- New Mexico ponysfoot (Dichondra brachypoda)
- noyau vine (Merremia dissecta)
- oceanblue morning glory (Ipomoea indica)
- pinkthroat morning glory (Ipomoea longifolia)
- Pringle's clustervine (Jacquemontia pringlei)
- purple morning glory (Ipomoea capillacea)
- rock rosemary (Merremia quinquefolia)
- romerilla de la sierra (Ipomoea ancisa)
- shaggy dwarf morning glory (Evolvulus nuttallianus)
- silky morning glory (Ipomoea pubescens)
- silver dwarf morning glory (Evolvulus sericeus)
- silverleaf ponysfoot (Dichondra sericea)
- skyblue clustervine (Jacquemontia pentanthos)
- slender dodder (Cuscuta leptantha)
- slender dwarf morning glory (Evolvulus alsinoides)
- Sonoran dodder (Cuscuta erosa)
- spiderleaf (Ipomoea tenuiloba)
- spreading alkaliweed (Cressa truxillensis)
- sweet potato (Ipomoea batatas)
- tall morning glory (Ipomoea purpurea)
- tansyleaf lidpod (Operculina pinnatifida)
- Thurber's morning glory (Ipomoea thurberi)
- Trans-Pecos morning glory (Ipomoea cristulata)
- tree morning glory (Ipomoea arborescens)
- tripleleaf morning glory (Ipomoea ternifolia)
- tubercle dodder (Cuscuta tuberculata)
- white-edge morning glory (Ipomoea nil)
- wild dwarf morning glory (Evolvulus arizonicus)
- Wright's morning glory (Ipomoea wrightii)
- yellow morning glory vine (Merremia aurea)

=== Cornaceae ===
- mata hombre (Cornus disciflora)
- redosier dogwood (Cornus sericea)

=== Crassulaceae ===
- Abrams' liveforever (Dudleya abramsii)
- Anthony's liveforever (Dudleya anthonyi)
- Blochman's liveforever (Dudleya blochmaniae)
- bright green dudleya (Dudleya virens)
- Britton's liveforever (Dudleya brittonii)
- broadleaf stonecrop (Sedum spathulifolium)
- canyon liveforever (Dudleya cymosa)
- chalk dudleya (Dudleya pulverulenta)
- Chihuahua flower (Graptopetalum bellum)
- cliff lettuce (Dudleya farinosa)
- Cockerell's stonecrop (Sedum cockerellii)
- fingertips (Dudleya edulis)
- Gila County liveforever (Dudleya collomiae)
- Huachuca Mountain stonecrop (Sedum stelliforme)
- lanceleaf liveforever (Dudleya lanceolata)
- manystem liveforever (Dudleya multicaulis)
- Panamint liveforever (Dudleya saxosa)
- Patagonia Mountain leatherpetal (Graptopetalum bartramii)
- pricklyseed pygmyweed (Crassula viridis)
- sand pygmyweed (Crassula connata)
- San Francisco River leatherpetal (Graptopetalum rusbyi)
- Santa Cruz Island liveforever (Dudleya nesiotica)
- smoothseed pygmyweed (Crassula solieri)
- sticky liveforever (Dudleya viscida)
- tapertip liveforever (Dudleya attenuata)
- variegated liveforever (Dudleya variegata)
- wrinkleseed pygmyweed (Crassula saginoides)

=== Crossosomataceae ===
- apachebush (Apacheria chiricahuensis)
- California rockflower (Crossosoma californicum)
- ragged rockflower (Crossosoma bigelovii)

=== Cucurbitaceae ===
- abenallilla (Ibervillea fusiformis)
- balsampear (Momordica charantia)
- calabash (Lagenaria siceraria)
- melon (Cucumis melo)
- climbing arrowheads (Sicyosperma gracile)
- colocynth (Citrullus colocynthis)
- coralfruit (Doyerea emetocathartica)
- coyote gourd (Cucurbita cordata)
- coyote melon (Cucurbita palmata)
- Cucamonga manroot (Marah macrocarpa)
- cucumber (Cucumis sativus)
- cushaw (Cucurbita argyrosperma)
- desert starvine (Brandegea bigelovii)
- estropajillo (Schizocarpum palmeri)
- figleaf gourd (Cucurbita ficifolia)
- fingerleaf gourd (Cucurbita digitata)
- Gila manroot (Marah gilensis)
- Guadeloupe cucumber (Melothria pendula)
- melon loco (Apodanthera undulata)
- Missouri gourd (Cucurbita foetidissima)
- slimlobe globeberry (Ibervillea tenuisecta)
- small-flower burr-cucumber (Sicyos parviflorus)
- small-leaf burr-cucumber (Sicyos microphyllus)
- sponge cucumber (Luffa operculata)
- sponge gourd (Luffa aegyptiaca)
- squash (Cucurbita maxima)
- squash (Cucurbita moschata)
- squash (Cucurbita pepo)
- streamside burr-cucumber (Sicyos laciniatus)
- Tumamoc globeberry (Tumamoca macdougalii)
- watermelon (Citrullus lanatus)
- West Indian gherkin (Cucumis anguria)
- wild balsam apple (Echinopepon wrightii)

=== Cupressaceae ===
- alligator juniper (Juniperus deppeana)
- Arizona cypress (Cupressus arizonica)
- California juniper (Juniperus californica)
- Monterey cypress (Cupressus macrocarpa)
- redberry juniper (Juniperus coahuilensis)
- Rocky Mountain juniper (Juniperus scopulorum)
- táscate espinosa (Juniperus durangensis)
- Tecate cypress (Cupressus forbesii)
- Utah juniper (Juniperus osteosperma)

=== Cyperaceae ===
- alkali bulrush (Bolboschoenus maritimus)
- bearded flatsedge (Cyperus squarrosus)
- black flatsedge (Cyperus niger)
- Canada spikesedge (Eleocharis geniculata)
- chairmaker's bulrush (Schoenoplectus americanus)
- Chihuahuan sedge (Carex chihuahuensis)
- clustered field sedge (Carex praegracilis)
- common spikerush (Eleocharis palustris)
- epiphytic flatsedge (Cyperus lanceolatus)
- Fendler's flatsedge (Cyperus fendlerianus)
- finger flatsedge (Cyperus digitatus)
- foothill flatsedge (Cyperus amabilis)
- forked fimbry (Fimbristylis dichotoma)
- fragrant flatsedge (Cyperus odoratus)
- Funck's hairsedge (Bulbostylis funckii)
- grassleaf sedge (Carex agrostoides)
- green flatsedge (Cyperus virens)
- hairy flatsedge (Cyperus dentoniae)
- hardstem bulrush (Schoenoplectus acutus)
- hermaphrodite flatsedge (Cyperus hermaphroditus)
- Huachuca Mountain sedge (Carex leucodonta)
- inflatedscale flatsedge (Cyperus aggregatus)
- Kunth's beaksedge (Rhynchospora kunthii)
- manyspike flatsedge (Cyperus polystachyos)
- mosquito flatsedge (Cyperus prolixus)
- mountain spikerush (Eleocharis montana)
- Mutis' flatsedge (Cyperus mutisii)
- Nebraska sedge (Carex nebrascensis)
- netted nutrush (Scleria reticularis)
- nutgrass (Cyperus rotundus)
- oneflower flatsedge (Cyperus retroflexus)
- pallid flatsedge (Cyperus pallidicolor)
- Parish's spikerush (Eleocharis parishii)
- pine flatsedge (Cyperus hypopitys)
- pond flatsedge (Cyperus ochraceus)
- poorland flatsedge (Cyperus compressus)
- purple spikerush (Eleocharis atropurpurea)
- ricefield flatsedge (Cyperus iria)
- riverswamp nutrush (Scleria hirtella)
- rooted spikerush (Eleocharis radicans)
- royal flatsedge (Cyperus elegans)
- Rusby's flatsedge (Cyperus sphaerolepis)
- rush hairsedge (Bulbostylis juncoides)
- sand spikerush (Eleocharis montevidensis)
- seacoast bulrush (Bolboschoenus robustus)
- sharpscale flatsedge (Cyperus oxylepis)
- slender flatsedge (Cyperus bipartitus)
- smallflower halfchaff sedge (Lipocarpha micrantha)
- smooth flatsedge (Cyperus laevigatus)
- southern fimbry (Fimbristylis decipiens)
- spectacular flatsedge (Cyperus spectabilis)
- starrush whitetop (Rhynchospora colorata)
- swamp carex (Carex senta)
- taperfruit shortscale sedge (Carex leptopoda)
- tapertip flatsedge (Cyperus acuminatus)
- Texas flatsedge (Cyperus seslerioides)
- tropical flatsedge (Cyperus surinamensis)
- turban sedge (Carex turbinata)
- umbrella plant (Cyperus involucratus)
- variable flatsedge (Cyperus difformis)
- white-edge flatsedge (Cyperus flavicomus)
- whitehead sedge (Kyllinga odorata)
- widefruit sedge (Carex angustata)
- withering flatsedge (Cyperus fugax)
- woodrush flatsedge (Cyperus entrerianus)
- Wright's flatsedge (Carex dipsaceus)
- yellow flatsedge (Cyperus flavescens)
- yerba de estrella (Rhynchospora nervosa)

=== Dennstaedtiaceae ===
- tropical hayscented fern (Dennstaedtia cicutaria)
- western bracken fern (Pteridium aquilinum)

=== Dioscoreaceae ===
- barbasquillo (Dioscorea convolvulacea)

=== Dryopteridaceae ===
- Christmas fern (Polystichum acrostichoides)
- cinnamon woodfern (Dryopteris cinnamomea)
- eared veinfern (Phanerophlebia auriculata)

=== Ebenaceae ===
- Sonoran persimmon (Diospyros sonorae)
- wild persimmon (Diospyros californica)

=== Elatinaceae ===
- Texas bergia (Bergia texana)

=== Ephedraceae ===
- longleaf jointfir (Ephedra trifurca)
- Nevada jointfir (Ephedra nevadensis)
- rough jointfir (Ephedra aspera)

=== Equisetaceae ===
- dwarf scouringrush (Equisetum scirpoides)
- smooth horsetail (Equisetum laevigatum)

=== Ericaceae ===
- Arizona madrone (Arbutus arizonica)
- Baja birdbush (Ornithostaphylos oppositifolia)
- dwarf bilberry (Vaccinium caespitosum)
- ghost plant (Monotropa uniflora)
- peninsular manzanita (Arctostaphylos peninsularis)
- pinesap (Monotropa hypopitys)
- pointleaf manzanita (Arctostaphylos pungens)
- sidebells wintergreen (Orthilia secunda)
- striped prince's pine (Chimaphila maculata)
- Texas madrone (Arbutus xalapensis)

=== Erythroxylaceae ===
- redheart (Erythroxylum mexicanum)

=== Euphorbiaceae ===
- Abrams' sandmat (Euphorbia abramsiana)
- Arizona manihot (Manihot davisiae)
- Arizona nettlespurge (Jatropha cinerea)
- Arizona sandmat (Euphorbia arizonica)
- arrow poison plant (Sebastiania bilocularis)
- beetle spurge (Euphorbia eriantha)
- blackseed spurge (Euphorbia bilobata)
- branched noseburn (Tragia ramosa)
- buckeye-leafed cassava (Manihot aesculifolia)
- California copperleaf (Acalypha californica)
- candelilla (Euphorbia ceroderma)
- Carrizo Mountain sandmat (Euphorbia pediculifera)
- castor bean (Ricinus communis)
- catnip noseburn (Tragia nepetifolia)
- Chiricahua Mountain sandmat (Euphorbia florida)
- cliff spurge (Euphorbia misera)
- David's spurge (Euphorbia davidii)
- desertmountain manihot (Manihot angustiloba)
- desert silverbush (Argythamnia claryana)
- eyebane (Euphorbia nutans)
- fire on the mountain (Euphorbia cyathophora)
- foxtail copperleaf (Acalypha alopecuroides)
- graceful sandmat (Euphorbia hypericifolia)
- grassleaf sandmat (Euphorbia graminea)
- gulf sandmat (Euphorbia thymifolia)
- hairyfruit spurge (Euphorbia cuphosperma)
- head sandmat (Euphorbia capitellata)
- hoary myrtlecroton (Bernardia incana)
- horned spurge (Euphorbia brachycera)
- Huachuca Mountain spurge (Euphorbia macropus)
- hyssopleaf sandmat (Euphorbia hyssopifolia)
- Jones' noseburn (Tragia jonesii)
- leatherweed (Croton pottsii)
- mala mujer (Cnidoscolus angustidens)
- matted sandmat (Euphorbia serpens)
- Mendez's sandmat (Euphorbia mendezii)
- Mexican copperleaf (Acalypha mexicana)
- Mexican croton (Croton ciliatoglandulifer)
- Mexican fireplant (Euphorbia heterophylla)
- Mexican jumping bean (Sebastiania pavoniana)
- Mexican sandmat (Euphorbia gracillima)
- milk purslane (Euphorbia maculata)
- mountain spurge (Euphorbia chamaesula)
- narrowleaf silverbush (Argythamnia lanceolata)
- New Mexico copperleaf (Acalypha neomexicana)
- New Mexico silverbush (Argythamnia neomexicana)
- Parry's sandmat (Euphorbia parryi)
- petty spurge (Euphorbia peplus)
- physicnut (Jatropha cuneata)
- pillpod sandmat (Euphorbia hirta)
- pineland threeseed mercury (Acalypha ostryifolia)
- prostrate sandmat (Euphorbia prostrata)
- queen's-root (Stillingia linearifolia)
- ragged nettlespurge (Jatropha macrorhiza)
- red-gland spurge (Euphorbia melanadenia)
- ribseed sandmat (Euphorbia glyptosperma)
- royal sandmat (Euphorbia indivisa)
- sangre de cristo (Jatropha cardiophylla)
- San Pedro River sandmat (Euphorbia trachysperma)
- sawtooth sandmat (Euphorbia serrula)
- slimseed sandmat (Euphorbia stictospora)
- slipper flower (Pedilanthus macrocarpus)
- smallseed sandmat (Euphorbia polycarpa)
- snow on the mountain (Euphorbia marginata)
- squareseed spurge (Euphorbia exstipulata)
- Sonoita noseburn (Tragia laciniata)
- Sonoran croton (Croton sonorae)
- Sonoran sandmat (Euphorbia micromera)
- southern Florida sandmat (Euphorbia adenoptera)
- spurgecreeper (Dalechampia scandens)
- sun spurge (Euphorbia radians)
- sycamore-leafed limberbush (Jatropha malacophylla)
- threadstem sandmat (Euphorbia revoluta)
- whitemargin sandmat (Euphorbia albomarginata)
- Yuma sandmat (Euphorbia setiloba)
- Yuma silverbush (Argythamnia serrata)

=== Fabaceae ===
- American sicklepod (Senna obtusifolia)
- anil de pasto (Indigofera suffruticosa)
- anil falso (Coursetia caribaea)
- Arizona lupine (Lupinus arizonicus)
- Arizona milkvetch (Astragalus arizonicus)
- Arizona necklacepod (Sophora arizonica)
- Arizona ticktrefoil (Desmodium arizonicum)
- arrowhead rattlebox (Crotalaria sagittalis)
- arroyo lupine (Lupinus succulentus)
- Asian indigo (Indigofera trita)
- Atlantic pigeonwings (Clitoria mariana)
- Aztec clover (Trifolium amabile)
- bajada lupine (Lupinus concinnus)
- Baja fairyduster (Calliandra californica)
- barba de chivato (Calliandra houstoniana)
- bayahonda blanca (Prosopis juliflora)
- bigpod sesbania (Sesbania herbacea)
- bird of paradise shrub (Caesalpinia gilliesii)
- black locust (Robinia pseudoacacia)
- blue paloverde (Parkinsonia florida)
- boat-spine acacia (Acacia cochliacantha)
- brasilette (Haematoxylum brasiletto)
- Brazilian jackbean (Canavalia brasiliensis)
- Brazilian stylo (Stylosanthes guianensis)
- broadleaf lupine (Lupinus parishii)
- burclover (Medicago polymorpha)
- California dalea (Psorothamnus arborescens)
- carabatilla de espina negra (Senegalia kelloggiana)
- cassie (Vachellia farnesiana)
- catclaw acacia (Senegalia greggii)
- catclaw blackbead (Pithecellobium unguis-cati)
- catclaw mimosa (Mimosa aculeaticarpa)
- chacapo (Mimosa polyantha)
- chaparral pea (Pickeringia montana)
- Chihuahuan prairie clover (Dalea exigua)
- Chihuahuan snoutbean (Rhynchosia edulis)
- chipilín (Crotalaria longirostrata)
- coastal bird's-foot trefoil (Lotus salsuginosus)
- coralbean (Erythrina flabelliformis)
- corcho (Diphysa suberosa)
- Coues' cassia (Senna covesii)
- Coville's bundleflower (Desmanthus covillei)
- cow clover (Trifolium wormskioldii)
- dead and awake (Neptunia plena)
- deerweed (Syrmatium glabrum)
- desert false indigo (Amorpha fruticosa)
- desert ironwood (Olneya tesota)
- desert lupine (Lupinus sparsiflorus)
- desertsenna (Senna armata)
- dixie ticktrefoil (Desmodium tortuosum)
- dwarf prairie clover (Dalea nana)
- dwarf stickpea (Calliandra humilis)
- dwarf white milkvetch (Astragalus didymocarpus)
- dyebush (Psorothamnus emoryi)
- ébano (Caesalpinia sclerocarpa)
- elegant lupine (Lupinus elegans)
- fairyduster (Calliandra eriophylla)
- feather acacia (Acacia pennatula)
- featherplume (Dalea formosa)
- fish poison tree (Piscidia mollis)
- flor de San José (Senna atomaria)
- foothill deervetch (Lotus humistratus)
- foxtail prairie clover (Dalea leporina)
- freckled milkvetch (Astragalus lentiginosus)
- Frémont's dalea (Psorothamnus fremontii)
- frijolillo (Acacia goldmanii)
- Gentry's indigobush (Dalea tentaculoides)
- giant sensitive plant (Mimosa diplotricha)
- Graham's mimosa (Mimosa grahamii)
- Graham's ticktrefoil (Desmodium grahamii)
- grape soda lupine (Lupinus excubitus)
- grassleaf pea (Lathyrus graminifolius)
- Gray's prairie clover (Dalea grayi)
- green cassia (Cassia nemophila)
- Greene's bird's-foot trefoil (Lotus greenei)
- greenleaf ticktrefoil (Desmodium intortum)
- Gregg's prairie clover (Dalea greggii)
- guayabillo (Mariosousa russelliana)
- Gulf Indian breadroot (Pediomelum rhombifolium)
- gulo (Havardia sonorae)
- haba de barranca (Brongniartia nudiflora)
- hairy jointvetch (Aeschynomene villosa)
- hairypod cowpea (Vigna luteola)
- hairy prairie clover (Dalea mollis)
- halfmoon milkvetch (Astragalus allochrous)
- Hill's lupine (Lupinus hillii)
- honeylocust (Gleditsia triacanthos)
- honey mesquite (Prosopis glandulosa)
- hourglass peaseed (Sphinctospermum constrictum)
- Huachuca Mountain lupine (Lupinus huachucanus)
- Huachuca Mountain milkvetch (Astragalus hypoxylus)
- huiloche (Diphysa occidentalis)
- Indian rushpea (Hoffmannseggia glauca)
- Jerusalem thorn (Parkinsonia aculeata)
- least snoutbean (Rhynchosia minima)
- Lemmon's cologania (Cologania obovata)
- Lemmon's lupine (Lupinus lemmonii)
- littleleaf false tamarind (Lysiloma watsonii)
- littleleaf greentwig (Brongniartia minutifolia)
- longleaf cologania (Cologania angustifolia)
- low prairie clover (Dalea scandens)
- low rattlebox (Crotalaria pumila)
- Lumholtz's prairie clover (Dalea lumholtzii)
- Mexican ebony (Havardia mexicana)
- Mexican holdback (Caesalpinia mexicana)
- Mexican kidneywood (Eysenhardtia polystachya)
- Mexican mimosa (Mimosa distachya)
- Mexican pea tree (Brongniartia alamosana)
- Mexican prairie clover (Dalea exserta)
- Mexican redbud (Cercis mexicana)
- milfoil wattle (Mariosousa millefolia)
- miniature lupine (Lupinus bicolor)
- Mogollon Mountain vetch (Vicia leucophaea)
- Mojave lupine (Lupinus odoratus)
- monkeypod (Pithecellobium dulce)
- mountain goldenbanner (Thermopsis montana)
- nacascolo (Chloroleucon mangense)
- narrowleaf ticktrefoil (Desmodium angustifolium)
- New Mexico bird's-foot trefoil (Lotus plebeius)
- New Mexico lupine (Lupinus neomexicanus)
- New Mexico ticktrefoil (Desmodium neomexicanum)
- oakwoods prairie clover (Dalea versicolor)
- oneleaf senna (Senna uniflora)
- pojo de venado (Canavalia villosa)
- Pacific pea (Lathyrus vestitus)
- pale cologania (Cologania pallida)
- palo blanco (Lysiloma candidum)
- palo brea (Parkinsonia praecox)
- palo chino (Acacia peninsularis)
- palo Colorado (Caesalpinia platyloba)
- palo estaca (Caesalpinia pannosa)
- palo fierro (Hesperalbizia occidentalis)
- palo joso (Albizia sinaloensis)
- Parry's false prairie-clover (Marina parryi)
- pata de cabra (Bauhinia pringlei)
- Pinos Altos Mountain bean (Phaseolus parvulus)
- poorman's friend (Stylosanthes viscosa)
- prairie acacia (Acacia angustissima)
- pride of Barbados (Caesalpinia pulcherrima)
- pride of California (Lathyrus splendens)
- Pringle's prairie clover (Dalea pringlei)
- Puerto Rico sensitive briar (Mimosa asperata)
- purple bushbean (Macroptilium atropurpureum)
- purple desert lupine (Lupinus shockleyi)
- quebracho (Lysiloma divaricatum)
- quickstick (Gliricidia sepium)
- red fairyduster (Calliandra peninsularis)
- red hoarypea (Tephrosia vicioides)
- rosary babybonnets (Coursetia glandulosa)
- rosary snoutbean (Rhynchosia precatoria)
- Rose's ticktrefoil (Desmodium rosei)
- royal poinciana (Delonix regia)
- San Pedro false prairie-clover (Marina calycosa)
- San Pedro ticktrefoil (Desmodium batocaulon)
- Santa Catalina prairie clover (Dalea pulchra)
- Santa Cruz Island ticktrefoil (Desmodium psilocarpum)
- Santa Rita Mountain ticktrefoil (Desmodium retinens)
- scarlet milkvetch (Astragalus coccineus)
- Schott's dalea (Psorothamnus schottii)
- Schott's yellowhood (Nissolia schottii)
- scorpion ticktrefoil (Desmodium scorpiurus)
- screwbean mesquite (Prosopis pubescens)
- sensitive partridge pea (Chamaecrista nictitans)
- septicweed (Senna occidentalis)
- shakeshake (Crotalaria incana)
- shortstem lupine (Lupinus brevicaulis)
- shrubby deervetch (Lotus rigidus)
- shyleaf (Aeschynomene americana)
- silver prairie clover (Dalea bicolor)
- silver senna (Senna artemisioides)
- silvery lupine (Lupinus argenteus)
- simpleleaf ticktrefoil (Desmodium psilophyllum)
- sixweeks prairie clover (Dalea polygonoides)
- slender sensitive pea (Chamaecrista serpens)
- slimjim bean (Phaseolus filiformis)
- slimleaf bean (Phaseolus angustissimus)
- smoketree (Psorothamnus spinosus)
- smooth babybonnets (Coursetia glabella)
- smoothpod hoarypea (Tephrosia leiocarpa)
- soft prairie clover (Dalea mollissima)
- Sonoran bean (Phaseolus pedicellatus)
- Sonoran bird's-foot trefoil (Lotus alamosanus)
- Sonoran indigo (Indigofera sphaerocarpa)
- Sonoran prairie clover (Dalea filiformis)
- Sonoran ticktrefoil (Desmodium scopulorum)
- sourclover (Melilotus indica)
- spiked ticktrefoil (Desmodium cinerascens)
- spotted bean (Phaseolus maculatus)
- spreading false prairie-clover (Marina diffusa)
- spurred butterfly pea (Centrosema virginianum)
- strigose bird's-foot trefoil (Lotus strigosus)
- sweetclover vetch (Vicia pulchella)
- sweet pea (Lathyrus odoratus)
- tailcup lupine (Lupinus caudatus)
- tamarind (Tamarindus indica)
- tepary bean (Phaseolus acutifolius)
- Texas snoutbean (Rhynchosia senna)
- Thurber's diphysa (Diphysa thurberi)
- Thurber's hoarypea (Tephrosia thurberi)
- Townsville stylo (Stylosanthes humilis)
- tree catclaw (Acacia occidentalis)
- tropical ticktrefoil (Desmodium cajanifolium)
- turkeypeas (Astragalus nuttallianus)
- twinleaf senna (Senna bauhinioides)
- twohorn bundleflower (Desmanthus bicornutus)
- vainilla (Clitoria polystachya)
- variableleaf bushbean (Macroptilium gibbosifolium)
- velvet leaf senna (Senna lindheimeriana)
- velvet mesquite (Neltuma velutina)
- velvetpod mimosa (Mimosa dysocarpa)
- viche (Caesalpinia standleyi)
- viscid acacia (Acacia neovernicosa)
- western redbud (Cercis occidentalis)
- western trailing ticktrefoil (Desmodium procumbens)
- wetapochi (Caesalpinia caladenia)
- whitebark acacia (Mariosousa willardiana)
- whiteflower prairie clover (Dalea albiflora)
- white leadtree (Leucaena leucocephala)
- white prairie clover (Dalea candida)
- wild pea (Vigna adenantha)
- Wislizenus' senna (Senna wislizeni)
- woman's tongue (Albizia lebbeck)
- wondering cowpea (Vigna speciosa)
- woods clover (Trifolium pinetorum)
- woolly locoweed (Astragalus mollissimus)
- woolly senna (Senna hirsuta)
- Wright's milkpea (Galactia wrightii)
- Wright's prairie clover (Dalea wrightii)
- yellow paloverde (Parkinsonia microphylla)
- yellow sweetclover (Melilotus albus)
- yoke-leaved amicia (Amicia zygomeris)
- zarzabacoa de dos hojas (Zornia reticulata)

=== Fagaceae ===
- black oak (Quercus devia)
- Brandegee oak (Quercus brandegeei)
- California live oak (Quercus agrifolia)
- canyon live oak (Quercus chrysolepis)
- Chihuahua oak (Quercus chihuahuensis)
- cusi (Quercus albocincta)
- Davis Mountain oak (Quercus depressipes)
- Emory oak (Quercus emoryi)
- encino asta (Quercus subspathulata)
- gray oak (Quercus grisea)
- handbasin oak (Quercus tarahumara)
- Mexican blue oak (Quercus oblongifolia)
- netleaf oak (Quercus rugosa)
- Palmer oak (Quercus palmeri)
- pungent oak (Quercus pungens)
- roble prieto (Quercus durifolia)
- scrub oak (Quercus dumosa)
- silverleaf oak (Quercus hypoleucoides)
- Sonoran oak (Quercus viminea)
- Sonoran scrub oak (Quercus turbinella)
- Toumey oak (Quercus toumeyi)
- valley oak (Quercus lobata)

=== Fouquieriaceae ===
- Adam's tree (Fouquieria diguetii)
- boojum (Fouquieria columnaris)
- Mexican tree ocotillo (Fouquieria macdougalii)
- ocotillo (Fouquieria splendens)
- pichilingue (Fouquieria burragei)
- tropical ocotillo (Fouquieria fasciculata)

=== Frankeniaceae ===
- alkali heath (Frankenia salina)
- Palmer's seaheath (Frankenia palmeri)

=== Garryaceae ===
- ashy silktassel (Garrya flavescens)
- eggleaf silktassel (Garrya ovata)
- laurelleaf silktassel (Garrya laurifolia)
- Wright's silktassel (Garrya wrightii)

=== Gelsemiaceae ===
- Carolina jessamine (Gelsemium sempervirens)

=== Gentianaceae ===
- Arizona centaury (Zeltnera calycosa)
- autumn dwarf gentian (Gentianella amarella)
- Chiricahua dwarf gentian (Gentianella microcalyx)
- Chiricahua Mountain dwarf gentian (Gentianella wislizeni)
- desert centaury (Zeltnera exaltata)
- elkweed (Frasera speciosa)
- grand fringed gentian (Gentianopsis macrantha)
- Mt. Graham spurred gentian (Halenia recurva)
- Santa Catalina Mountain centaury (Zeltnera nudicaulis)

=== Geraniaceae ===
- Huachuca Mountain geranium (Geranium wislizeni)
- Richardson's geranium (Geranium richardsonii)
- Texas stork's bill (Erodium texanum)

=== Grossulariaceae ===
- chaparral currant (Ribes indecorum)
- fuchsia-flowered currant (Ribes speciosum)
- island currant (Ribes viburnifolium)
- orange gooseberry (Ribes pinetorum)

=== Haloragaceae ===
- cutleaf watermilfoil (Myriophyllum pinnatum)
- Eurasian watermilfoil (Myriophyllum spicatum)
- parrot feather watermilfoil (Myriophyllum aquaticum)

=== Hydrangeaceae ===
- cliff fendlerbush (Fendlera rupicola)
- climbing hydrangea (Hydrangea seemannii)
- Lewis' mock orange (Philadelphus lewisii)
- littleleaf mock orange (Philadelphus microphyllus)

=== Hydrocharitaceae ===
- hydrilla (Hydrilla verticillata)
- nodding waternymph (Najas flexilis)

=== Hydroleaceae ===
- spiny false fiddleleaf (Hydrolea spinosa)

=== Hypericaceae ===
- Scouler's St. John's wort (Hypericum scouleri)

=== Hypoxidaceae ===
- Mexican yellow star-grass (Hypoxis mexicana)

=== Iridaceae ===
- Arizona blue-eyed grass (Sisyrinchium arizonicum)
- blackberry lily (Iris domestica)
- false freesia (Freesia laxa)
- fragrant gladiolus (Gladiolus murielae)
- montbretia (Crocosmia crocosmiiflora)
- nodding blue-eyed grass (Sisyrinchium cernuum)
- North's false flag (Trimezia northiana)
- Rocky Mountain iris (Iris missouriensis)
- stiff blue-eyed grass (Sisyrinchium demissum)
- tiger flower (Tigridia pavonia)
- western blue-eyed grass (Sisyrinchium bellum)
- yellow walking iris (Trimezia longifolia)

=== Juglandaceae ===
- Arizona walnut (Juglans major)

=== Juncaceae ===
- arctic rush (Juncus arcticus)
- Colorado rush (Juncus confusus)
- forked rush (Juncus dichotomus)
- grassleaf rush (Juncus marginatus)
- jointleaf rush (Juncus articulatus)
- poverty rush (Juncus tenuis)
- swordleaf rush (Juncus ensifolius)
- tapertip rush (Juncus acuminatus)

=== Juncaginaceae ===
- Triglochin scilloides (syn. Lilaea scilloides)

=== Krameriaceae ===
- littleleaf ratany (Krameria erecta)
- trailing ratany (Krameria lanceolata)
- white ratany (Krameria bicolor)

=== Lamiaceae ===
- American pennyroyal (Hedeoma pulegioides)
- apple mint (Mentha suaveolens)
- Arizona bluecurls (Trichostema arizonicum)
- Arizona monardella (Monardella arizonica)
- autumn sage (Salvia greggii)
- baby sage (Salvia microphylla)
- basil (Ocimum basilicum)
- bastard lavender (Lavandula × intermedia)
- black sage (Salvia mellifera)
- blood sage (Salvia coccinea)
- blue sage (Salvia pachyphylla)
- bog sage (Salvia uliginosa)
- Browne's savory (Clinopodium brownei)
- Canary Island lavender (Lavandula canariensis)
- Cedros Island sage (Salvia cedrosensis)
- chia (Salvia hispanica)
- Christmas candlestick (Leonotis nepetifolia)
- Cleveland sage (Salvia clevelandii)
- common horehound (Marrubium vulgare)
- common sage (Salvia officinalis)
- Coulter's wrinklefruit (Tetraclea coulteri)
- creeping sage (Salvia sonomensis)
- crimson sage (Salvia henryi)
- Davidson's sage (Salvia davidsonii)
- dentate falsepennyroyal (Hedeoma dentatum)
- desert germander (Teucrium glandulosum)
- desert indigo sage (Salvia arizonica)
- desert lavender (Hyptis emoryi)
- downy lavender (Lavandula multifida)
- English lavender (Lavandula angustifolia)
- European pennyroyal (Mentha pulegium)
- fern lavender (Lavandula pinnata)
- Florida Keys sage (Salvia riparia)
- forsythia sage (Salvia madrensis)
- gentian sage (Salvia patens)
- grape-scented sage (Salvia melissodora)
- henbit deadnettle (Lamium amplexicaule)
- hummingbird sage (Salvia spathacea)
- island pitcher sage (Lepechinia fragrans)
- Jerusalem sage (Phlomis fruticosa)
- lanceleaf sage (Salvia reflexa)
- Lemmon's sage (Salvia microphylla, syn. Salvia lemmonii)
- lemon beebalm (Monarda citriodora)
- lindenleaf sage (Salvia tiliifolia)
- lucha (Salvia alamosana)
- mealy sage (Salvia farinacea)
- Mexican bladdersage (Salazaria mexicana)
- Mexican blue sage (Salvia chamaedryoides)
- Mexican bush sage (Salvia leucantha)
- Mexican sage (Salvia mexicana)
- Mexican scarlet sage (Salvia fulgens)
- Mexican skullcap (Scutellaria potosina)
- Mojave sage (Salvia mohavensis)
- mountain monardella (Monardella odoratissima)
- mouse's ear (Stachys crenata)
- Munz's sage (Salvia munzii)
- negrito (Vitex pyramidata)
- obedient plant (Physostegia virginiana)
- pale giant hyssop (Agastache pallida)
- pignut (Hyptis suaveolens)
- pineapple sage (Salvia elegans)
- pony beebalm (Monarda pectinata)
- Pringle's giant hyssop (Agastache pringlei)
- purple sage (Salvia dorrii)
- ribbed false pennyroyal (Hedeoma costata)
- rock hedgenettle (Stachys bigelovii)
- rock sage (Salvia pinguifolia)
- rosemary (Rosmarinus officinalis)
- San Diego pitcher sage (Lepechinia ganderi)
- San Luis Mountain giant hyssop (Agastache mearnsii)
- San Luis purple sage (Salvia leucophylla)
- scarlet hedgenettle (Stachys coccinea)
- scarlet sage (Salvia splendens)
- shellflower (Moluccella laevis)
- simpleleaf chastetree (Vitex trifolia)
- small coastal germander (Teucrium cubense)
- Sonoran giant hyssop (Agastache wrightii)
- Spanish lavender (Lavandula stoechas)
- spearmint (Mentha spicata)
- thistle sage (Salvia carduacea)
- tropical bushmint (Hyptis mutabilis)
- uvalama (Vitex mollis)
- wall germander (Teucrium chamaedrys)
- white giant hyssop (Agastache micrantha)
- white sage (Salvia apiana)
- wild bergamot (Monarda fistulosa)
- wild mint (Mentha arvensis)
- woolly bluecurls (Trichostema lanatum)
- yellow lavender (Lavandula viridis)

=== Lauraceae ===
- California laurel (Umbellularia californica)
- haya (Cinnamomum hartmannii)
- Mexican bay (Litsea glaucescens)
- shinglewood (Nectandra hihua)

=== Lentibulariaceae ===
- humped bladderwort (Utricularia gibba)

=== Liliaceae ===
- desert Mariposa lily (Calochortus kennedyi)
- doubting Mariposa lily (Calochortus ambiguus)
- golden Mariposa lily (Calochortus aureus)
- lemon lily (Lilium parryi)
- sego lily (Calochortus nuttallii)

=== Linaceae ===
- blue flax (Linum perenne)
- common flax (Linum usitatissimum)
- New Mexico yellow flax (Linum neomexicanum)
- plains flax (Linum puberulum)
- red flax (Linum grandiflorum)
- southern flax (Linum australe)

=== Loasaceae ===
- Adonis blazingstar (Mentzelia multiflora)
- Argus blazingstar (Mentzelia oreophila)
- desert stingbush (Eucnide urens)
- dwarf mentzelia (Mentzelia pumila)
- isolated blazingstar (Mentzelia isolata)
- Jones' blazingstar (Mentzelia jonesii)
- narrowleaf sandpaper plant (Petalonyx linearis)
- Organ Mountain blazingstar (Mentzelia asperula)
- rock nettle (Eucnide rupestris)
- shining blazingstar (Mentzelia nitens)
- Texas blazingstar (Mentzelia texana)
- tropical blazingstar (Mentzelia aspera)
- whitebract blazingstar (Mentzelia involucrata)
- whitestem blazingstar (Mentzelia albicaulis)
- yellowcomet (Mentzelia affinis)

=== Loganiaceae ===
- prairie pinkroot (Spigelia hedyotidea)

=== Lomariopsidaceae ===
- Boston sword fern (Nephrolepis exaltata)

=== Lythraceae ===
- bat-face flower (Cuphea llavea)
- crepe myrtle (Lagerstroemia indica)
- lowland rotala (Rotala ramosior)
- pomegranate (Punica granatum)
- shrubby yellowcrest (Heimia salicifolia)
- stalkflower (Nesaea longipes)
- valley redstem (Ammannia coccinea)
- Wright's waxweed (Cuphea wrightii)

=== Malpighiaceae ===
- acerola (Malpighia emarginata)
- bejuco huesillo (Heteropterys palmeri)
- chaparral asphead (Aspicarpa hirtella)
- hillyhock (Callaeum macropterum)
- narrowleaf goldshower (Galphimia angustifolia)
- slender janusia (Janusia gracilis)
- thryallis (Galphimia glauca)
- wild crepe myrtle (Malpighia glabra)

=== Malvaceae ===
- alkali mallow (Malvella leprosa)
- American basswood (Tilia americana)
- anglestem Indian mallow (Abutilon trisulcatum)
- Arizona anoda (Anoda thurberi)
- Arizona rosemallow (Hibiscus biseptus)
- arrowleaf mallow (Malvella sagittifolia)
- Berlandier's Indian mallow (Abutilon berlandieri)
- bladdermallow (Herissantia crispa)
- bracted fanpetals (Sida ciliaris)
- Brazilian rosemallow (Hibiscus phoeniceus)
- buffpetal (Rhynchosida physocalyx)
- caliche globemallow (Sphaeralcea laxa)
- California ayenia (Ayenia compacta)
- California flannelbush (Fremontodendron californicum)
- chaparral mallow (Malacothamnus fasciculatus)
- cheeseweed (Malva parviflora)
- Chinese hibiscus (Hibiscus rosa-sinensis)
- copper globemallow (Sphaeralcea angustifolia)
- Coulter's globemallow (Sphaeralcea coulteri)
- crested anoda (Anoda cristata)
- crimsoneyed rosemallow (Hibiscus moscheutos)
- Cuban jute (Sida rhombifolia)
- dense ayenia (Ayenia microphylla)
- desert fivespot (Eremalche rotundifolia)
- desert globemallow (Sphaeralcea ambigua)
- dwarf checkermallow (Sidalcea malviflora)
- desert rosemallow (Hibiscus coulteri)
- dwarf Indian mallow (Abutilon parvulum)
- earleaf fanpetals (Sida tragiifolia)
- Emory globemallow (Sphaeralcea emoryi)
- escoba babosa (Bastardia bivalvis)
- field anoda (Anoda pentaschista)
- flaxleaf fanpetals (Sida linifolia)
- fringed rosemallow (Hibiscus schizopetalus)
- grandcousin (Triumfetta lappula)
- heartleaf hibiscus (Hibiscus martianus)
- heartleaf sida (Sida cordifolia)
- Indian anoda (Anoda abutiloides)
- Indian sorrel (Hibiscus sabdariffa)
- koki'o ke'oke'o (Hibiscus arnottianus)
- lanceleaf anoda (Anoda lanceolata)
- netted anoda (Anoda reticulata)
- Newberry's velvetmallow (Horsfordia newberryi)
- New Mexico fanpetals (Sida neomexicana)
- Orinoco jute (Corchorus hirtus)
- paleface (Hibiscus denudatus)
- Palmer's Indian mallow (Abutilon palmeri)
- Parish's Indian mallow (Abutilon parishii)
- pelotazo (Abutilon incanum)
- pink velvetmallow (Horsfordia alata)
- pochote (Ceiba acuminata)
- pricklenut (Guazuma ulmifolia)
- prickly fanpetals (Sida spinosa)
- pyramidflower (Melochia pyramidata)
- Sacramento bur (Triumfetta semitriloba)
- San Marcos hibiscus (Gossypium harknessii)
- Santa Catalina burstwort (Hermannia pauciflora)
- savannah fanpetals (Sida aggregata)
- scurfymallow (Malvella lepidota)
- shaving brush tree (Pseudobombax palmeri)
- shrubby false mallow (Malvastrum bicuspidatum)
- shrubby Indian mallow (Abutilon abutiloides)
- slippery burr (Corchorus siliquosus)
- smooth ayenia (Ayenia glabra)
- smooth fanpetals (Sida glabra)
- Sonoran Indian mallow (Abutilon mollicomum)
- spear globemallow (Sphaeralcea hastulata)
- spreading fanpetals (Sida abutifolia)
- teabush (Melochia tomentosa)
- thicket anoda (Anoda crenatiflora)
- threelobe false mallow (Malvastrum coromandelianum)
- Thurber's cotton (Gossypium thurberi)
- Trans-Pecos ayenia (Ayenia filiformis)
- tree hibiscus (Hibiscus tiliaceus)
- Turk's cap (Malvaviscus penduliflorus)
- uhaloa (Waltheria indica)
- umbrella Indian mallow (Pseudabutilon umbellatum)
- upland cotton (Gossypium hirsutum)
- Davidson's cotton (Gossypium davidsonii)
- viscid mallow (Bastardia viscosa)
- wax mallow (Malvaviscus arboreus)
- white mallow (Eremalche exilis)
- yellowflower Indian mallow (Abutilon reventum)
- yellow Indian mallow (Abutilon malacum)
- yellowstem bushmallow (Malacothamnus densiflorus)

=== Marsileaceae ===
- hairy waterclover (Marsilea vestita)
- tropical waterclover (Marsilea ancylopoda)

=== Martyniaceae ===
- baby devil's claw (Martynia annua)
- desert unicorn-plant (Proboscidea althaeifolia)
- doubleclaw (Proboscidea parviflora)

=== Melanthiaceae ===
- California false hellebore (Veratrum californicum)
- green deathcamas (Zigadenus virescens)

=== Meliaceae ===
- broomstick (Trichilia hirta)
- chinaberry (Melia azedarach)
- koohoo (Trichilia americana)
- Spanish cedar (Cedrela odorata)

=== Menispermaceae ===
- snailseed (Cocculus diversifolius)
- velvetleaf (Cissampelos pareira)

=== Menyanthaceae ===
- floating heart (Nymphoides crenata)

=== Molluginaceae ===
- green carpetweed (Mollugo verticillata)
- spreading sweetjuice (Glinus radiatus)
- threadstem carpetweed (Mollugo cerviana)

=== Montiaceae ===
- common pussypaws (Calyptridium monandrum)
- desert pussypaws (Thingia ambigua)
- fringed redmaids (Calandrinia ciliata)
- orange fameflower (Talinum aurantiacum)
- tepic fameflower (Phemeranthus parvulus)

=== Moraceae ===
- amate (Ficus maxima)
- baiburilla (Dorstenia drakena)
- breadnut (Brosimum alicastrum)
- chalate (Ficus trigonata)
- common fig (Ficus carica)
- fustic (Maclura tinctoria)
- mistletoe fig (Ficus deltoidea)
- nacapul (Ficus cotinifolia)
- rock fig (Ficus petiolaris)
- Sonoran strangler fig (Ficus pertusa)
- Texas mulberry (Morus celtidifolia)
- weeping fig (Ficus benjamina)
- white ramoon (Trophis racemosa)

=== Myrtaceae ===
- arrayán (Psidium sartorianum)
- common guava (Psidium guajava)
- river redgum (Eucalyptus camaldulensis)

=== Nitrariaceae ===
- harmal peganum (Peganum harmala)

=== Nyctaginaceae ===
- Apache Pass spiderling (Boerhavia pterocarpa)
- burrowing four o'clock (Okenia hypogaea)
- climbing wartclub (Boerhavia scandens)
- coastal sand verbena (Abronia maritima)
- Coulter's spiderling (Boerhavia coulteri)
- creeping spiderling (Boerhavia spicata)
- desert wishbone bush (Mirabilis laevis)
- erect spiderling (Boerhavia erecta)
- fivewing spiderling (Boerhavia intermedia)
- fragrant white sand verbena (Abronia elliptica)
- hairy-tuft four o'clock (Mirabilis comata)
- largebract spiderling (Boerhavia wrightii)
- longlobe four o'clock (Mirabilis tenuiloba)
- marvel of Peru (Mirabilis jalapa)
- Mexican devil's-claws (Pisonia capitata)
- pullback (Pisonia aculeata)
- purple spiderling (Boerhavia purpurascens)
- scarlet four o'clock (Mirabilis coccinea)
- scarlet spiderling (Boerhavia coccinea)
- slender spiderling (Boerhavia triquetra)
- slimstalk spiderling (Boerhavia gracillima)
- smooth spreading four o'clock (Mirabilis oxybaphoides)
- sweet four o'clock (Mirabilis longiflora)
- Tucson Mountain spiderling (Boerhavia megaptera)
- white four o'clock (Mirabilis albida)

=== Nymphaeaceae ===
- blue water lily (Nymphaea elegans)
- dotleaf water lily (Nymphaea ampla)
- Mexican water lily (Nymphaea mexicana)
- yellow pond lily (Nuphar lutea)

=== Oleaceae ===
- Arabian jasmine (Jasminum sambac)
- caca ravet (Forestiera rhamnifolia)
- chaparral ash (Fraxinus trifoliolata)
- desert olive (Forestiera shrevei)
- devilwood (Cartrema americana)
- Goodding's ash (Fraxinus gooddingii)
- rough menodora (Menodora scabra)
- spiny menodora (Menodora spinescens)
- stretchberry (Forestiera pubescens)
- velvet ash (Fraxinus velutina)

=== Onagraceae ===
- beach evening primrose (Oenothera drummondii)
- Berlandier's sundrops (Oenothera berlandieri)
- Booth's suncup (Eremothera boothii)
- California evening primrose (Oenothera avita)
- California suncup (Eulobus californicus)
- common evening primrose (Oenothera biennis)
- creeping water primrose (Ludwigia adscendens)
- delicate clarkia (Clarkia delicata)
- diamond clarkia (Clarkia rhomboidea)
- elegant clarkia (Clarkia unguiculata)
- farewell to spring (Clarkia amoena)
- fireweed (Chamaenerion angustifolium)
- fourwing evening primrose (Oenothera tetraptera)
- fringed willowherb (Epilobium ciliatum)
- harlequinbush (Gaura hexandra)
- Hooker's evening primrose (Oenothera elata)
- hummingbird trumpet (Epilobium canum)
- Kunth's evening primrose (Oenothera kunthiana)
- Lindheimer's beeblossom (Oenothera lindheimeri)
- longcapsule suncup (Eremothera chamaenerioides)
- Mexican primrose-willow (Ludwigia octovalvis)
- narrowleaf suncup (Eremothera refracta)
- New Mexico evening primrose (Oenothera neomexicana)
- pinkladies (Oenothera speciosa)
- prairie evening primrose (Oenothera albicaulis)
- rose evening primrose (Oenothera rosea)
- Saltillo evening primrose (Oenothera stubbei)
- scarlet beeblossom (Oenothera suffrutescens)
- shortfruit evening primrose (Oenothera brachycarpa)
- silky evening primrose (Oenothera pubescens)
- Toumey's sundrops (Oenothera toumeyi)
- tufted evening primrose (Oenothera caespitosa)
- velvetweed (Oenothera curtiflora)
- yellow cups (Chylismia brevipes)
- yellow evening primrose (Oenothera flava)

=== Ophioglossaceae ===
- limestone adderstongue (Ophioglossum engelmannii)
- rattlesnake fern (Botrypus virginianus)
- slender adderstongue (Ophioglossum nudicaule)

=== Opiliaceae ===
- margarita (Agonandra racemosa)

=== Orchidaceae ===
- autumn coralroot (Corallorhiza odontorhiza)
- Chiricahua adder's-mouth orchid (Malaxis macrostachya)
- cow's horn orchid (Cyrtopodium punctatum)
- daddy longlegs orchid (Brassavola cucullata)
- flor de los santos (Laelia eyermaniana)
- green ladies' tresses (Spiranthes polyantha)
- hooded coralroot (Corallorhiza striata)
- Huachuca Mountain adder's-mouth orchid (Malaxis corymbosa)
- largeflower crested coralroot (Hexalectris grandiflora)
- leafless beaked lady orchid (Sacoila lanceolata)
- Michaux's orchid (Habenaria quinqueseta)
- pine-pink (Bletia purpurea)
- rattail orchid (Oncidium cebolleta)
- shortflowered bog orchid (Platanthera brevifolia)
- spotted coralroot (Corallorhiza maculata)
- stream orchid (Epipactis gigantea)
- threebirds (Triphora trianthophora)
- Thurber's bog orchid (Platanthera limosa)
- tropical widelip orchid (Liparis vexillifera)

=== Orobanchaceae ===
- alpine cancer-root (Conopholis alpina)
- American cancer-root (Conopholis americana)
- Applegate's Indian paintbrush (Castilleja applegatei)
- Arizona bluehearts (Buchnera obliqua)
- Arizona desert foxglove (Brachystigma wrightii)
- Cooper's broomrape (Orobanche cooperi)
- Eagle Pass blacksenna (Seymeria bipinnatisecta)
- Huachuca Mountain Indian paintbrush (Castilleja patriotica)
- lesser Indian paintbrush (Castilleja minor)
- Mogollon Mountain lousewort (Pedicularis angustifolia)
- najicoli (Lamourouxia viscosa)
- pygmy bluehearts (Buchnera pusilla)
- Rincon Mountain Indian paintbrush (Castilleja austromontana)
- Santa Catalina Indian paintbrush (Castilleja tenuiflora)
- spiked broomrape (Orobanche multicaulis)
- Trans-Pecos Indian paintbrush (Castilleja nervata)

=== Oxalidaceae ===
- alpine woodsorrel (Oxalis alpina)
- broadleaf woodsorrel (Oxalis latifolia)
- creeping woodsorrel (Oxalis corniculata)
- Drummond's woodsorrel (Oxalis drummondii)
- saladita (Oxalis hernandesii)
- tenleaf woodsorrel (Oxalis decaphylla)

=== Papaveraceae ===
- blackspot hornpoppy (Glaucium corniculatum)
- bush poppy (Dendromecon rigida)
- California bearpoppy (Arctomecon californica)
- California poppy (Eschscholzia californica)
- common bearpoppy (Arctomecon humilis)
- corn poppy (Papaver rhoeas)
- Coulter's Matilija poppy (Romneya coulteri)
- creamcups (Platystemon californicus)
- crested pricklypoppy (Argemone polyanthemos)
- curvepod fumewort (Corydalis curvisiliqua)
- desert poppy (Eschscholzia glyptosperma)
- drug fumitory (Fumaria officinalis)
- fineleaf fumitory (Fumaria parviflora)
- fire poppy (Papaver californicum)
- flatbud pricklypoppy (Argemone munita)
- golden eardrops (Dicentra chrysantha)
- Mexican pricklypoppy (Argemone mexicana)
- Mojave pricklypoppy (Argemone corymbosa)
- opium poppy (Papaver somniferum)
- Pacific bleeding heart (Dicentra formosa)
- pale Mexican pricklypoppy (Argemone ochroleuca)
- Parish's poppy (Eschscholzia parishii)
- scrambled eggs (Corydalis aurea)
- Sonoran pricklypoppy (Argemone gracilenta)

=== Passifloraceae ===
- Arizonia passionflower (Passiflora arizonica)
- corkystem passionflower (Passiflora suberosa)
- cupped passionflower (Passiflora bryonioides)
- damiana (Turnera diffusa)
- grape-leafed passion vine (Passiflora vitifolia)
- Mexican passionflower (Passiflora mexicana)
- scarlet passionflower (Passiflora coccinea)
- slender passionflower (Passiflora filipes)
- twoflower passionflower (Passiflora biflora)
- winged-stem passionflower (Passiflora alata)
- yellow alder (Turnera ulmifolia)

=== Pedaliaceae ===
- sesame (Sesamum indicum)

=== Phrymaceae ===
- bush monkeyflower (Diplacus longiflorus)
- Cleveland monkeyflower (Diplacus clevelandii)
- crimson monkeyflower (Erythranthe verbenacea)
- Eastwood's monkeyflower (Erythranthe eastwoodiae)
- Jacumba monkeyflower (Diplacus aridus)
- little redstem monkeyflower (Erythranthe rubella)
- manyflowered monkeyflower (Erythranthe floribunda)
- red bush monkeyflower (Diplacus puniceus)
- seep monkeyflower (Erythranthe guttata)
- sticky monkeyflower (Diplacus aurantiacus)
- toothpetal monkeyflower (Erythranthe dentiloba)

=== Phyllanthaceae ===
- birdseed leaf-flower (Phyllanthus evanescens)
- smartweed leaf-flower (Phyllanthus polygonoides)

=== Phytolaccaceae ===
- anamu (Petiveria alliacea)
- pokeberry (Phytolacca icosandra)
- rougeplant (Rivina humilis)

=== Picramniaceae ===
- Mexican alvaradoa (Alvaradoa amorphoides)

=== Picrodendraceae ===
- Hall's shrubby-spurge (Tetracoccus hallii)
- red shrubby-spurge (Tetracoccus dioicus)

=== Pinaceae ===
- Apache pine (Pinus engelmannii)
- Arizona pine (Pinus arizonica)
- bishop pine (Pinus muricata)
- border pinyon (Pinus discolor)
- Chihuahuan pine (Pinus leiophylla)
- Douglas-fir (Pseudotsuga menziesii)
- Durango fir (Abies durangensis)
- egg cone pine (Pinus oocarpa)
- Jeffrey pine (Pinus jeffreyi)
- lodgepole pine (Pinus contorta)
- Lumholtz's pine (Pinus lumholtzii)
- Mexican pinyon (Pinus cembroides)
- ocote (Pinus herrerae)
- Parry pinyon (Pinus quadrifolia)
- ponderosa pine (Pinus ponderosa)
- smooth-bark Mexican pine (Pinus pseudostrobus)
- southwestern white pine (Pinus strobiformis)
- sugar pine (Pinus lambertiana)
- thinleaf pine (Pinus maximinoi)
- twoneedle pinyon (Pinus edulis)

=== Piperaceae ===
- four-leaved peperomia (Peperomia tetraphylla)
- Jamaican pepper (Piper hispidum)
- palo hueso (Piper jaliscanum)
- Vera Cruz pepper (Piper auritum)

=== Plantaginaceae ===
- baby jump-up (Mecardonia procumbens)
- Baja bush snapdragon (Galvezia juncea)
- balloonbush (Epixiphium wislizeni)
- bellflower beardtongue (Penstemon campanulatus)
- cardinal beardtongue (Penstemon cardinalis)
- Catalina beardtongue (Penstemon discolor)
- Chinese houses (Collinsia heterophylla)
- Cleveland's beardtongue (Penstemon clevelandii)
- coast plantain (Plantago bigelovii)
- Cochise beardtongue (Penstemon dasyphyllus)
- common plantain (Plantago major)
- common snapdragon (Antirrhinum majus)
- coral plant (Russelia polyedra)
- creeping water hyssop (Bacopa repens)
- desert Indianwheat (Plantago ovata)
- dog's mouth (Pseudorontium cyathiferum)
- Fendler's penstemon (Penstemon fendleri)
- ghost flower (Mohavea confertiflora)
- gilia beardtongue (Penstemon ambiguus)
- hackberry beardtongue (Penstemon subulatus)
- hairy purslane speedwell (Veronica peregrina)
- harlequin spiralseed (Schistophragma intermedia)
- heartleaf keckiella (Keckiella cordifolia)
- island bush snapdragon (Galvezia speciosa)
- James' beardtongue (Penstemon jamesii)
- Mexican plantain (Plantago australis)
- narrowleaf plantain (Plantago lanceolata)
- Parry's beardtongue (Penstemon parryi)
- pineneedle beardtongue (Penstemon pinifolius)
- redseed plantain (Plantago rhodosperma)
- rock penstemon (Penstemon baccharifolius)
- Rocky Mountain penstemon (Penstemon strictus)
- royal penstemon (Penstemon spectabilis)
- saltmeadow plantain (Plantago argyrea)
- scarlet bugler (Penstemon centranthifolius)
- snapdragon vine (Maurandya antirrhiniflora)
- Sonoran beardtongue (Penstemon stenophyllus)
- superb beardtongue (Penstemon superbus)
- Texas toadflax (Nuttallanthus texanus)
- Thurber's penstemon (Penstemon thurberi)
- twining snapdragon (Neogaerrhinum filipes)
- violet snapdragon (Sairocarpus nuttallianus)
- Virginia plantain (Plantago virginica)
- water hyssop (Bacopa monnieri)
- Watson's snapdragon (Sairocarpus watsonii)
- whitemargin beardtongue (Penstemon albomarginatus)
- whitewoolly twintip (Stemodia durantifolia)
- woolly plantain (Plantago patagonica)
- Wright penstemon (Penstemon wrightii)
- yellow bush penstemon (Keckiella antirrhinoides)

=== Platanaceae ===
- Arizona sycamore (Platanus wrightii)
- California sycamore (Platanus racemosa)

=== Plumbaginaceae ===
- Cape plumbago (Plumbago auriculata)
- doctorbush (Plumbago scandens)
- marsh rosemary (Limonium californicum)

=== Poaceae ===
- African lovegrass (Eragrostis echinochloidea)
- Alamos grama (Bouteloua alamosana)
- alkali sacaton (Sporobolus airoides)
- Amazon sprangletop (Leptochloa panicoides)
- Angleton bluestem (Dichanthium aristatum)
- annual bluegrass (Poa annua)
- annual canarygrass (Phalaris canariensis)
- annual muhly (Muhlenbergia minutissima)
- annual rabbitsfoot grass (Polypogon monspeliensis)
- Arabian schismus (Schismus arabicus)
- Arizona bristlegrass (Setaria arizonica)
- Arizona brome (Bromus carinatus)
- Arizona cottontop (Digitaria californica)
- Arizona muhly (Muhlenbergia arizonica)
- Arizona signalgrass (Urochloa arizonica)
- Arizona threeawn (Aristida arizonica)
- Arizona wheatgrass (Elymus arizonicus)
- arrocillo (Paspalum paniculatum)
- Asian crabgrass (Digitaria bicornis)
- bahiagrass (Paspalum notatum)
- bamboo muhly (Muhlenbergia dumosa)
- barnyard grass (Echinochloa crus-galli)
- basketgrass (Oplismenus hirtellus)
- bearded cupgrass (Eriochloa aristata)
- beardless rabbitsfoot grass (Polypogon viridis)
- big bluestem (Andropogon gerardi)
- Bigelow's bluegrass (Poa bigelovii)
- big galleta (Pleuraphis rigida)
- big sacaton (Sporobolus wrightii)
- black grama (Bouteloua eriopoda)
- blackseed crabgrass (Digitaria ternata)
- black spear grass (Heteropogon contortus)
- blue grama (Bouteloua gracilis)
- blue panicum (Panicum antidotale)
- bristly wolfstail (Muhlenbergia alopecuroides)
- broadleaf carpetgrass (Axonopus compressus)
- browntop signalgrass (Urochloa fusca)
- bulb panicgrass (Panicum bulbosum)
- bullgrass (Muhlenbergia emersleyi)
- bur bristlegrass (Setaria adhaerens)
- Burmann's basketgrass (Oplismenus burmannii)
- burrograss (Scleropogon brevifolius)
- buryseed umbrellagrass (Enteropogon chlorideus)
- bush muhly (Muhlenbergia porteri)
- California satintail (Imperata brevifolia)
- California threeawn (Aristida californica)
- cane bluestem (Bothriochloa barbinodis)
- canyon cupgrass (Eriochloa lemmonii)
- carricillo de la sierra (Lasiacis procerrima)
- cattail grass (Setaria pumila)
- cheatgrass (Bromus tectorum)
- Chihuahuan lovegrass (Eragrostis erosa)
- cliff muhly (Muhlenbergia polycaulis)
- climbing tribisee (Lasiacis ruscifolia)
- Colombian bluestem (Schizachyrium condensatum)
- combtop muhly (Muhlenbergia pectinata)
- common barley (Hordeum vulgare)
- common Mediterranean grass (Schismus barbatus)
- common oat (Avena sativa)
- common reed (Phragmites australis)
- common wheat (Triticum aestivum)
- common wild oat (Avena fatua)
- common wolfstail (Lycurus phleoides)
- cotta grass (Cottea pappophoroides)
- crimson bluestem (Schizachyrium sanguineum)
- crimson fountaingrass (Pennisetum setaceum)
- dallisgrass (Paspalum dilatatum)
- deergrass (Muhlenbergia rigens)
- delicate muhly (Muhlenbergia fragilis)
- desert needlegrass (Achnatherum speciosum)
- ditch rabbitsfoot grass (Polypogon interruptus)
- Egyptian grass (Dactyloctenium aegyptium)
- fat-spiked yard grass (Eleusine multiflora)
- feather fingergrass (Chloris virgata)
- feathertop (Pennisetum villosum)
- foldedleaf grass (Andropogon fastigiatus)
- fragilegrass (Aegopogon tenellus)
- giant reed (Arundo donax)
- giant wildrye (Leymus condensatus)
- goldentop grass (Lamarckia aurea)
- gophertail lovegrass (Eragrostis ciliaris)
- gravelbar muhly (Muhlenbergia eludens)
- green muhly (Muhlenbergia ramulosa)
- green sprangletop (Leptochloa dubia)
- Grisebach's bristlegrass (Setaria grisebachii)
- Gulf muhly (Muhlenbergia capillaris)
- hairy crabgrass (Digitaria sanguinalis)
- hairyseed paspalum (Paspalum pubiflorum)
- Hartweg's paspalum (Paspalum hartwegianum)
- hillside crowngrass (Paspalum clavuliferum)
- hood canarygrass (Phalaris paradoxa)
- hurricane grass (Bothriochloa pertusa)
- Indian goosegrass (Eleusine indica)
- Indiangrass (Sorghastrum nutans)
- Indian ricegrass (Achnatherum hymenoides)
- inland saltgrass (Distichlis spicata)
- Jamaican crabgrass (Digitaria horizontalis)
- James' galleta (Pleuraphis jamesii)
- Johnsongrass (Sorghum halepense)
- Judd's grass (Leptochloa virgata)
- jungle rice (Echinochloa colona)
- Kleberg bluestem (Dichanthium annulatum)
- knotgrass (Paspalum distichum)
- Kunth's smallgrass (Microchloa kunthii)
- Latin American crowngrass (Paspalum convexum)
- Lehmann lovegrass (Eragrostis lehmanniana)
- lemongrass (Cymbopogon citratus)
- Liebmann's bristlegrass (Setaria liebmannii)
- little barley (Hordeum pusillum)
- little bluestem (Schizachyrium scoparium)
- littleseed canarygrass (Phalaris minor)
- littleseed muhly (Muhlenbergia microsperma)
- longtongue muhly (Muhlenbergia longiligula)
- lovegrass tridens (Tridens eragrostoides)
- low woollygrass (Dasyochloa pulchella)
- Malabar sprangletop (Leptochloa fusca)
- marine couch (Sporobolus virginicus)
- marsh bristlegrass (Setaria parviflora)
- Mediterranean lovegrass (Eragrostis barrelieri)
- mesa muhly (Muhlenbergia tenuifolia)
- Mexican feathergrass (Nassella tenuissima)
- Mexican gamagrass (Tripsacum lanceolatum)
- Mexican lovegrass (Eragrostis mexicana)
- Mexican panicgrass (Panicum hirticaule)
- Mexican weeping bamboo (Otatea acuminata)
- Mexican windmill grass (Chloris submutica)
- millet crabgrass (Digitaria panicea)
- mission grass (Pennisetum polystachion)
- mountain muhly (Muhlenbergia montana)
- mourning lovegrass (Eragrostis lugens)
- mouse barley (Hordeum murinum)
- mucronate sprangletop (Leptochloa panicea)
- needle grama (Bouteloua aristidoides)
- New Mexico feathergrass (Hesperostipa neomexicana)
- New Mexico muhly (Muhlenbergia pauciflora)
- nineawn pappusgrass (Enneapogon desvauxii)
- nodding fescue (Festuca subverticillata)
- oldfield grass (Anthephora hermaphrodita)
- Palmer saltgrass (Distichlis palmeri)
- para grass (Brachiaria mutica)
- Parry's grama (Bouteloua parryi)
- pine dropseed (Blepharoneuron tricholepis)
- pinyon ricegrass (Piptochaetium fimbriatum)
- pitscale grass (Hackelochloa granularis)
- plains bristlegrass (Setaria macrostachya)
- plains lovegrass (Eragrostis intermedia)
- prairie false oat (Trisetum interruptum)
- prairie wedgescale (Sphenopholis obtusata)
- plantain signalgrass (Brachiaria plantaginea)
- Porter brome (Bromus porteri)
- poverty threeawn (Aristida divaricata)
- prairie Junegrass (Koeleria macrantha)
- Pringle's speargrass (Piptochaetium pringlei)
- purple fountaingrass (Pennisetum advena)
- purple grama (Bouteloua radicosa)
- purple muhly (Muhlenbergia rigida)
- purple threeawn (Aristida purpurea)
- rabo de gato (Arundinella hispida)
- rat-tail fescue (Vulpia myuros)
- red brome (Bromus rubens)
- red fescue (Festuca rubra)
- relaxgrass (Aegopogon cenchroides)
- rescuegrass (Bromus catharticus)
- ripgut brome (Bromus diandrus)
- rose Natal grass (Melinis repens)
- Rothrock's grama (Bouteloua rothrockii)
- rough bentgrass (Agrostis scabra)
- running mountaingrass (Oplismenus compositus)
- rustyseed paspalum (Paspalum langei)
- rye (Secale cereale)
- sand dropseed (Sporobolus cryptandrus)
- Santa Rita Mountain grama (Bouteloua eludens)
- screwleaf muhly (Muhlenbergia virescens)
- serillo dulce (Schizachyrium brevifolium)
- shortleaf woollygrass (Erioneuron avenaceum)
- silver beardgrass (Bothriochloa laguroides)
- single threeawn (Aristida schiedeana)
- sixweeks fescue (Vulpia octoflora)
- sixweeks grama (Bouteloua barbata)
- sixweeks threeawn (Aristida adscensionis)
- slender grama (Bouteloua repens)
- slender hairgrass (Deschampsia elongata)
- slender little bluestem (Schizachyrium tenerum)
- slimbristle sandbur (Cenchrus brownii)
- slim tridens (Tridens muticus)
- small fescue (Vulpia microstachys)
- smooth crabgrass (Digitaria ischaemum)
- smut grass (Sporobolus indicus)
- soft feather pappusgrass (Enneapogon mollis)
- Sonoran panicgrass (Panicum sonorum)
- sourgrass (Digitaria insularis)
- southern crabgrass (Digitaria ciliaris)
- southern sandbur (Cenchrus echinatus)
- southwestern muhly (Muhlenbergia palmeri)
- spidergrass (Aristida ternipes)
- spike bentgrass (Agrostis exarata)
- spiked crinkleawn (Trachypogon spicatus)
- spike dropseed (Sporobolus contractus)
- sprawling signalgrass (Brachiaria reptans)
- sprucetop grama (Bouteloua chondrosioides)
- St. Augustine grass (Stenotaphrum secundatum)
- sticky sprangletop (Leptochloa viscida)
- stinkgrass (Eragrostis cilianensis)
- streambank rabbitsfoot grass (Polypogon elongatus)
- streambed bristlegrass (Setaria leucopila)
- sweet tanglehead (Heteropogon melanocarpus)
- swollen fingergrass (Chloris barbata)
- sycamore muhly (Muhlenbergia elongata)
- tall fescue (Festuca arundinacea)
- tapered rosette grass (Dichanthelium acuminatum)
- tapertip cupgrass (Eriochloa acuminata)
- Texas bluestem (Schizachyrium cirratum)
- Texas muhly (Muhlenbergia texana)
- thin paspalum (Paspalum setaceum)
- tobosagrass (Pleuraphis mutica)
- tropical crabgrass (Digitaria argillacea)
- tropical panicgrass (Panicum trichoides)
- tufted lovegrass (Eragrostis pectinacea)
- tumble windmill grass (Chloris verticillata)
- twoflower chloris (Chloris crinita)
- Uruguayan pampas grass (Cortaderia selloana)
- vine mesquite (Panicum obtusum)
- Virlet's paspalum (Paspalum virletii)
- weeping lovegrass (Eragrostis curvula)
- whiplash pappusgrass (Pappophorum vaginatum)
- whorled dropseed (Sporobolus coromandelianus)
- winged panicgrass (Panicum alatum)
- winter bentgrass (Agrostis hyemalis)
- woollyspike balsamscale (Elionurus barbiculmis)
- Wooton's threeawn (Aristida pansa)

=== Polemoniaceae ===
- Bigelow's linanthus (Linanthus bigelovii)
- bluebowls (Giliastrum rigidulum)
- bluehead gilia (Gilia capitata)
- California prickly phlox (Leptodactylon californicum)
- Chisos Mountain false calico (Loeselia greggii)
- desert beauty (Linanthus bellus)
- El Paso skyrocket (Ipomopsis thurberi)
- false babystars (Leptosiphon androsaceus)
- glandular false calico (Loeselia glandulosa)
- granite prickly phlox (Linanthus pungens)
- ground pink (Linanthus dianthiflorus)
- Jones' linanthus (Linanthus jonesii)
- Lemmon's linanthus (Leptosiphon lemmonii)
- lesser yellowthroat gilia (Gilia flavocincta)
- longtube ipomopsis (Ipomopsis macrosiphon)
- Macomb's ipomopsis (Ipomopsis macombii)
- manyflowered ipomopsis (Ipomopsis multiflora)
- miniature woollystar (Eriastrum diffusum)
- Nuttall's linanthus (Leptosiphon nuttallii)
- San Luis Mountain ipomopsis (Ipomopsis pinnata)
- Santa Catalina Mountain phlox (Phlox tenuifolia)
- star gilia (Gilia stellata)

=== Polygalaceae ===
- blue milkwort (Polygala barbeyana) Hebecarpa barbeyana???
- blue pygmyflower (Monnina wrightii)
- glandleaf milkwort (Hebecarpa macradenia, formerly Polygala macradenia)
- tropical milkwort (Senega glochidiata, formerly Polygala glochidiata)
- velvetseed milkwort (Polygala obscura)
- white milkwort (Senega alba, formerly Polygala alba)
- winged milkwort (Senega hemipterocarpa, formerly Polygala hemipterocarpa)

=== Polygonaceae ===
- bastardsage (Eriogonum wrightii)
- bitter dock (Rumex obtusifolius)
- canaigre dock (Rumex hymenosepalus)
- Chiricahua Mountain dock (Rumex orthoneurus)
- clustered dock (Rumex conglomeratus)
- Confederate vine (Antigonon leptopus)
- curlytop knotweed (Polygonum lapathifolium)
- devil's spineflower (Chorizanthe rigida)
- eastern Mojave buckwheat (Eriogonum fasciculatum)
- flatcrown buckwheat (Eriogonum deflexum)
- fringed spineflower (Chorizanthe fimbriata)
- kidneyleaf buckwheat (Eriogonum reniforme)
- naked buckwheat (Eriogonum nudum)
- narrowleaf dock (Rumex stenophyllus)
- oval-leaf knotweed (Polygonum arenastrum)
- Palmer's buckwheat (Eriogonum palmerianum)
- Pennsylvania smartweed (Polygonum pensylvanicum)
- prostrate knotweed (Polygonum aviculare)
- rabbit's purse (Harfordia macroptera)
- red buckwheat (Eriogonum atrorubens)
- saffron buckwheat (Eriogonum crocatum)
- sheep sorrel (Rumex acetosella)
- silversheath knotweed (Polygonum argyrocoleon)
- Sonoran sea grape (Coccoloba goldmanii)
- sorrel buckwheat (Eriogonum polycladon)
- spotted buckwheat (Eriogonum maculatum)
- spotted ladysthumb (Persicaria maculosa)
- Thomas' buckwheat (Eriogonum thomasii)
- Thurber's buckwheat (Eriogonum thurberi)
- toothed dock (Rumex dentatus)
- water-pepper (Persicaria hydropiper)
- willow dock (Rumex salicifolius)
- woodland pterostegia (Pterostegia drymarioides)

=== Polypodiaceae ===
- Arizona scaly polypody (Pleopeltis thyssanolepis)
- narrow strapfern (Campyloneurum angustifolium)
- redscale scaly polypody (Pleopeltis polylepis)
- resurrection fern (Pleopeltis polypodioides)
- Rio Grande scaly polypody (Pleopeltis riograndensis)
- western polypody (Polypodium hesperium)

=== Pontederiaceae ===
- blue mudplantain (Heteranthera limosa)
- common water hyacinth (Eichhornia crassipes)
- egret mudplantain (Heteranthera peduncularis)
- peacock hyacinth (Eichhornia azurea)
- roundleaf mudplantain (Heteranthera rotundifolia)

=== Portulacaceae ===
- kiss me quick (Portulaca pilosa)
- rose moss (Portulaca grandiflora)
- shrubby purslane (Portulaca suffrutescens)
- silkcotton purslane (Portulaca halimoides)

=== Potamogetonaceae ===
- horned pondweed (Zannichellia palustris)
- longleaf pondweed (Potamogeton nodosus)
- sago pondweed (Stuckenia pectinatus)

=== Primulaceae ===
- chaffweed (Anagallis minima)
- Chiricahua Mountain brookweed (Samolus vagans)
- cudjoe-wood (Bonellia macrocarpa)
- limewater brookweed (Samolus ebracteatus)
- Rusby's primrose (Primula rusbyi)
- seaside brookweed (Samolus valerandi)
- uva cimarrona (Ardisia revoluta)
- western rockjasmine (Androsace occidentalis)

=== Psilotaceae ===
- flatfork fern (Psilotum complanatum)
- whisk fern (Psilotum nudum)

=== Pteridaceae ===
- Alabama lipfern (Cheilanthes alabamensis)
- Arizona lipfern (Cheilanthes arizonica)
- beaded lipfern (Cheilanthes wootonii)
- Cochise scaly cloakfern (Astrolepis cochisensis)
- common maidenhair (Adiantum capillus-veneris)
- copper fern (Bommeria hispida)
- Cretan brake (Pteris cretica)
- Dixie silverback fern (Pityrogramma calomelanos)
- fairyswords (Cheilanthes lindheimeri)
- five-finger fern (Adiantum pedatum)
- fuzzy maidenhair (Adiantum tricholepis)
- glandular lip fern (Cheilanthes kaulfussii)
- golden lipfern (Cheilanthes bonariensis)
- graceful lipfern (Cheilanthes yavapensis)
- hairy false cloak fern (Argyrochosma incana)
- heartleaf cliffbrake (Pellaea cordifolia)
- Jones' false cloak fern (Argyrochosma jonesii)
- Lemmon's cloak fern (Notholaena lemmonii)
- nitbearing lipfern (Cheilanthes lendigera)
- ovate-leaf cliffbrake (Pellaea ovata)
- Parry's lipfern (Cheilanthes parryi)
- polished maidenhair (Adiantum concinnum)
- Pringle's lipfern (Cheilanthes pringlei)
- small-leaf false cloak fern (Argyrochosma microphylla)
- southern lipfern (Cheilanthes microphylla)
- southwestern false cloak fern (Argyrochosma limitanea)
- spiny cliffbrake (Pellaea truncata)
- star cloak fern (Notholaena standleyi)
- Trans-Pecos cliffbrake (Pellaea ternifolia)
- villous lipfern (Cheilanthes villosa)
- wavy scaly cloakfern (Astrolepis sinuata)
- white-footed lipfern (Cheilanthes leucopoda)
- Windham's scaly cloakfern (Astrolepis windhamii)
- woolly lipfern (Cheilanthes tomentosa)
- Wright's cliffbrake (Pellaea wrightiana)
- Wright's lipfern (Cheilanthes wrightii)

=== Ranunculaceae ===
- alkali buttercup (Ranunculus cymbalaria)
- Arizona buttercup (Ranunculus arizonicus)
- Arizona mousetail (Myosurus cupulatus)
- candle anemone (Anemone cylindrica)
- Chiricahua Mountain columbine (Aquilegia triternata)
- Chiricahua Mountain larkspur (Delphinium andesicola)
- Colorado blue columbine ( Aquilegia coerulea)
- Drummond's clematis (Clematis drummondii)
- doubtful knight's-spur (Consolida ajacis)
- eastern red columbine (Aquilegia canadensis)
- Latin American buttercup (Ranunculus fascicularis)
- longspur columbine (Aquilegia longissima)
- red larkspur (Delphinium cardinale)
- tall mountain larkspur (Delphinium scaposum)
- tuber anemone (Anemone tuberosa)
- water buttercup (Ranunculus aquatilis)
- western columbine (Aquilegia formosa)

=== Resedaceae ===
- lineleaf whitepuff (Oligomeris linifolia)
- lollipop tree (Forchhammeria watsonii)

=== Rhamnaceae ===
- birchleaf buckthorn (Rhamnus betulifolia)
- bitter snakewood (Condalia globosa)
- buckbrush (Ceanothus depressus)
- Correll's snakewood (Condalia correllii)
- coyotillo (Karwinskia humboldtiana)
- deerbriar (Ceanothus buxifolius)
- deerbrush (Ceanothus integerrimus)
- guirote de violín (Gouania rosei)
- hollyleaf redberry (Rhamnus crocea subsp. ilicifolia, Rhamnus ilicifolia)
- jujube (Ziziphus jujuba)
- knifeleaf condalia (Condalia spathulata)
- Las Animas nakedwood (Colubrina californica)
- lotebush (Ziziphus obtusifolia)
- redberry buckthorn (Rhamnus crocea)
- redheart (Ceanothus spinosus)
- San Diego ceanothus (Ceanothus cyaneus)
- spinebush (Adolphia californica)
- Warnock's snakewood (Condalia warnockii)
- Wright's mock buckthorn (Sageretia wrightii)

=== Rhizophoraceae ===
- red mangrove (Rhizophora mangle)

=== Rosaceae ===
- antelope bitterbrush (Purshia tridentata)
- Apache plume (Fallugia paradoxa)
- Arizona mountain ash (Sorbus dumosa)
- Arizona rose (Rosa arizonica)
- Arizona rosewood (Vauquelinia californica)
- Baja rose (Rosa minutifolia)
- blackbrush (Coleogyne ramosissima)
- black cherry (Prunus serotina)
- chamise (Adenostoma fasciculatum)
- desert apricot (Prunus fremontii)
- desert bitterbrush (Purshia glandulosa)
- desert peach (Prunus andersonii)
- European pear (Pyrus communis)
- fernbush (Chamaebatiaria millefolium)
- Gentry cherry (Prunus gentryi)
- Himalayan blackberry (Rubus discolor)
- hollyleaf cherry (Prunus ilicifolia)
- Mexican serviceberry (Amelanchier denticulata)
- mountain mahogany (Cercocarpus montanus)
- New Mexico cinquefoil (Potentilla oblanceolata)
- oceanspray (Holodiscus discolor)
- peach (Prunus persica)
- redshanks (Adenostoma sparsifolium)
- rockspiraea (Holodiscus dumosus)
- scarlet cinquefoil (Potentilla thurberi)
- serviceberry (Amelanchier alnifolia)
- shrubby cinquefoil (Potentilla fruticosa)
- slimleaf rosewood (Vauquelinia corymbosa)
- Stansbury cliffrose (Purshia stansburiana)
- tall hairy agrimony (Agrimonia gryposepala)
- toyon (Heteromeles arbutifolia)
- Virginia strawberry (Fragaria virginiana)

=== Rubiaceae ===
- bracted bedstraw (Galium microphyllum)
- bristly bedstraw (Galium uncinulatum)
- cleavers (Galium aparine)
- common buttonbush (Cephalanthus occidentalis)
- copalquín (Hintonia latiflora)
- David's milkberry (Chiococca alba)
- firecrackerbush (Bouvardia ternifolia)
- Florida pusley (Richardia scabra)
- limestone bedstraw (Galium proliferum)
- Mexican bedstraw (Galium mexicanum)
- Mexican buttonbush (Cephalanthus salicifolius)
- mountain saucerflower (Crusea diversifolia)
- poorjoe (Diodia teres)
- pygmy bluet (Houstonia wrightii)
- river false buttonweed (Spermacoce confusa)
- scarlet bush (Hamelia patens)
- shrubby false buttonweed (Spermacoce verticillata)
- slender false buttonweed (Spermacoce tenuior)
- starry bedstraw (Galium stellatum)
- tropical buttonweed (Diodia sarmentosa)
- tropical girdlepod (Mitracarpus hirtus)
- white girdlepod (Mitracarpus breviflorus)
- woodland false buttonweed (Spermacoce assurgens)

=== Rutaceae ===
- balsam torchwood (Amyris balsamifera)
- bitter orange (Citrus aurantium)
- Dutchman's breeches (Thamnosma texanum)
- grapefruit (Citrus paradisi)
- hoptree (Ptelea trifoliata)
- Key lime (Citrus aurantifolia)
- lemon (Citrus limon)
- lime pricklyash (Zanthoxylum fagara)
- Mexican orange (Choisya dumosa)
- orange (Citrus sinensis)
- palo amarillo (Esenbeckia flava)
- rue (Ruta graveolens)
- spicebush (Cneoridium dumosum)
- turpentinebroom (Thamnosma montana)
- white sapote (Casimiroa edulis)

=== Salicaceae ===
- Bonpland willow (Salix bonplandiana)
- brush holly (Xylosma flexuosa)
- Frémont cottonwood (Populus fremontii)
- Goodding's willow (Salix gooddingii)
- mountain cottonwood (Populus brandegeei)
- narrowleaf willow (Salix exigua)
- quaking aspen (Populus tremuloides)
- yewleaf willow (Salix exilifolia)

=== Salviniaceae ===
- Carolina mosuitofern (Azolla caroliniana)
- Mexican mosquitofern (Azolla mexicana)
- Pacific mosquitofern (Azolla filiculoides)

=== Santalaceae ===
- Bollean mistletoe (Phoradendron bolleanum)
- downy mistletoe (Phoradendron capitellatum)
- guacimilla de canario (Phoradendron quadrangulare)
- Huachuca Mountain dwarf mistletoe (Arceuthobium gillii)
- juniper mistletoe (Phoradendron juniperinum)
- mesquite mistletoe (Phoradendron californicum)
- pineland dwarf mistletoe (Arceuthobium vaginatum)
- western dwarf mistletoe (Arceuthobium campylopodum)

=== Sapindaceae ===
- bigtooth maple (Acer grandidentatum)
- California buckeye (Aesculus californica)
- faux persil (Cardiospermum corindum)
- Florida hopbush (Dodonaea viscosa)
- love in a puff (Cardiospermum halicacabum)
- Mexican buckeye (Ungnadia speciosa)
- moldy bread and cheese (Paullinia fuscescens)
- Parry buckeye (Aesculus parryi)
- serpent's tooth vine (Serjania mexicana)
- western soapberry (Sapindus saponaria)

=== Sapotaceae ===
- bebelamo (Sideroxylon occidentale)
- bully (Sideroxylon persimile)
- mamey sapote (Pouteria sapota)
- sapodilla (Manilkara zapota)
- tempisque (Sideroxylon tepicense)

=== Saururaceae ===
- yerba mansa (Anemopsis californica)

=== Saxifragaceae ===
- pink alumroot (Heuchera rubescens)
- redfuzz saxifrage (Saxifraga eriophora)

=== Schisandraceae ===
- star anise (Illicium verum)

=== Schoepfiaceae ===
- gulf graytwig (Schoepfia schreberi)

=== Scrophulariaceae ===
- California figwort (Scrophularia californica)
- Chihuahuan sage (Leucophyllum laevigatum)
- common mullein (Verbascum thapsus)
- goatweed (Capraria biflora)
- poverty bush (Eremophila decipiens)
- rain sage (Leucophyllum zygophyllum)
- Rio Bravo sage (Leucophyllum langmaniae)
- Rio Grande butterfly bush (Buddleja sessiliflora)
- Sierra Bouquet sage (Leucophyllum pruinosum)
- silverleaf sage (Leucophyllum candidum)
- Texas ranger (Leucophyllum frutescens)
- woolly butterfly bush (Buddleja marrubiifolia)

=== Selaginellaceae ===
- Arizona spikemoss (Selaginella arizonica)
- Peruvian spikemoss (Selaginella peruviana)
- resurrection fern (Selaginella novoleonensis)
- resurrection plant (Selaginella pilifera)
- rockloving spikemoss (Selaginella rupincola)
- Underwood's spikemoss (Selaginella underwoodii)
- Wright's spikemoss (Selaginella wrightii)

=== Simaroubaceae ===
- crucifixion thorn (Castela emoryi)
- Stewart's crucifixion thorn (Castela stewartii)
- tree of heaven (Ailanthus altissima)

=== Simmondsiaceae ===
- jojoba (Simmondsia chinensis)

=== Solanaceae ===
- American black nightshade (Solanum americanum)
- apple of Peru (Nicandra physalodes)
- Arizona desert-thorn (Lycium exsertum)
- Baja desert-thorn (Lycium brevipes)
- Berlandier's wolfberry (Lycium berlandieri)
- black nightshade (Solanum nigrum)
- Brazilian nightshade (Solanum seaforthianum)
- broadleaf groundcherry (Physalis latiphysa)
- buffalobur nightshade (Solanum rostratum)
- bush-violet (Browallia eludens)
- California desert-thorn (Lycium californicum)
- chili pepper (Capsicum annuum)
- Chinese lantern (Quincula lobata)
- Chinese thorn-apple (Datura quercifolia)
- Cleveland's tobacco (Nicotiana clevelandii)
- creeping false holly (Jaltomata procumbens)
- cultivated tobacco (Nicotiana tabacum)
- cutleaf groundcherry (Physalis angulata)
- desert thorn-apple (Datura discolor)
- desert wolfberry (Lycium macrodon)
- divine nightshade (Solanum nigrescens)
- Frémont's desert-thorn (Lycium fremontii)
- fuzzyfruit nightshade (Solanum candidum)
- heartleaf nightshade (Solanum cardiophyllum)
- Hinds' nightshade (Solanum hindsianum)
- husk tomato (Physalis pubescens)
- ivyleaf groundcherry (Physalis hederifolia)
- Jamaican forget-me-not (Browallia americana)
- Jerusalem cherry (Solanum pseudocapsicum)
- jimsonweed (Datura stramonium)
- melonleaf nightshade (Solanum heterodoxum)
- netted globecherry (Margaranthus solanaceus)
- Parish's desert-thorn (Lycium parishii)
- potatotree (Solanum erianthum)
- pricklyburr (Datura innoxia)
- pygmy groundcherry (Physalis minima)
- sacred thorn-apple (Datura wrightii)
- seaside petunia (Calibrachoa parviflora)
- sharpleaf groundcherry (Physalis acutifolia)
- silverleaf nightshade (Solanum elaeagnifolium)
- sonoita nightshade (Solanum adscendens)
- Sonoran nightshade (Solanum lumholtzianum)
- southwestern groundcherry (Physalis caudella)
- sticky nightshade (Solanum sisymbriifolium)
- Tex-Mex tobacco (Nicotiana plumbaginifolia)
- tomato (Solanum lycopersicon)
- tree tobacco (Nicotiana glauca)
- tropical groundcherry (Physalis patula)
- violetflower petunia (Petunia integrifolia)
- yellow nightshade groundcherry (Physalis crassifolia)

=== Stegnospermataceae ===
- Stegnosperma halimifolium

=== Talinaceae ===
- jewels of Opar (Talinum paniculatum)
- Ceylon spinach (Talinum triangulare)

=== Tamaricaceae ===
- Athel tamarisk (Tamarix aphylla)
- five-stamen tamarisk (Tamarix chinensis)

=== Tetrachondraceae ===
- juniper leaf (Polypremum procumbens)

=== Thelypteridaceae ===
- red maiden fern (Thelypteris rudis)
- roughhairy maiden fern (Thelypteris hispidula)
- showy maiden fern (Christella puberula)
- softhairy maiden fern (Thelypteris pilosa)

=== Tropaeolaceae ===
- nasturtium (Tropaeolum majus)

=== Typhaceae ===
- broadleaf cattail (Typha latifolia)
- dwarf cattail (Typha angustifolia)
- southern cattail (Typha domingensis)

=== Ulmaceae ===
- Siberian elm (Ulmus pumila)

=== Urticaceae ===
- artillery plant (Pilea microphylla)
- Coamo River pouzolzsbush (Pouzolzia occidentalis)
- dwarf nettle (Urtica urens)
- flameberry (Urera caracasana)
- Florida pellitory (Parietaria floridana)
- heartleaf nettle (Urtica chamaedryoides)
- mountain nettle (Urtica gracilenta)
- Pennsylvania pellitory (Parietaria pensylvanica)

=== Verbenaceae ===
- bigbract verbena (Verbena bracteata)
- brushland shrubverbena (Lantana achyranthifolia)
- Carolina vervain (Verbena carolina)
- catstongue (Priva lappulacea)
- common lantana (Lantana camara)
- common vervain (Verbena officinalis)
- Dakota mock vervain (Glandularia bipinnatifida)
- gray vervain (Verbena canescens)
- Mexican oregano (Lippia graveolens)
- mountain mock vervain (Glandularia elegans)
- Peruvian verbena (Verbena peruviana)
- pink mock vervain (Glandularia pumila)
- purple porterweed (Stachytarpheta frantzii)
- queen's wreath (Petrea volubilis)
- rock verbena (Verbena tenera)
- rose vervain (Glandularia canadensis)
- sandpaper verbena (Verbena rigida)
- seashore vervain (Verbena litoralis)
- South American mock vervain (Glandularia pulchella)
- southwestern mock vervain (Glandularia gooddingii)
- trailing lantana (Lantana montevidensis)
- turkey tangle fogfruit (Phyla nodiflora)
- West Indian shrubverbena (Lantana urticoides)
- Wright's beebrush (Aloysia wrightii)

=== Viburnaceae ===
- blue elderberry (Sambucus cerulea)

=== Violaceae ===
- western greenviolet (Hybanthus attenuatus)

=== Vitaceae ===
- canyon grape (Vitis arizonica)
- desert wild grape (Vitis girdiana)
- princess vine (Cissus verticillata)
- sorrelvine (Cissus trifoliata)
- Virginia creeper (Parthenocissus quinquefolia)

=== Woodsiaceae ===
- Cochise cliff fern (Woodsia cochisensis)
- common ladyfern (Athyrium filix-femina)
- Phillips' cliff fern (Woodsia phillipsii)
- Plummer's cliff fern (Physematium plummerae)
- Reeves' bladderfern (Cystopteris reevesiana)

=== Zamiaceae ===
- chestnut dioon (Dioon edule)

=== Zygophyllaceae ===
- Arizona poppy (Kallstroemia grandiflora)
- California caltrop (Kallstroemia californica)
- California fagonbush (Fagonia laevis)
- creosote bush (Larrea tridentata)
- puncturevine (Tribulus terrestris)
- sticky fagonbush (Fagonia pachyacantha)
- warty caltrop (Kallstroemia parviflora)

== Flora without common names by scientific name ==
Other flora of the Sonoran Desert Region include:

=== Acanthaceae ===
- Anisacanthus andersonii
- Anisacanthus puberulus
- Aphanosperma sinaloensis
- Carlowrightia fuertensis
- Carlowrightia glabrata
- Carlowrightia pectinata
- Dyschoriste hirsutissima
- Dyschoriste xylopoda
- Holographis pallida
- Justicia caudata
- Justicia fulvicoma
- Justicia leonardii
- Justicia masiaca
- Justicia mexicana
- Justicia phlebodes
- Justicia salviiflora
- Odontonema cuspidatum
- Pseuderanthemum praecox
- Ruellia intermedia
- Ruellia inundata
- Ruellia lactea
- Siphonoglossa mexicana
- Stenandrium pilosulum
- Tetramerium abditum
- Tetramerium fruticosum
- Tetramerium glandulosum
- Tetramerium tenuissimum
- Tetramerium yaquianum

=== Amaranthaceae ===
- Alternanthera stellata
- Amaranthus brandegeei
- Gomphrena decumbens
- Iresine calea
- Iresine diffusa
- Iresine interrupta
- Iresine palmeri
- Iresine schaffneri
- Salicornia subterminalis

=== Amaryllidaceae ===
- Hymenocallis clivorum
- Zephyranthes lindleyana

=== Anacardiaceae ===
- Rhus schmidelioides

=== Anemiaceae ===
- Anemia affinis
- Anemia jaliscana
- Anemia tomentosa

=== Apiaceae ===
- Donnellsmithia juncea
- Donnellsmithia ternata
- Eryngium beecheyanum
- Eryngium gentryi
- Eryngium longifolium
- Prionosciadium madrense
- Prionosciadium townsendii
- Sanicula liberta
- Tauschia bicolor
- Tauschia madrensis
- Tauschia spellenbergii
- Tauschia tenuifolia

=== Apocynaceae ===
- Asclepias atroviolacea
- Asclepias fournieri
- Asclepias gentryi
- Asclepias jaliscana
- Asclepias jorgeana
- Asclepias leptopus
- Asclepias mirifica
- Asclepias ovata
- Asclepias standleyi
- Asclepias subaphylla
- Funastrum pannosum
- Gonolobus gonoloboides
- Gonolobus uniflorus
- Macroscepis diademata
- Mandevilla hesperia
- Marsdenia edulis
- Matelea altatensis
- Matelea caudata
- Matelea chihuahuensis
- Matelea lesueurii
- Matelea petiolaris
- Matelea pilosa
- Matelea quercetorum
- Matelea sepicola
- Matelea tristiflora
- Matelea tuberosa
- Metastelma californicum
- Metastelma cuneatum
- Metastelma latifolium
- Metastelma minutiflorum
- Metastelma multiflorum
- Pherotrichis schaffneri

=== Aquifoliaceae ===
- Ilex tolucana

=== Araceae ===
- Xanthosoma wendlandii

=== Asparagaceae ===
- Agave aktites
- Agave aurea
- Agave avellanidens
- Agave boscii
- Agave capensis
- Agave cerulata
- Agave gigantensis
- Agave margaritae
- Agave moranii
- Agave pelona
- Agave promontorii
- Agave rhodacantha
- Agave schidigera
- Agave sebastiana
- Agave shrevei
- Agave sobria
- Agave subsimplex
- Agave wocomahi
- Behria tenuiflora
- Dasylirion gentryi
- Dasylirion sereke
- Echeandia mexicana
- Hesperaloe tenuifolia
- Manfreda jaliscana
- Manfreda planifolia
- Manfreda singuliflora

=== Asteraceae ===
- Acmella oppositifolia
- Acmella radicans
- Acourtia patens
- Adenophyllum cancellatum
- Ageratella microphylla
- Ageratina areolaris
- Ageratina calaminthifolia
- Ageratina cardiophylla
- Ageratina hyssopina
- Ageratina palmeri
- Ageratina pichinchensis
- Ageratina sandersii
- Ageratina stricta
- Ageratina thyrsiflora
- Ageratina venulosa
- Ageratina yecorana
- Aldama dentata
- Alloispermum palmeri
- Alloispermum scabrifolium
- Alomia stenolepis
- Alvordia congesta
- Amauria brandegeeana
- Amauria rotundifolia
- Ambrosia bryantii
- Ambrosia camphorata
- Ambrosia carduacea
- Ambrosia magdalenae
- Archibaccharis serratifolia
- Artemisia pringlei
- Astranthium orthopodum
- Baccharis heterophylla
- Bahiopsis tomentosa
- Berlandiera monocephala
- Bidens cornuta
- Bidens gentryi
- Bidens mollifolia
- Bidens refracta
- Bidens riparia
- Bidens rostrata
- Bidens sambucifolia
- Blumea viscosa
- Brickellia brandegeei
- Brickellia diffusa
- Brickellia lewisii
- Brickellia oliganthes
- Brickellia oreithales
- Brickellia sonorana
- Brickellia vernicosa
- Calea urticifolia
- Chaetymenia peduncularis
- Chaptalia runcinata
- Chaptalia texana
- Chromolaena collina
- Chromolaena ovaliflora
- Chromolaena sagittata
- Cirsium rhaphilepis
- Conoclinium mayfieldii
- Conyza apurensis
- Conyza coronopifolia
- Coreocarpus arizonicus
- Coreocarpus dissectus
- Coreocarpus sonoranus
- Cosmos linearifolius
- Cosmos palmeri
- Cosmos pringlei
- Critonia quadrangularis
- Dahlia sherffii
- Decachaeta haenkeana
- Decachaeta scabrella
- Delilia biflora
- Dicoria argentea
- Egletes viscosa
- Elephantopus spicatus
- Encelia halimifolia
- Encelia laciniata
- Erigeron basaseachensis
- Erigeron coronarius
- Erigeron delphinifolius
- Erigeron eruptens
- Erigeron fraternus
- Erigeron fundus
- Erigeron galeottii
- Erigeron jenkinsii
- Erigeron lepidopodus
- Erigeron mayoensis
- Erigeron podophyllus
- Erigeron rhizomactis
- Erigeron strigulosus
- Erigeron wislizeni
- Flaveria oppositifolia
- Flaveria sonorensis
- Florestina tripteris
- Gamochaeta rosacea
- Gnaphalium bourgovii
- Gnaphalium oxyphyllum
- Gnaphalium semilanatum
- Guardiola arguta
- Gutierrezia alamanii
- Helenium laciniatum
- Helenium mexicanum
- Hofmeisteria standleyi
- Hymenothrix palmeri
- Iostephane heterophylla
- Iostephane madrensis
- Jaegeria hirta
- Jaumea peduncularis
- Koanophyllon monanthum
- Koanophyllon sinaloensis
- Laennecia chihuahuana
- Laennecia confusa
- Laennecia pimana
- Lagascea helianthifolia
- Lasianthaea ceanothifolia
- Lasianthaea fruticosa
- Lasianthaea seemannii
- Leibnitzia occimadrensis
- Machaeranthera frutescens
- Machaeranthera stenoloba
- Melampodium appendiculatum
- Melampodium cupulatum
- Melampodium moctezumum
- Melampodium perfoliatum
- Milleria quinqueflora
- Montanoa leucantha
- Nahuatlea arborescens
- Nicolletia trifida
- Parthenium tomentosum
- Pectis barberi
- Pectis exilis
- Pectis pimana
- Pectis purpurea
- Pectis stenophylla
- Pectis uniaristata
- Pectis vandevenderi
- Perityle alamosana
- Perityle cordifolia
- Perityle gentryi
- Perityle microcephala
- Perityle palmeri
- Perymenium buphthalmoides
- Perymenium oxycarphum
- Perymenium pringlei
- Perymenium stenophyllum
- Pinaropappus junceus
- Pinaropappus pooleanus
- Pleurocoronis laphamioides
- Porophyllum coloratum
- Porophyllum crassifolium
- Porophyllum macrocephalum
- Psacalium globosum
- Pseudognaphalium attenuatum
- Pseudognaphalium jaliscense
- Senecio candidissimus
- Senecio sandersii
- Senecio tepopanus
- Senecio umbraculifera
- Simsia amplexicaulis
- Simsia setosa
- Stevia anadenotricha
- Stevia caracasana
- Stevia glandulosa
- Stevia lemmonii
- Stevia martinii
- Stevia origanoides
- Stevia ovata
- Stevia salicifolia
- Stevia scabrella
- Stevia trifida
- Tagetes jaliscensis
- Tagetes pringlei
- Tagetes subulata
- Tagetes triradiata
- Thymophylla anomala
- Tithonia auriculata
- Tithonia calva
- Tithonia tubiformis
- Tomentaurum niveum
- Tridax erecta
- Tridax procumbens
- Tridax tenuifolia
- Tridax yecorana
- Trigonospermum annuum
- Trixis angustifolia
- Trixis michuacana
- Trixis wrightii
- Verbesina callilepis
- Verbesina gentryi
- Verbesina parviflora
- Verbesina synotis
- Vernonia barclayi
- Vernonia joyaliae
- Vernonia triflosculosa
- Vernonia vernonioides
- Viguiera gentryi
- Viguiera lanata
- Viguiera montana
- Viguiera superaxillaris
- Wedelia chihuahuana
- Wedelia gentryi
- Wedelia greenmanii
- Wedelia pimana
- Xanthisma gracile
- Xanthocephalum eradiatum
- Xylothamia diffusa
- Zinnia tenuis
- Zinnia zinnioides

=== Begoniaceae ===
- Begonia angustiloba
- Begonia bicolor
- Begonia gracilis
- Begonia martiana
- Begonia palmeri
- Begonia portillana
- Begonia sandtii

=== Berberidaceae ===
- Berberis higginsae
- Berberis longipes
- Berberis pimana

=== Bignoniaceae ===
- Fridericia mollissima

=== Blechnaceae ===
- Woodwardia spinulosa

=== Boraginaceae ===
- Cryptantha angelica
- Cryptantha grayi
- Heliotropium limbatum
- Heliotropium wigginsii
- Lennoa madreporoides
- Lithospermum discolor
- Lithospermum obovatum
- Lithospermum tubuliflorum
- Phacelia gentryi
- Phacelia pauciflora
- Phacelia platycarpa
- Phacelia scariosa

=== Brassicaceae ===
- Cardamine obliqua
- Ornithocarpa torulosa
- Pennellia microsperma
- Rorippa mexicana
- Sibara angelorum

=== Bromeliaceae ===
- Pitcairnia palmeri
- Tillandsia achyrostachys
- Tillandsia capitata
- Tillandsia elizabethae
- Tillandsia exserta

=== Burseraceae ===
- Bursera cerasifolia

=== Cactaceae ===
- Corynopuntia marenae
- Corynopuntia reflexispina
- Cylindropuntia alcahes
- Cylindropuntia lindsayi
- Cylindropuntia molesta
- Cylindropuntia sanfelipensis
- Cylindropuntia santamaria
- Echinocereus barthelowanus
- Echinocereus bristolii
- Echinocereus ferreirianus
- Echinocereus klapperi
- Echinocereus leucanthus
- Echinocereus mombergerianus
- Echinocereus pacificus
- Echinocereus sciurus
- Echinocereus scopulorum
- Echinocereus stoloniferus
- Ferocactus diguetii
- Ferocactus johnstonianus
- Ferocactus peninsulae
- Ferocactus pottsii
- Ferocactus tiburonensis
- Ferocactus townsendianus
- Glandulicactus uncinatus
- Grusonia robertsii
- Mammillaria albicans
- Mammillaria angelensis
- Mammillaria armillata
- Mammillaria balsasoides
- Mammillaria baumii
- Mammillaria blossfeldiana
- Mammillaria bocensis
- Mammillaria boolii
- Mammillaria brandegeei
- Mammillaria capensis
- Mammillaria cerralboa
- Mammillaria evermanniana
- Mammillaria fraileana
- Mammillaria goodridgei
- Mammillaria halei
- Mammillaria hertrichiana
- Mammillaria hutchisoniana
- Mammillaria insularis
- Mammillaria johnstonii
- Mammillaria klissingiana
- Mammillaria laneusumma
- Mammillaria lindsayi
- Mammillaria marksiana
- Mammillaria matudae
- Mammillaria mazatlanensis
- Mammillaria multidigitata
- Mammillaria neopalmeri
- Mammillaria peninsularis
- Mammillaria perbella
- Mammillaria petrophila
- Mammillaria phitauiana
- Mammillaria pondii
- Mammillaria poselgeri
- Mammillaria pseudoalamensis
- Mammillaria saboae
- Mammillaria schumannii
- Mammillaria standleyi
- Mammillaria tayloriorum
- Opuntia bravoana
- Opuntia fuliginosa
- Opuntia karwinskiana
- Opuntia lagunae
- Opuntia puberula
- Opuntia pubescens
- Opuntia pumila
- Opuntia pycnantha
- Opuntia wilcoxii
- Pachgerocereus orcuttii
- Pachycereus gatesii
- Pereskiopsis porteri

=== Campanulaceae ===
- Diastatea tenera
- Lobelia cordifolia
- Lobelia ehrenbergii
- Lobelia endlichii
- Lobelia goldmanii

=== Capparaceae ===
- Crateva palmeri

=== Caprifoliaceae ===
- Lonicera cerviculata
- Valeriana apiifolia
- Valeriana palmeri

=== Caryophyllaceae ===
- Corrigiola andina
- Drymaria holosteoides
- Drymaria multiflora
- Drymaria villosa

=== Celastraceae ===
- Mortonia palmeri
- Schaefferia shrevei

=== Cistaceae ===
- Helianthemum chihuahuense
- Helianthemum pringlei

=== Cleomaceae ===
- Cleome guianensis
- Cleome melanosperma
- Cleome tenuis

=== Clethraceae ===
- Clethra lanata
- Clethra mexicana

=== Commelinaceae ===
- Commelina leiocarpa
- Gibasis chihuahuensis
- Gibasis linearis
- Gibasis venustula
- Tinantia erecta
- Tinantia longipedunculata
- Tinantia macrophylla
- Tradescantia andrieuxii
- Tradescantia disgrega
- Tradescantia semisomna
- Tripogandra amplexicaulis
- Tripogandra palmeri
- Tripogandra purpurascens

=== Convolvulaceae ===
- Cuscuta boldinghii
- Cuscuta corymbosa
- Cuscuta costaricensis
- Cuscuta desmouliniana
- Cuscuta glabrior
- Cuscuta gracillima
- Cuscuta macrocephala
- Cuscuta polyanthemos
- Cuscuta tinctoria
- Cuscuta vandevenderi
- Evolvulus prostratus
- Evolvulus rotundifolius
- Ipomoea chilopsidis
- Ipomoea clavata
- Ipomoea hartwegii
- Ipomoea intrapilosa
- Ipomoea jalapa
- Ipomoea lactescens
- Ipomoea laeta
- Ipomoea madrensis
- Ipomoea minutiflora
- Ipomoea parasitica
- Ipomoea pedicellaris
- Ipomoea perlonga
- Ipomoea scopulorum
- Ipomoea seaania
- Ipomoea sescossiana
- Jacquemontia abutiloides
- Jacquemontia albida
- Jacquemontia azurea
- Jacquemontia oaxacana
- Jacquemontia polyantha
- Merremia palmeri
- Operculina pteripes

=== Crassulaceae ===
- Crassula solieri
- Crassula tetragona
- Dudleya albiflora
- Dudleya anomala
- Dudleya campanulata
- Dudleya candida
- Dudleya gatesii
- Dudleya guadalupensis
- Dudleya ingens
- Dudleya nubigena
- Dudleya pachyphytum
- Dudleya rigida
- Dudleya rigidiflora
- Echeveria chihuahuaensis
- Echeveria craigiana
- Echeveria paniculata
- Graptopetalum filiferum
- Graptopetalum pusillum
- Sedum alamosanum
- Sedum chihuahuense
- Sedum frutescens
- Sedum lumholtzii
- Sedum madrense
- Sedum mellitulum
- Sedum vinicolor
- Villadia laxa
- Villadia squamulosa

=== Cucurbitaceae ===
- Cyclanthera dieterleana
- Cyclanthera micrantha
- Cyclanthera minima
- Echinopepon cirrhopedunculatus
- Echinopepon coulteri
- Echinopepon racemosus
- Ibervillea sonorae
- Melothria pringlei
- Microsechium helleri
- Polyclathra cucumerina
- Sicyos peninsularis
- Vaseyanthus insularis

=== Cyperaceae ===
- Bulbostylis hispidula
- Bulbostylis tenuifolia
- Carex endlichii
- Carex longicaulis
- Carex marianensis
- Cyperus canus
- Cyperus ischnos
- Cyperus perennis
- Cyperus regiomontanus
- Cyperus semiochraceus
- Cyperus tenerrimus
- Eleocharis svensoniana
- Eleocharis yecorensis
- Fimbristylis pallidula
- Fimbristylis pentastachya
- Fuirena incompleta
- Pycreus aschenbornianus
- Rhynchospora contracta

=== Dennstaedtiaceae ===
- Dennstaedtia distenta

=== Dioscoreaceae ===
- Dioscorea jaliscana
- Dioscorea remotiflora

=== Dryopteridaceae ===
- Elaphoglossum muelleri
- Elaphoglossum rzedowskii
- Phanerophlebia nobilis
- Phanerophlebia umbonata

=== Ebenaceae ===
- Diospyros nidiformis

=== Ericaceae ===
- Arbutus glandulosa
- Comarostaphylis polifolia
- Gaultheria glaucifolia
- Vaccinium confertum

=== Eriocaulaceae ===
- Eriocaulon bilobatum

=== Euphorbiaceae ===
- Acalypha aliena
- Acalypha burquezii
- Acalypha cincta
- Acalypha filipes
- Acalypha papillosa
- Acalypha polystachya
- Acalypha pseudalopecuroides
- Acalypha subviscida
- Adelia brandegeei
- Adelia cinerea
- Adelia obovata
- Bernardia gentryana
- Bernardia mexicana
- Bernardia viridis
- Cnidoscolus maculatus
- Cnidoscolus palmeri
- Croton alamosanus
- Croton boregensis
- Croton fantzianus
- Croton flavescens
- Croton fragilis
- Croton magdalenae
- Croton martinianus
- Croton niveus
- Croton pedicellatus
- Croton pseudoniveus
- Croton subjucundus
- Croton yecorensis
- Dalembertia populifolia
- Ditaxis guatemalensis
- Ditaxis manzanilloana
- Euphorbia alatocaulis
- Euphorbia anychioides
- Euphorbia bracteata
- Euphorbia brandegeei
- Euphorbia californica
- Euphorbia chiribensis
- Euphorbia colletioides
- Euphorbia colorata
- Euphorbia crepuscula
- Euphorbia densiflora
- Euphorbia dioscoreoides
- Euphorbia gentryi
- Euphorbia hexagonoides
- Euphorbia hieronymi
- Euphorbia humayensis
- Euphorbia incerta
- Euphorbia inconstantia
- Euphorbia knuthii
- Euphorbia misella
- Euphorbia nocens
- Euphorbia ocymoidea
- Euphorbia petrina
- Euphorbia pionosperma
- Euphorbia radioloides
- Euphorbia sinaloensis
- Euphorbia sonorae
- Euphorbia sphaerorhiza
- Euphorbia strigosa
- Euphorbia subreniformis
- Euphorbia tomentulosa
- Jatropha cordata
- Jatropha moranii
- Jatropha purpurea
- Jatropha vernicosa
- Manihot caudata
- Manihot chlorosticta
- Manihot rubricaulis
- Sebastiania appendiculata
- Sebastiania cornuta

=== Fabaceae ===
- Acacia brandegeana
- Acacia crinita
- Acacia pringlei
- Acaciella villosa
- Aeschynomene fascicularis
- Aeschynomene nivea
- Aeschynomene petraea
- Astragalus gentryi
- Astragalus sinaloae
- Brongniartia tenuifolia
- Caesalpinia palmeri
- Caesalpinia pumila
- Calliandra grandiflora
- Calliandra tergemina
- Cologania broussonetii
- Cologania cordata
- Cologania procumbens
- Conzattia multiflora
- Coursetia barrancana
- Crotalaria bupleurifolia
- Crotalaria cajanifolia
- Crotalaria filifolia
- Crotalaria maypurensis
- Crotalaria mollicula
- Crotalaria polyphylla
- Crotalaria quercetorum
- Crotalaria rotundifolia
- Dalea alamosana
- Dalea analiliana
- Dalea ananassa
- Dalea capitata
- Dalea cliffortiana
- Dalea cyanea
- Dalea elata
- Dalea leucostachya
- Dalea lutea
- Dalea nelsonii
- Dalea obreniformis
- Dalea pinetorum
- Dalea revoluta
- Dalea tomentosa
- Desmanthus fruticosus
- Desmanthus subulatus
- Desmodium aparines
- Desmodium crassum
- Desmodium distortum
- Desmodium guadalajaranum
- Desmodium hartwegianum
- Desmodium leptoclados
- Desmodium leptomeres
- Desmodium macrostachyum
- Desmodium madrense
- Desmodium molliculum
- Desmodium nicaraguense
- Desmodium orbiculare
- Desmodium plicatum
- Desmodium prehensile
- Desmodium prostratum
- Desmodium urarioides
- Diphysa racemosa
- Ebenopsis confinis
- Eriosema diffusum
- Eriosema grandiflorum
- Eriosema palmeri
- Eriosema pulchellum
- Errazurizia megacarpa
- Galactia acapulcensis
- Indigofera fruticosa
- Leucaena involucrata
- Leucaena lanceolata
- Lonchocarpus hermannii
- Lotus chihuahuanus
- Lotus repens
- Lupinus lesueurii
- Lupinus montanus
- Marina crenulata
- Marina goldmanii
- Marina maritima
- Marina nutans
- Marina palmeri
- Marina peninsularis
- Marina scopa
- Mimosa brandegei
- Mimosa gentryi
- Mimosa guirocobensis
- Mimosa margaritae
- Mimosa moniliformis
- Mimosa palmeri
- Mimosa pauli
- Mimosa purpurascens
- Mimosa tricephala
- Nissolia gentryi
- Nissolia hirsuta
- Nissolia microptera
- Peteria pinetorum
- Psoralea palmeri
- Phaseolus amabilis
- Phaseolus leptostachyus
- Phaseolus ovatifolius
- Phaseolus pauciflorus
- Phaseolus sonorensis
- Platymiscium trifoliolatum
- Pomaria multijuga
- Prosopidastrum mexicanum
- Prosopis palmeri
- Ramirezella strobilophora
- Rhynchosia discolor
- Rhynchosia macrocarpa
- Senna confinis
- Senna pallida
- Senna polyantha
- Senna purpusii
- Tephrosia leucantha
- Tephrosia multifolia
- Tephrosia nicaraguensis
- Tephrosia palmeri
- Tephrosia rhodantha
- Tephrosia saxicola
- Zapoteca formosa

=== Fagaceae ===
- Quercus crassifolia
- Quercus jonesii
- Quercus magnoliifolia
- Quercus mcvaughii
- Quercus perpallida
- Quercus scytophylla
- Quercus sideroxyla
- Quercus tuberculata

=== Fouquieriaceae ===
- Fouquieria formosa
- Fouquieria ochoterenae

=== Gentianaceae ===
- Halenia brevicornis
- Halenia palmeri
- Zeltnera gentryi
- zeltnera setacea

=== Geraniaceae ===
- Geranium charucanum
- Geranium deltoideum
- Geranium mexicanum
- Geranium niveum

=== Gesneriaceae ===
- Achimenes grandiflora
- Columnea arguta

=== Grossulariaceae ===
- Ribes ceriferum
- Ribes dugesii

=== Hydrangeaceae ===
- Philadelphus myrtoides

=== Hypericaceae ===
- Hypericum moranense
- Hypericum pratense
- Hypericum silenoides

=== Hypoxidaceae ===
- Hypoxis potosina

=== Iridaceae ===
- Sisyrinchium convolutum
- Sisyrinchium palmeri
- Sisyrinchium pringlei
- Sisyrinchium tinctorium
- Tigridia multiflora
- Tigridia pringlei
- Tritonia crocosmiiflora

=== Juncaceae ===
- Juncus ebracteatus
- Juncus hybridus
- Luzula racemosa

=== Lamiaceae ===
- Asterohyptis seemannii
- Asterohyptis stellulata
- Hedeoma floribundum
- Hedeoma oblongifolium
- Hedeoma patens
- Hedeoma plicatum
- Hyptis albida
- Hyptis septentrionalis
- Lepechinia caulescens
- Lepechinia schiedeana
- Monarda pringlei
- Salvia emaciata
- Salvia fusca
- Salvia goldmanii
- Salvia iodantha
- Salvia lasiocephala
- Salvia longispicata
- Salvia muscarioides
- Salvia palmeri
- Salvia prasiifolia
- Salvia purpurea
- Salvia roscida
- Salvia seemannii
- Salvia setosa
- Salvia tepicensis
- Salvia townsendii
- Salvia verecunda
- Scutellaria hispidula
- Stachys grahamii
- Stachys pacifica

=== Lauraceae ===
- Persea liebmannii

=== Lentibulariaceae ===
- Pinguicula crenatiloba
- Pinguicula moranensis
- Utricularia livida

=== Liliaceae ===
- Calochortus barbatus
- Calochortus spatulatus
- Calochortus venustulus

=== Linaceae ===
- Linum cruciatum
- Linum pringlei

=== Loasaceae ===
- Eucnide aurea
- Eucnide cordata
- Eucnide hypomalaca
- Gronovia scandens
- Mentzelia adhaerens

=== Loranthaceae ===
- Cladocolea cupulata
- Cladocolea grahamii
- Cladocolea pringlei
- Psittacanthus calyculatus
- Psittacanthus palmeri
- Psittacanthus sonorae
- Struthanthus palmeri

=== Lythraceae ===
- Cuphea caesariata
- Cuphea hookeriana
- Cuphea laminuligera
- Cuphea leptopoda
- Cuphea lobophora

=== Magnoliaceae ===
- Magnolia pacifica

=== Malpighiaceae ===
- Bunchosia sonorensis
- Cottsia linearis
- Echinopterys eglandulosa
- Galphimia vestita
- Gaudichaudia albida
- Heteropterys cotinifolia
- Janusia californica

=== Malvaceae ===
- Abutilon mucronatum
- Allosidastrum hilarianum
- Anoda palmata
- Anoda succulenta
- Ayenia abutilifolia
- Ayenia jaliscana
- Ayenia mexicana
- Ayenia palmeri
- Ayenia paniculata
- Ayenia reflexa
- Bastardiastrum cinctum
- Bastardiastrum incanum
- Bernoullia flammea
- Briquetia sonorae
- Byttneria aculeata
- Gossypium klotzschianum
- Gossypium turneri
- Helicteres baruensis
- Helicteres vegae
- Heliocarpus attenuatus
- Heliocarpus occidentalis
- Heliocarpus palmeri
- Hibiscus citrinus
- Hochreutinera amplexifolia
- Horsfordia exalata
- Horsfordia rotundifolia
- Kosteletzkya depressa
- Kosteletzkya hispidula
- Kosteletzkya thurberi
- Malva pacifica
- Melochia speciosa
- Melochia tomentella
- Periptera punicea
- Pseudabutilon scabrum
- Pseudabutilon thurberi
- Sida alamosana
- Sida collina
- Sida hyalina
- Sidastrum lodiegense
- Sida xanti
- Sphaeralcea axillaris
- Triumfetta brevipes
- Triumfetta chihuahuensis
- Triumfetta discolor
- Triumfetta galeottiana
- Waltheria acuminata
- Waltheria preslii
- Wissadula amplissima
- Wissadula hernandioides

=== Melanthiaceae ===
- Schoenocaulon megarrhizum

=== Melastomataceae ===
- Clidemia petiolaris

=== Nyctaginaceae ===
- Mirabilis gracilis
- Mirabilis oligantha
- Salpianthus macrodontus
- Salpianthus purpurascens

=== Oleaceae ===
- Menodora yecorana

=== Onagraceae ===
- Eulobus sceptrostigma
- Gaura mutabilis
- Gongylocarpus rubricaulis
- Lopezia cornuta
- Lopezia gracilis
- Xylonagra arborea

=== Ophioglossaceae ===
- Botrychium schaffneri

=== Orchidaceae ===
- Bletia amabilis
- Bletia roezlii
- Encyclia adenocarpa
- Encyclia microbulbon
- Encyclia trachycarpa
- Goodyera striata
- Govenia liliacea
- Guarianthe aurantiaca
- Habenaria barbata
- Habenaria clypeata
- Habenaria crassicornis
- Habenaria guadalajarana
- Habenaria jaliscana
- Habenaria novemfida
- Habenaria strictissima
- Hexalectris parviflora
- Kionophyton seminuda
- Malaxis fastigiata
- Malaxis myurus
- Malaxis novogaliciana
- Malaxis pringlei
- Malaxis unifolia
- Oncidium nebulosum
- Ponthieva schaffneri
- Sarcoglottis pauciflora
- Schiedeella eriophora
- Schiedeella llaveana
- Schiedeella michuacana
- Schiedeella rubrocalosa
- Stanhopea maculosa

=== Orobanchaceae ===
- Agalinis peduncularis
- Castilleja ortegae
- Castilleja rhizomata
- Escobedia crassipes
- Seymeria sinaloana

=== Oxalidaceae ===
- Oxalis divergens
- Oxalis nudiflora

=== Papaveraceae ===
- Bocconia arborea
- Papaver commutatum

=== Passifloraceae ===
- Passiflora actinia
- Passiflora helleri
- Passiflora palmeri
- Passiflora porphyretica
- Passiflora quercetorum
- Turnera pumilea

=== Phrymaceae ===
- Mimulus calciphilus
- Mimulus pallens
- Mimulus pennellii

=== Phyllanthaceae ===
- Andrachne microphylla
- Phyllanthus mocinianus

=== Piperaceae ===
- Peperomia asarifolia
- Peperomia campylotropa
- Peperomia deppeana
- Piper villiramulum

=== Plagiogyriaceae ===
- Plagiogyria pectinata

=== Plantaginaceae ===
- Antirrhinum costatum
- Callitriche deflexa
- Mabrya geniculata
- Maurandya flaviflora
- Penstemon eximius
- Penstemon fasciculatus
- Penstemon kunthii
- Penstemon miniatus
- Penstemon wislizeni
- Plantago alismatifolia
- Plantago linearis
- Russelia elongata
- Russelia furfuracea
- Russelia sonorensis
- Schistophragma mexicanum
- Stemodia palmeri
- Veronica mexicana

=== Poaceae ===
- Aristida gibbosa
- Aristida jorullensis
- Aristida laxa
- Arundinella berteroniana
- Bouteloua annua
- Bouteloua quiriegoensis
- Cathestecum brevifolium
- Cenchrus palmeri
- Echinochloa holciformis
- Eragrostis maypurensis
- Eragrostis pringlei
- Festuca breviglumis
- Gouinia virgata
- Hilaria cenchroides
- Jouvea pilosa
- Luziola gracillima
- Lycurus phalaroides
- Muhlenbergia alamosae
- Muhlenbergia annua
- Muhlenbergia argentea
- Muhlenbergia ciliata
- Muhlenbergia crispiseta
- Muhlenbergia diversiglumis
- Muhlenbergia durangensis
- Muhlenbergia flavida
- Muhlenbergia flaviseta
- Muhlenbergia grandis
- Muhlenbergia implicata
- Muhlenbergia lucida
- Muhlenbergia quadridentata
- Muhlenbergia pubescens
- Muhlenbergia schmitzii
- Muhlenbergia scoparia
- Muhlenbergia strictior
- Muhlenbergia tenella
- Muhlenbergia trifida
- Muhlenbergia vaginata
- Panicum parcum
- Panicum sphaerocarpon
- Paspalum guayanerum
- Paspalum lentiginosum
- Paspalum palmeri
- Paspalum squamulatum
- Pennisetum durum
- Pennisetum karwinskyi
- Pereilema crinitum
- Peyritschia deyeuxioides
- Schizachyrium mexicanum
- Schizachyrium semitectum
- Setaria longipila
- Setariopsis auriculata
- Setariopsis latiglumis
- Sorghastrum incompletum
- Sorghastrum nudipes
- Tripsacum dactyloides
- Tripsacum zopilotense
- Trisetum filifolium
- Trisetum viride

=== Podostemaceae ===
- Oserya coulteriana

=== Polemoniaceae ===
- Ipomopsis sonorae
- Loeselia ciliata
- Loeselia pumila
- Polemonium melindae

=== Polygalaceae ===
- Monnina ciliolata
- Polygala aparinoides
- Polygala apopetala
- Polygala berlandieri
- Polygala sinaloae

=== Polypodiaceae ===
- Microgramma vacciniifolia
- Phlebodium areolatum
- Polypodium hartwegianum
- Polypodium subpetiolatum

=== Pteridaceae ===
- Adiantum andicola
- Adiantum braunii
- Adiantum patens
- Adiantum poiretii
- Astrolepis laevis
- Bommeria pedata
- Cheilanthes allosuroides
- Cheilanthes angustifolia
- Cheilanthes brachypus
- Cheilanthes chaerophylla
- Cheilanthes hirsuta
- Cheilanthes lozanoi
- Cheilanthes myriophylla
- Cheilanthes pyramidalis
- Cheilanthes skinneri
- Mildella intramarginalis
- Notholaena candida
- Pellaea sagittata

=== Putranjivaceae ===
- Drypetes gentryi

=== Ranunculaceae ===
- Aquilegia skinneri
- Clematis welwitschii
- Delphinium calcar-equitis
- Delphinium wislizeni
- Thalictrum parvifructum
- Thalictrum pinnatum

=== Rhamnaceae ===
- Ceanothus caeruleus
- Ceanothus ochraceus
- Colubrina triflora
- Colubrina viridis
- Condalia brandegeei
- Frangula pinetorum
- Rhamnus microphylla
- Rhamnus rosei
- Rhamnus scopulorum
- Ziziphus amole

=== Rosaceae ===
- Alchemilla aphanoides (syn. Lachemilla aphanoides)
- Alchemilla pringlei
- Alchemilla procumbens
- Potentilla horrida
- Prunus zinggii
- Purshia plicata
- Rubus humistratus
- Rubus palmeri
- Rubus sierrae

=== Rubiaceae ===
- Bouvardia multiflora
- Bouvardia subcordata
- Chiococca petrina
- Crusea coronata
- Crusea longiflora
- Crusea lucida
- Crusea parviflora
- Crusea psyllioides
- Crusea setosa
- Deppea cornifolia
- Galium hystricocarpum
- Hamelia xorullensis
- Hedyotis vergrandis
- Hoffmannia cuneatissima
- Houstonia spellenbergii
- Psychotria mexiae
- Randia capitata
- Randia echinocarpa
- Randia laevigata
- Randia megacarpa
- Randia mollifolia
- Randia obcordata
- Randia sonorensis
- Randia thurberi
- Spermacoce suaveolens

=== Rutaceae ===
- Zanthoxylum arborescens

=== Salicaceae ===
- Populus mexicana

=== Santalaceae ===
- Arceuthobium yecorense
- Phoradendron brachystachyum
- Phoradendron longifolium
- Phoradendron serotinum

=== Sapindaceae ===
- Cardiospermum tortuosum
- Serjania palmeri
- Thouinia acuminata
- Thouinia villosa

=== Sapotaceae ===
- Sideroxylon capiri
- Sideroxylon leucophyllum

=== Schoepfiaceae ===
- Schoepfia californica
- Schoepfia shreveana

=== Scrophulariaceae ===
- Buddleja cordata
- Buddleja parviflora
- Verbascum italicum

=== Selaginellaceae ===
- Selaginella delicatissima
- Selaginella macrathera
- Selaginella pallescens
- Selaginella porphyrospora
- Selaginella sartorii
- Selaginella sellowii

=== Smilacaceae ===
- Smilax moranensis

=== Solanaceae ===
- Brachistus stramoniifolius
- Capsicum chacoense
- Cestrum tomentosum
- Datura reburra
- Jaltomata chihuahuensis
- Lycianthes surotatensis
- Lycium megacarpum
- Physalis ampla
- Physalis hirsuta
- Physalis microcarpa
- Physalis microphysa
- Physalis pringlei
- Physalis pruinosa
- Physalis purpurea
- Physalis sordida
- Solanum ferrugineum
- Solanum grayi
- Solanum refractum
- Solanum tridynamum
- Solanum umbellatum

=== Talinaceae ===
- Talinum guadalupense
- Talinum multiflorum

=== Urticaceae ===
- Pouzolzia guatemalana

=== Verbenaceae ===
- Aloysia sonorensis
- Bouchea dissecta
- Citharexylum flabellifolium
- Citharexylum scabrum
- Lippia gentryi
- Lippia palmeri
- Lippia umbellata
- Priva aspera
- Priva mexicana
- Verbena moctezumae

=== Violaceae ===
- Hybanthus mexicanus
- Viola grahamii
- Viola hookeriana

=== Vitaceae ===
- Ampelopsis denudata
- Cissus microcarpa
- Cissus tiliacea

=== Woodsiaceae ===
- Woodsia mexicana
- Woodsia mollis

=== Zygophyllaceae ===
- Guaiacum coulteri
- Larrea nitida
- Viscainoa geniculata

== See also ==
- List of Sonoran Desert wildflowers
