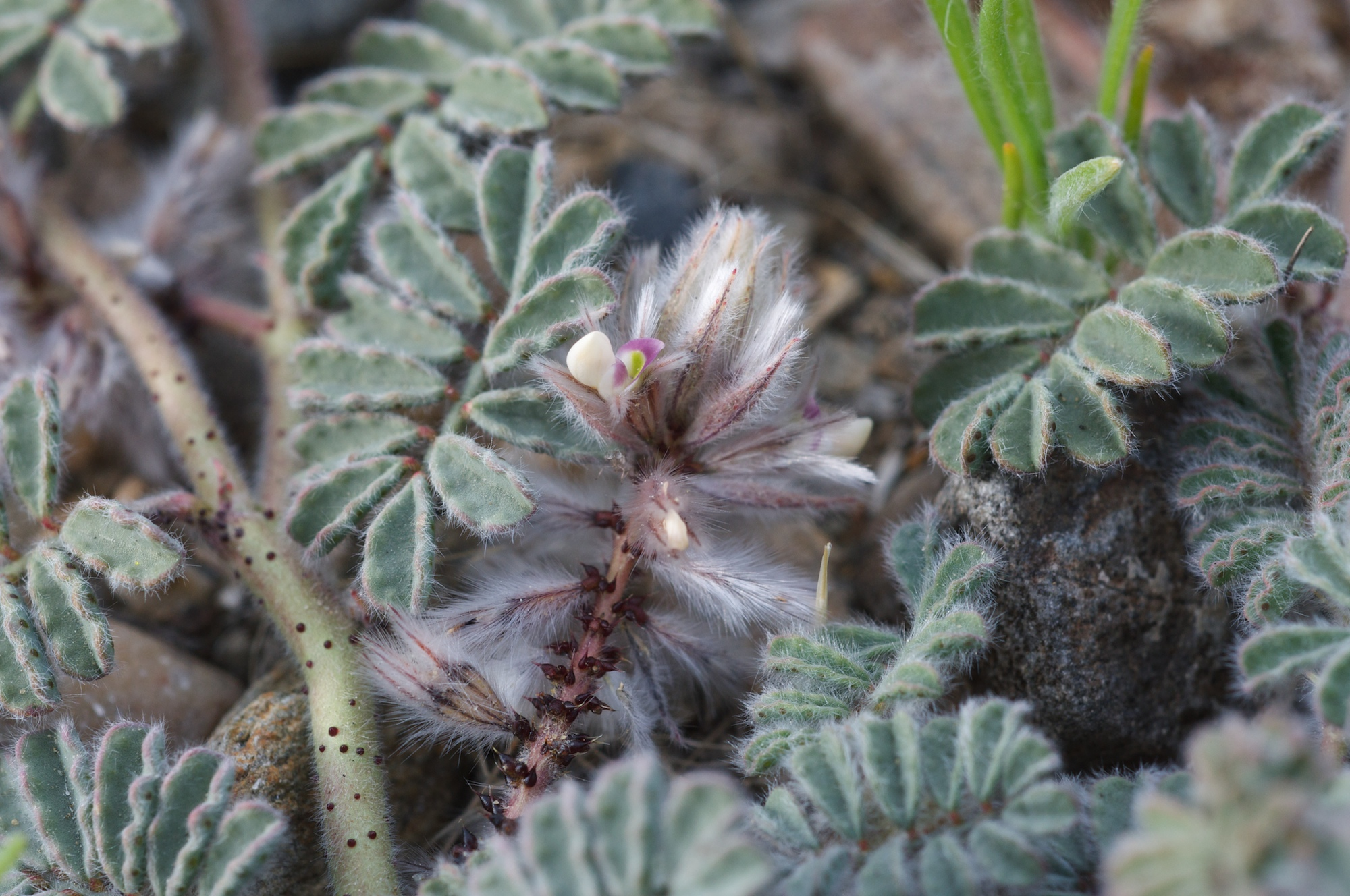

Conservation status
- Apparently Secure (NatureServe)

Scientific classification
- Kingdom: Plantae
- Clade: Tracheophytes
- Clade: Angiosperms
- Clade: Eudicots
- Clade: Rosids
- Order: Fabales
- Family: Fabaceae
- Subfamily: Faboideae
- Genus: Dalea
- Species: D. mollissima

Binomial name
- Dalea mollissima (Rydb.) Munz

= Dalea mollissima =

Species of legume

Dalea mollissima is a desert wildflower plant in the legume family (Fabaceae), with the common names soft prairie clover, downy dalea, and silk dalea.

== Distribution ==
The plant is native to the Mojave Desert, Sonoran Desert, and desert chaparral in adjacent mountains. It is found in California, northeastern Baja California, western Arizona, and southern Nevada.

It grows on desert flats and in washes, under 900 metres (3,000 ft) in elevation.

== Description ==
Dalea mollissima is a small, mat-forming annual or perennial herbaceous plant .

Its leaves are made up of several pairs of oval-shaped fuzz-covered leaflets. The foliage is similar to Dalea mollis, but is covered with thinner, downy hairs.

It bears fluffy inflorescences of pea-like flowers in white or lavender. Its bloom period is March to May.

The fruit is a single-seeded legume pod.
