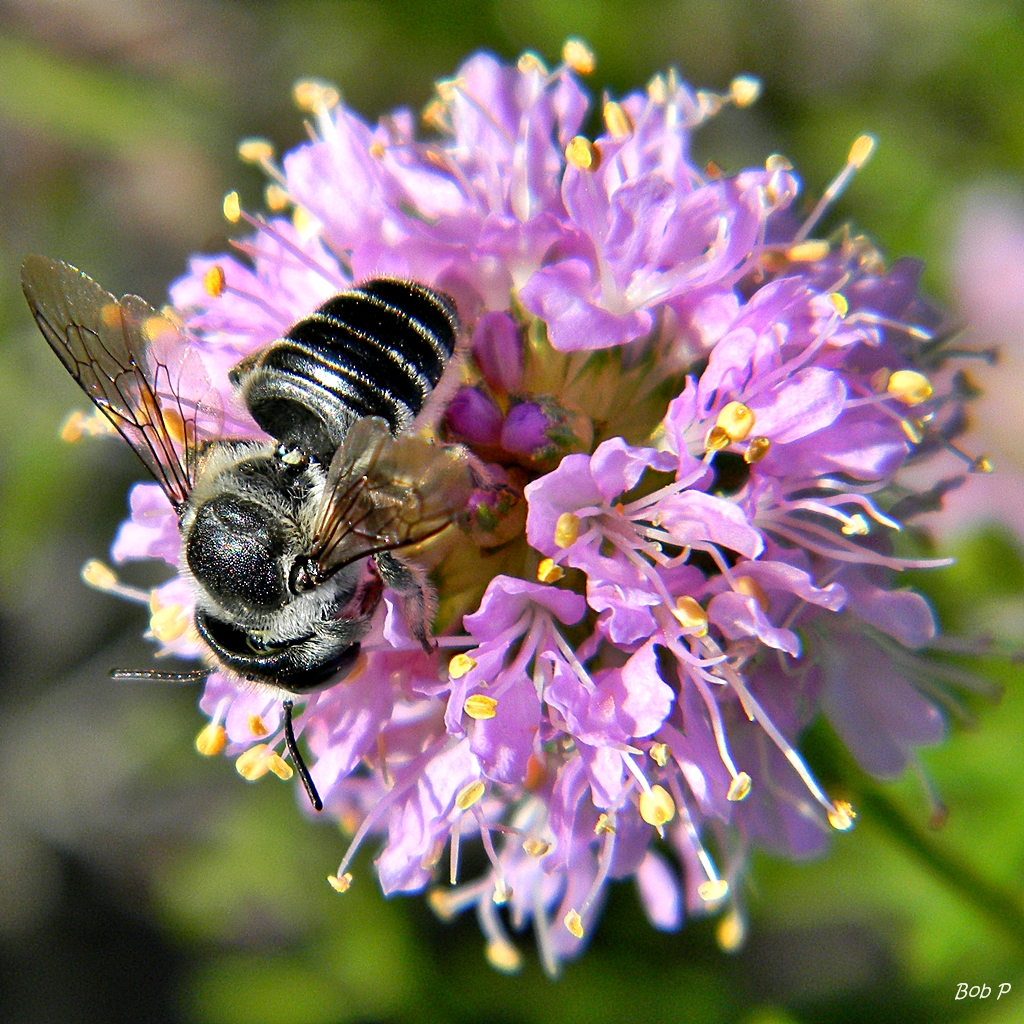
- Leafcutter bee on flower
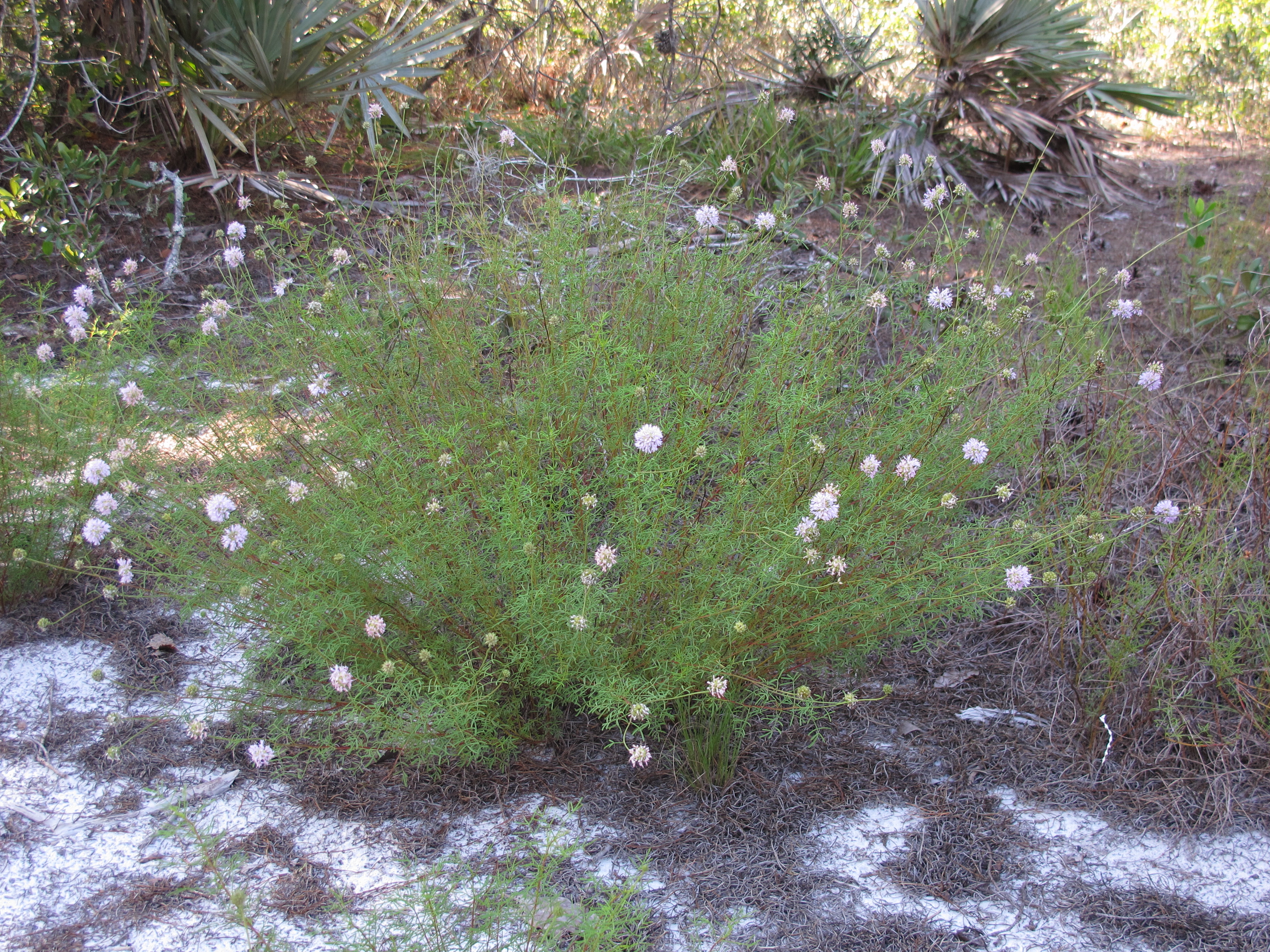
- Habit

Conservation status
- Apparently Secure (NatureServe)

Scientific classification
- Kingdom: Plantae
- Clade: Tracheophytes
- Clade: Angiosperms
- Clade: Eudicots
- Clade: Rosids
- Order: Fabales
- Family: Fabaceae
- Subfamily: Faboideae
- Genus: Dalea
- Species: D. feayi

Binomial name
- Dalea feayi (Chapm.) Barneby

Synonyms
- Kuhnistera feayi (Chapm.) Nash; Petalostemon feayi Chapm.

= Dalea feayi =

Species of plant

Dalea feayi, the globe-headed prairie clover or Feay's prairie clover, is a species of flowering plant in the family Fabaceae, native to the U.S. states of Georgia and Florida. A perennial subshrub reaching 75 cm (30 in), it is favored by native bee species.

D. feayi maybe found in habitats such as open oak scrubs and pine and oak sandhills.
