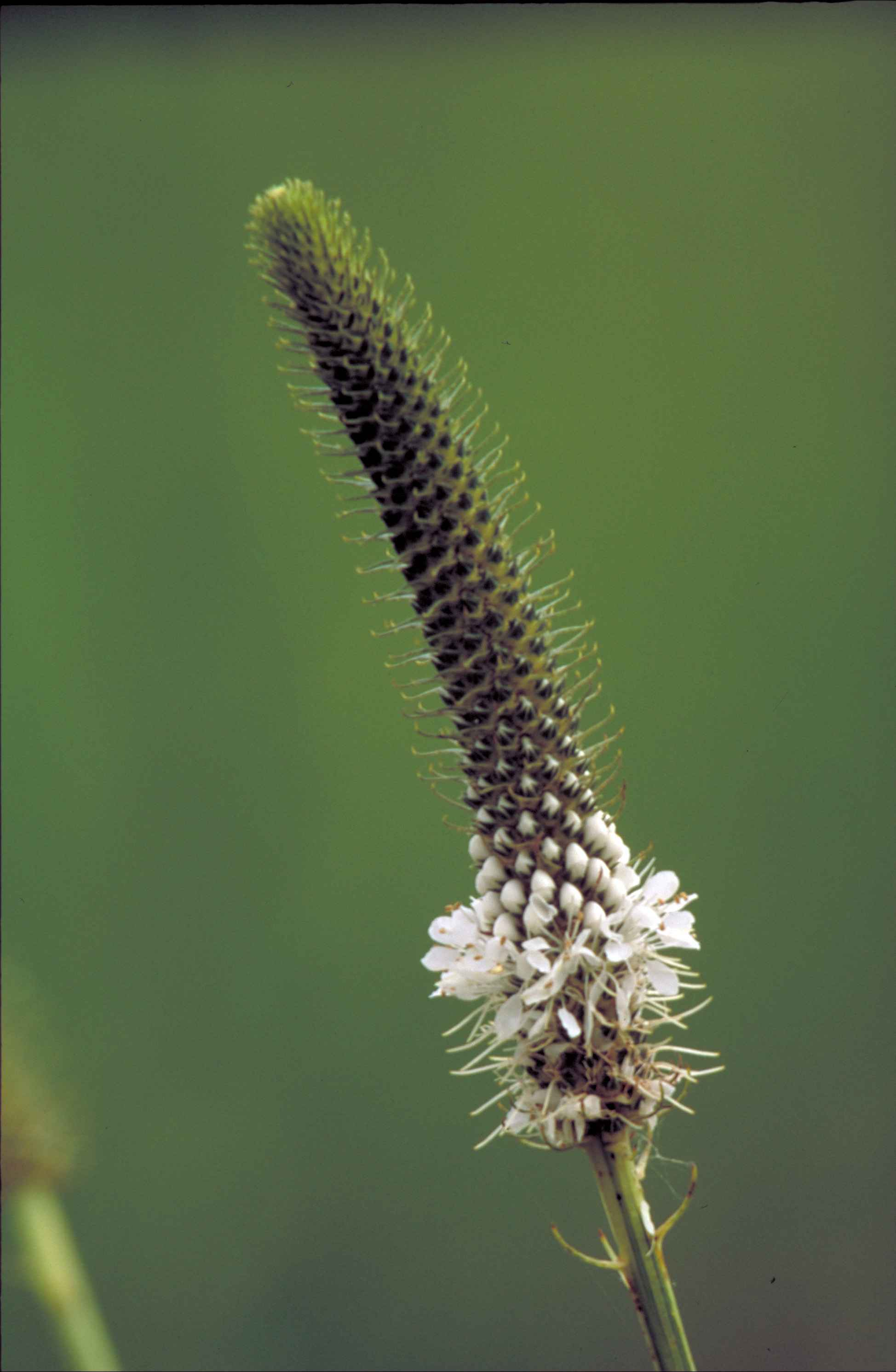
- Dalea candida

Scientific classification
- Kingdom: Plantae
- Clade: Embryophytes
- Clade: Tracheophytes
- Clade: Spermatophytes
- Clade: Angiosperms
- Clade: Eudicots
- Clade: Rosids
- Order: Fabales
- Family: Fabaceae
- Subfamily: Faboideae
- Tribe: Amorpheae
- Genus: Dalea; L. (1758)

Species
- 182–219; see text

Synonyms
- Cylipogon Raf. (1819); Gatesia Bertol. (1848); Jamesia Raf. (1832), nom. rej.; Kuhnistera Lam. (1792), nom. rej.; Parosela Cav. (1801); Petalostemon Michx. (1803); Thornbera Rydb. (1919)

= Dalea =

Genus of legumes

Dalea is a genus of flowering plants in the legume family, Fabaceae. Members of the genus are commonly known as prairie clover or indigo bush. Its name honors English apothecary Samuel Dale (1659–1739). They are native to the Western hemisphere, where they are distributed from Canada to Argentina. Nearly half of the known species are endemic to Mexico. Two species of Dalea (Dalea ornata and Dalea searlsiae) have been considered for rangeland restoration.

== Species ==
Dalea comprises the following species:

- Dalea abietifolia (Rydb.) Bullock
- Dalea acracarpica Barneby
- Dalea adenopoda (Rydb.) Isely—Tampa prairie clover
- Dalea aenigma Barneby
- Dalea albiflora A. Gray—whiteflower prairie clover
- Dalea analiliana Spellenb.
- Dalea ananassa Barneby
- Dalea antana J.F. Macbr.
- Dalea arenicola (Wemple) B.L. Turner
- Dalea aurea C. Fraser—golden prairie clover
- Dalea austrotexana B.L.Turner
- Dalea ayavacensis Kunth
  - var. ayavacensis Kunth
  - var. killipii (J.F.Macbr.) Barneby
- Dalea azurea (Phil.) Reiche
- Dalea bacchantum Barneby
- Dalea bartonii Barneby—Warnock's prairie clover, Cox's dalea
- Dalea bicolor Willd.—silver prairie clover
  - var. argyrea (A.Gray) Barneby
  - var. bicolor Willd.
  - var. canescens (M.Martens & Galeotti) Barneby
  - var. naviculifolia (Hemsl.) Barneby
  - var. orcuttiana Barneby
- Dalea boliviana Britton
- Dalea boraginea Barneby
- Dalea botterii (Rydb.) Barneby
- Dalea brachystachya A. Gray—Fort Bowie prairie clover
- Dalea brandegei (Rose) Bullock
- Dalea caeciliae Harms
- Dalea cahaba J.R.Allison—Cahaba prairie clover
- Dalea candida Willd.—white prairie clover, white tassel-flower
  - var. candida Willd.
  - var. oligophylla (Torr.) Shinners
- Dalea capitata S. Watson
  - var. capitata S. Watson
  - var. quinqueflora (Brandegee) Barneby
- Dalea carnea (Michx.) Poir.—whitetassels
  - var. albida (Torr. & A. Gray) Barneby
  - var. carnea (Michx.) Poir.
- Dalea carthagenensis (Jacq.) J.F. Macbr.—Cartagena prairie clover
  - var. barbata (Oerst.) Barneby
  - var. brevis (J.F.Macbr.) Barneby
  - var. capitulata (Rydb.) Barneby
  - var. carthagenensis (Jacq.) J.F. Macbr.
  - var. floridana (Rydb.) Barneby
  - var. pilocarpa (Rusby) Barneby
  - var. portoricana Barneby
  - var. trichocalyx (Ulbr.) Barneby
- Dalea ceciliana—Cecilia's prairie clover
- Dalea choanosema Barneby
- Dalea chrysophylla Barneby
- Dalea cinnamomea Barneby
- Dalea cliffortiana Willd.
- Dalea coerulea (L. f.) Schinz & Thell.
  - var. coerulea (L. f.) Schinz & Thell.
  - var. longispicata (Ulbr.) Barneby
- Dalea compacta Spreng.—compact prairie clover
  - var. compacta Spreng.
  - var. pubescens (A.Gray) Barneby
- Dalea confusa (Rydb.) Barneby
- Dalea cora Barneby
- Dalea crassifolia Hemsl.
- Dalea cuatrecasasii Barneby
- Dalea cuniculo-caudata Paul G. Wilson
- Dalea cyanea Greene
- Dalea cylindrica Hook.
  - var. cylindrica Hook.
  - var. haenkeana Barneby
  - var. nova (Ulbr.) Barneby
  - var. sulfurea (Ulbr.) Barneby
- Dalea cylindriceps Barneby—Andean prairie clover
- Dalea daucosma Barneby
- Dalea dipsacea Barneby
- Dalea dispar C.V. Morton
- Dalea dorycnoides DC.
- Dalea elata Hook. & Arn.
- Dalea elegans Hook. & Arn.
  - var. elegans Hook. & Arn.
  - var. onobrychioides (Griseb.) Barneby
- Dalea emarginata (Torr. & A. Gray) Shinners—wedgeleaf prairie clover
- Dalea enneandra Nutt.—nine-anther prairie clover
- Dalea eriophylla S. Watson
- Dalea erythrorhiza Greenm.
- Dalea escobilla Barneby
- Dalea exigua Barneby—Chihuahuan prairie clover
- Dalea exilis DC.
- Dalea exserta (Rydb.) Gentry—Mexican prairie clover
- Dalea feayi (Chapman) Barneby—Feay's prairie clover
- Dalea fieldii (J.F. Macbr.) J.F. Macbr.
- Dalea filiciformis C.B.Rob. & Greenm.
- Dalea filiformis A. Gray—Sonoran prairie clover
- Dalea flavescens (S. Watson) S.L.Welsh ex Barneby—Canyonlands prairie clover
- Dalea foliolosa (Aiton) Barneby
  - var. citrina (Rydb.) Barneby
  - var. foliolosa (Aiton) Barneby
- Dalea foliosa (A. Gray) Barneby—leafy prairie clover
- Dalea formosa Torr.—featherplume
- Dalea frutescens A. Gray—black prairie clover, black dalea
- Dalea galbina (J.F. Macbr.) J.F. Macbr.
- Dalea gattingeri (A. Heller) Barneby—purpletassels
- Dalea glumacea Barneby
- Dalea grayi (Vail) L.O. Williams—Gray's prairie clover
- Dalea greggii A. Gray—Gregg's prairie clover
- Dalea gymnocodon Barneby
- Dalea gypsophila Barneby
- Dalea hallii A. Gray
- Dalea hegewischiana Steud.
- Dalea hemsleyana (Rose) Bullock
- Dalea hintonii Sandwith
- Dalea holwayi Rose
- Dalea hospes (Rose) Bullock
- Dalea humifusa Benth.
- Dalea humilis G. Don
- Dalea illustris Barneby
- Dalea insignis Hemsl.
- Dalea isidorii Barneby
- Dalea jamesii (Torr.) Torr. & A. Gray—James' prairie clover
- Dalea jamesonii (J.F. Macbr.) J.F. Macbr.
- Dalea juncea (Rydb.) Wiggins
- Dalea kuntzei Kuntze
- Dalea lachnantha S.Schauer
- Dalea lachnostachya A.Gray
- Dalea lachnostachys A. Gray—glandleaf prairie clover
- Dalea lamprostachya Barneby
- Dalea lanata Spreng.—woolly prairie clover, woolly dalea
  - var. lanata Spreng.
  - var. terminalis (M.E.Jones) Barneby
- Dalea laniceps Barneby—woollyhead prairie clover
- Dalea lasiathera A. Gray—purple dalea
- Dalea leporina (Aiton) Bullock—foxtail prairie clover, hare's foot dalea
- Dalea leptostachya DC.
- Dalea leucosericea (Rydb.) Standl. & Steyerm.
- Dalea leucostachya A. Gray
  - var. eysenhardtioides (Hemsl.) Barneby
  - var. leucostachya A. Gray
- Dalea luisana S. Watson
- Dalea lumholtzii C.B.Rob. & Fernald—Lumholtz's prairie clover
- Dalea lutea (Cav.) Willd.
  - var. gigantea (Rydb.) Barneby
  - var. lutea (Cav.) Willd.
- Dalea macrotropis S. Schauer
- Dalea mcvaughii Barneby
- Dalea melantha S. Schauer
- Dalea mexiae Barneby
- Dalea minutifolia (Rydb.) Harms
- Dalea mixteca Barneby
- Dalea mollis Benth.—hairy prairie clover
- Dalea mollissima (Rydb.) Munz—soft prairie clover
- Dalea moquehuana J.F. Macbr.
- Dalea mucronata DC.
- Dalea multiflora (Nutt.) Shinners—roundhead prairie clover
- Dalea myriadenia Ulbr.
- Dalea nana A. Gray—dwarf prairie clover
  - var. carnescens (Rydb.) Kearney & Peebles
  - var. nana A. Gray
- Dalea nelsonii (Rydb.) Barneby
- Dalea nemaphyllidia Barneby
- Dalea neomexicana (A. Gray) Cory—downy prairie clover, New Mexico dalea
  - var. longipila (Rydb.) Barneby
  - var. neomexicana (A. Gray) Cory
- Dalea nobilis Barneby
- Dalea obovata (Torr. & A. Gray) Shinners
- Dalea obovatifolia Ortega
  - var. obovatifolia Ortega
  - var. uncifera (Schltdl. & Cham.) Barneby
- Dalea obreniformis (Rydb.) Barneby
- Dalea onobrychis DC.
- Dalea ornata (Hook.) Eaton & Wright—Blue Mountain prairie clover, handsome prairie clover
- Dalea parrasana Brandegee
- Dalea pazensis Rusby
- Dalea pectinata Kunth
- Dalea pennellii (J.F. Macbr.) J.F. Macbr.
- Dalea phleoides (Torr. & A. Gray) Shinners—slimspike prairie clover
  - var. microphylla (Torr. & A.Gray) Barneby
  - var. phleoides (Torr. & A. Gray) Shinners
- Dalea pinetorum Gentry
- Dalea pinnata (J.F. Gmel.) Barneby—summer farewell
- Dalea piptostegia Barneby
- Dalea plantaginoides Barneby
- Dalea pogonathera A. Gray—bearded prairie clover
  - var. pogonathera A. Gray
  - var. walkerae (Tharp & F. A. Barkley) B. L. Turner
- Dalea polygonoides A. Gray—sixweeks prairie clover
- Dalea polystachya (Sessé & Moc.) Barneby
- Dalea pringlei A. Gray—Pringle's prairie clover
- Dalea prostrata Ortega
- Dalea pseudocorymbosa A.E.Estrada & Villarreal
- Dalea pulchella G. Don
- Dalea pulchra Gentry—Santa Catalina prairie clover
- Dalea purpurea Vent.—purple prairie clover, violet dalea
- Dalea purpusii Brandegee
- Dalea quercetorum Standl. & L.O. Williams
- Dalea radicans S. Watson
- Dalea reclinata (Cav.) Willd.
- Dalea reverchonii (S. Watson) Shinners
- Dalea revoluta S. Watson
- Dalea rubrolutea Barneby
- Dalea rubescens S.Watson
- Dalea rupertii A.E. Estrada, Villarreal & M. González
- Dalea rzedowskii Barneby
- Dalea sabinalis (S. Watson) Shinners—sabinal prairie clover
- Dalea saffordii (Rose) Bullock
- Dalea scandens (Mill.) R.T. Clausen—low prairie clover
  - var. occidentalis (Rydb.) Barneby
  - var. paucifolia (J.M.Coult.) Barneby
  - var. scandens (Mill.) R.T. Clausen
  - var. vulneraria (Oerst.) Barneby
- Dalea scariosa S. Watson—Albuquerque prairie clover
- Dalea schiblii Medina & M. Sousa
- Dalea searlsiae (A. Gray) Barneby—Searls' prairie clover
- Dalea sericea Lag.
- Dalea sericocalyx (Rydb.) L. Riley
- Dalea similis Hemsl.
- Dalea simulatrix Barneby
- Dalea smithii (J.F. Macbr.) J.F. Macbr.
- Dalea sousae Barneby
- Dalea strobilacea Barneby
- Dalea tapacariensis Kuntze
- Dalea tentaculoides Gentry—Gentry's indigobush
- Dalea tenuicaulis Hook. f.
- Dalea tenuifolia (A. Gray) Shinners—slimleaf prairie clover, bigtop dalea
- Dalea tenuis (J.M. Coult.) Shinners—pinkglobe prairie clover
- Dalea thouinii Schrank
- Dalea tinctoria Brandegee
- Dalea tolteca Barneby
- Dalea tomentosa (Cav.) Willd.
  - var. mota Barneby
  - var. psoraleoides (Moric.) Barneby
  - var. tomentosa (Cav.) Willd.
- Dalea transiens Barneby
- Dalea tridactylites Barneby
- Dalea trifoliata Zucc.
- Dalea trochilina Brandegee
- Dalea uniflora (Barneby) G.L. Nesom
- Dalea urceolata Greene—pineforest prairie clover
  - var. lucida (Rydb.) Barneby
  - var. urceolata Greene
- Dalea verna Barneby
- Dalea versicolor Zucc.—oakwoods prairie clover
  - subsp. argyrostachya (Hook. & Arn.) Barneby
  - subsp. glabrescens (Rydb.) Barneby
  - subsp. sessilis (A. Gray) Barneby
  - subsp. versicolor Zucc.
- Dalea villosa (Nutt.) Spreng.—silky prairie clover
  - var. grisea (Torr. & A.Gray) Barneby
  - var. villosa (Nutt.) Spreng.
- Dalea virgata Lag.
- Dalea viridiflora S. Watson
- Dalea weberbaueri Ulbr.
  - var. sericophylla (Ulbr.) Barneby
  - var. weberbaueri Ulbr.
- Dalea wigginsii Barneby
- Dalea wrightii A. Gray—Wright's prairie clover
- Dalea zimapanica S. Schauer

=== Species names with uncertain taxonomic status ===
The status of the following species is unresolved:

- Dalea acutiflora Steud.
- Dalea barbata (Oerst.) Aymard
- Dalea diversicolor Rydb.
- Dalea flavorosea Moc. & Sessé ex DC.
- Dalea goldmani (Rose) L.Riley
- Dalea humboldtiana Velarde
- Dalea hypoglottidea DC.
- Dalea lagopoda St.-Lag.
- Dalea lateripes Moc. & Sessé ex DC.
- Dalea longipes Moc. & Sessé ex DC.
- Dalea lutescens Cervantes ex G. Don
- Dalea megalostachya (Rose) Wiggins
- Dalea melilotoides Moc. & Sessé ex DC.
- Dalea moricandi D. Dietr.
- Dalea mota Gentry
- Dalea multifoliata Phil.f.
- Dalea pendulina Moc. & Sessé ex DC.
- Dalea polyadenia F. Heller
- Dalea scopa Barneby
- Dalea seleriana Harms
- Dalea unguicularis Moc. & Sessé ex DC.
- Dalea unifoliolata C.B.Rob. & Greenm.
- Dalea vernica (Rose) Greenm.
- Dalea watsonii (Rose) Gentry
- Dalea whitingi Kearney & Peebles

== Gallery ==
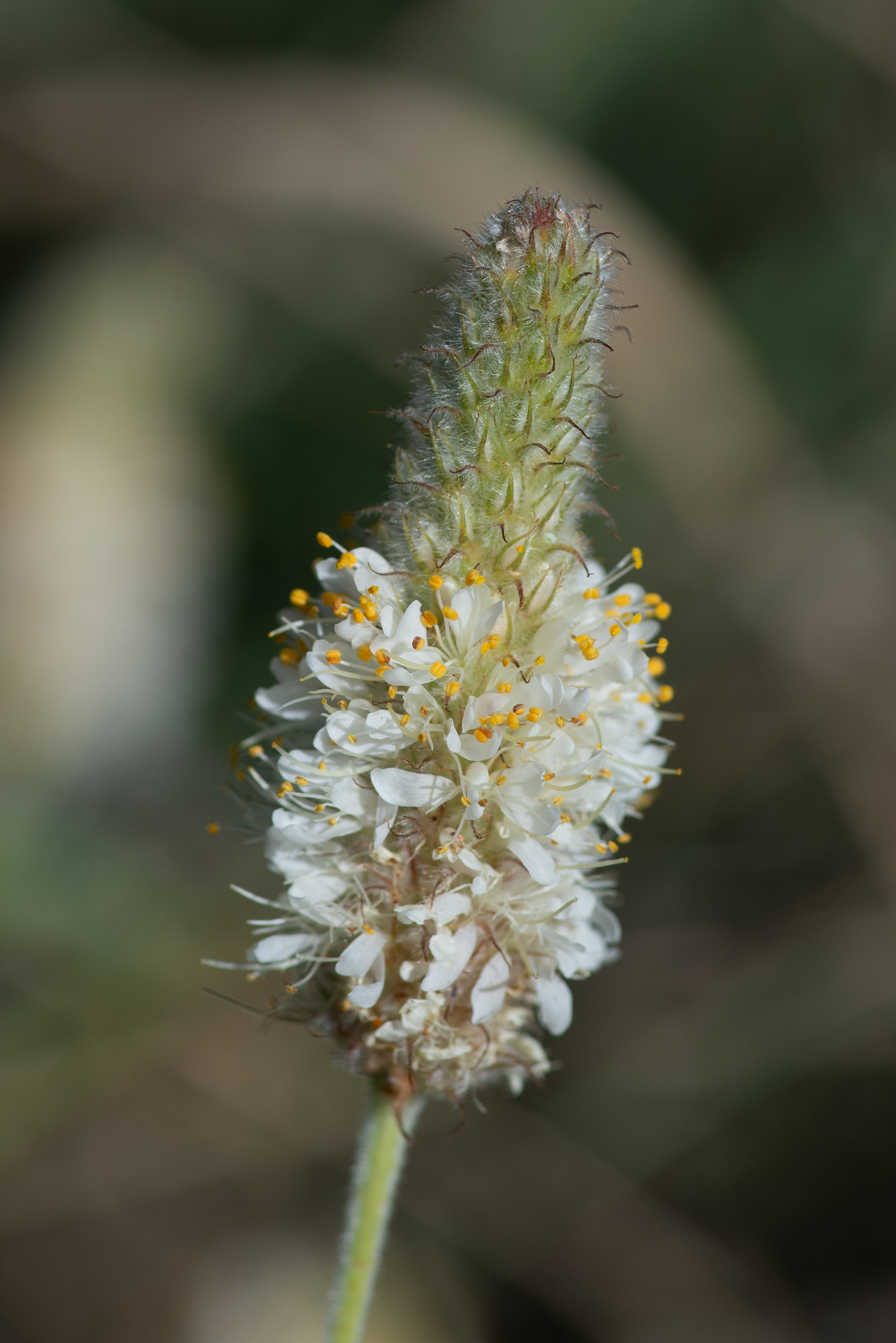
Dalea albiflora

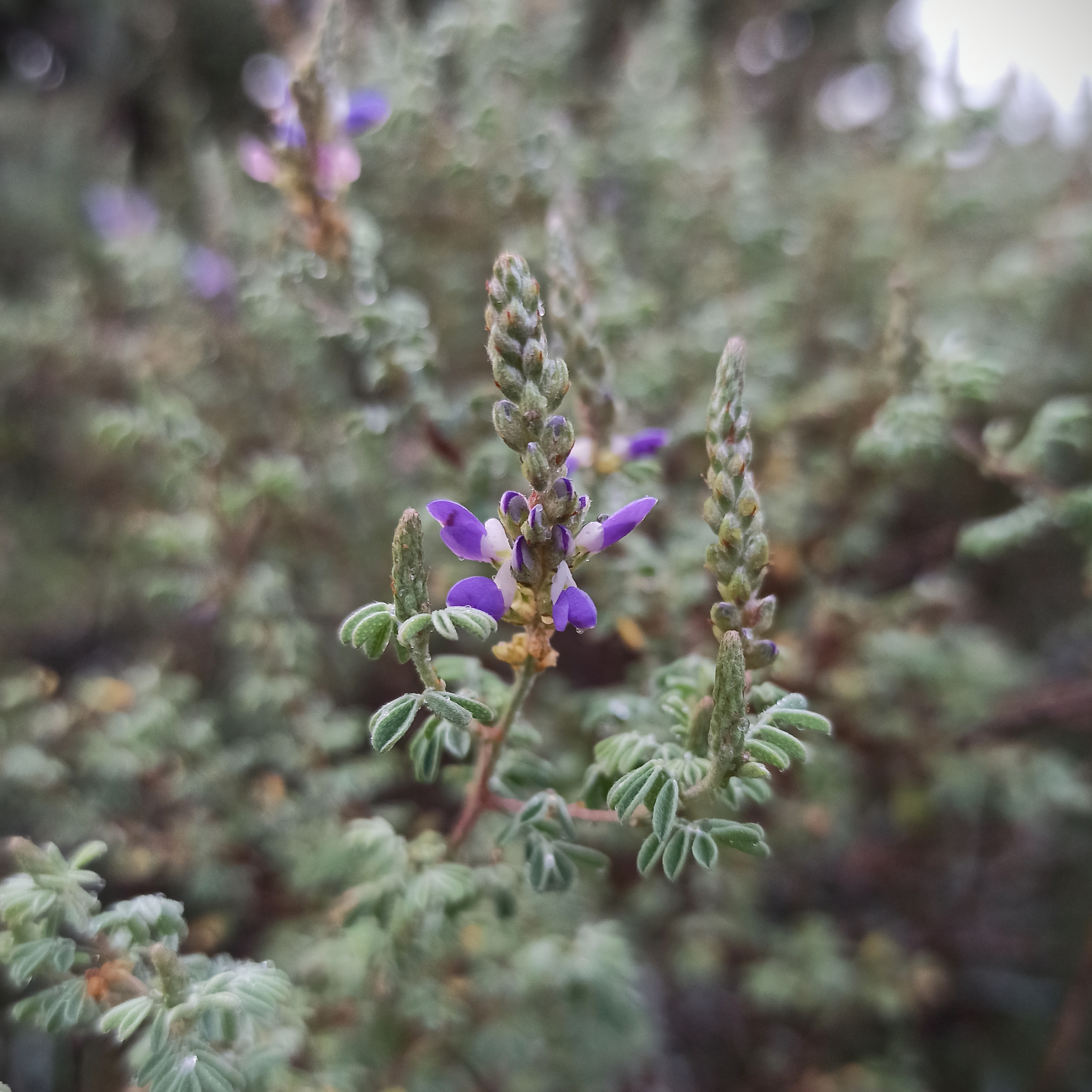
Dalea bicolor

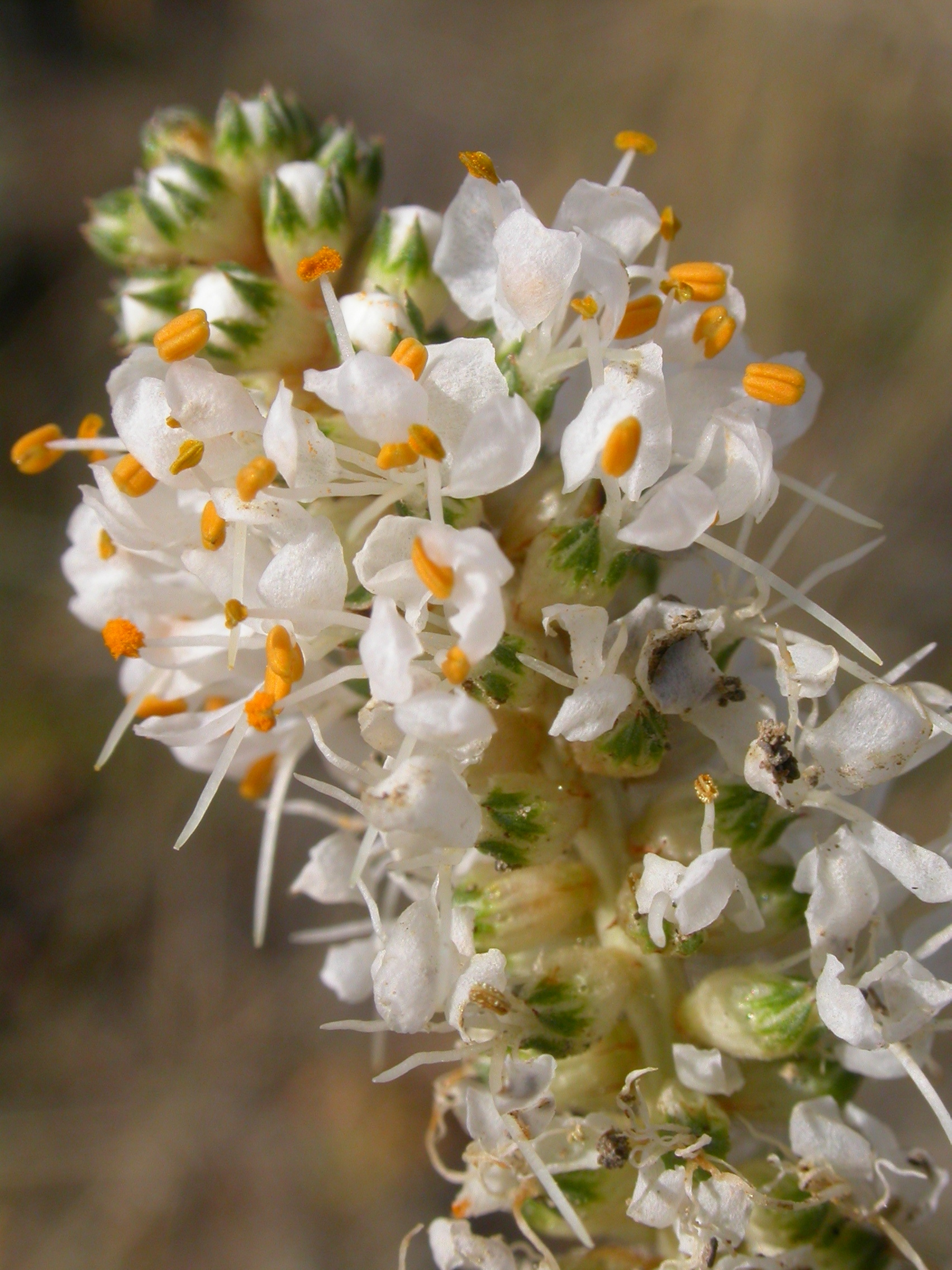
Dalea candida

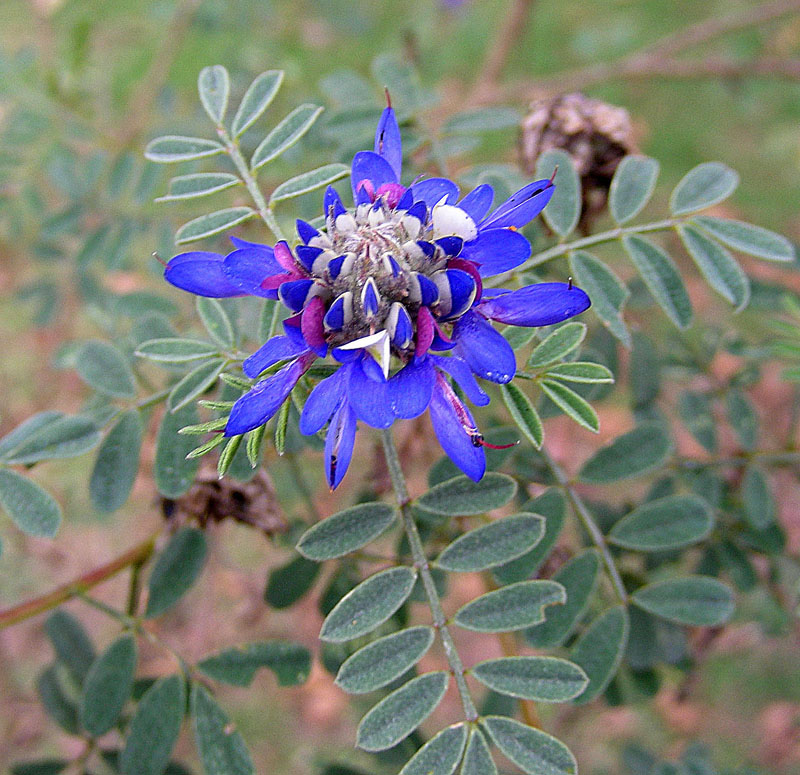
Dalea coerulea

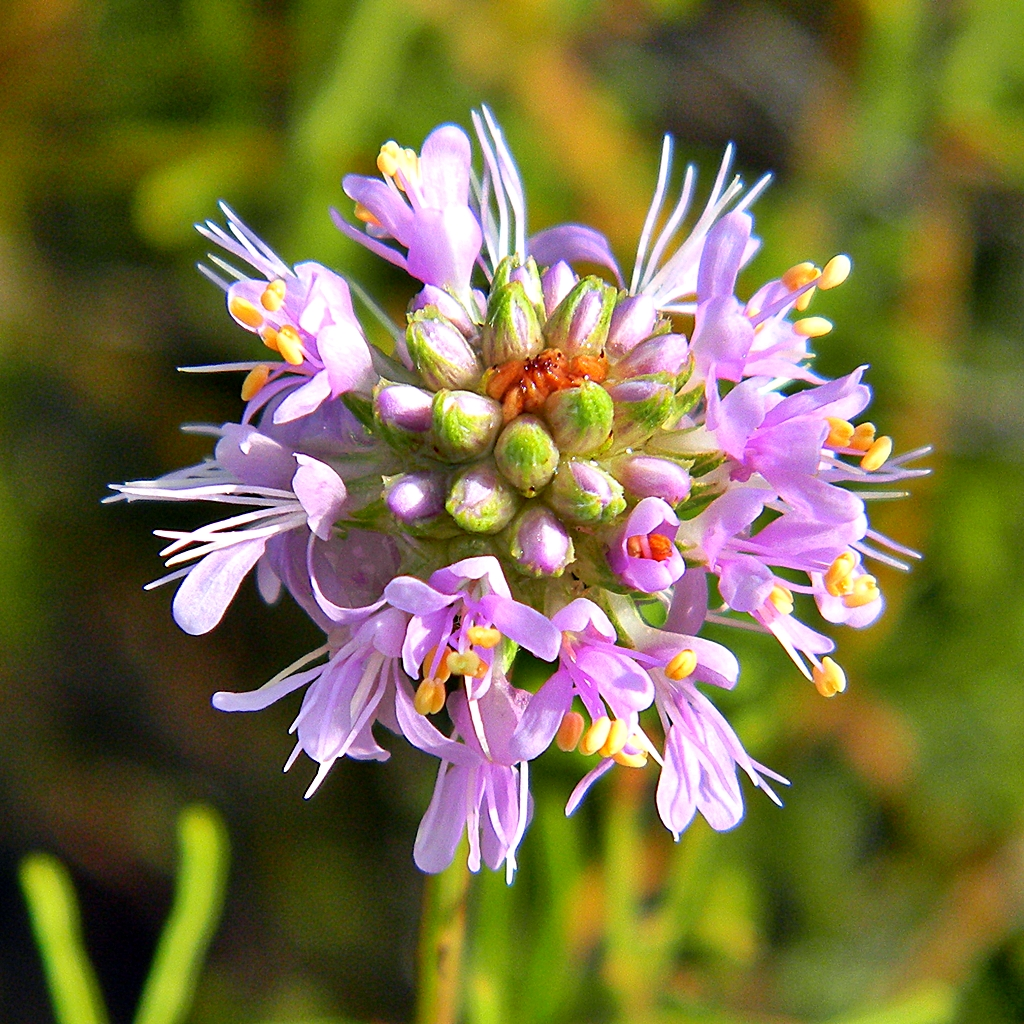
Dalea feayi

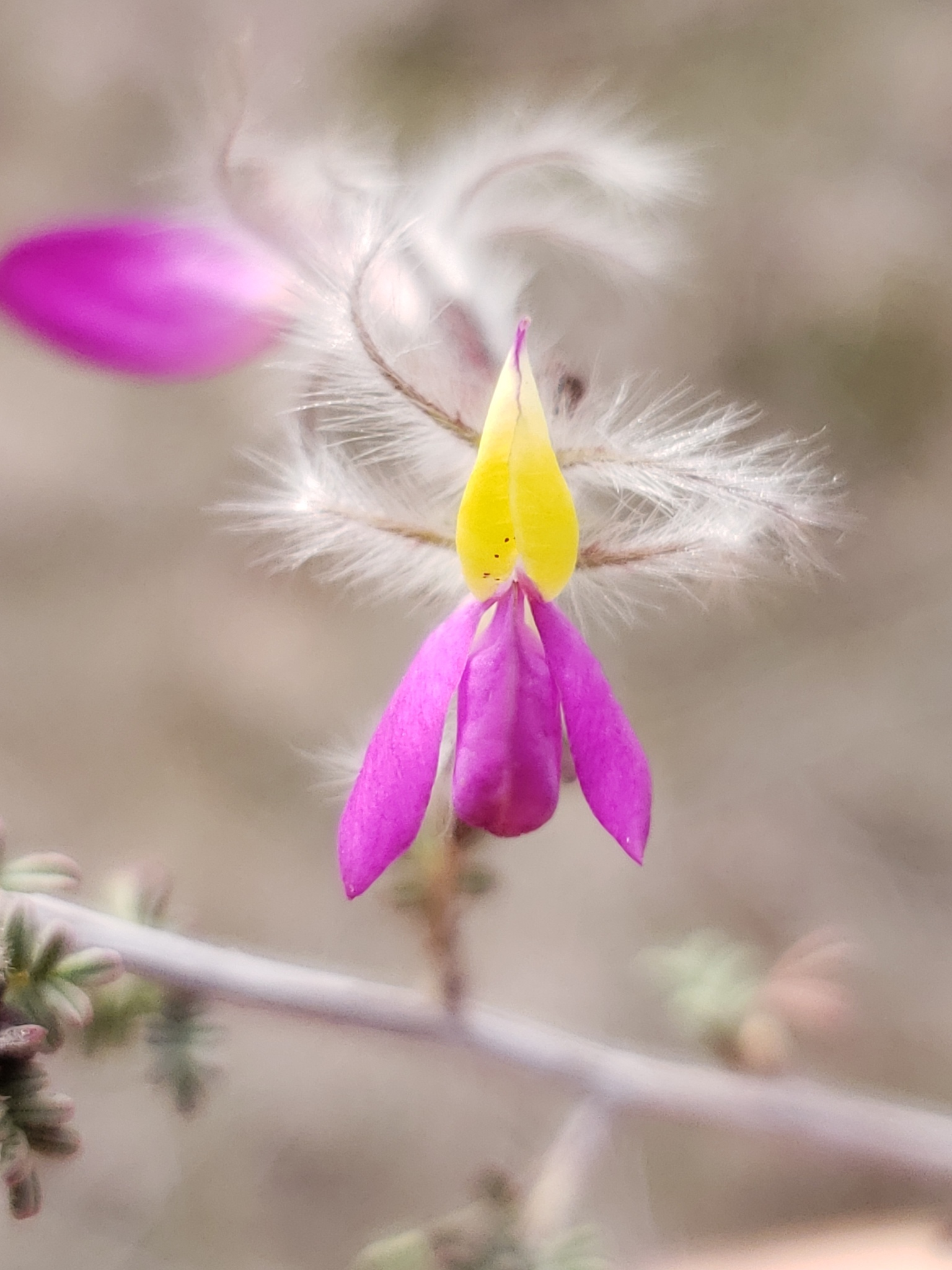
Dalea formosa

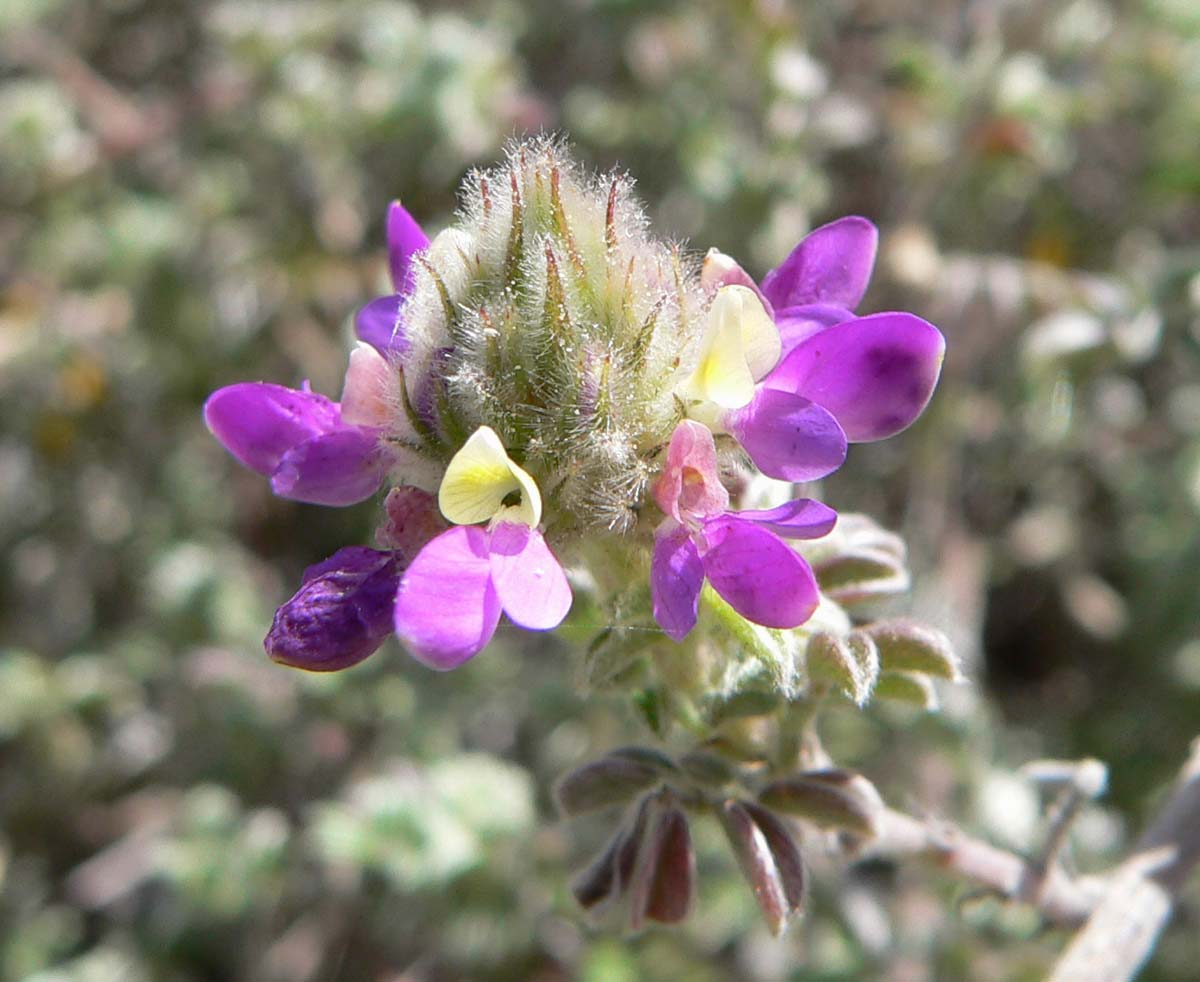
Dalea greggii

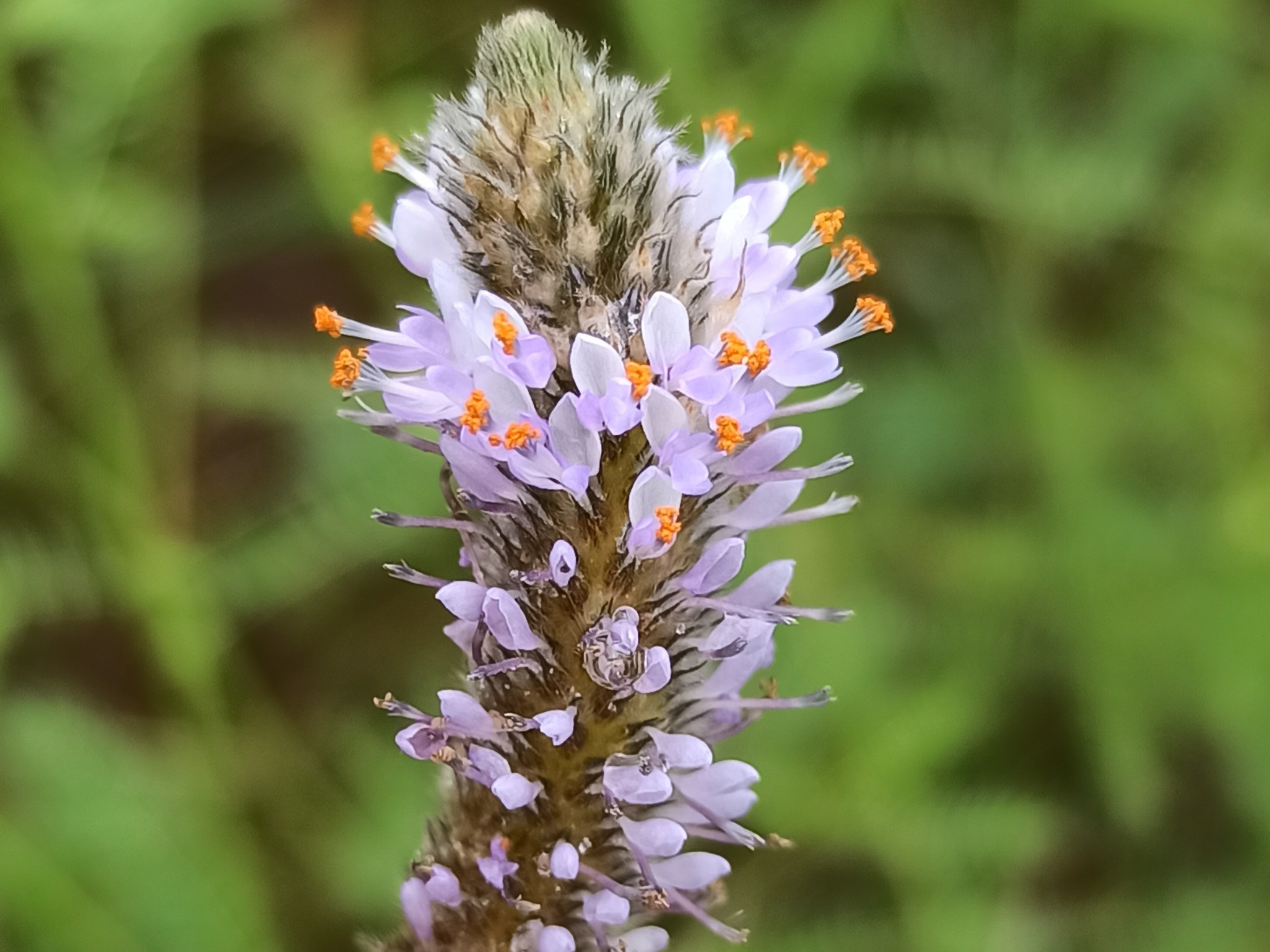
Dalea leporina

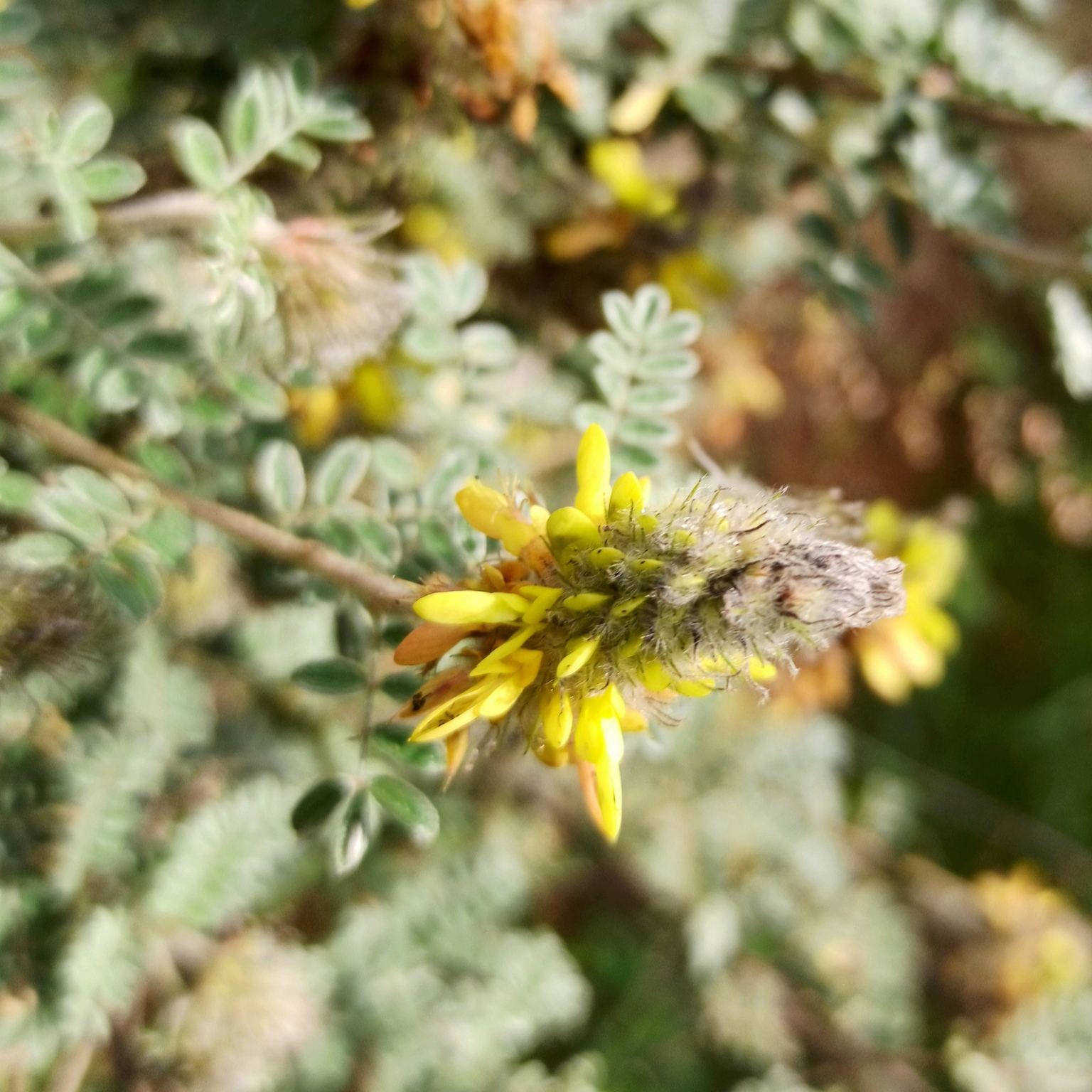
Dalea lutea

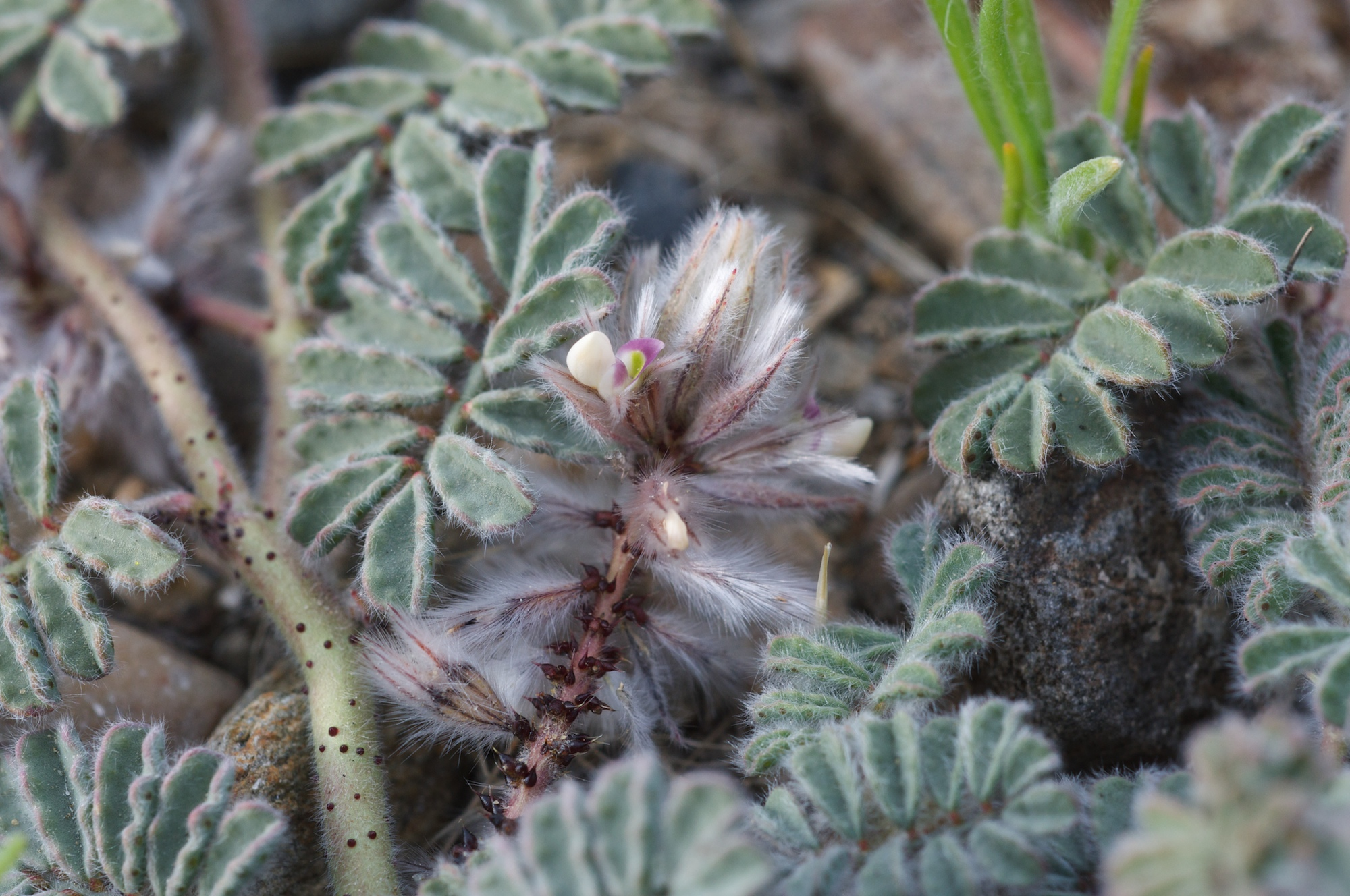
Dalea mollissima

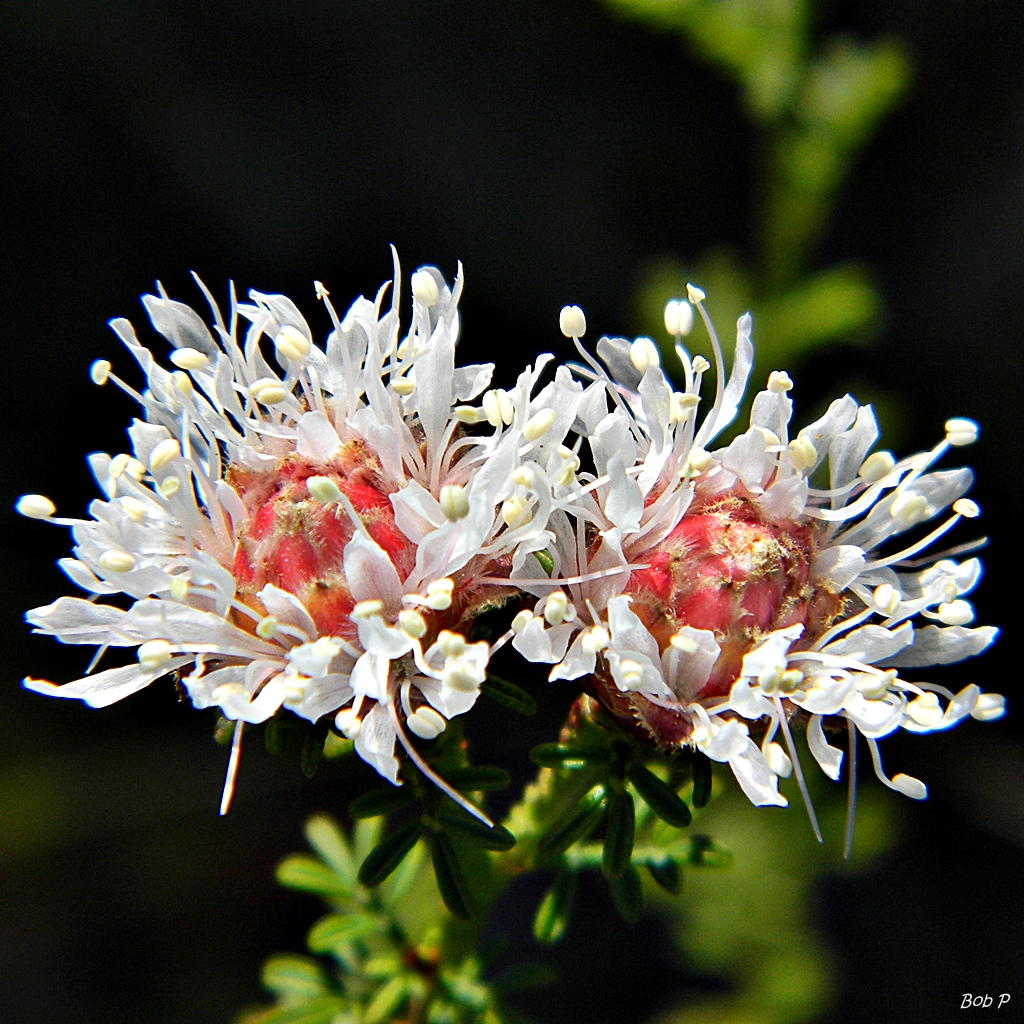
Dalea pinnata

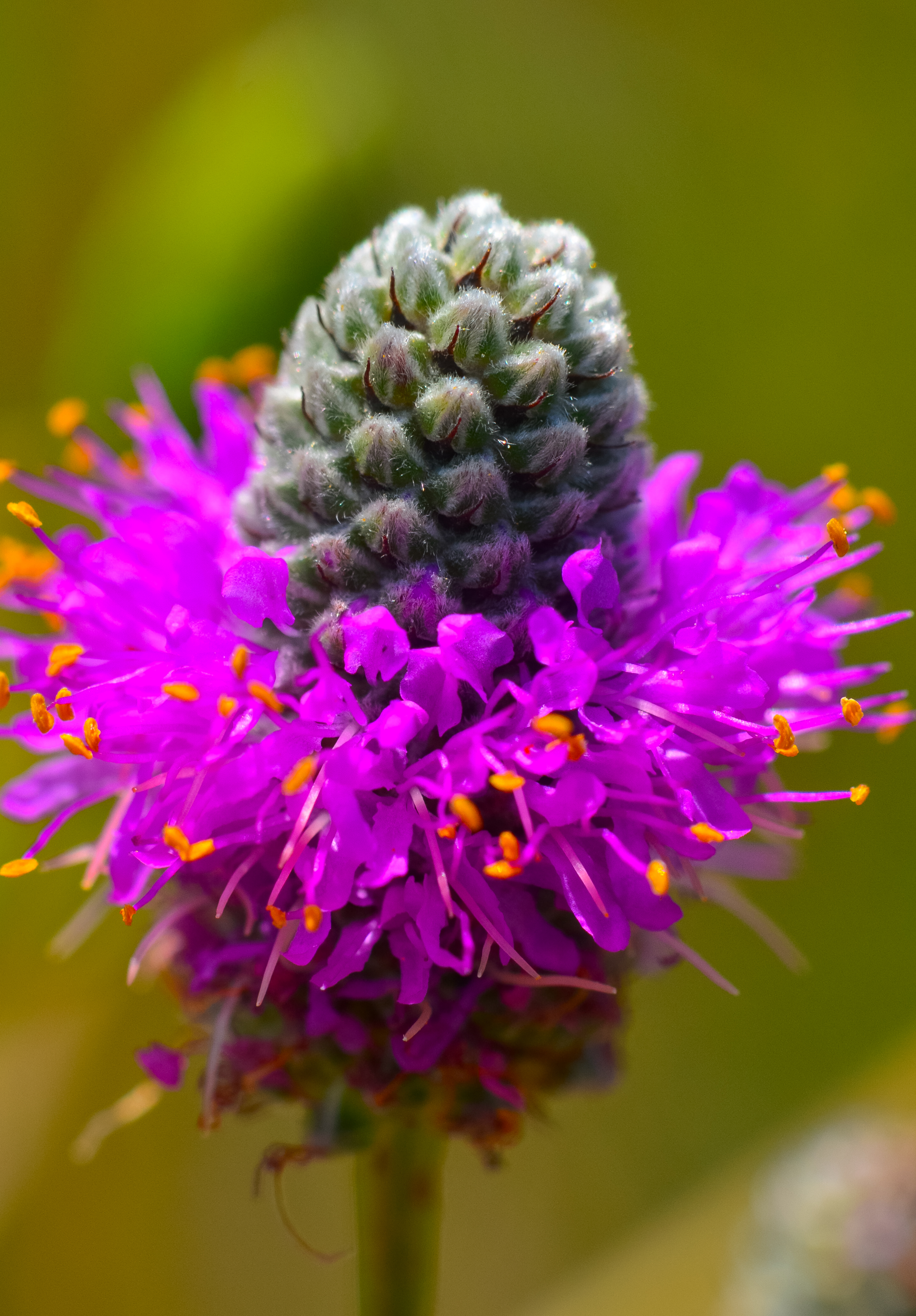
Dalea purpurea

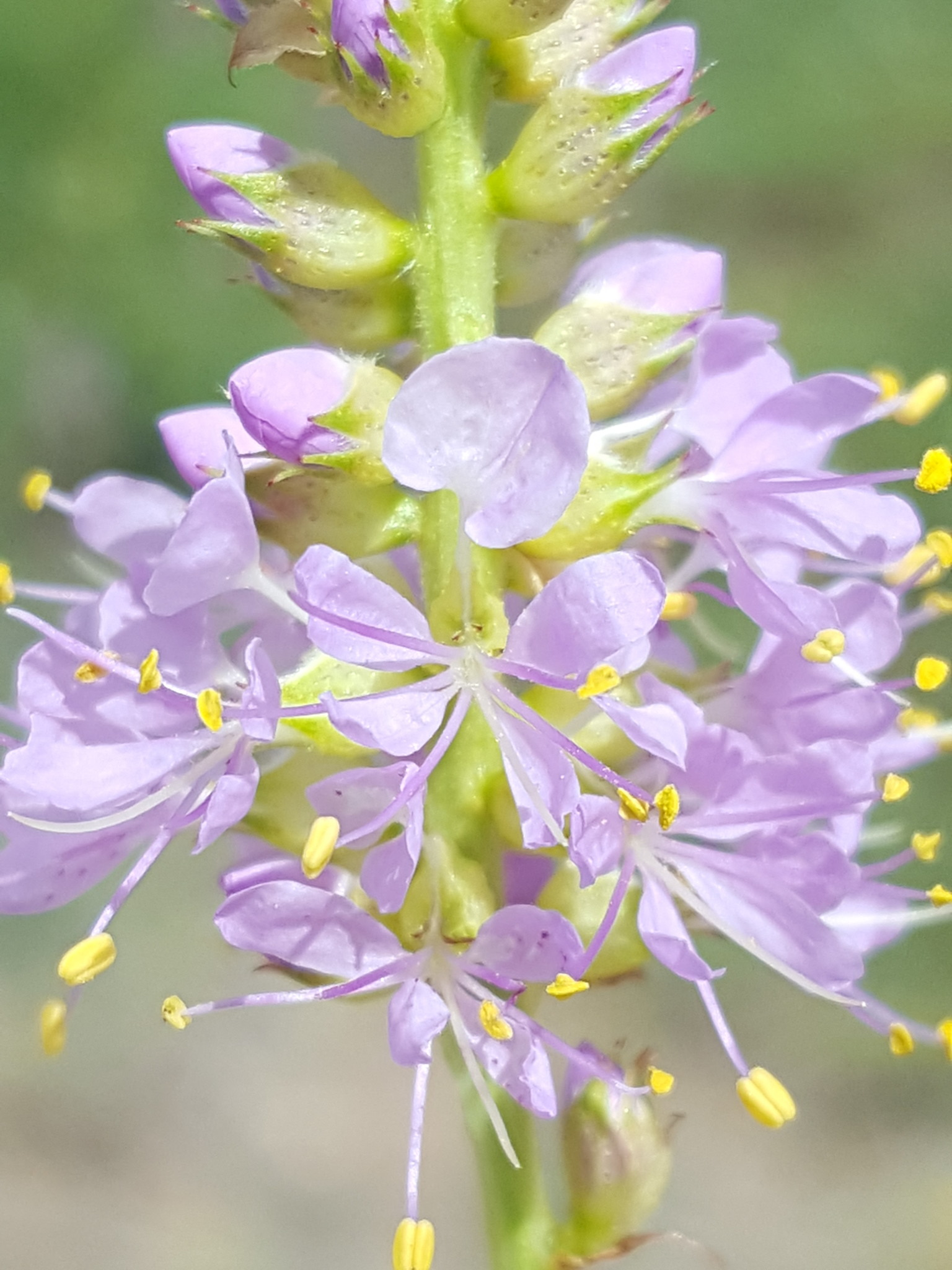
Dalea scariosa

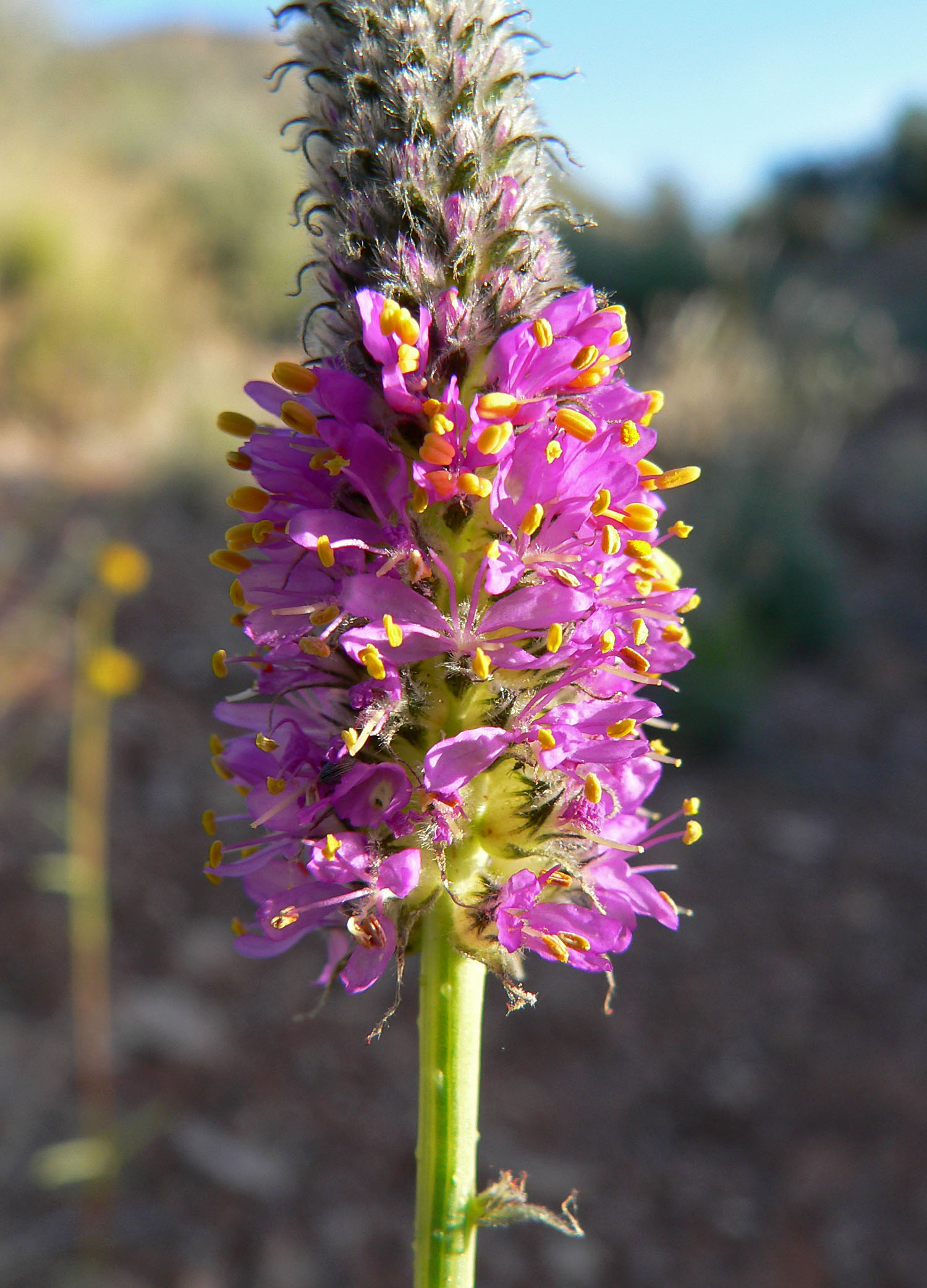
Dalea searlsiae
