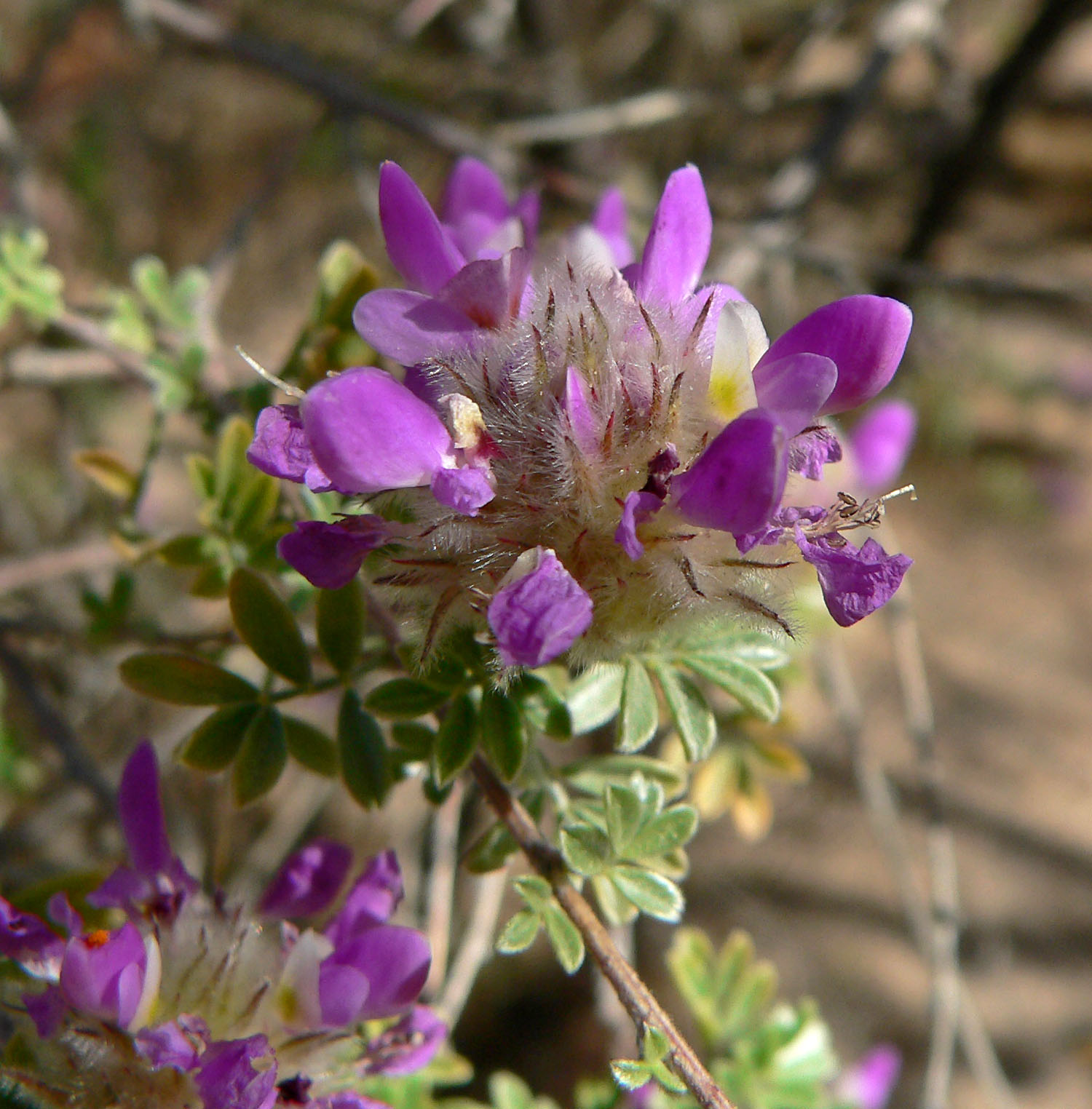

Conservation status
- Vulnerable (NatureServe)

Scientific classification
- Kingdom: Plantae
- Clade: Tracheophytes
- Clade: Angiosperms
- Clade: Eudicots
- Clade: Rosids
- Order: Fabales
- Family: Fabaceae
- Subfamily: Faboideae
- Genus: Dalea
- Species: D. pulchra

Binomial name
- Dalea pulchra Gentry

= Dalea pulchra =

Species of legume

Dalea pulchra, the Santa Catalina prairie clover or indigo bush, is a perennial shrub or subshrub of the subfamily Faboideae in the pea family-(Fabaceae). It is found in the southwestern United States and Northwestern Mexico in the states of Arizona, New Mexico, Sonora, and Chihuahua, in the Madrean sky islands region and associated areas.

Santa Catalina prairie clover can be found in some common resource locations, for example: Ironwood Forest National Monument of southern Arizona. It has deep purple flowers. As a shrub it can grow to 1.2 metres (4 ft) tall.

The Santa Catalina prairie clover has the same name as the sky island mountain range of southeast Arizona, the Santa Catalinas.
