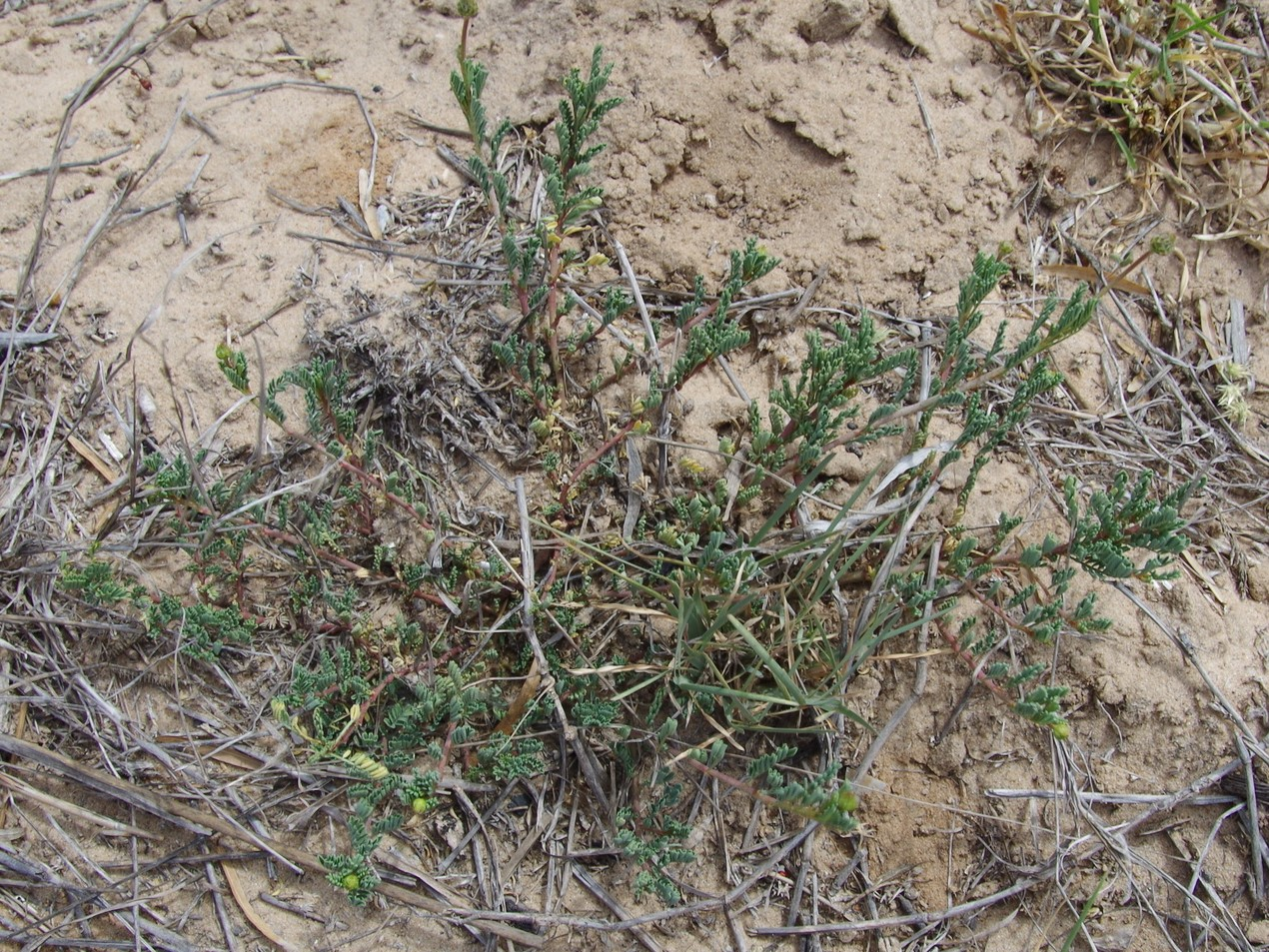

Scientific classification
- Kingdom: Plantae
- Clade: Tracheophytes
- Clade: Angiosperms
- Clade: Eudicots
- Clade: Rosids
- Order: Fabales
- Family: Fabaceae
- Subfamily: Faboideae
- Genus: Dalea
- Species: D. austrotexana

Binomial name
- Dalea austrotexana B.L.Turner
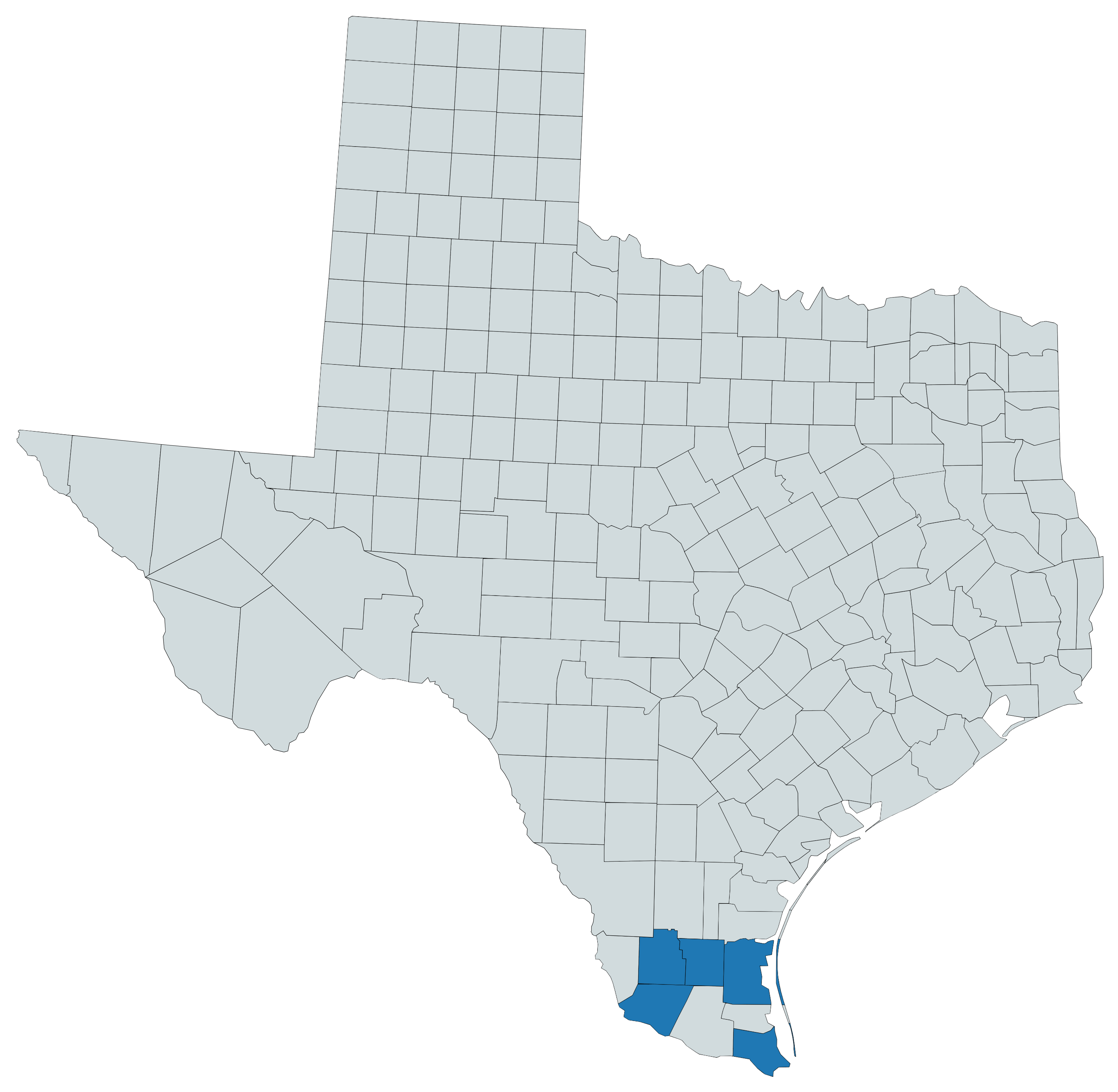

= Dalea austrotexana =

Species of legume

Dalea austrotexana, common names dune dalea and South Texas prairie clover, is a species of plant endemic to southern Texas, US. It is known only from Jim Hogg, Brooks, Cameron, Kenedy and Starr Counties, all at the very southern tip of the state. The species prefers sandy locations such as coastal dunes or sand flats.

Dalea austrotexana is trailing, perennial herb with woody, orange taproots. Stems lay prostrate on the ground. Leaves are odd-pinnate, up to 2 cm (0.8 inches) long. Flowers are pale purple. Fruits are about 2.5 mm (0.1 inch) long, densely hairy. The species appears related to D. lanata; indeed, herbarium specimens had been labeled as such until D. austrotexana was described as a new species in 2006.
