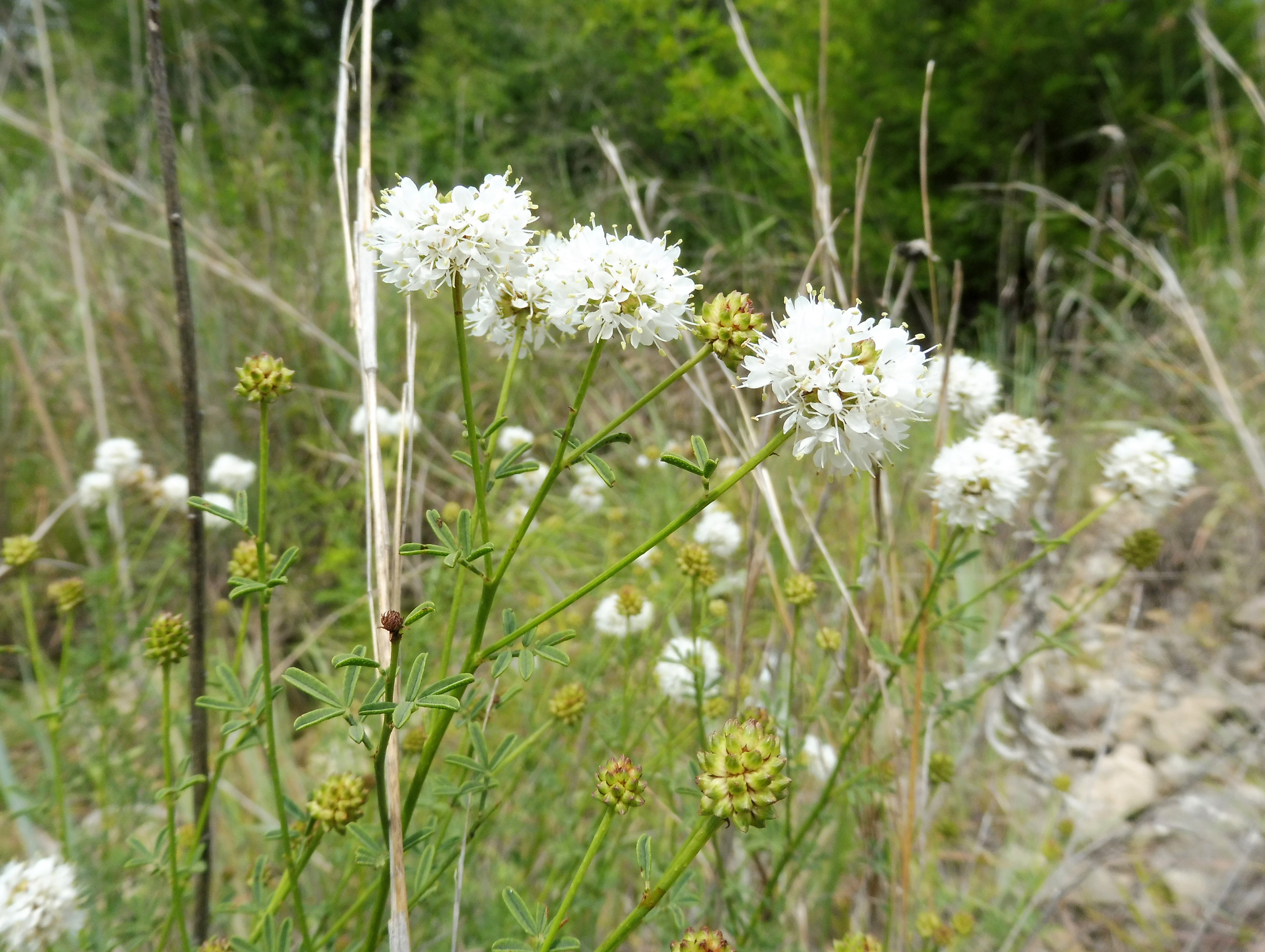

Conservation status
- Secure (NatureServe)

Scientific classification
- Kingdom: Plantae
- Clade: Tracheophytes
- Clade: Angiosperms
- Clade: Eudicots
- Clade: Rosids
- Order: Fabales
- Family: Fabaceae
- Subfamily: Faboideae
- Genus: Dalea
- Species: D. multiflora

Binomial name
- Dalea multiflora (Nutt.) Shinners

Synonyms
- Kuhnistera candida var. multiflora (Nutt.) Rydb. (1895); Kuhnistera multiflora (Nutt.) A.Heller (1894); Petalostemon multiflorus Nutt. (1834)

= Dalea multiflora =

Species of flowering plant in the pea family

Dalea multiflora, commonly called roundhead prairie clover, is a species of flowering plant in the legume family (Fabaceae). It is native to North America, where it is found in Mexico and the United States. In the U.S., it is primarily found in the Great Plains and South Central regions. Its natural habitat is in dry rocky prairies, particularly in limestone soils. It is a conservative species and can be indicative of undisturbed prairie communities.

It is an erect herbaceous perennial, with pinnate-compound leaves. It produces spikes of white flowers in summer. Flowers bloom June to July.
