= Dalea lasiathera =

Scientific classification
- Kingdom: Plantae
- Clade: Tracheophytes
- Clade: Angiosperms
- Clade: Eudicots
- Clade: Rosids
- Order: Fabales
- Family: Fabaceae
- Subfamily: Faboideae
- Genus: Dalea
- Species: D. lasiathera

Binomial name
- Dalea lasiathera A.Gray

Species of legume

Dalea lasiathera, or the purple prairie clover, is a plant from the Southwestern United States.

== Uses ==
Among the Zuni people, the root is chewed as candy, especially by children. Flowers are crushed by hand and sprinkled into meat stew as a flavoring after cooking.
