= Dalea chrysophylla =

Conservation status
- Endangered (IUCN 3.1)

Scientific classification
- Kingdom: Plantae
- Clade: Tracheophytes
- Clade: Angiosperms
- Clade: Eudicots
- Clade: Rosids
- Order: Fabales
- Family: Fabaceae
- Subfamily: Faboideae
- Genus: Dalea
- Species: D. chrysophylla

Binomial name
- Dalea chrysophylla Barneby

Species of legume

Dalea chrysophylla is a species of plant in the family Fabaceae. It is found only in Ecuador. Its natural habitat is subtropical or tropical moist montane forests.
