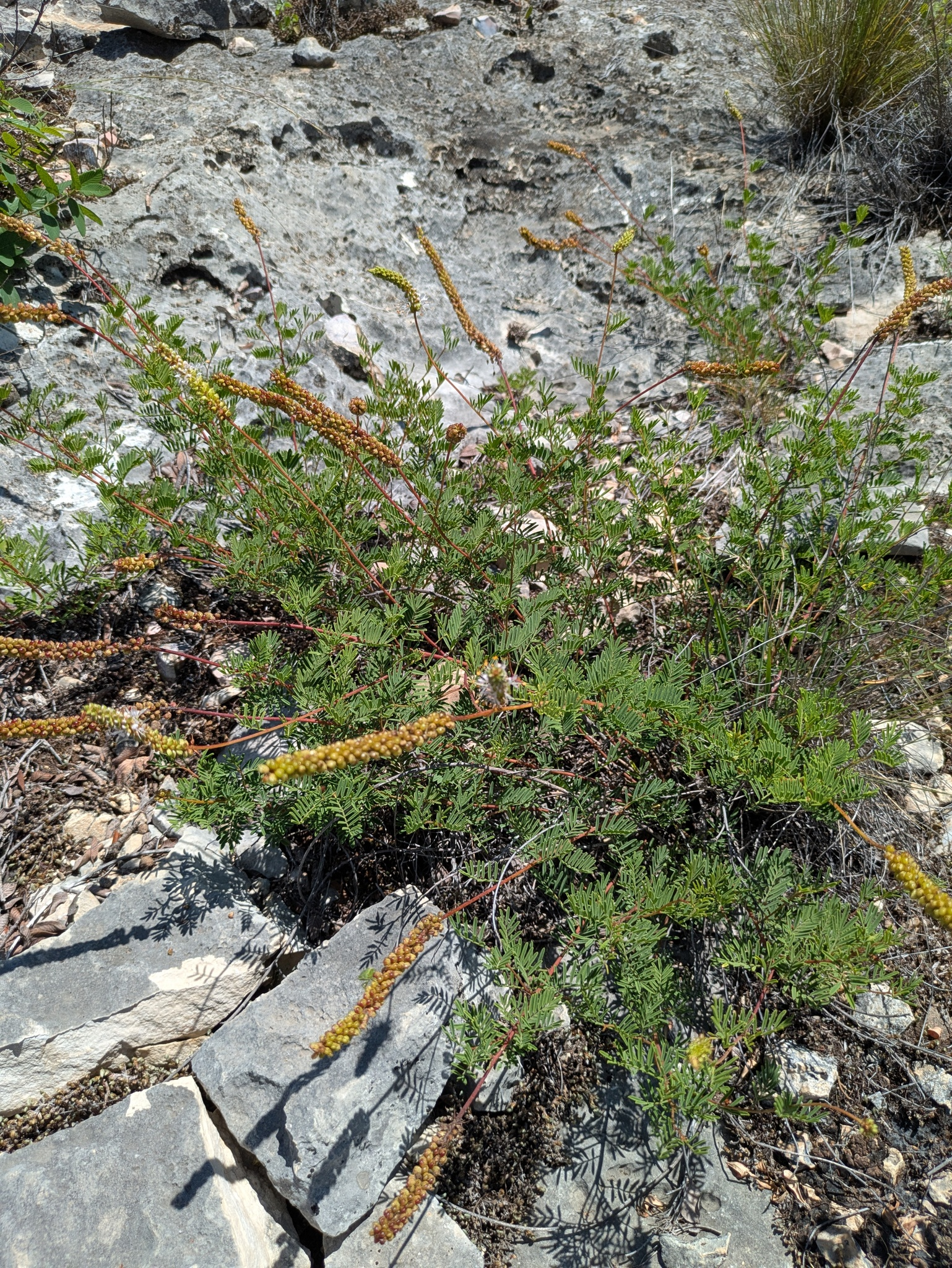

Conservation status
- Critically endangered, possibly extinct (IUCN 3.1)

- Possibly Extinct (NatureServe)

Scientific classification
- Kingdom: Plantae
- Clade: Embryophytes
- Clade: Tracheophytes
- Clade: Spermatophytes
- Clade: Angiosperms
- Clade: Eudicots
- Clade: Rosids
- Order: Fabales
- Family: Fabaceae
- Subfamily: Faboideae
- Genus: Dalea
- Species: D. sabinalis

Binomial name
- Dalea sabinalis (S.Watson) Shinners

Synonyms
- Kuhnistera sabinalis (S.Watson) A.Heller; Petalostemon sabinalis S.Watson

= Dalea sabinalis =

Species of flowering plant

Dalea sabinalis, commonly known as Sabinal prairie clover, is a species of flowering plant in the Dalea genus and Fabaceae family. A perennial subshrub, it has pink flowers. It grows in southwest Texas.

== See also ==
- Sabinal River
