= Dalea nelsonii =

Scientific classification
- Kingdom: Plantae
- Clade: Tracheophytes
- Clade: Angiosperms
- Clade: Eudicots
- Clade: Rosids
- Order: Fabales
- Family: Fabaceae
- Subfamily: Faboideae
- Genus: Dalea
- Species: D. nelsonii

Binomial name
- Dalea nelsonii (Rydb.) Barneby

Synonyms
- Thornbera nelsonii Rydb.

Species of flowering plant

Dalea nelsonii is a species of flowering plant in the Dalea genus and Fabaceae family. It is a perennial. It grows in northeastern Mexico in desert or dry shrubland biomes.

It has blue flowers. It has been described as showy and decorative. Specimens have been collected.

== See also ==
- List of flora of the Sonoran Desert Region by common name
