= Dalea carthagenensis =

Conservation status
- Secure (NatureServe)

Scientific classification
- Kingdom: Plantae
- Clade: Tracheophytes
- Clade: Angiosperms
- Clade: Eudicots
- Clade: Rosids
- Order: Fabales
- Family: Fabaceae
- Subfamily: Faboideae
- Genus: Dalea
- Species: D. carthagenensis

Binomial name
- Dalea carthagenensis (Jacq.) J.F.Macbr.

Species of legume

Dalea carthagenensis is a species of flowering plant in the legume family known by the common name Cartagena prairie-clover. It is native to the Americas, where it is found in South America, Central America, the West Indies, and the US state of Florida.

There are several varieties, including:

- Dalea carthagenensis var. barbata - Mexico, Costa Rica, El Salvador, Guatemala, Honduras, Nicaragua, Panama, Colombia
- Dalea carthagenensis var. carthagenensis - Hispaniola, Curacao, United States Virgin Islands, Venezuela, Colombia
- Dalea carthagenensis var. floridana - Florida
- Dalea carthagenensis var. portoricana - Puerto Rico
