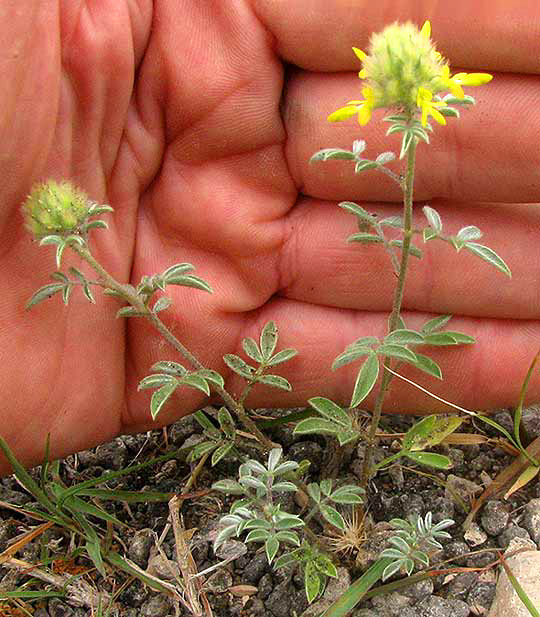
- Dalea rubescens flowering plant

Scientific classification
- Kingdom: Plantae
- Clade: Embryophytes
- Clade: Tracheophytes
- Clade: Spermatophytes
- Clade: Angiosperms
- Clade: Eudicots
- Clade: Rosids
- Order: Fabales
- Family: Fabaceae
- Subfamily: Faboideae
- Genus: Dalea
- Species: D. rubescens

Binomial name
- Dalea rubescens S.Watson

Synonyms
- List: Dalea nana var. elatior Torr. ex Porter & J.M.Coult; Parosela elatior Vail; Parosela rubescens (S.Watson) Vail; Dalea carnescens (Rydb.) Bullock; Dalea nana var. carnescens (Rydb.) Kearney & Peebles; Parosela carnescens Rydb.; Parosela lesueurii Tharp & F.A.Barkley; Parosela whitehouseae Tharp & F.A.Barkley

= Dalea rubescens =

Species of plant

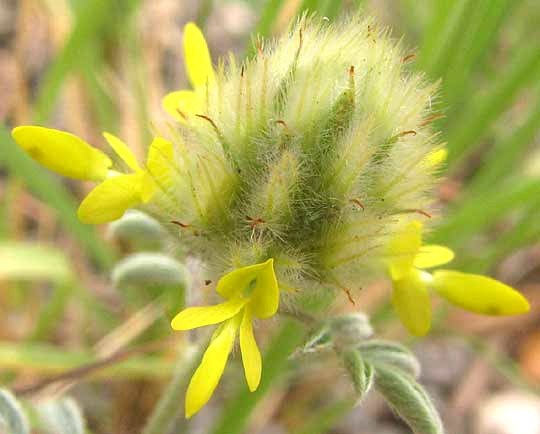
Flowering head

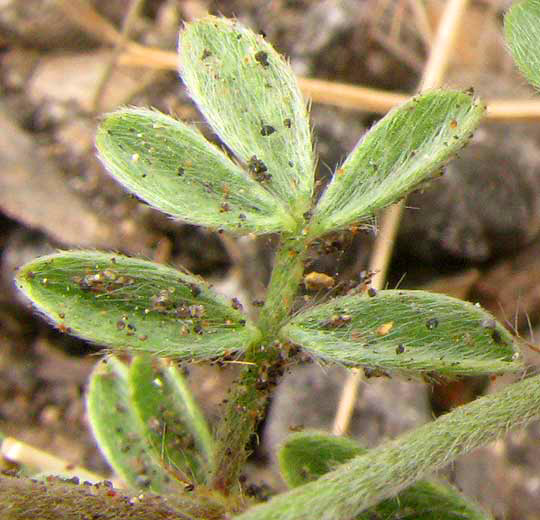
Hairy compound leaf

Dalea rubescens, known by several common names usually reflecting its unusual small size, such as dwarf prairie-clover and dwarf dalea, is a species of wildflower native to the USA and Mexico. It belongs to the family Fabaceae.

== Discription ==
Dalea rubescens is a small herbaceous plant growing as a perennial. Beyond that, here are some good field marks for the species:

- The plant, usually with several diffusely arranged stems up to about 30.5 cm (12 in) tall, is covered with gray or silvery hairs, or trichomes.
- Leaves up to 3 cm (1 1/8 in) are divided into 3–7 leaflets, but usually 5.
- Inflorescences on peduncles up to 3.5 cm (1 3/8 in) long are so compact that their axes are inconspicuous or invisible.
- Individual flowers are subtended by bracts to 5.5 mm (3/16 in) long and 2 mm (1/16 in) wide. The calyx is up to 6.5 mm (1/4 in) long with teeth 2.5 times longer than the tube. Petals are yellow, turning red with age. The top petal is up to 5.5 mm (3/16 in) tall.

Features of the very similar Dalea nana may overlap those Dalea rubescens. However, the former species occurs on acid sands while the later inhabits calcareous substrates.

== Distribution ==
In the southwestern USA, Dalea rubescens occurs in the drier parts of the states of Arizona, New Mexico and Texas. In northern Mexico, it is found in contiguous northern states, especially the northeastern part.

== Habitat ==
In the USA Dalea rubescens inhabits open hillsides and stony plains, mostly below 1,200 m (3,900 ft). Images on this page show an individual encountered among weeds at the very edge of a road's asphalt in a valley in southwestern Texas, at an elevation of about 1,750 m (5,740 ft). In Mexico it occurs in desert scrublands up to 1,600 m (5,200 ft) elevation.

== Of value to pollinators ==
In Texas Dalea rubescens regarded as of special value to native bees.

== Taxonomy ==
In 1874 when Thomas Conrad Porter and John Merle Coulter formally described Dalea rubescens under the basionym Dale nana var. elatior, it was noted that the type specimen was collected along the Purgatory River by "Dr. Bell." Dr. Bell was William Abraham Bell, "of Manitou Springs," (Colorado), as indicated at the front of the publication in which the description was made, in the "Letter to the Geologist-in-Charge." John Coulter was botanist to the United States Geological Survey in the Rocky Mountains from 1872–1875.

In 2026, there was discussion about whether Dalea rubescens was a distinct species or a variety of Dalea nana, the variety carnescens. Both Plants of the World Online and Catalogue of Life accepted the name Dalea rubescens, while others accepted D. nana var. carnescens; for example, the authors of the significant 2025 study on the Fabaceae of Northeastern Mexico. A 2011 study on the matter found that the two taxa are distinct.

== Etymology ==
The genus name Dalea honors the frontiersman, soldier and politician Samuel Dale.

The species name rubescens is the present participle of the Latin rubescere, meaning "to grow red."
