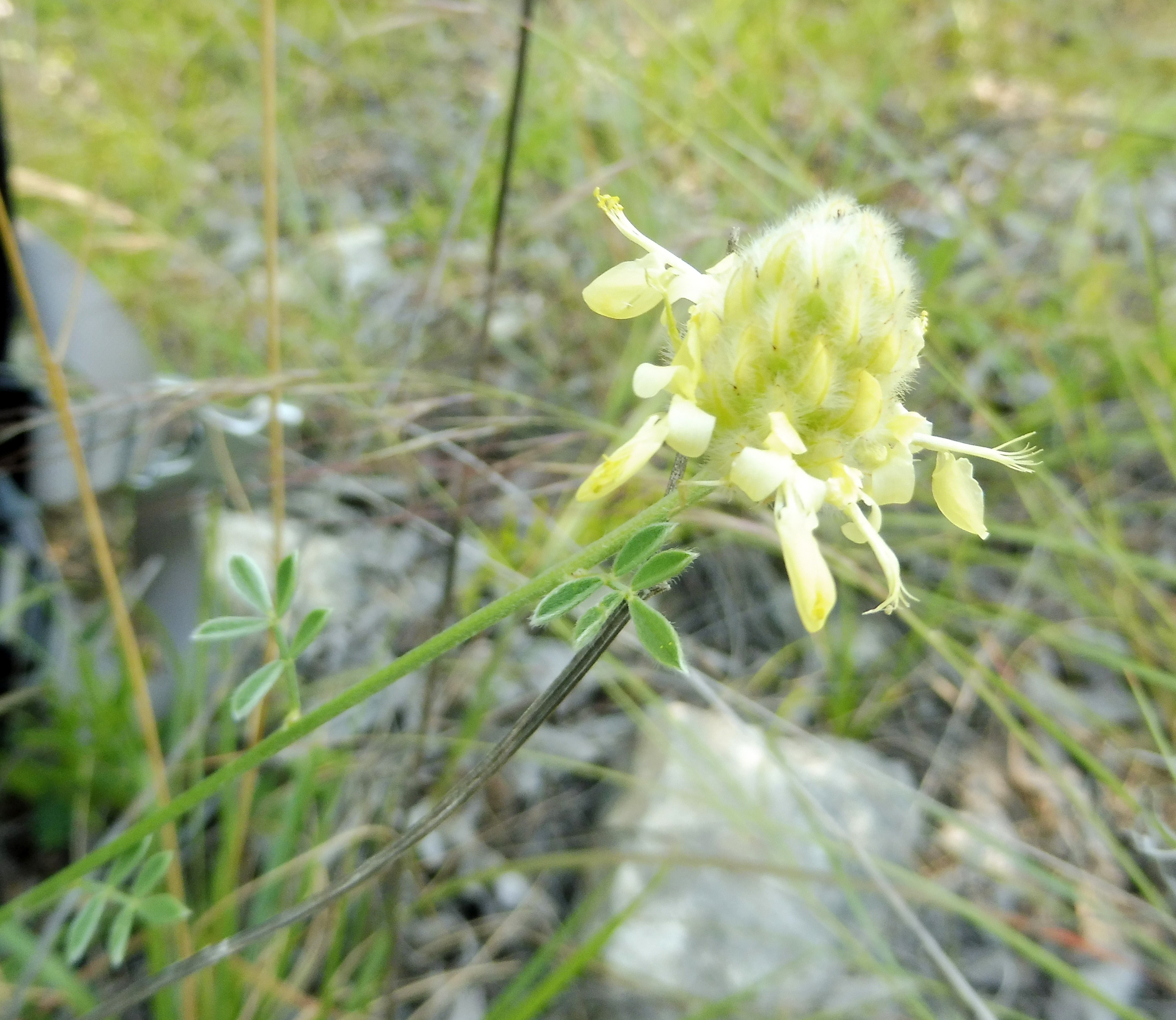

Conservation status
- Secure (NatureServe)

Scientific classification
- Kingdom: Plantae
- Clade: Tracheophytes
- Clade: Angiosperms
- Clade: Eudicots
- Clade: Rosids
- Order: Fabales
- Family: Fabaceae
- Subfamily: Faboideae
- Genus: Dalea
- Species: D. aurea

Binomial name
- Dalea aurea Nutt. ex Pursh

Synonyms
- Cylipogon capitatum Raf.; Petalostemon capitatus DC.; Parosela aurea (Nutt. ex Pursh) Britton; Psoralea aurea (Nutt. ex Pursh) Poir.

= Dalea aurea =

Species of flowering plant in the pea family

Dalea aurea, commonly called golden prairie clover, is a species of flowering plant in the legume family (Fabaceae). It is native to North America, where it is found in the Great Plains and southwestern United States, and in the state of Coahuila, Mexico. Its natural habitat is in silty or gravelly prairies, often over limestone.

It is an herbaceous perennial, with pinnate-compound leaves. It produces yellow flowers in spring and early summer.
