= Dalea elegans =

Scientific classification
- Kingdom: Plantae
- Clade: Tracheophytes
- Clade: Angiosperms
- Clade: Eudicots
- Clade: Rosids
- Order: Fabales
- Family: Fabaceae
- Subfamily: Faboideae
- Genus: Dalea
- Species: D. elegans

Binomial name
- Dalea elegans Hook. & Arn. or Gillies ex Hook. & Arn.

Subspecies
- Dalea elegans var. elegans Hook. & Arn.; Dalea elegans var. onobrychioides (Griseb.) Barneby

Synonyms
- Dalea eosina (J.F. Macbr.) J.F. Macbr.; Dalea onobrychioides Griseb.; Dalea stenophylla Griseb.; Parosela elegans (Gillies ex Hook. & Arn.) J.F. Macbr.; Parosela eosina J.F. Macbr.

Species of legume

Dalea elegans is a species of flowering plants in the legume family, Fabaceae. It is found in Argentina and Bolivia.
