= Dalea compacta =

Scientific classification
- Kingdom: Plantae
- Clade: Tracheophytes
- Clade: Angiosperms
- Clade: Eudicots
- Clade: Rosids
- Order: Fabales
- Family: Fabaceae
- Subfamily: Faboideae
- Genus: Dalea
- Species: D. compacta

Binomial name
- Dalea compacta Spreng.

Species of legume

Dalea compacta, with the common name compact praireclover, is a plant of the Southwestern United States. It is a perennial herb growing up to 2 feet (0.61 metres) tall.

== Uses ==
The Zuni people use the root as a poultice for sores and rashes, and an infusion of it is taken for stomach ache.
