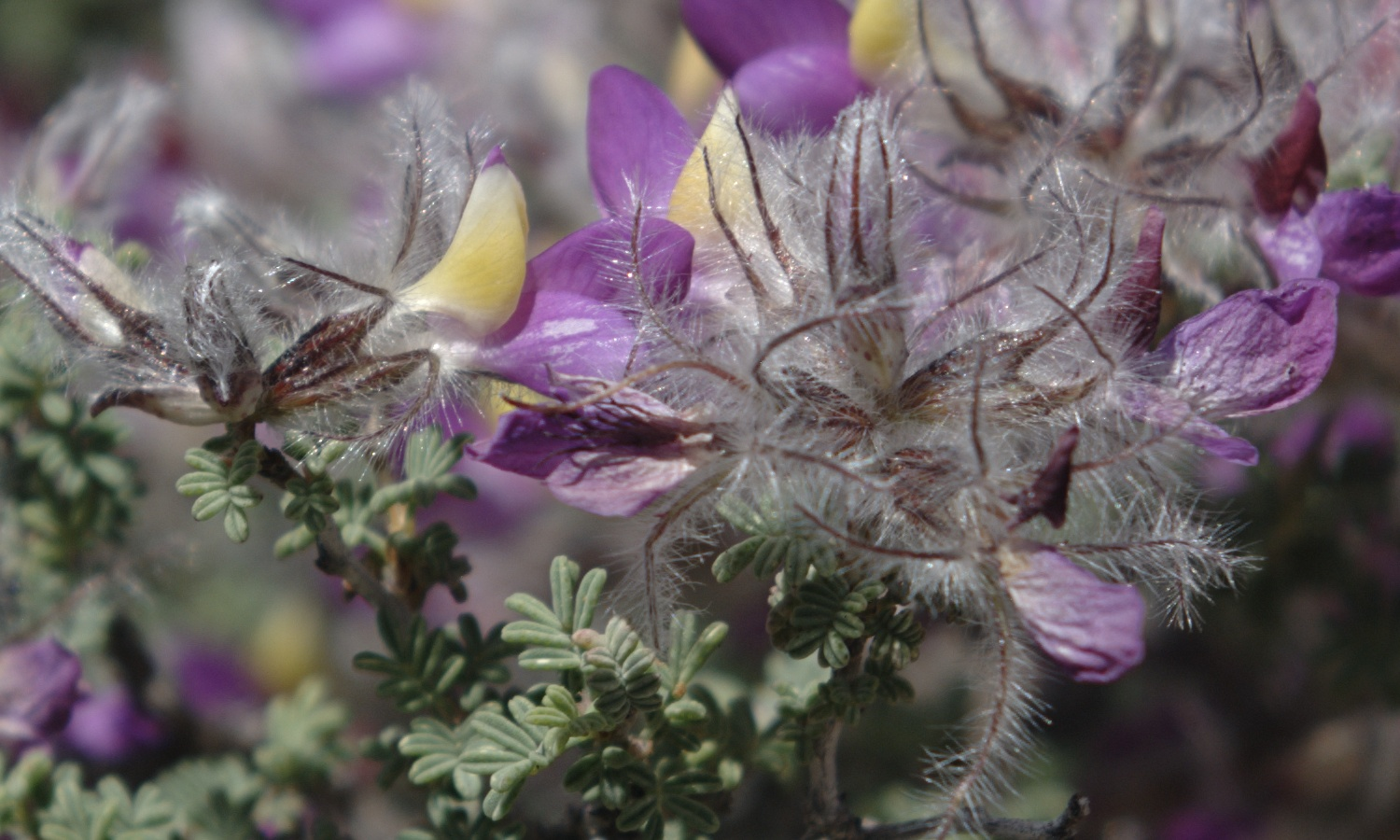

Conservation status
- Secure (NatureServe)

Scientific classification
- Kingdom: Plantae
- Clade: Tracheophytes
- Clade: Angiosperms
- Clade: Eudicots
- Clade: Rosids
- Order: Fabales
- Family: Fabaceae
- Subfamily: Faboideae
- Genus: Dalea
- Species: D. formosa

Binomial name
- Dalea formosa Torr.

Synonyms
- Parosela formosa (Torr.) Vail

= Dalea formosa =

Species of flowering plant in the pea family

Dalea formosa is a semi-evergreen species of flowering plant in the genus Dalea, known by the common names feather dalea and featherplume; it is named for the physician Samuel Dale. The plant is native to the southern United States. It is highly tolerant of heat, cold, and drought. It is favored by honeybees; but of much less use to most wildlife, with the exception of rabbits and deer. Unique to most plants, (Note: Generally, plants expend considerable energy to bloom and that decreases their lifespan or the duration of their bloom, or both; especially in hot regions. Blooming flowers expend considerable energy through nectar production, water loss via transpiration, and respiration of flower parts (Schoen & Ashman, 1994). “Interestingly, flower lifespan is negatively correlated with temperature; the hotter the environment where they bloom, the shorter the period a plant retains them. The phenomenon has been known for a long time,” comments Shoko Sakai, author of the present study.) it blooms all year long (with the occurrence of monsoon rainfall) and also has a long lifespan.
