= Dalea tentaculoides =

Conservation status
- Critically Imperiled (NatureServe)

Scientific classification
- Kingdom: Plantae
- Clade: Embryophytes
- Clade: Tracheophytes
- Clade: Angiosperms
- Clade: Eudicots
- Clade: Rosids
- Order: Fabales
- Family: Fabaceae
- Subfamily: Faboideae
- Genus: Dalea
- Species: D. tentaculoides

Binomial name
- Dalea tentaculoides Gentry

Species of legume

Dalea tentaculoides is a rare species of flowering plant in the legume family known by the common name Gentry's indigobush. It is native to Arizona in the United States, where it is limited to Pima and Santa Cruz Counties. It may occur in adjacent Mexico.

This shrub-like perennial herb may reach two meters in height, but it usually remains smaller. It has compound leaves with several pairs of leaflets. The flowers are rose-purple. The inflorescence is coated in tentacle-like glands. Flowering occurs in spring and again in fall.

This plant grows in canyons in oak and juniper woodland. It grows on floodplains and terraces and is subject to seasonal flooding.

There are only a few occurrences of this plant, some located in the Tohono O'odham Reservation and in the Coronado National Forest.
