= Dalea candida var. oligophylla =

Scientific classification
- Kingdom: Plantae
- Clade: Tracheophytes
- Clade: Angiosperms
- Clade: Eudicots
- Clade: Rosids
- Order: Fabales
- Family: Fabaceae
- Subfamily: Faboideae
- Genus: Dalea
- Species: D. candida
- Variety: D. c. var. oligophylla

Trinomial name
- Dalea candida var. oligophylla (Torr.) Shinners

Synonyms
- Dalea oligophylla (Torr.) Shinners

Variety of legume

Dalea candida var. oligophylla, the western prairie clover, is a perennial plant in the legume family (Fabaceae) found in the Colorado Plateau and Canyonlands region of the southwestern United States.
