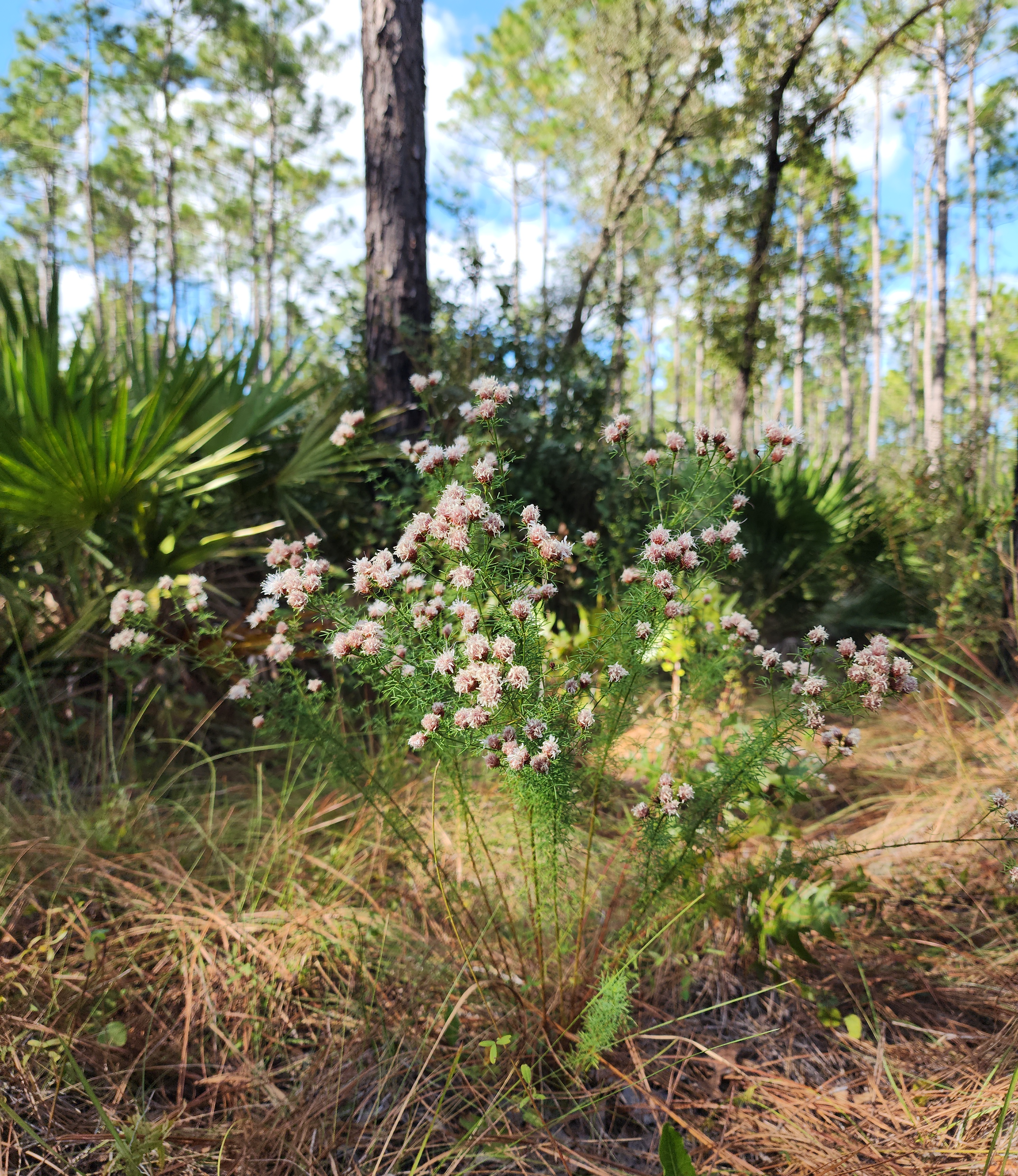
- Flowering at Silver Springs State Park

Conservation status
- Secure (NatureServe)

Scientific classification
- Kingdom: Plantae
- Clade: Tracheophytes
- Clade: Angiosperms
- Clade: Eudicots
- Clade: Rosids
- Order: Fabales
- Family: Fabaceae
- Subfamily: Faboideae
- Genus: Dalea
- Species: D. pinnata

Binomial name
- Dalea pinnata (J.F.Gmel.) Barneby

= Dalea pinnata =

Flowering plant mostly found in Florida

Dalea pinnata is a flowering plant mostly growing in Florida. Also found in Alabama, Georgia, North Carolina, and South Carolina, it is a member of the pea family (Fabaceae) and is commonly called summer farewell. A lter summer and early fall bloomer, It grows in sandhill, flatwoods and scrub habitats and blooms in late summer, attracting various pollinators. It is a larval host for Zerene cesonia.

A short-lived perennial, Dalea pinnata buds are reddish and flowers pinkish-white or lavender-white. It may reach a height of up to 2 feet (approximately 0.6 meters).

The genus was named after Samuel Dale, a British botanist and apothecary, and pinnata refers to the pinnate leaves. It is a host plant for Southern dogface butterflies (Zerene cesonia).

== Gallery ==
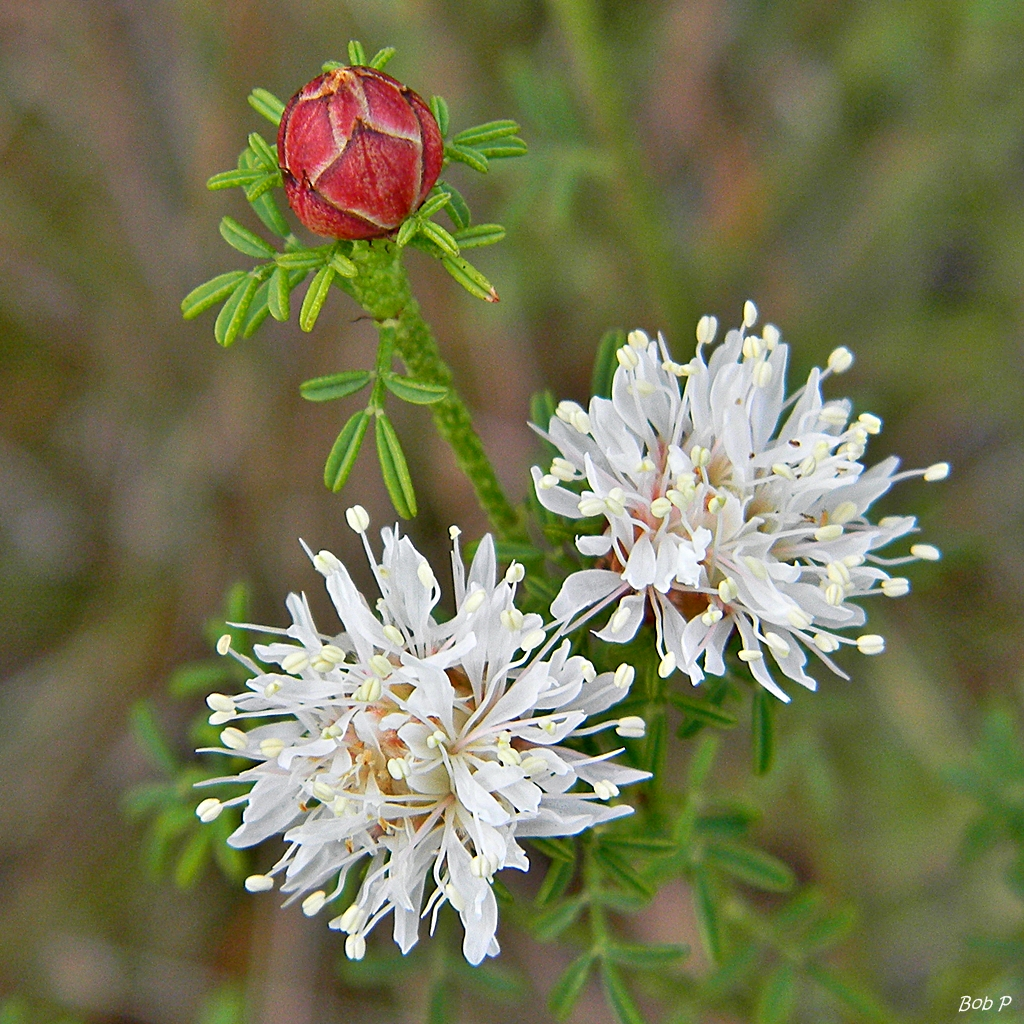
Red bract and flowers, Jonathan Dickinson State Park, Florida

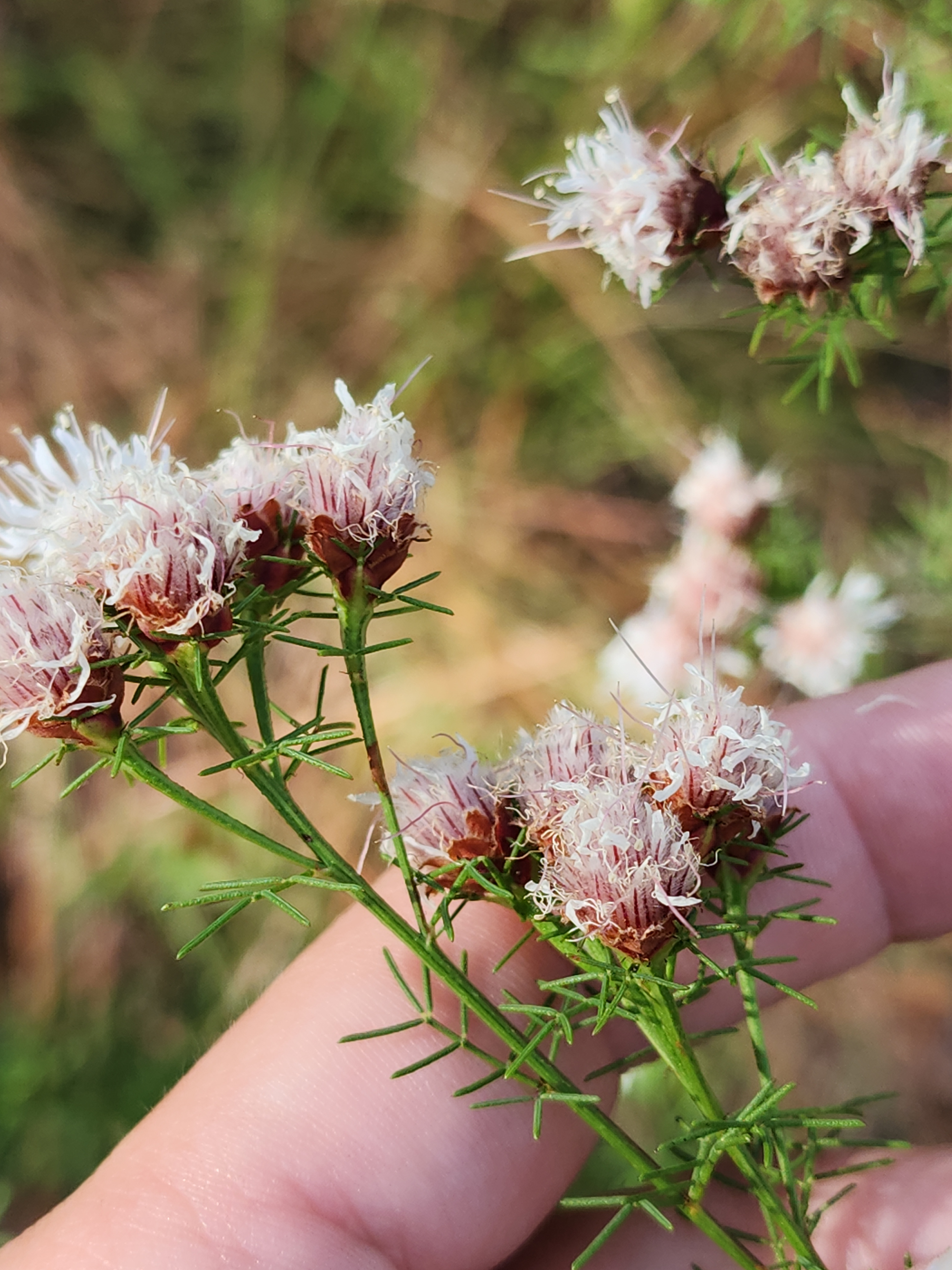
To scale
