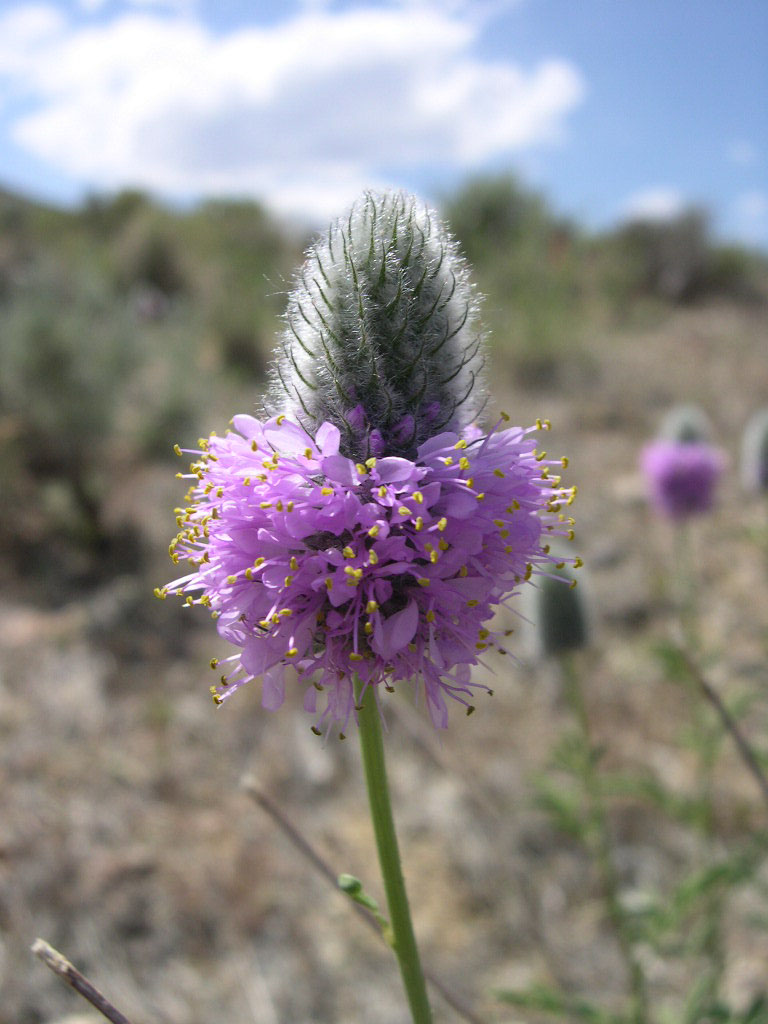

Conservation status
- Apparently Secure (NatureServe)

Scientific classification
- Kingdom: Plantae
- Clade: Embryophytes
- Clade: Tracheophytes
- Clade: Spermatophytes
- Clade: Angiosperms
- Clade: Eudicots
- Clade: Rosids
- Order: Fabales
- Family: Fabaceae
- Subfamily: Faboideae
- Genus: Dalea
- Species: D. ornata

Binomial name
- Dalea ornata (Douglas ex Hook.) Eaton & Wright

Synonyms
- Kuhnistera ornata; Petalostemon lagopus; Petalostemon macrostachyus; Petalostemon ornatus

= Dalea ornata =

Plant species in the pea family

Dalea ornata, the Blue Mountain prairie clover, is a perennial subshrub or herb of the subfamily Faboideae in the pea family (Fabaceae).

It is found in the Great Basin region of the Western United States, in the states of California, Idaho, Oregon, Nevada, and Washington. Its habitats include sagebrush, rocky ridges, and sandy to shaley barrens.
