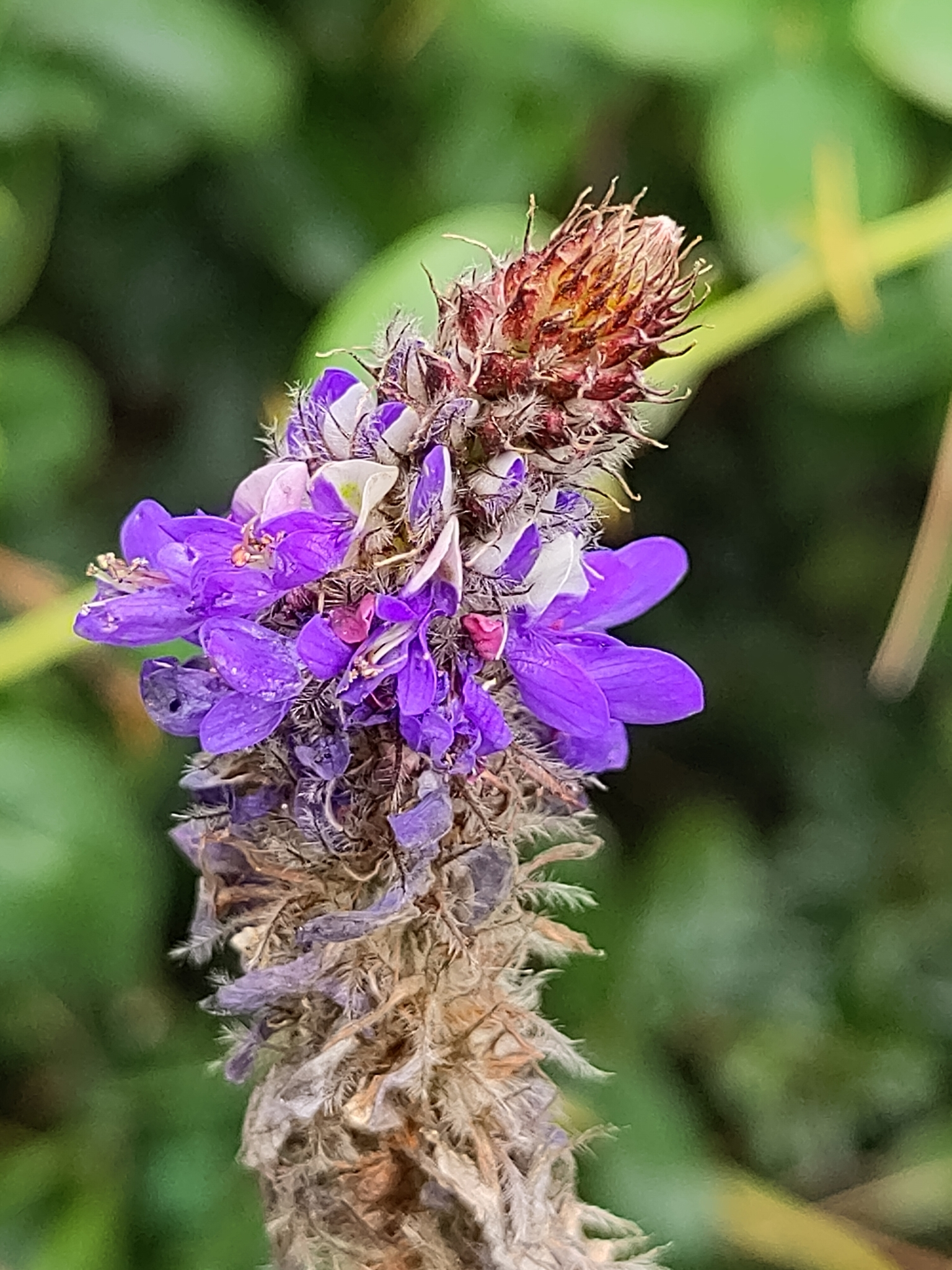

Scientific classification
- Kingdom: Plantae
- Clade: Tracheophytes
- Clade: Angiosperms
- Clade: Eudicots
- Clade: Rosids
- Order: Fabales
- Family: Fabaceae
- Subfamily: Faboideae
- Genus: Dalea
- Species: D. coerulea

Binomial name
- Dalea coerulea (L.f.) Schinz & Thell.

= Dalea coerulea =

Species of plant

Dalea coerulea is a species of flowering plant from the genus Dalea.

== Range and habitat ==
In Colombia Dalea coerulea is predominantly found on truncated clayey soils. Next to Colombia, the species is also observed and described to be found in Ecuador. This is also confirmed by observational data available in citizen science efforts.
