= Dalea neomexicana =

Conservation status
- Secure (NatureServe)

Scientific classification
- Kingdom: Plantae
- Clade: Tracheophytes
- Clade: Angiosperms
- Clade: Eudicots
- Clade: Rosids
- Order: Fabales
- Family: Fabaceae
- Subfamily: Faboideae
- Genus: Dalea
- Species: D. neomexicana

Binomial name
- Dalea neomexicana (A.Gray) Cory

Species of legume

Dalea neomexicana, the downy prairie clover, is a perennial plant in the legume family (Fabaceae) found in the Sonoran Desert and grasslands of southeastern Arizona to western Texas and into Mexico. Its common name refers to its silky hairs covering it. It is a perennial herb growing up to 8 in (20 cm) tall.
