= Dalea hallii =

Scientific classification
- Kingdom: Plantae
- Clade: Tracheophytes
- Clade: Angiosperms
- Clade: Eudicots
- Clade: Rosids
- Order: Fabales
- Family: Fabaceae
- Subfamily: Faboideae
- Genus: Dalea
- Species: D. hallii

Binomial name
- Dalea hallii A.Gray

Synonyms
- Parosela hallii (A.Gray) A.Heller

Species of plant

Dalea hallii, Hall's prairie clover or Hall's dalea, is a species of flowering plant in the family Fabaceae, native to east-central Texas. Pollinated by honey bees and bumble bees, it is a perennial reaching 20 cm (8 in).
