= Dalea mollis =

Scientific classification
- Kingdom: Plantae
- Clade: Tracheophytes
- Clade: Angiosperms
- Clade: Eudicots
- Clade: Rosids
- Order: Fabales
- Family: Fabaceae
- Subfamily: Faboideae
- Genus: Dalea
- Species: D. mollis

Binomial name
- Dalea mollis Benth.

Species of legume

Dalea mollis is a species of flowering plant in the legume family which is known by the common name hairy prairie clover.

== Distribution ==
This wildflower is native to the deserts of California, Arizona, and Northwestern Mexico.

It is a common member of the Mojave Desert and Sonoran Desert ecoregions. It forms a small, flat patches on the gravelly desert floor and on slopes and weedy roadsides.

== Description ==
Dalea mollis is a small cloverlike mat-forming annual legume with gland-dotted foliage covered thickly in long white hairs. The leaves are made up of several pairs of small, folded, oval-shaped leaflets each about a centimeter long. The plant flowers in pea-like blooms just under a centimeter wide which may be lavender, yellow, or white, sometimes bicolored. The fruit is a small, single-seeded legume pod.
