= C. californica =

C. californica may refer to:

- Calliandra californica, the Baja fairy duster, a shrub species native to Mexico
- Callipepla californica, the California quail, California valley quail or valley quail, a small ground-dwelling bird species
- Camissonia californica, the California suncup, a flowering plant species native to California and Arizona
- Campanula californica, the swamp bellflower or swamp harebell, a plant species endemic to California
- Cardamine californica, the milkmaid, a flowering plant species native to western North America from Washington to Baja California
- Carpenteria californica, an evergreen shrub species native to California
- Catocala californica, a moth species found from British Columbia and Alberta south through Washington and Oregon to California
- Colubrina californica, the Las Animas nakedwood, a shrub species native to the Sonoran Desert of the southwestern United States and northern Mexico
- Coreopsis californica, an annual plant species
- Corynactis californica, a bright red colonial anthozoan species
- Cuscuta californica, the chaparral dodder or California dodder, a plant species native to western North America
- Cylindropuntia californica, the California cholla, snake cholla or cane cholla, a cactus species native to southern California and Baja California

== See also ==
- List of Latin and Greek words commonly used in systematic names#C
