= Calliandra conferta =

Scientific classification
- Kingdom: Plantae
- Clade: Embryophytes
- Clade: Tracheophytes
- Clade: Angiosperms
- Clade: Eudicots
- Clade: Rosids
- Order: Fabales
- Family: Fabaceae
- Subfamily: Caesalpinioideae
- Clade: Mimosoid clade
- Genus: Calliandra
- Species: C. conferta

Binomial name
- Calliandra conferta Benth.

Synonyms
- Feuilleea texana Kuntze

Species of legume

Calliandra conferta is a formerly accepted species of flowering plants of the genus Calliandra in the family Fabaceae.

Calliandra conferta is a synonym of Calliandra eriophylla.
