= Soldierwood =

Soldierwood is a common name for several plants and may refer to:

- Calliandra purpurea, native to the Lesser Antilles and northern South America
- Colubrina elliptica, native to Florida, the Caribbean, Central America, and northern South America
