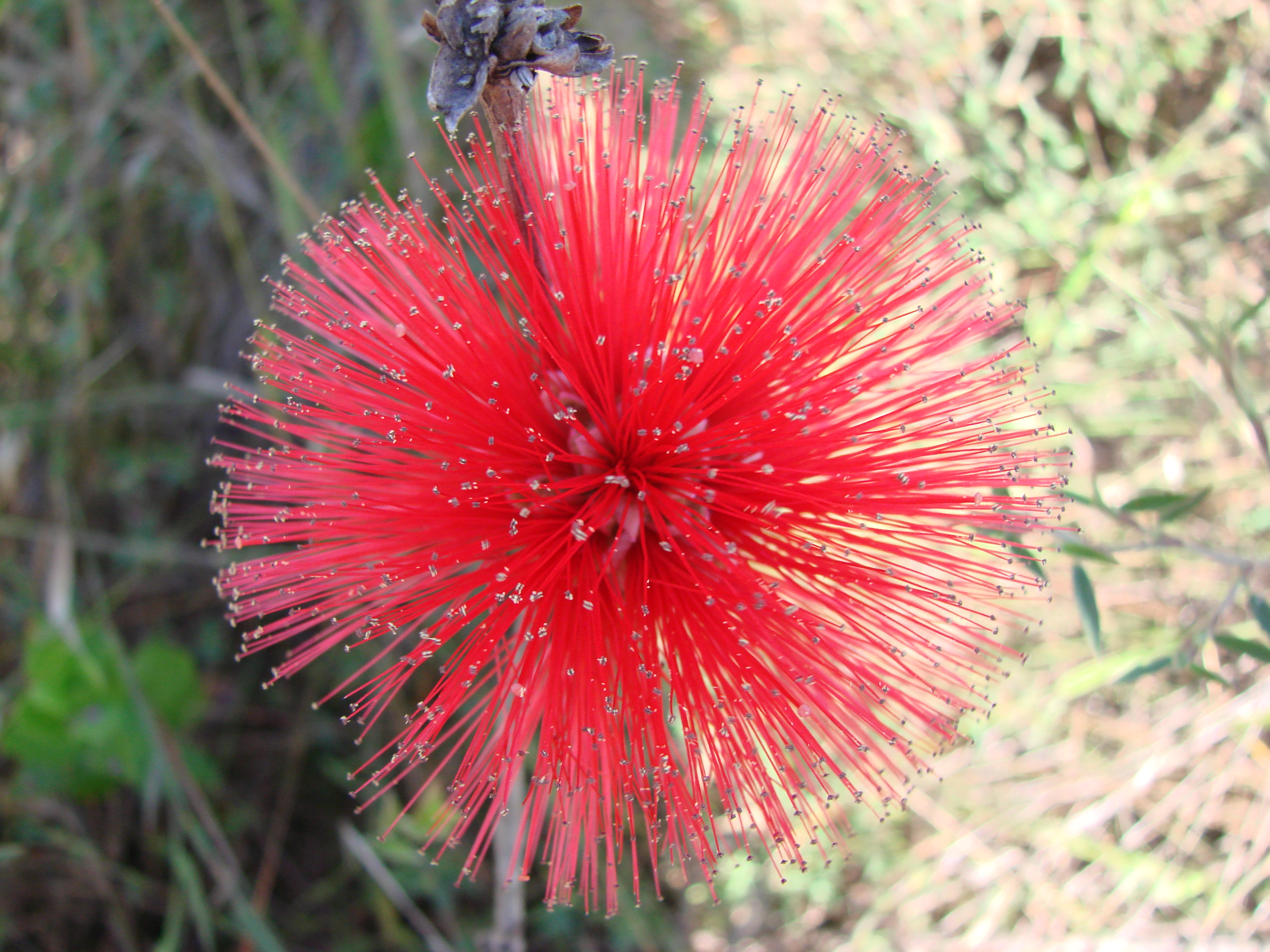

Scientific classification
- Kingdom: Plantae
- Clade: Tracheophytes
- Clade: Angiosperms
- Clade: Eudicots
- Clade: Rosids
- Order: Fabales
- Family: Fabaceae
- Subfamily: Caesalpinioideae
- Clade: Mimosoid clade
- Genus: Calliandra
- Species: C. dysantha

Binomial name
- Calliandra dysantha Benth.

Synonyms
- Calliandra abbreviata Benth.; Feuilleea abbreviata Kuntze; Feuilleea dysantha Kuntze

= Calliandra dysantha =

Species of legume

Calliandra dysantha is a species of flowering plants of the genus Calliandra in the family Fabaceae. Is native to Brazil.
