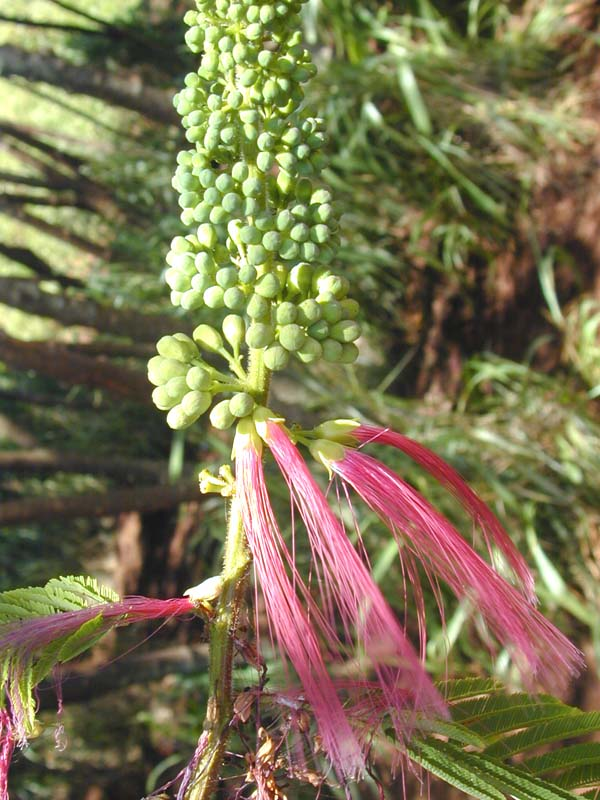
- Buds and open flowers of Calliandra calothyrsus

Scientific classification
- Kingdom: Plantae
- Clade: Embryophytes
- Clade: Tracheophytes
- Clade: Angiosperms
- Clade: Eudicots
- Clade: Rosids
- Order: Fabales
- Family: Fabaceae
- Subfamily: Caesalpinioideae
- Clade: Mimosoid clade
- Genus: Calliandra
- Species: C. calothyrsus

Binomial name
- Calliandra calothyrsus Meisn.

Synonyms
- Calliandra houstoniana var. calothyrsus (Meisn.) Barneby

= Calliandra calothyrsus =

Species of legume

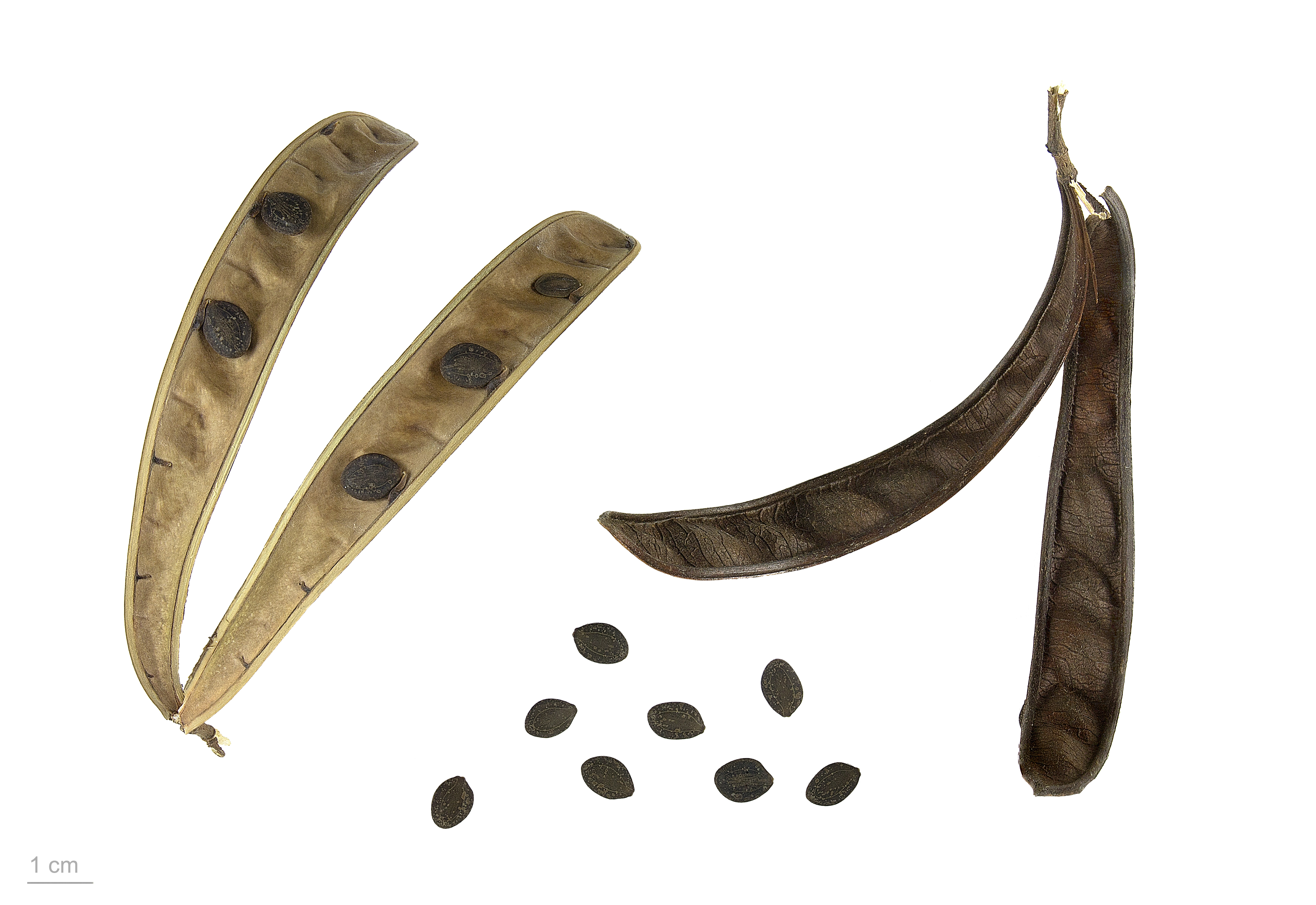
Calliandra calothyrsus - MHNT

Calliandra calothyrsus is a small leguminous tree or large shrub in the family Fabaceae. It is native to the tropics of Central America where its typical habitat is wet tropical forests or seasonally dry forests with a dry season of four to seven months, when it may become deciduous. This tree grows to about 6 m (20 ft) and has pinnate compound leaves and flowers with a boss of prominent reddish-purple stamens. It is not very drought-tolerant, and the above-ground parts can be short-lived in case of severe drought lasting many months, but the roots regularly resprout.

It is a multipurpose legume tree that can improve the soil by fixing nitrogen from the atmosphere. It is easily grown from seed; growth is slow at first but speeds up after the first year. It is used for reforestation, provides soil stabilisation on sloping sites, and provides useful high-quality fodder for livestock. It can be regularly coppiced to provide firewood. Because of these features, it has been planted in other parts of the tropics, but care may have to be taken so that it does not become an invasive species. However, it lacks many features of typical invasive trees, naturally growing in disturbed areas rather than mature forests.

== Basic information ==
Calliandra calothyrsus is a small tree or a large shrub. It is usually 4–6 m (13–20 ft) high but might reach a height of 12 m (39 ft) under favourable conditions. The stems are quite small with a maximum base diameter of about 30 cm (12 in), the bark is blackish-brown. The canopy is dense with alternate, petiolate, bipinnately compound leaves of 10–28 cm (4–11 in) lengths, which are folding together at night. Calliandra calothyrsus has both superficial and deep-growing roots. While the above-ground parts are only short-lived, the roots are able to sprout for up to 20 years.

The flowers are subterminal inflorescences with numerous long, hair-like purple or red stamens. Flowering starts 3–6 months after planting. The fruits consist of pods (8–11 cm long and 12 mm wide) that contain 3-15 seeds. Seeds mature 2 months after pollination and can be planted immediately as they have no dormancy period.

=== Systematics ===
The genus Calliandra belongs to the family Fabaceae (Leguminosae), subfamily Mimosoideae and tribe Ingae. Calliandra is a large genus with about 145 species, mainly from South and North America but also from Madagascar, India and Africa. Calliandra calothyrsus is one of seven species in a subgroup of the genus, the Racemose. Calliandra calothyrsus was described by Meissner (1848). The names Calliandra confusa and Calliandra similis can be used synonymously.

=== Origin and regions of cultivation ===
Calliandra callothyrsus is native to the humid and sub-humid areas of Central America and Mexico. There it can be found from the western Pacific coast of Mexico to Panama. But people most probably have not been cultivating or studying it there. Calliandra has been introduced to Java in 1936 and spread from there over the Indonesian Archipelago and to other parts of southeast Asia. Nowadays it can also be found in other parts of the tropics, mainly in Uganda, Rwanda and other parts of east Africa as well as in Australia, Hawaii, Brazil and Bolivia.

=== Environmental requirements ===
==== Temperature and altitude ====
Calliandra calothyrsus grows in regions with mean monthly minimum temperatures of 18–24 °C (64–75 °F) and mean monthly maximum temperatures of 24–28 °C (75–82 °F). It can be found in a wide range of altitudes but seems to grow best at altitudes of 250–1300 m asl. However it can naturally reach an altitude of 1800 m asl in Guatemala and even grows well if planted at 2000 m asl as it was done in Indonesia and Kenya. At these altitudes Calliandra calothyrsus has quite some cool tolerance for a tropical species but it is not tolerant to frost.

==== Precipitation ====
Calliandra calothyrsus tolerates annual rainfalls of 700–4,000 mm (28–160 in). It usually grows in wet tropical forests or in seasonally dry forests with a dry season of 4–6 months. Calliandra calothyrsus is not very drought tolerant and will die back under severe droughts. However, it is recovering in most cases after the onset of the rainy season. Calliandra calothyrsus is semi-deciduous in regions with long dry seasons whereas it is evergreen in humid climates.

==== Soil ====
Calliandra calothyrsus is adapted to different types of soils and more tolerant to depleted, low-phosphorus, acidic soils than other fast-growing fodder tree legumes. The best growing conditions are on light textured, slightly acidic soils but it is also well adapted to acidic soils with poor soil fertility and is able to grow on infertile and compacted soils.

== Production ==
=== Seed production and pre-treatment ===
The seed production is during the dry season from June to September. After collecting, drying and storing of the seeds they can germinate without a time-limited dormancy period,. However, the seed requires scarification pre-treatment (so water can enter in time). Mechanical (physical) scarification works and some recommend soaking in 48 hours (without supporting data). Mature, dry calliandra seeds do not usually take up water in a few days, without real pretreatment, and seeds that do can rot fast in water if not picked up daily. Scratching calliandra seeds in a single layer against a rough cement floor gave much faster germination than no-treatment control, and soaking in shallow unheated water for not more than 24 h after mechanical scarification improved germination further (36% germination after 14 days in control vs. 89% scratched then soaked. Further showed the seeds taking up water can start to ferment 8–24 hours after water uptake, and it can take 3 weeks for half of Calliandra to take up water without another pretreatment than can cool water soaking. The seeds could be stored at least for 1–2 years if dry and mature and effectively pretreated before seeding, but since Calliandra calothyrsus sets fruits continuously some places there is less need to store.

=== Nursery practices ===
Otherwise seedlings can be produced by sowing seeds in a nursery bed and allowing them to grow until they are 20 to 50 cm high with a root collar diameter of 0.5 to 1.0 cm. At this stage they can be replanted. Another method is to produce stumps. In this case the seedlings can grow for four months until they reach a height of 75 to 100 cm subsequently they are top- and root-pruned to about 30 to 20 cm. Stumps are very useful for interplanting among other trees or for a better establishment on steep slopes.

=== Cultivation ===
Plantation of Calliandra calothyrsus can be either done by direct seeding or by seedlings. For direct seeding the rows should be free of weeds and the ground should be roughly cultivated. The seeds should be sown at 1 to 3 cm depth. In case of planting seedlings the complete area or at least strips or spots have to be cleared. Plantation of seedlings is done at the beginning of the rainy season and an initial treatment of fertilizer can have a positive effect on the seedlings. The early growth is slow but after the mycorrhizal infection the plant grows up to 3.5m in 6 months. Because of the slow early growth weeding is necessary in the first year but afterwards the canopy closes and weed is no longer problematic. Within the first year Calliandra flowers and bears fruits and after 12 months the plants can be 3 to 5 m tall and 5 cm in diameter at stump height. At this stage the plant has the optimal size for the use of firewood. Harvesting is done at the end of the dry season and for a faster resprouting the cutting is done 20 to 50 cm above the ground.

=== Pests and diseases ===
Only minor damages are caused by pests on Calliandra calothyrsus. Seedlings might be attacked by the teak sapling borer (Sahyadrassus malabaricus). Further Pachnoda ephippiata might feed on flowers, fruits and foliage, what causes floral abortion and poor seed production. Fungal attacks can cause serious damages on Calliandra calothyrsus when the plants are cut back too low prior to rainfall or during the wet season.

== Product and uses ==
=== Soil improvement ===
Calliandra calothyrsus is a small legume tree able to fix nitrogen from the atmosphere, which has a positive effect on the nitrogen content in the soil. Calliandra calothyrsus can be used in crop rotation with sugar cane or with other crops. Calliandra calothyrsus is used for example as stake for other crop species, such as climbing beans, Calliandra calothyrsus also provides shade for seedlings of plantations species, like damar (Agathis loranthifolia) for example. Calliandra calothyrsus can be used to sustain soil fertility and reduce the need for shifting cultivation and forest degradation in southern Cameroon, but improved low-cost methods for establishment by Mandal and Nielsen (2004, the ref. list) were found necessary for farmers' acceptance

=== Reforestation ===
Calliandra calothyrsus is a fast growing tree that has a potential for reforestation in the Tropics. It can be aerially seeded to afforest inaccessible mountainous areas. It prevents soil erosion encountered in deforested areas. Its rooting system is composed by deep roots as well as numerous lateral roots that enhance a good soil structure.

=== Animal fodder ===
Calliandra leaves, pods and young shoots provide a highly valuable protein source for animals. It is already used widely in the Tropics: in Indonesia for example for the dairy cattle. Normal supplementation rate of Calliandra calothyrsus is around 20–40%. In Uganda, Calliandra calothyrsus is mostly mixed with other fodder for cows (grasses, tree species...). Calliandra calothyrsus leaves do not contain any toxic compounds but high condensed tannins concentrations has been reported, which could limit the digestibility for ruminants. The condensed tannin content varies from traces to high with accessions and varies with season too; a high content has even been combined with high protein and dry-matter content in one accession; also, the ratio to proteins matters as well as the composition of the condensed tannins It has been shown that moderate condensed tannin concentrations (2–4% dry matter) can enhance the protein metabolism for ruminants. However, high tannin levels up to 11% reduce digestibility. Monogastric animals seem to have more problems metabolising the amount of tannins in Calliandra calothyrsus. Calliandra calothyrsus should not be used in grazing regions only, because the risk that animals destroy the tree bark is high, which leads to a high tree mortality. Animals should eat freshly cut Calliandra leaves that were cut between 0 and 1 meter. Apparently, dry leaves seem to be less palatable to animals. Some beneficial effects of using Calliandra calothyrsus as fodder have been observed in Uganda, where farmers noticed an increase in milk production. It is a cheap fodder that also increases the production and fat content of milk. The crude protein content is 20–25% of dry matter. Calliandra calothyrsus has a yield of 7–10 t/ha/year of dry matter in Indonesia.

=== Firewood ===
Calliandra calothyrsus is a valuable wood source for poor populations that still rely on firewood as an energy source. Its fast-growing rate enables quick fuelwood production. The drying process is faster because Calliandra calothyrsus has already a lower moisture content (9–12%) than other tree species (13.5%). The wood can already be used after 6 days. Its calorific value is around 4720 kcal/kg. The yield is long-term high: Calliandra calothyrsus can be harvested during 10 to 20 years.

== Perspectives ==
Calliandra calothyrsus might have a huge potential use in the Tropics which are the regions where problems linked to agricultural products are growing. As most tropical soils are losing their fertility, planting Calliandra calothyrsus is a way to improve soil fertility and stabilize the soil structure. Agricultural systems such as intercropping with Calliandra calothyrsus are promising and are a way to deal with deforestation issues. Despite all its benefits, Calliandra calothyrsus could become an invasive plant if it's not well managed. Moreover, pests and diseases have recently started to appear in East Africa. Nevertheless, Calliandra calothyrsus is eaten by livestock, is not thorny, does not shoot from roots, is not invasive in forests, and has a promising future in the Tropics.
