= Calliandra bella =

Scientific classification
- Kingdom: Plantae
- Clade: Tracheophytes
- Clade: Angiosperms
- Clade: Eudicots
- Clade: Rosids
- Order: Fabales
- Family: Fabaceae
- Subfamily: Caesalpinioideae
- Clade: Mimosoid clade
- Genus: Calliandra
- Species: C. bella

Binomial name
- Calliandra bella (Spreng.) Benth.

Synonyms
- Acacia bella Spreng.; Feuilleea bella Kuntze

Species of legume

Calliandra bella is a species of flowering plants of the genus Calliandra in family Fabaceae. It is a shrub or small tree and is endemic to forests of the Bahia coast in Brazil.
