= Calliandra tumbeziana =

Conservation status
- Vulnerable (IUCN 2.3)

Scientific classification
- Kingdom: Plantae
- Clade: Tracheophytes
- Clade: Angiosperms
- Clade: Eudicots
- Clade: Rosids
- Order: Fabales
- Family: Fabaceae
- Subfamily: Caesalpinioideae
- Clade: Mimosoid clade
- Genus: Calliandra
- Species: C. tumbeziana

Binomial name
- Calliandra tumbeziana J.F.Macbr.

Species of plant

Calliandra tumbeziana is a species of plant in the family Fabaceae. It is found only in Peru.
