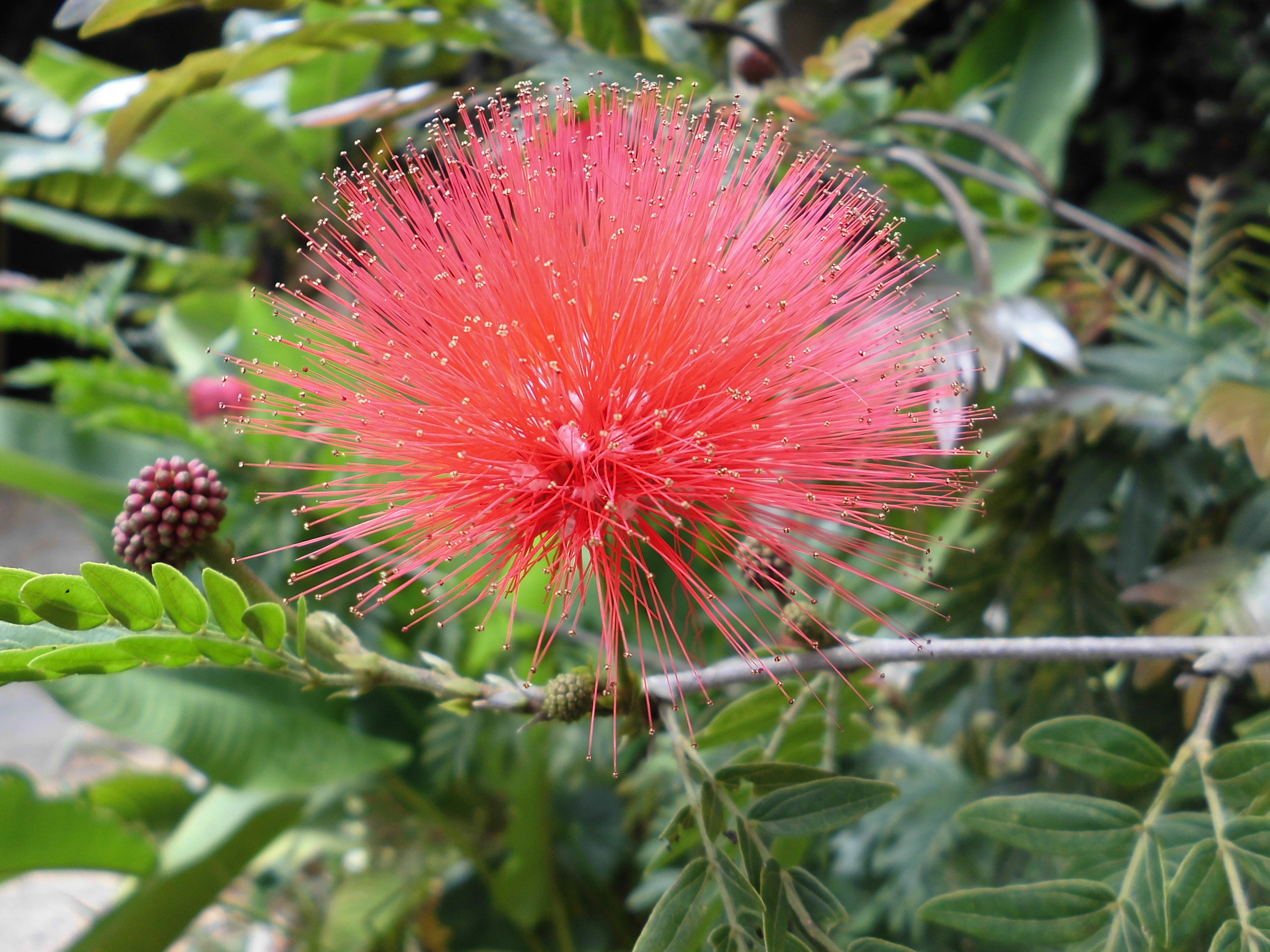

Scientific classification
- Kingdom: Plantae
- Clade: Tracheophytes
- Clade: Angiosperms
- Clade: Eudicots
- Clade: Rosids
- Order: Fabales
- Family: Fabaceae
- Subfamily: Caesalpinioideae
- Clade: Mimosoid clade
- Genus: Calliandra
- Species: C. riparia

Binomial name
- Calliandra riparia Pittier

Synonyms
- Calliandra schultzei Harms

= Calliandra riparia =

Species of legume

Calliandra riparia is a species of flowering plants of the genus Calliandra in the family Fabaceae. It is native to Panama, Colombia, Guyana, and Venezuela
