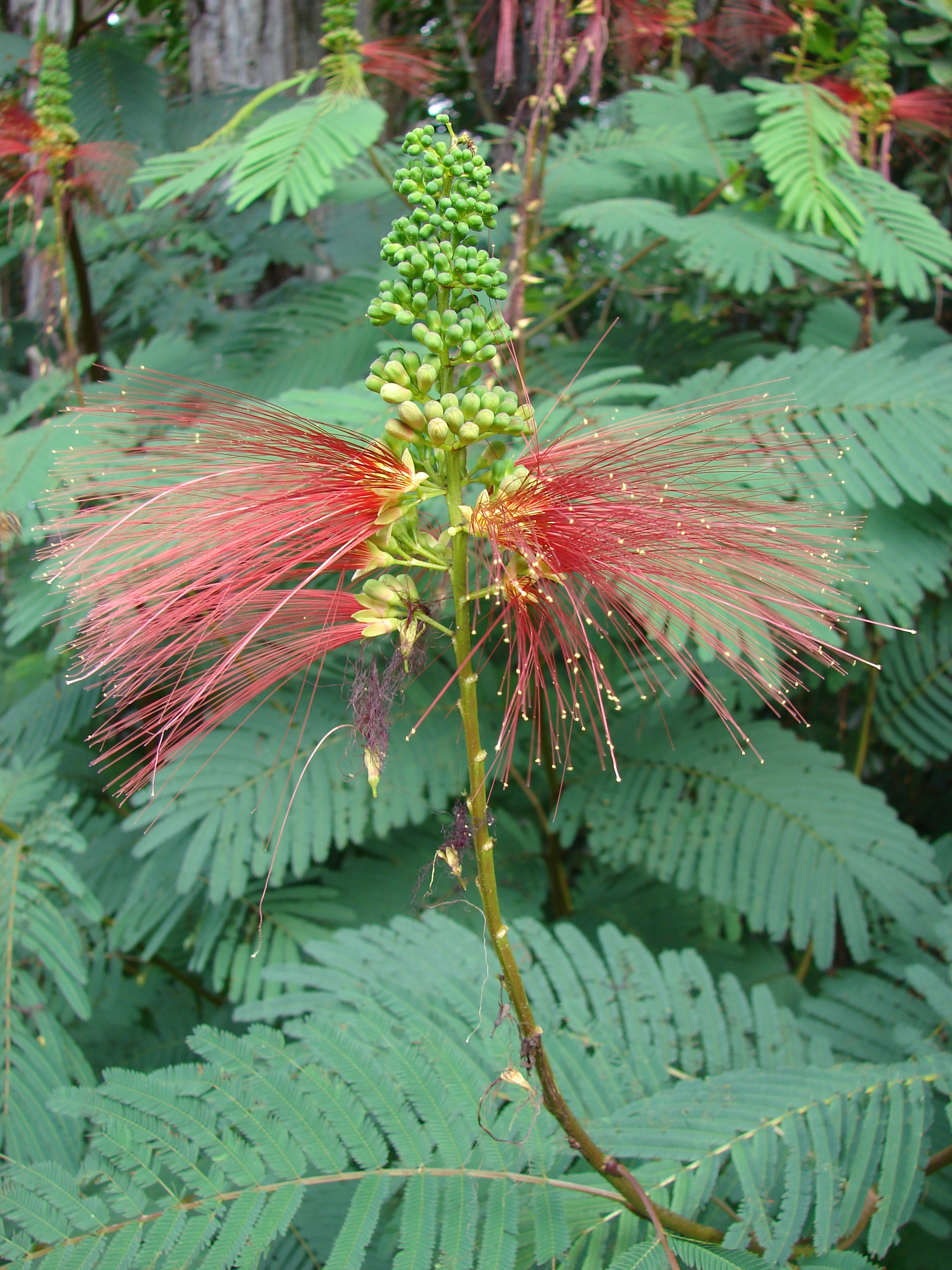

Scientific classification
- Kingdom: Plantae
- Clade: Tracheophytes
- Clade: Angiosperms
- Clade: Eudicots
- Clade: Rosids
- Order: Fabales
- Family: Fabaceae
- Subfamily: Caesalpinioideae
- Clade: Mimosoid clade
- Genus: Calliandra
- Species: C. houstoniana

Binomial name
- Calliandra houstoniana (Mill.)Standl.

Synonyms
- Acacia houstoni (L'Her.) Willd.; Acacia metrosideriflora Schltdl.; Acacia metrosiderifolia Schltdl. [Spelling variant]; Anneslia alamosensis Britton & Rose; Anneslia etzatlana Britton & Rose; Anneslia falcifolia Salisb.; Anneslia houstoniana (Mill.) Britton & Rose; Anneslia lucens Britton; Anneslia lucens Britton & Rose; Calliandra houstonii (L'Her.) Benth.; Calliandra lucens (Britton) Standl.; Calliandra metrosideriflora Benth.; Calliandra metrosiderifolia Benth. [Spelling variant]; Mimosa houstoni L'Her.; Mimosa houstoniana Mill.; Mimosa houstonii L'Her. [Spelling variant]; Mimosa houstonii L'Hér.

= Calliandra houstoniana =

Species of legume

Calliandra houstoniana is a species of flowering plants of the genus Calliandra in the family Fabaceae.

== Medicinal use ==
The Aztecs called this plant the Tlacoxiloxochitl, and used it to aid in coughs. From An Aztec Herbal: "If one is troubled by a cough, let him forthwith sip the boiled liquor of the tlaco-xilo-xochitl root skinned and ground up in water; using a part of this, with honey, to anoint the throat. If he spits blood also, let him take the same liquor as a drink before meals. It would help if he gnawed and chewed some of the said root, with honey. The root of the herb called tzopelica-cococ, ground in tepid water is also of value for one with a cough; let him either drink the liquor or gnaw the root."
