= Calliandra glyphoxylon =

Conservation status
- Endangered (IUCN 3.1)

Scientific classification
- Kingdom: Plantae
- Clade: Tracheophytes
- Clade: Angiosperms
- Clade: Eudicots
- Clade: Rosids
- Order: Fabales
- Family: Fabaceae
- Subfamily: Caesalpinioideae
- Clade: Mimosoid clade
- Genus: Calliandra
- Species: C. glyphoxylon

Binomial name
- Calliandra glyphoxylon Spruce ex Benth.

Species of legume

Calliandra glyphoxylon is a species of plant in the family Fabaceae. It is found only in Ecuador. Its natural habitats are subtropical or tropical moist montane forests and subtropical or tropical dry shrubland.
