= Calliandra humilis =

Scientific classification
- Kingdom: Plantae
- Clade: Tracheophytes
- Clade: Angiosperms
- Clade: Eudicots
- Clade: Rosids
- Order: Fabales
- Family: Fabaceae
- Subfamily: Caesalpinioideae
- Clade: Mimosoid clade
- Genus: Calliandra
- Species: C. humilis

Binomial name
- Calliandra humilis Benth.

Synonyms
- Acacia humilis Schltdl.; Anneslia herbacea (A.Gray) Britton & Rose; Anneslia humilis Britton & Rose; Calliandra herbacea A.Gray; Calliandra herbacea Engelm.; Calliandra humilis B.L.Turner; Feuilleea humilis Kuntze

Species of legume

Calliandra humilis, the dwarf stickpea, is a species of flowering plants of the genus Calliandra in the family Fabaceae.

== Uses ==
The Zuni people use the powdered root of this plant three times a day for rashes.
