= Calliandra haematomma =

Scientific classification
- Kingdom: Plantae
- Clade: Tracheophytes
- Clade: Angiosperms
- Clade: Eudicots
- Clade: Rosids
- Order: Fabales
- Family: Fabaceae
- Subfamily: Caesalpinioideae
- Clade: Mimosoid clade
- Genus: Calliandra
- Species: C. haematomma

Binomial name
- Calliandra haematomma (Bertero ex DC.) Benth. (1844)

Synonyms
- Acacia haematomma Bertero ex DC. (1827); Feuilleea haematomma (Bertero ex DC.) Kuntze (1891)

Species of legume

Calliandra haematomma is a species of flowering plants of the genus Calliandra in the family Fabaceae. It is a shrub native to the Caribbean, including the Bahamas, Cuba, Hispaniola (the Dominican Republic and Haiti), Jamaica, the Leeward Islands, and Puerto Rico. Calliandra pilosa is a synonym of C. haematomma var. glabrata.

== Varieties ==
As of February 2025, Plants of the World Online accepted seven varieties:

- Calliandra haematomma var. colletioides (Griseb.) Barneby – Cuba
- Calliandra haematomma var. correllii Barneby – Bahamas
- Calliandra haematomma var. glabrata Griseb. – southeastern Jamaica
- Calliandra haematomma var. haematomma – Hispaniola, Puerto Rico, and the Virgin Islands
- Calliandra haematomma var. locoensis (R.G.García & Kolterman) Barneby – southwestern Puerto Rico
- Calliandra haematomma var. rivularis (Urb. & Ekman) Barneby – northern Hispaniola
- Calliandra haematomma var. tortuensis (Alain) Barneby – Haiti (Île de la Tortue)

== Conservation ==
Calliandra pilosa was assessed as "vulnerable" for the 1998 IUCN Red List. As of April 2023, C. pilosa was regarded as a synonym of Calliandra haematomma var. glabrata. It is endemic to southeastern Jamaica.
