= Calliandra harrisii =

Scientific classification
- Kingdom: Plantae
- Clade: Tracheophytes
- Clade: Angiosperms
- Clade: Eudicots
- Clade: Rosids
- Order: Fabales
- Family: Fabaceae
- Subfamily: Caesalpinioideae
- Clade: Mimosoid clade
- Genus: Calliandra
- Species: C. harrisii

Binomial name
- Calliandra harrisii (Lindl.) Benth.

Synonyms
- Calliandra cylindrocarpa Benth.; Clelia cylindrocarpa Benth.; Clelia ornata Casar.; Feuilleea harrisii Kuntze; Inga harrisii Lindl.

Species of legume

Calliandra harrisii is a species of flowering plants of the genus Calliandra in the family Fabaceae.
