= Calliandra peninsularis =

Scientific classification
- Kingdom: Plantae
- Clade: Tracheophytes
- Clade: Angiosperms
- Clade: Eudicots
- Clade: Rosids
- Order: Fabales
- Family: Fabaceae
- Subfamily: Caesalpinioideae
- Clade: Mimosoid clade
- Genus: Calliandra
- Species: C. peninsularis

Binomial name
- Calliandra peninsularis Rose

Synonyms
- Anneslia brandegeei (Britton & Rose) Gentry; Anneslia brandegeei Britton & Rose; Anneslia lagunae Britton & Rose; Anneslia peninsularis Rose; Calliandra brandegeei (Britton & Rose) Gentry

Species of legume

Calliandra peninsularis is a species of flowering plants of the genus Calliandra in the family Fabaceae. It is endemic to Baja California Sur state in Mexico.
