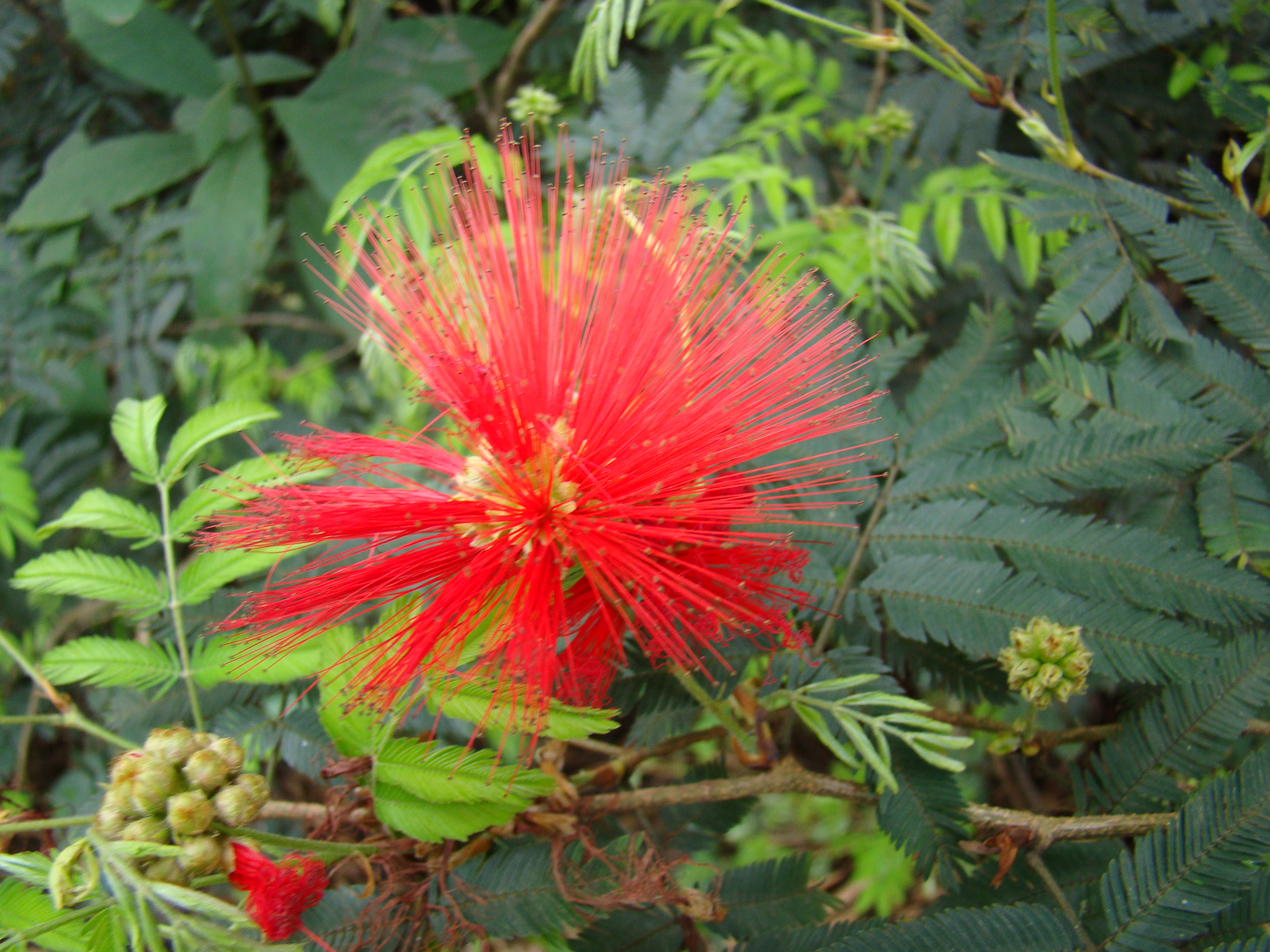

Scientific classification
- Kingdom: Plantae
- Clade: Tracheophytes
- Clade: Angiosperms
- Clade: Eudicots
- Clade: Rosids
- Order: Fabales
- Family: Fabaceae
- Subfamily: Caesalpinioideae
- Clade: Mimosoid clade
- Genus: Calliandra
- Species: C. tweediei

Binomial name
- Calliandra tweediei Benth., 1840

= Calliandra tweediei =

Species of legume

Calliandra tweediei is a species of flowering plants of the genus Calliandra in the family Fabaceae. The plant is native to the Atlantic Forest ecoregion in southeastern Brazil.
