= Calliandra parviflora =

Scientific classification
- Kingdom: Plantae
- Clade: Tracheophytes
- Clade: Angiosperms
- Clade: Eudicots
- Clade: Rosids
- Order: Fabales
- Family: Fabaceae
- Subfamily: Caesalpinioideae
- Clade: Mimosoid clade
- Genus: Calliandra
- Species: C. parviflora

Binomial name
- Calliandra parviflora Benth.

Synonyms
- Acacia pachyloma Mart.; Calliandra microphylla Benth.; Feuilleea pachyloma (Mart.) Kuntze

Species of legume

Calliandra parviflora is a species of flowering plants of the genus Calliandra in the family Fabaceae. The original description states that the flowers have purple stamens.
