= Calliandra comosa =

Conservation status
- Vulnerable (IUCN 2.3)

Scientific classification
- Kingdom: Plantae
- Clade: Tracheophytes
- Clade: Angiosperms
- Clade: Eudicots
- Clade: Rosids
- Order: Fabales
- Family: Fabaceae
- Subfamily: Caesalpinioideae
- Clade: Mimosoid clade
- Genus: Calliandra
- Species: C. comosa

Binomial name
- Calliandra comosa (Sw.) Benth.

Species of legume

Calliandra comosa is a species of plant in the family Fabaceae. It is found only in Jamaica.
