= Calliandra erythrocephala =

Scientific classification
- Kingdom: Plantae
- Clade: Tracheophytes
- Clade: Angiosperms
- Clade: Eudicots
- Clade: Rosids
- Order: Fabales
- Family: Fabaceae
- Subfamily: Caesalpinioideae
- Clade: Mimosoid clade
- Genus: Calliandra
- Species: C. erythrocephala

Binomial name
- Calliandra erythrocephala H.M.Hern. & M.Sousa

Species of legume

Calliandra erythrocephala is a species of flowering plants of the genus Calliandra in the family Fabaceae, endemic to southwestern Mexico. It is a small tree with bright red flowers. Like other members of the genus Calliandra, the filaments of the stamens are long and colourful, in this case about 4.5–5.5 centimetres (1.8–2.2 in) long. The species was first scientifically described in 1988.

== Distribution ==
Calliandra erythrocephala is known only from two widely separated localities in Oaxaca and Guerrero, at 1,000–2,230 metres (3,280–7,320 ft) elevation.
