= Calliandra elegans =

Scientific classification
- Kingdom: Plantae
- Clade: Tracheophytes
- Clade: Angiosperms
- Clade: Eudicots
- Clade: Rosids
- Order: Fabales
- Family: Fabaceae
- Subfamily: Caesalpinioideae
- Clade: Mimosoid clade
- Genus: Calliandra
- Species: C. elegans

Binomial name
- Calliandra elegans Renvoize, 1981

Species of legume

Calliandra elegans is a plant species in the genus Calliandra found in Brazil.
