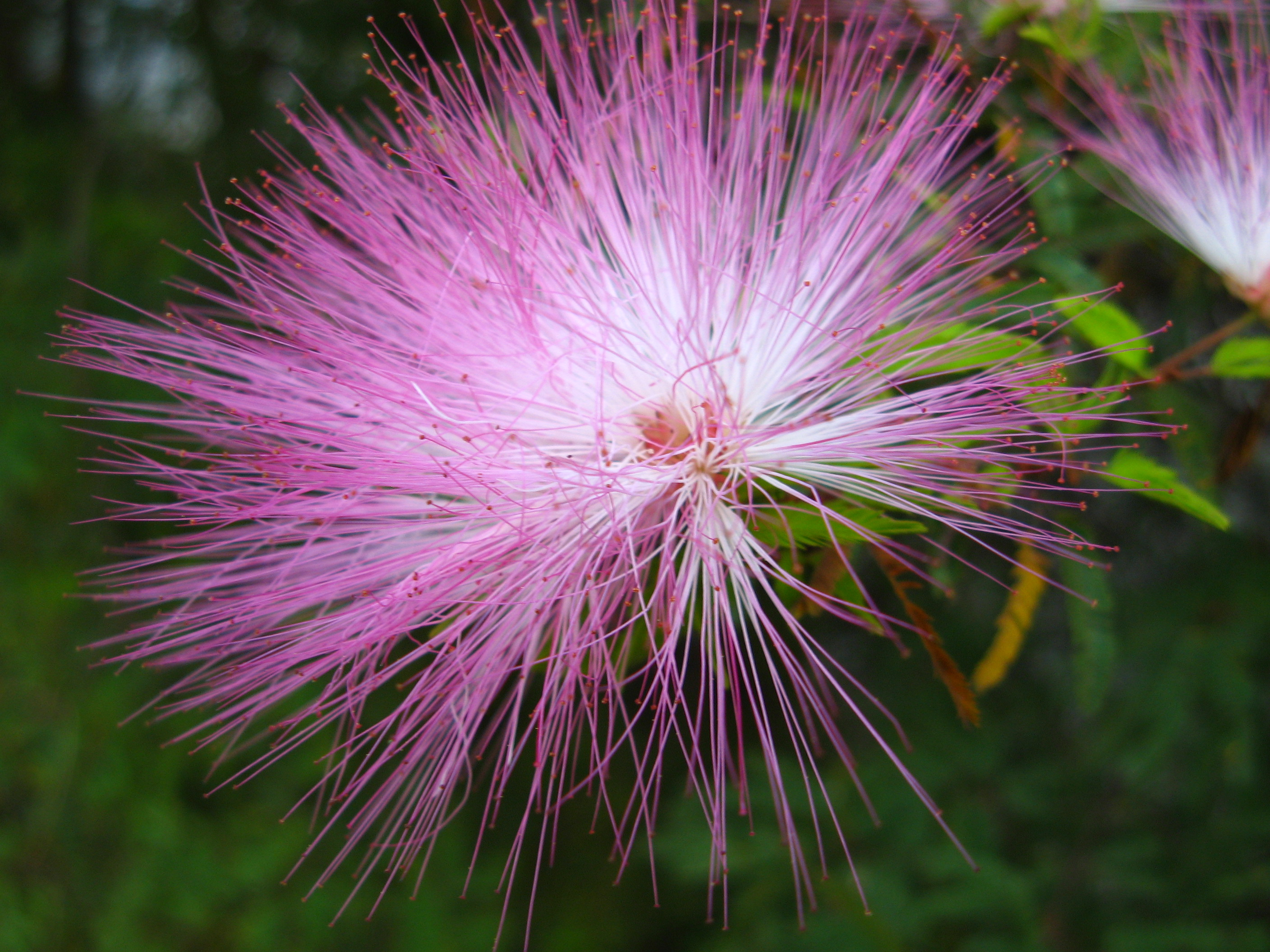
- Calliandra tergemina var. emarginata

Scientific classification
- Kingdom: Plantae
- Clade: Tracheophytes
- Clade: Angiosperms
- Clade: Eudicots
- Clade: Rosids
- Order: Fabales
- Family: Fabaceae
- Subfamily: Caesalpinioideae
- Clade: Mimosoid clade
- Genus: Calliandra
- Species: C. tergemina

Binomial name
- Calliandra tergemina (L.) Benth.

Synonyms
- Anneslia tergemina (L.) Britton & Rose; Feuilleea tergemina Kuntze; Inga caripensis Willd.; Inga tergemina (L.) Willd.; Mimosa caripensis Poir.; Mimosa tergemina L.

= Calliandra tergemina =

Species of legume

Calliandra tergemina is a species of flowering plants of the genus Calliandra in the family Fabaceae.
