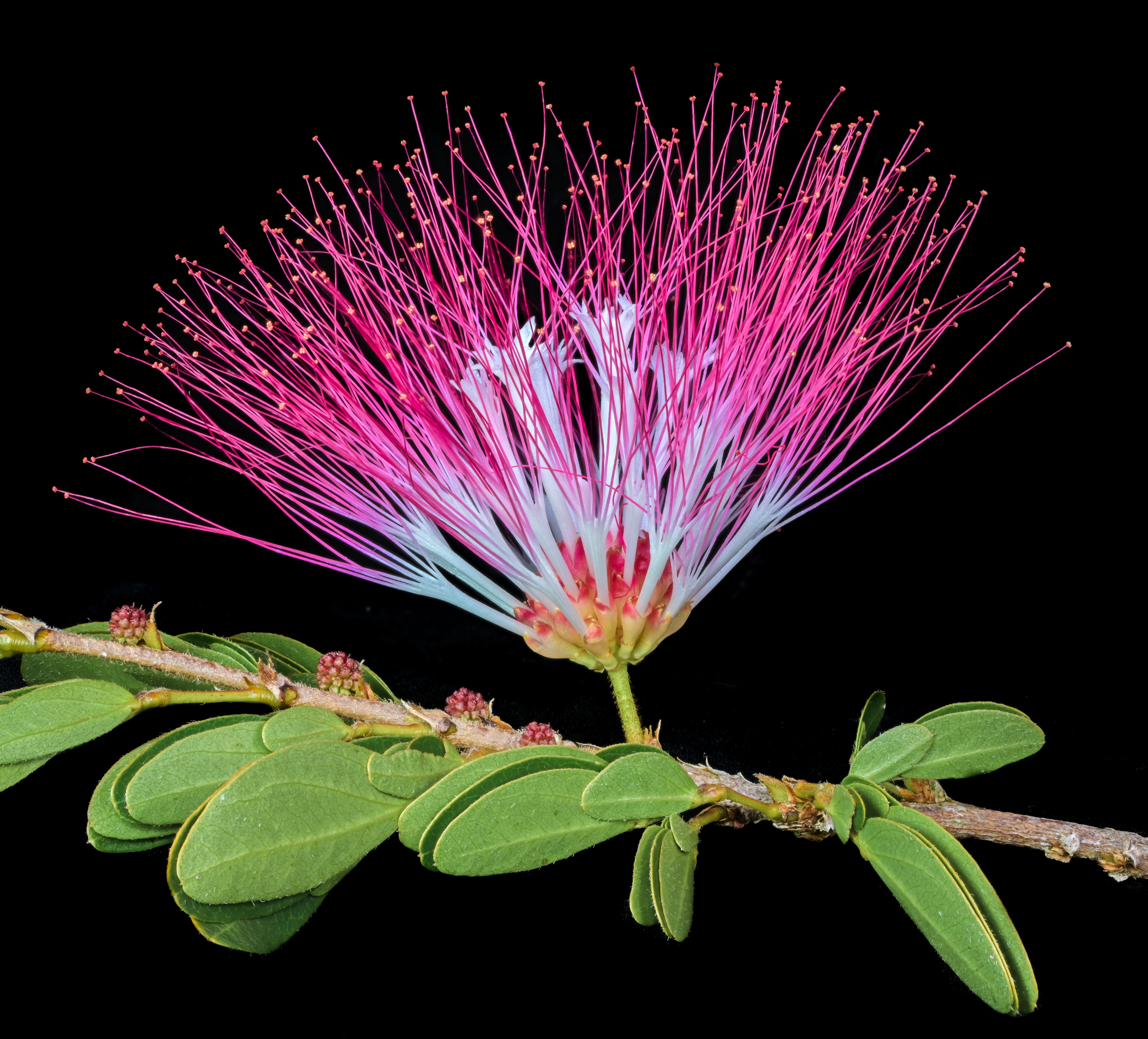

Scientific classification
- Kingdom: Plantae
- Clade: Tracheophytes
- Clade: Angiosperms
- Clade: Eudicots
- Clade: Rosids
- Order: Fabales
- Family: Fabaceae
- Subfamily: Caesalpinioideae
- Clade: Mimosoid clade
- Genus: Calliandra
- Species: C. angustifolia

Binomial name
- Calliandra angustifolia Spruce ex Benth.

Synonyms
- Calliandra sodiroi Harms; Calliandra stricta Rusby; Calliandra subnervosa Benth.; Feuilleea angustifolia

= Calliandra angustifolia =

Species of legume

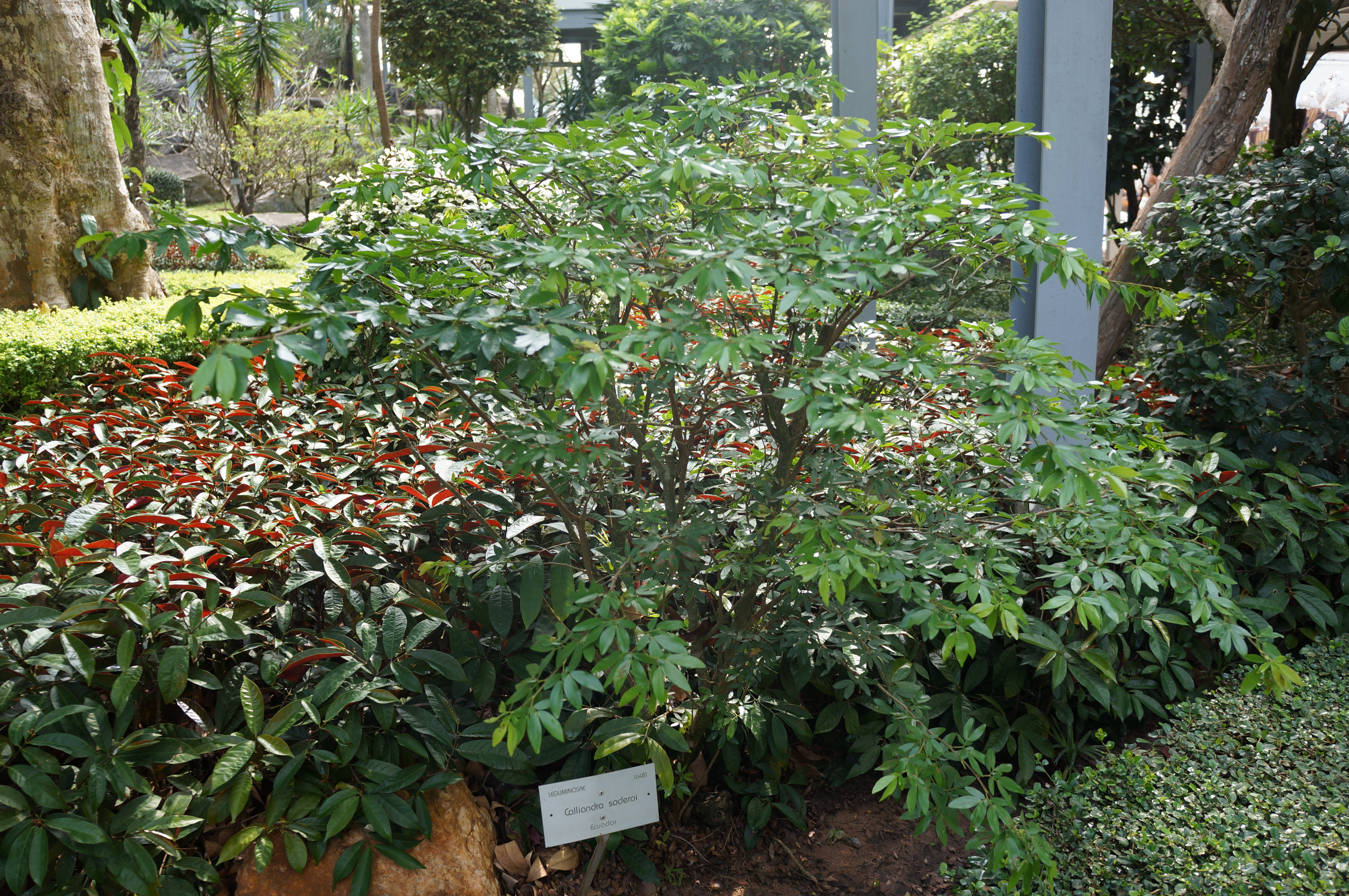
Calliandra angustifolia

Calliandra angustifolia is a small, riparian tree species of the Amazon Basin.

The plant has many common names, including bobinsana (alternately, bobinzana, bobensana, or bubinsana), balata, bubinianal, bushiglla, capabo, chipero, cigana, koprupi, kori-sacha, kuanti, neweí, quinilla blanca, semein, sháwi, yacu yutzu, and yopoyo.

The Shipibo-Conibo people of the Peruvian Amazon prepare a medicinal tincture from the bark of the tree, which they use to treat rheumatism and other ailments.
