= Calliandra physocalyx =

Scientific classification
- Kingdom: Plantae
- Clade: Tracheophytes
- Clade: Angiosperms
- Clade: Eudicots
- Clade: Rosids
- Order: Fabales
- Family: Fabaceae
- Subfamily: Caesalpinioideae
- Clade: Mimosoid clade
- Genus: Calliandra
- Species: C. physocalyx

Binomial name
- Calliandra physocalyx H.M.Hern. & M.Sousa

Species of legume

Calliandra physocalyx is a species of flowering plants of the genus Calliandra in the family Fabaceae, endemic to southwestern Mexico. It is a shrub with pink-and-white or pink-and-red flowers. Like other members of the genus Calliandra, the filaments of the stamens are long and colourful, in this case about 7.5 centimetres (3.0 in) long. The species was first scientifically described in 1988.

== Distribution ==
Calliandra physocalyx is known only from a small mountainous area of the Pacific slope of southwestern Mexico, in western Oaxaca and adjacent Guerrero, at 490–1,050 metres (1,610–3,440 ft) elevation. It has been seen mostly in disturbed habitats that were previously forest.
