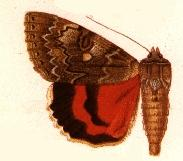

Scientific classification
- Kingdom: Animalia
- Phylum: Arthropoda
- Class: Insecta
- Order: Lepidoptera
- Superfamily: Noctuoidea
- Family: Erebidae
- Genus: Catocala
- Species: C. californica

Binomial name
- Catocala californica W. H. Edwards, 1864

Synonyms
- Catocala mariana Strecker, 1874 (preocc. Catocala mariana Rambur, 1858); Catocala erichi Brower, 1976; Catocala edwardsi Kusnezov, 1903; Catocala elizabeth Cass, 1918; Catocala eldoradensis Beutenmueller, 1907

= Catocala californica =

Species of moth

Catocala californica is a moth of the family Erebidae first described by William Henry Edwards in 1864. It is found in western North America from British Columbia and Alberta south through Washington and Oregon to California.

The wingspan is about 65 mm. Adults are on wing from June to August depending on the location.

The larvae feed on Juglans nigra and Salix species.

== Subspecies ==
Former subspecies Catocala californica edwardsi and Catocala californica elizabeth are now considered synonyms.
