= Calliandra biflora =

Scientific classification
- Kingdom: Plantae
- Clade: Tracheophytes
- Clade: Angiosperms
- Clade: Eudicots
- Clade: Rosids
- Order: Fabales
- Family: Fabaceae
- Subfamily: Caesalpinioideae
- Clade: Mimosoid clade
- Genus: Calliandra
- Species: C. biflora

Binomial name
- Calliandra biflora Tharp

Species of legume

Calliandra biflora, known commonly as the twoflower stickpea, is a species of flowering plants of the genus Calliandra in the family Fabaceae.
