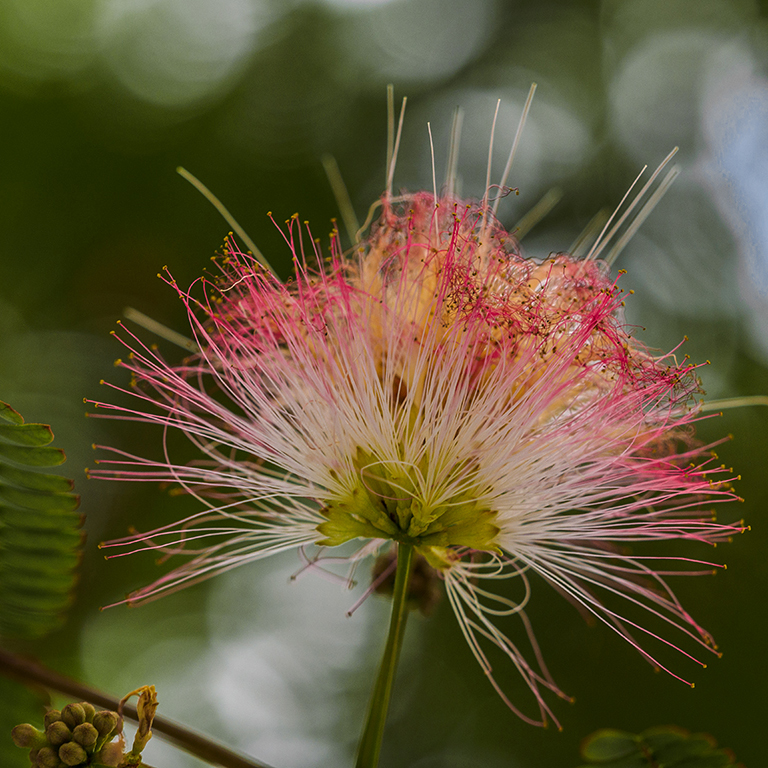

Scientific classification
- Kingdom: Plantae
- Clade: Tracheophytes
- Clade: Angiosperms
- Clade: Eudicots
- Clade: Rosids
- Order: Fabales
- Family: Fabaceae
- Subfamily: Caesalpinioideae
- Clade: Mimosoid clade
- Genus: Calliandra
- Species: C. parvifolia

Binomial name
- Calliandra parvifolia Speg.

Synonyms
- Annesleya parvifolia Britton [Spelling variant]; Anneslia myriophylla (Benth.) Lindm.; Anneslia parvifolia Britton; Calliandra bicolor Benth.; Calliandra falcifera Ducke; Calliandra microcalyx Harms; Calliandra peckoltii Benth.; Feuillea multifoliata Kuntze; Feuillea peckoltii Kuntze; Feuilleea bicolor (Benth.) Kuntze; Feuilleea multifoliolata Kuntze; Feuilleea myriophylla (Benth.) Kuntze; Inga parvifolia Hook. & Arn.

= Calliandra parvifolia =

Species of legume

Calliandra parvifolia is a species of flowering plants of the genus Calliandra in the family Fabaceae.
