= Calliandra laxa =

Conservation status
- Least Concern (IUCN 3.1)

Scientific classification
- Kingdom: Plantae
- Clade: Tracheophytes
- Clade: Angiosperms
- Clade: Eudicots
- Clade: Rosids
- Order: Fabales
- Family: Fabaceae
- Subfamily: Caesalpinioideae
- Clade: Mimosoid clade
- Genus: Calliandra
- Species: C. laxa

Binomial name
- Calliandra laxa (Willd.) Benth.

Synonyms
- Acacia laxa Willd.; Feuilleea laxa (Willd.) Kuntze; Mimosa laxa (Willd.) Poir.

Species of legume

Calliandra laxa is a species of flowering plants of the genus Calliandra in the family Fabaceae.

It is usually found in between Mexico and South Tropical America. It is a shrub or tree and grows primarily in the seasonally dry tropical biome.

The species was first published in Trans. Linn. Soc. London 30: 551 (1875)
