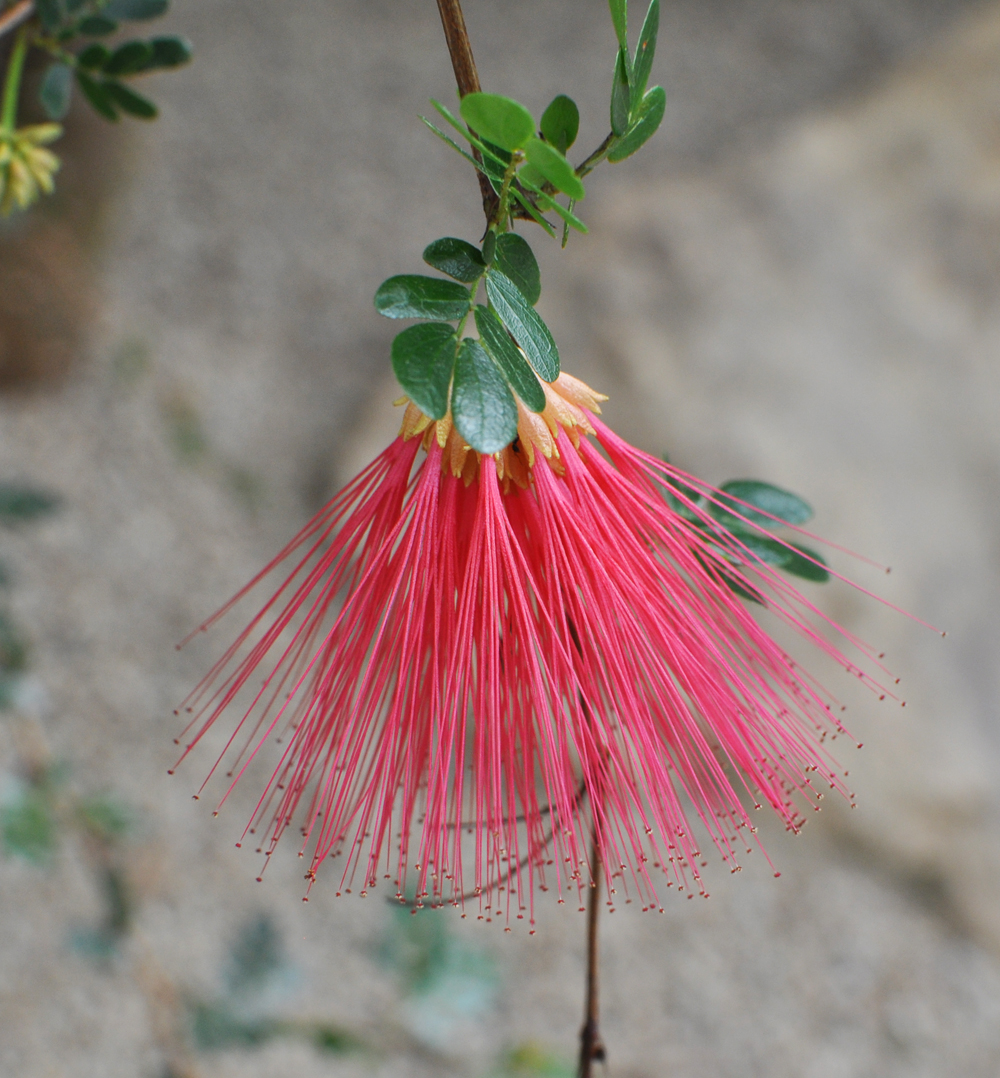

Scientific classification
- Kingdom: Plantae
- Clade: Tracheophytes
- Clade: Angiosperms
- Clade: Eudicots
- Clade: Rosids
- Order: Fabales
- Family: Fabaceae
- Subfamily: Caesalpinioideae
- Clade: Mimosoid clade
- Genus: Calliandra
- Species: C. purpurea

Binomial name
- Calliandra purpurea (Carl Linnaeus) Benth.

Synonyms
- Anneslia purpurea (L.) Britton; Calliandra conoensis H.Karst. [Spelling variant]; Calliandra coroensis H.Karst.; Calliandra obtusifolia (Willd.) H.Karst.; Calliandra slaneae R.A.Howard; Feuilleea purpurea Kuntze; Inga obtusifolia Willd.; Inga purpurea (L.) Willd.; Mimosa obtusifolia Poir.; Mimosa purpurea L.

= Calliandra purpurea =

Species of legume

Calliandra purpurea, the soldierwood, is a species of flowering plants of the genus Calliandra in the family Fabaceae.
