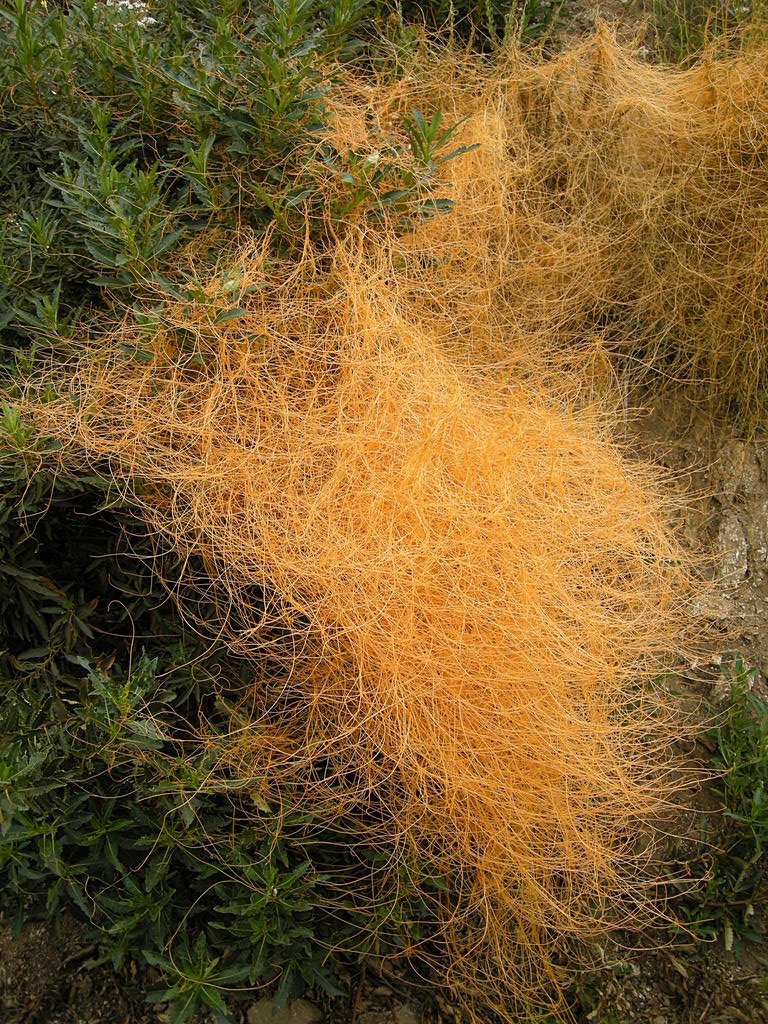

Scientific classification
- Kingdom: Plantae
- Clade: Tracheophytes
- Clade: Angiosperms
- Clade: Eudicots
- Clade: Asterids
- Order: Solanales
- Family: Convolvulaceae
- Genus: Cuscuta
- Species: C. californica

Binomial name
- Cuscuta californica Hook. & Arn.

= Cuscuta californica =

Species of flowering plant

Cuscuta californica is a species of dodder known by the common names chaparral dodder and California dodder. This is an annual parasitic plant that may resemble fine strands of spaghetti or twine strewn across other species in its habitat. A mature plant of this species may fulfill all of its food and water needs from the host plant, but they rarely kill their host. It is native to western United States and Baja California in Mexico.

== Description ==
Cuscuta californica is a parasitic vine that resembles a pile of yellow-orange straw wrapped tightly around its host plant. It is mostly stem; the leaves are reduced to scales on the stem's surface, since they are not needed for photosynthesis while the dodder is obtaining nutrients from its host.

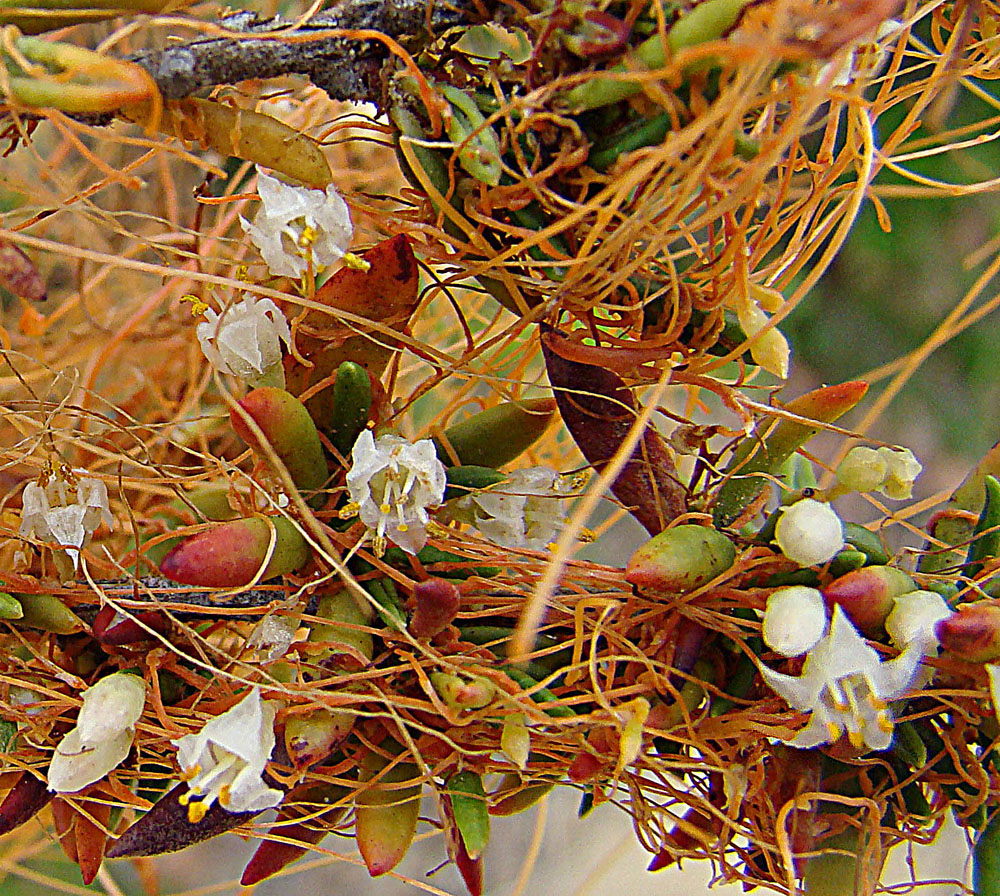
Detail of the flowers

It bears tiny white flowers which are only about 3 to 5 millimeters wide, and spheric or ovid fruits which are 1.5-2.2 millimeters wide. The flowers can be used as a diagnostic feature in determining the species of dodder; on C. californica, the calyx length is 3/4 to equaling the length of the corolla. The bell-shaped corolla lobes are also equaling or longer than the corolla tube, and the filaments are 0.6 to 1.1 mm long.

=== Host interaction and parasitism ===
Like all dodders, Cuscuta californica is a holoparasite that detects suitable hosts by means of "foraging" patterns, as dodder seedlings can detect the volatile compounds emitted by host plants. Dodder seedlings are even capable of "selecting" host plants based on their compounds emitted. The plant then coils and forms special organs called haustoria, which exert mechanical pressure and produce enzymes to penetrate cell walls. This process creates a direct connection between the host plant’s vascular bundles and the dodder, enabling the extraction and bidirectional transfer of macromolecules such as mRNA.

=== Phenology ===
Although this species spends most of its life without any contact with the soil, it is borne from a normal, rooted seed. It tends to germinate in the spring, typically when soil temperatures reach 16°C (60°F). The seed contains minimal energy reserves, meaning seedlings must locate and parasitize a host within a matter of days. After it attaches itself to the host, the grounded root dies and the plant becomes completely dependent on the host for nutrition. This species flowers from spring to autumn and creates thousands of seeds in summer and late fall. Around 5% of these seeds germinate within a year of its production while the rest can remain dormant for up to 20 years in response to environmental conditions.

== Taxonomy ==
There are three recognized varieties of this species:

- Cuscuta California var. apiculata – This variety has an ovoid to conic shaped ovary and fruit, with a pointed tip, and one seed.
- Cuscuta californica var. californica – This variety has a spheric to spheric-depressed shaped ovary and fruit, with 2 to 4 seeds, and does not have a papillate perianth or pedicels.
- Cuscuta California var. papillosa – This variety has a spheric to spheric-depressed shaped ovary and fruit, with 2 to 4 seeds, and does have a densely papillate perianth and pedicels.

== Distribution and habitat ==
This species is found throughout the western United States and parts of Mexico. In the United States, it is found in Arizona, California, Nevada, Oregon, Utah and Washington. In Mexico, it is primarily found in the northwestern portion of the state of Baja California. It grows on numerous herbs and shrubs such as black sage, buckwheat, and deerweed from various habitats, including sandy desert areas, chaparral, coastal sage scrub, grasslands, forests of Pinus ponderosa, and weedy, partially disturbed areas like roadsides. Under these circumstances, they are not considered a noxious weed, but do become problematic when inhabiting agricultural fields and nursery crops. It was also discovered in Flowood, Mississippi on August 12, 2022.
