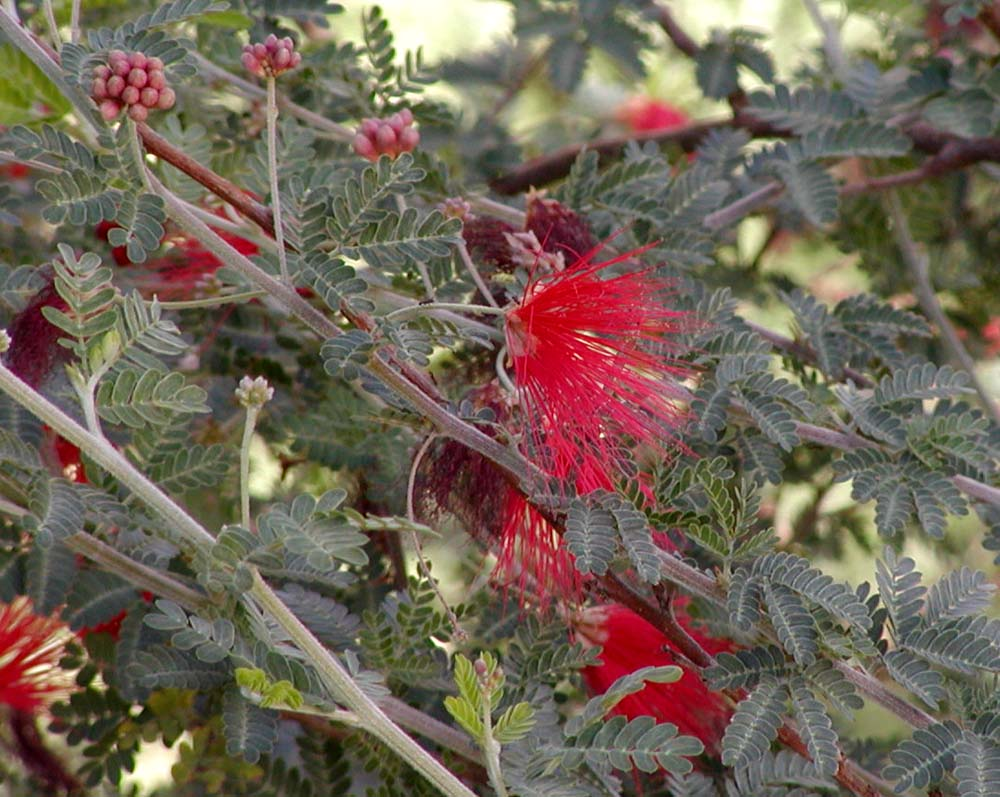

Scientific classification
- Kingdom: Plantae
- Clade: Tracheophytes
- Clade: Angiosperms
- Clade: Eudicots
- Clade: Rosids
- Order: Fabales
- Family: Fabaceae
- Subfamily: Caesalpinioideae
- Clade: Mimosoid clade
- Genus: Calliandra
- Species: C. californica

Binomial name
- Calliandra californica Benth.

Synonyms
- Anneslia californica Britton & Rose; Anneslia mixta Britton & Rose; Anneslia mucronulata Britton & Rose; Feuilleea californica Kuntze

= Calliandra californica =

Species of legume

Calliandra californica, the Baja fairy duster, is an evergreen, woody shrub, native to Baja California, Mexico. In Spanish, the plant is also known vernacularly as tabardillo, zapotillo or chuparosa. The flowers, which appear in early summer, have clusters of red stamens. The shrub is usually 0.6–1.8 metres (2 ft 0 in – 5 ft 11 in) in height and has bipinnate leaves. The leaves have been described as "fern-like." Leaves close at night time.

Calliandra californica is cold tolerant to temperatures of 22 °F (−6 °C), though its roots will tolerate temperatures as low as 5 °F (−15 °C). It grows best in full sun. C. californica is very drought tolerant, needing only 10 inches (250 mm) of water every year. However, additional watering will encourage C. californica to bloom through summer and again in the fall.

Propagation of C. californica is done through "acid scarification" or vegetative cutting. Seed pods from this plant look like "snow peas" and when ripe, they explode. The pods are flat and about 2 inches (51 mm) long. After ejecting seeds, the curled open pods remain attached to the plant for some time.

Calliandra californica attracts both bees and hummingbirds.

Along with many other legumes and leadworts (Plumbago), it is a host plant for the Marine Blue caterpillar (Leptotes marina).

In landscaping, it is suggested that C. californica is used in borders or foreground plantings, as an island accent or even in containers.

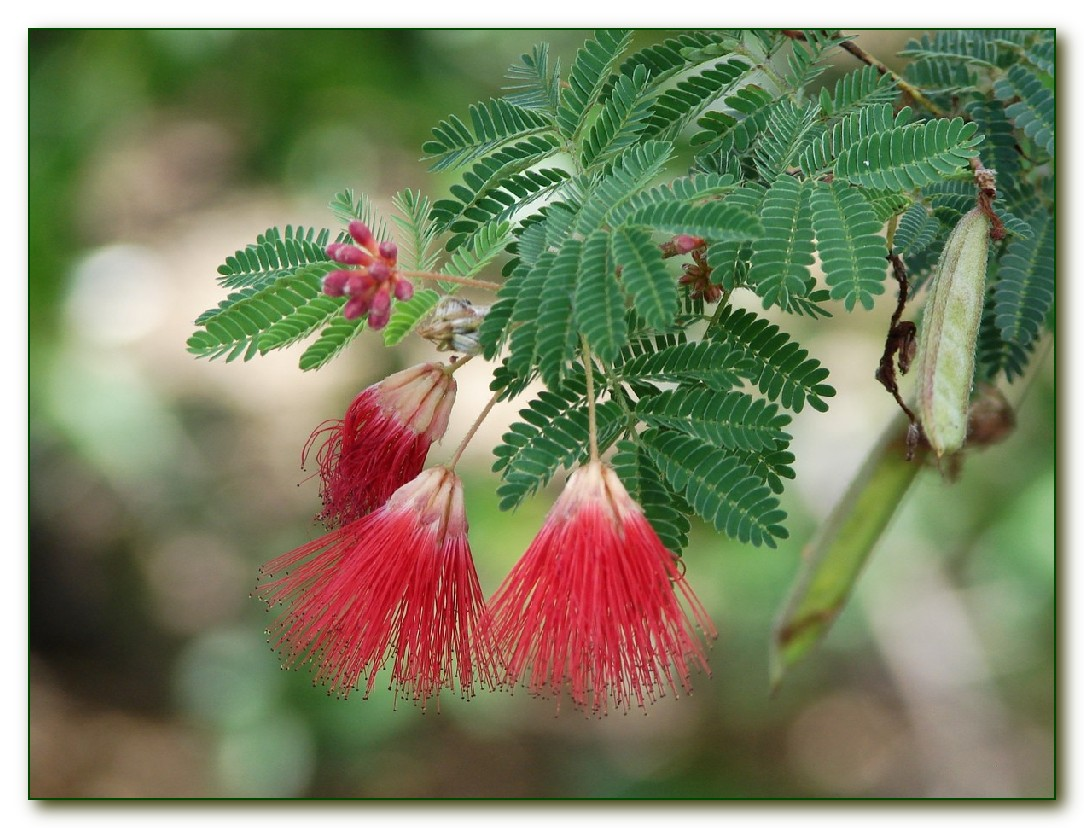
Flower and seed pods evident.

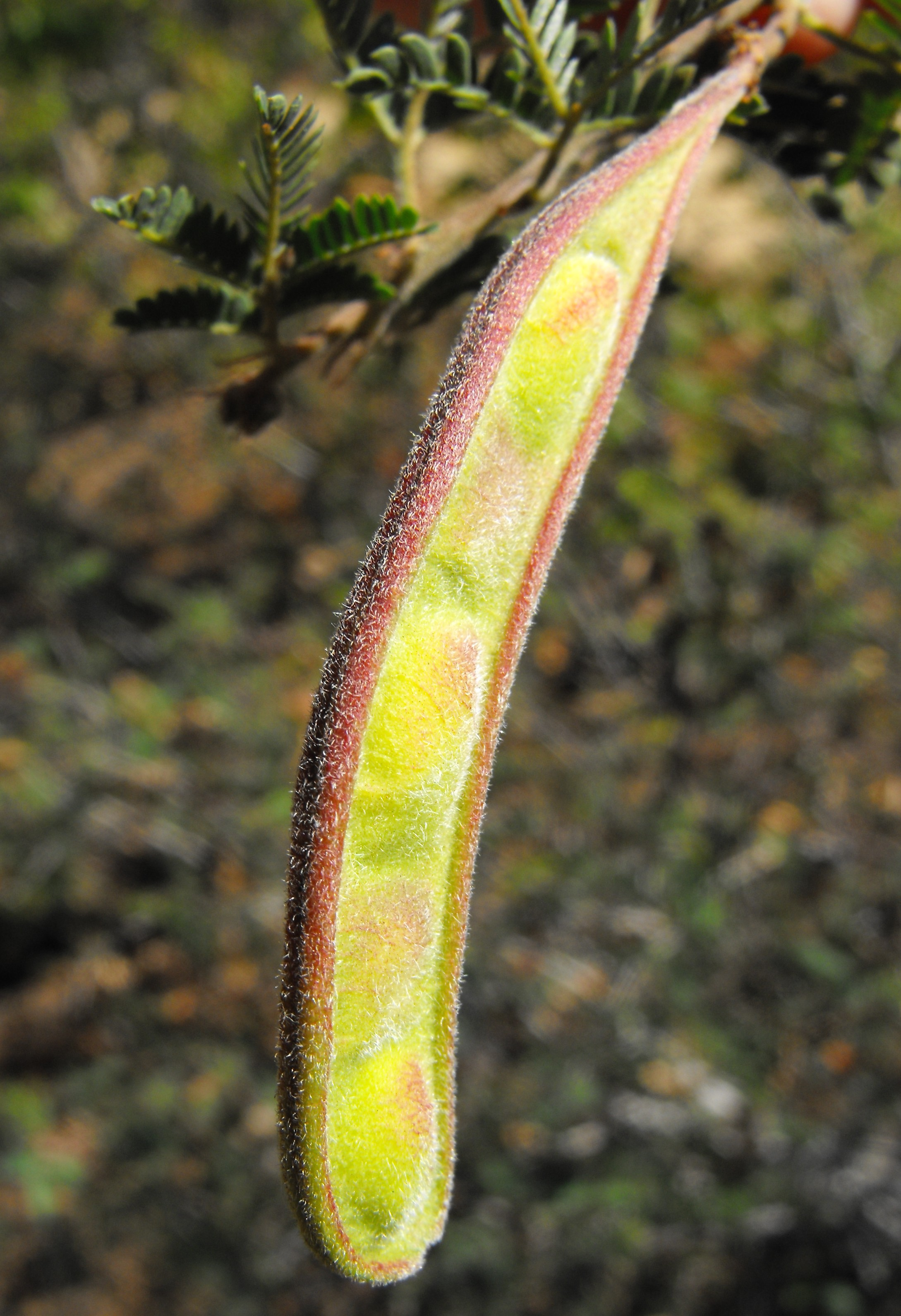
Fruit (pod) of the Calliandra californica.

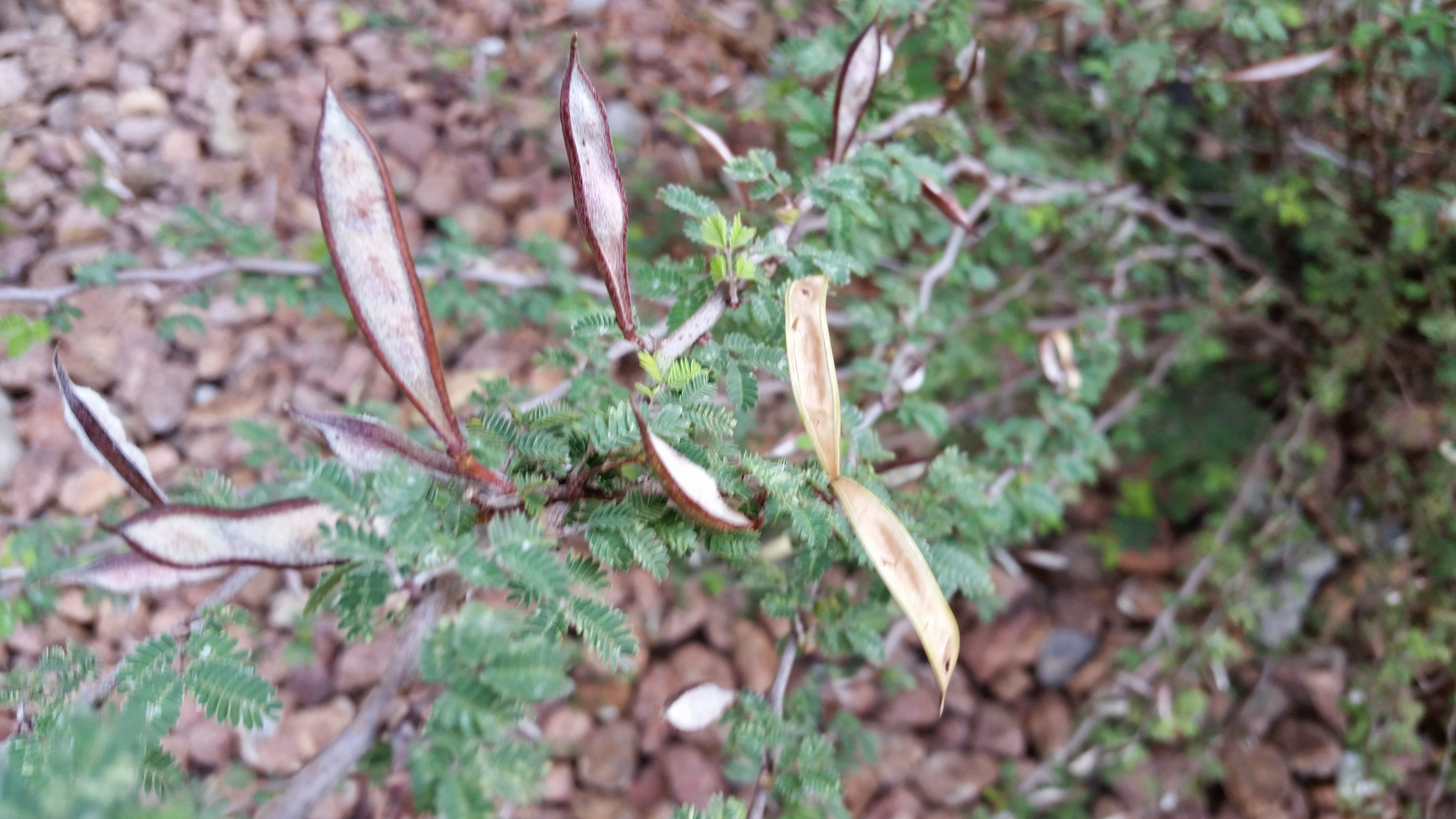
Burst seed pods on branch of C. californica.
