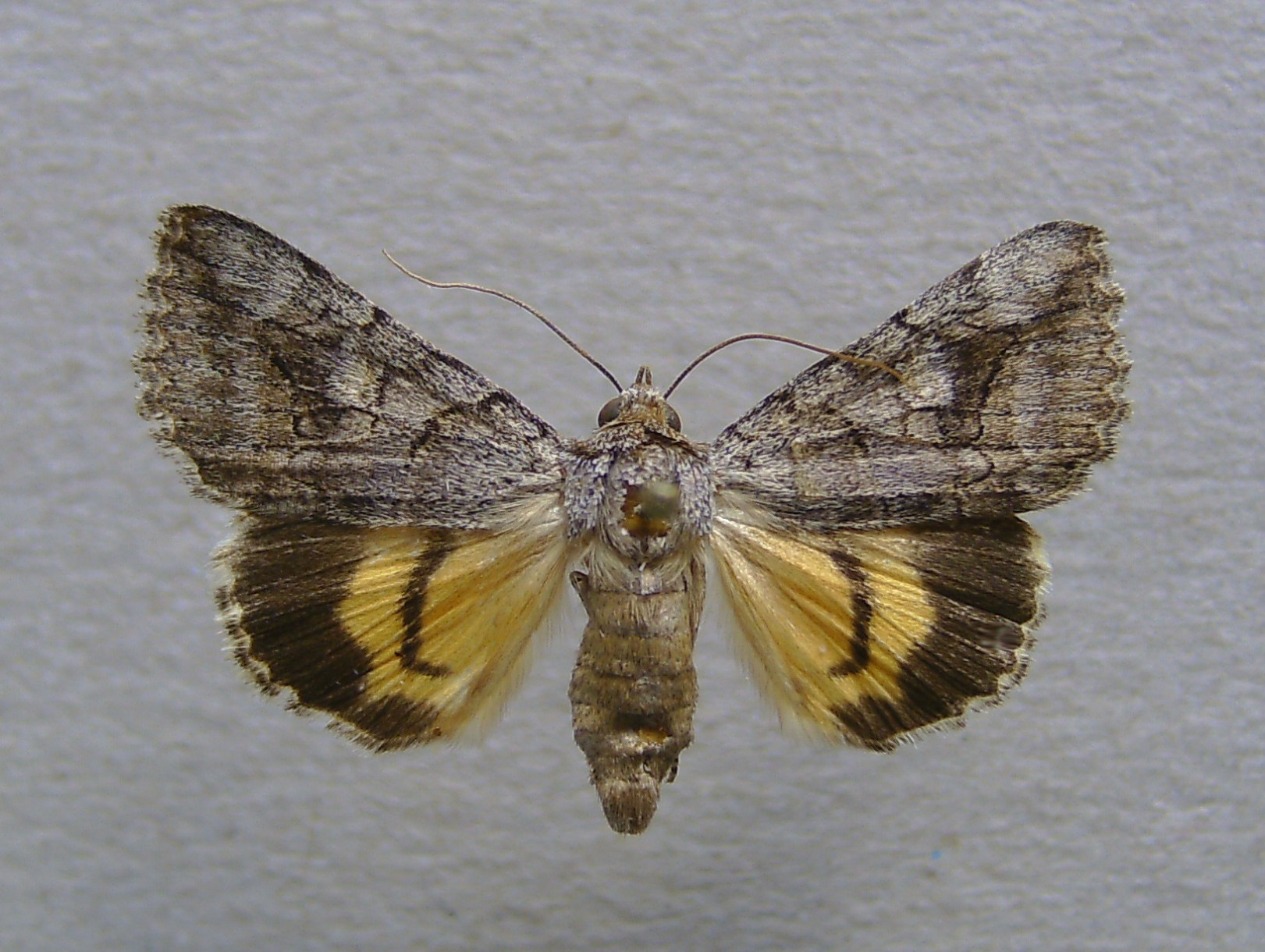

Scientific classification
- Kingdom: Animalia
- Phylum: Arthropoda
- Class: Insecta
- Order: Lepidoptera
- Superfamily: Noctuoidea
- Family: Erebidae
- Genus: Catocala
- Species: C. mariana

Binomial name
- Catocala mariana Rambur, 1858

= Catocala mariana =

Species of moth

Catocala mariana is a moth of the family Erebidae first described by Jules Pierre Rambur in 1858. It is found in Portugal and Spain.
