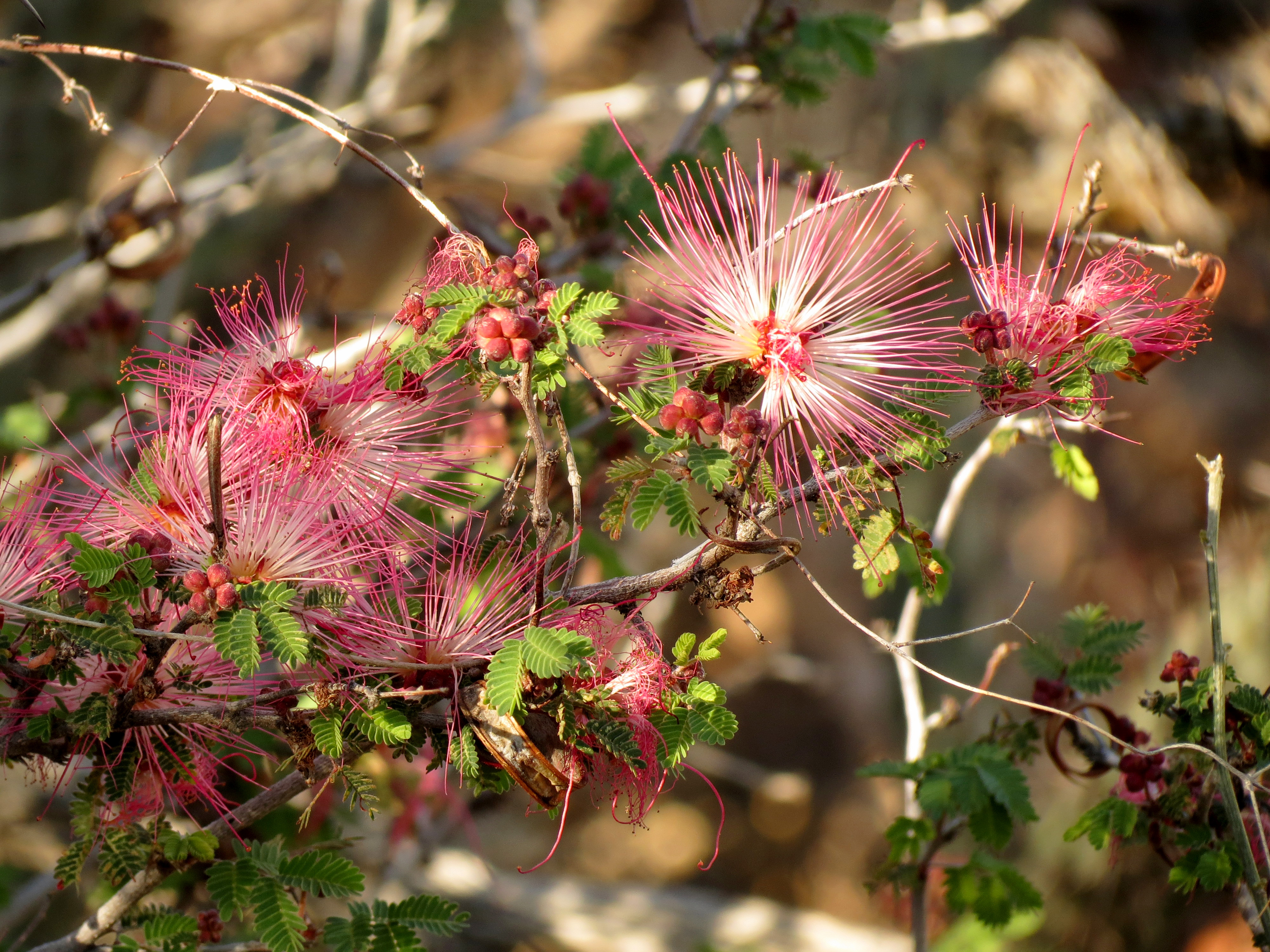

Conservation status
- Secure (NatureServe)

Scientific classification
- Kingdom: Plantae
- Clade: Tracheophytes
- Clade: Angiosperms
- Clade: Eudicots
- Clade: Rosids
- Order: Fabales
- Family: Fabaceae
- Subfamily: Caesalpinioideae
- Clade: Mimosoid clade
- Genus: Calliandra
- Species: C. eriophylla

Binomial name
- Calliandra eriophylla Benth.

Synonyms
- Anneslia eriophylla (Benth.) Britton; Calliandra chamaedrys Engelm.; Calliandra conferta A.Gray; Feuilleea eriophylla Kuntze

= Calliandra eriophylla =

Species of legume

Calliandra eriophylla, commonly known as fairy duster, is a low spreading shrub which is native to deserts and arid grasslands in California, Arizona, New Mexico, Texas, and Mexico.

The flowers, which appear between late winter and late spring, have dense clusters of pale to deep pink stamens and are about 5 cm (2 in) wide.

The shrub is usually between 20 and 50 cm (8 and 20 in) high and has bipinnate leaves.

Alternative common names for this species include mock mesquite and mesquitella.

== Description ==
The Calliandra genus has over 250 species, with only three being native to the southwest. Found in regions such as Northern Mexico Sonoran and Chihuahuan deserts along with Southern California and Southwestern New Mexico. This spectacular plant gets its name as a reference to its "showy appearance". The Calliandra plants thrive in the heat and once established can endure extreme droughts. They can survive being watered as little as once to twice a week.

== Name origin ==
The genus name, Calliandra, means "beautiful-stamens". The species name, eriophylla is Greek for "wooly leaf". Some of its common names are fairy duster, false mesquite, stickpea, hairy-leaved Calliandra, pink mimosa, pink-flowered acacia, mesquitilla, plumita, gavia, huajillo, cabeza angel, cabelleto de angel, cabeze de angel, and cosahui.

== Identification ==
Typically, the Calliandra is a low growing plant, prostrate toward upper elevation, and at lower elevation grows erect and bushy. The Calliandra grows as a loosely branched shrub that once matured, can reach heights of four to five feet in height and twice as wide in width. Pruning for this particular plant is not necessary; however, if one chooses to prune it can result in making the plant much denser. Found in this plant are spherical flowers found in cream, pink, or white one and one quarter to two inches in diameter containing several clusters of flowers with long slender stamens. The stamens in the plant are usually straight but occasionally found curled.

== Habitat- growth habitat ==
Calliandra eriophylla usually grows in dry areas. The fairy duster can survive with little water, and with varied amounts of exposure to the sun. However, the plant blooms more when it is exposed to the sun than when it has little exposure to the sun. The fairy duster depends on soil that is dry, contains gravel, and its naturally alkaline. It is usually found on open hillsides and desert washes and slopes that fall below 5,000 feet (1,500 m). These plants can grow to be up to 2 to 4 feet (60 to 120 cm) wide and 1 to 3 feet tall. During the spring and summer the plant begins to bloom pale to vibrant pink flowers.

== Distribution ==
Calliandra eriophylla is distributed across a wide range of arid and dry areas. It is most commonly located in the Southwestern United States and Northern Mexico. This includes places like southern California, New Mexico, Texas, and Arizona. These plants are native to the Arizona region and as such can survive in desert areas with minimal water needs. This allows it to thrive in areas like the Mohave Desert and Sonoran Desert and other areas with weather similar to that of Southern Arizona. The preferred elevation for growth of fairy duster is between 1,000 and 5,000 feet (300 and 1,500 m).

== Seeding and pollination ==
The Calliandra eriophylla is fairly common in the deserts of the southwestern United States. Therefore, it has a number of different pollinators. Some of the primary pollinators are bees, flies, butterflies, and hummingbirds. The fairy duster is able to attract these pollinators because it produces a considerable amount of nectar of about 2.17 mg of sugar per flower. The pollination allows the seed pods to begin to grow. Eventually when they reach maturity the pods, which are dehiscent, will break open and launch the seeds in an attempt to propagate the plant. One of the main threats to the seeds is that many animals eat the seeds before they can develop including small birds like quails which may even pry open unpopped pods.

== Animals ==
The fairy duster flowers are a pale pink color and are an attraction to animals that live in the desert. This plant becomes a source of food for the deer that roam in the desert or hillsides. The plant also attracts butterflies, bees and hummingbirds for nectar when the flowers are blooming.

== Other sources ==
- Spellenberg, R. (1979) Field Guide to North American Wildflowers - Western Region, National Audubon Society.
- Calliandra eriophylla: The University of Arizona Pima County Cooperative Extension
- "Calliandra eriophylla". Germplasm Resources Information Network. Agricultural Research Service, United States Department of Agriculture.
