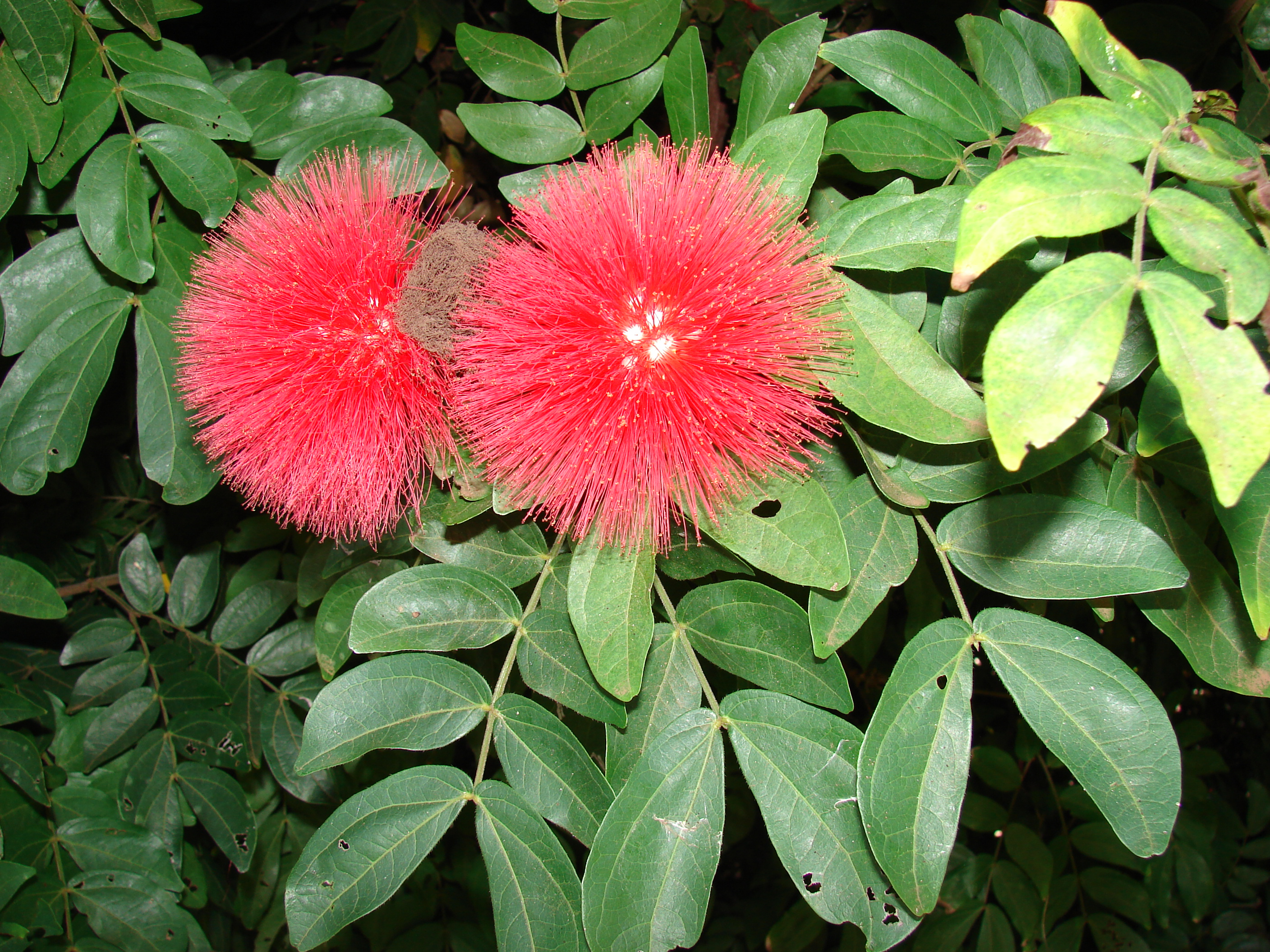
- Calliandra haematocephala

Scientific classification
- Kingdom: Plantae
- Clade: Embryophytes
- Clade: Tracheophytes
- Clade: Angiosperms
- Clade: Eudicots
- Clade: Rosids
- Order: Fabales
- Family: Fabaceae
- Subfamily: Caesalpinioideae
- Clade: Mimosoid clade
- Genus: Calliandra; Benth.

Species
- See text.

Synonyms
- Anneslia Salisb.; Clelia Casar.; Codonandra H.Karst.; Guinetia L.Rico & M.Sousa

= Calliandra =

Genus of legumes

Calliandra is a genus of flowering plants in the pea family, Fabaceae, in the mimosoid clade of the subfamily Caesalpinioideae. It contains about 140 species that are native to tropical and subtropical regions of the Americas.

== Description ==
The genus comprises herbaceous perennial plants, shrubs, and rarely small trees, growing 0.5–6 m (1.5–19.5 feet) tall, with bipinnate leaves. The flowers are produced in cylindrical or globose inflorescences and have numerous long slender stamens which give rise to the common names powder-puff, powder puff plant, and fairy duster. These plants flower all year round, but the best blooming is in spring and summer. They can be easily pruned.

Calliandra are often fed on by caterpillars, such as the larvae of statira sulphur (Aphrissa statira). It is available in many vibrant colours such as pink, white, etc.

== Species ==
The following is an alphabetical listing of the 153 species in the genus Genus that are accepted by Plants of the World Online as of August 2026

- Calliandra aeschynomenoides Benth.
- Calliandra angustifolia Spruce ex Benth.
- Calliandra antioquiae Barneby
- Calliandra asplenioides (Nees) Benth.
- Calliandra bahiana Renvoize
- Calliandra belizensis (Britton & Rose) Standl.
- Calliandra bella (Mart. ex Spreng.) Benth.
- Calliandra biflora Tharp
- Calliandra bifoliolata H.M.Hern. & Ortíz-Rodr.
- Calliandra bijuga Rose
- Calliandra blanchetii Benth.
- Calliandra bombycina Spruce ex Benth.
- Calliandra brenesii Standl.
- Calliandra brevicaulis Micheli
- Calliandra bromelioides E.R.Souza & L.P.Queiroz
- Calliandra caeciliae Harms
- Calliandra californica Benth.
- Calliandra calothyrsus Meisn.
- Calliandra calycina Benth.
- Calliandra carcerea Standl. & Steyerm.
- Calliandra carrascana Barneby
- Calliandra chilensis Benth.
- Calliandra chulumania Barneby
- Calliandra coccinea Renvoize
- Calliandra colimae Barneby
- Calliandra comosa (Sw.) Benth.
- Calliandra concinna Barneby
- Calliandra coriacea (Humb. & Bonpl. ex Willd.) Benth.
- Calliandra crassipes Benth.
- Calliandra cruegeri Griseb.
- Calliandra cualensis H.M.Hern.
- Calliandra × cumbucana Renvoize
- Calliandra debilis Renvoize
- Calliandra depauperata Benth.
- Calliandra dolichopoda H.M.Hern.
- Calliandra duckei Barneby
- Calliandra dysantha Benth.
- Calliandra elegans Renvoize
- Calliandra enervis (Britton) Urb.
- Calliandra emarginata (Humb. & Bonpl. ex Willd.) Benth.
- Calliandra enervis (Britton) Urb.
- Calliandra eriophylla Benth.
- Calliandra erubescens Renvoize
- Calliandra erythrocephala H.M.Hern. & M.Sousa
- Calliandra estebanensis H.M.Hern.
- Calliandra falcata Benth.
- Calliandra fasciculata Benth.
- Calliandra feioana Renvoize
- Calliandra fernandesii Barneby
- Calliandra foliolosa Benth.
- Calliandra fuscipila Harms
- Calliandra ganevii Barneby
- Calliandra gardneri Benth.
- Calliandra geraisensis E.R.Souza & L.P.Queiroz
- Calliandra germana Barneby
- Calliandra gilbertii Thulin & Hunde
- Calliandra glaziovii Taub.
- Calliandra glomerulata H.Karst.
- Calliandra glyphoxylon Spruce ex Benth.
- Calliandra grandiflora (L'Hér.) Benth.
- Calliandra grandifolia P.H.Allen
- Calliandra guildingii Benth.
- Calliandra haematocephala Hassk.
- Calliandra haematomma (Bertero ex DC.) Benth.
- Calliandra harrisii (Lindl.) Benth.
- Calliandra hintonii Barneby
- Calliandra hirsuta (G.Don) Benth.
- Calliandra hirsuticaulis Harms
- Calliandra hirtiflora Benth.
- Calliandra hispidulocarpa H.M.Hern. & Gómez-Hin.
- Calliandra houstoniana (Mill.) Standl.
- Calliandra humilis Benth.
- Calliandra hygrophila Mackinder & G.P.Lewis
- Calliandra hymenaeoides (Rich.) Benth.
- Calliandra iligna Barneby
- Calliandra imbricata E.R.Souza & L.P.Queiroz
- Calliandra imperialis Barneby
- Calliandra involuta Mackinder & G.P.Lewis
- Calliandra iselyi B.L.Turner
- Calliandra jariensis Barneby
- Calliandra juzepczukii Standl.
- Calliandra laevis Rose
- Calliandra lanata Benth.
- Calliandra laxa (Willd.) Benth.
- Calliandra leptopoda Benth.
- Calliandra lewisii E.R.Souza & L.P.Queiroz
- Calliandra linearis Benth.
- Calliandra lintea Barneby
- Calliandra longipedicellata (McVaugh) Macqueen & H.M.Hern.
- Calliandra longipes Benth.
- Calliandra longipinna Benth.
- Calliandra luetzelburgii Harms
- Calliandra macqueenii Barneby
- Calliandra macrocalyx Harms
- Calliandra magdalenae (Bertero ex DC.) Benth.
- Calliandra mayana H.M.Hern.
- Calliandra medellinensis Britton & Rose ex Britton & Killip
- Calliandra molinae Standl.
- Calliandra mollissima (Humb. & Bonpl. ex Willd.) Benth.
- Calliandra mucugeana Renvoize
- Calliandra nebulosa Barneby
- Calliandra oroboensis E.R.Souza & L.P.Queiroz
- Calliandra paganuccii E.R.Souza
- Calliandra pakaraimensis R.S.Cowan
- Calliandra palmeri S.Watson
- Calliandra paniculata C.D.Adams
- Calliandra parviflora Benth.
- Calliandra parvifolia (Hook. & Arn.) Speg.
- Calliandra paterna Barneby
- Calliandra pauciflora (A.Rich.) Griseb.
- Calliandra pedicellata Benth.
- Calliandra peninsularis Rose
- Calliandra physocalyx H.M.Hern. & M.Sousa
- Calliandra pilgeriana Harms
- Calliandra pilocarpa A.E.Estrada, Rebman & Villarreal
- Calliandra pittieri Standl.
- Calliandra pityophila Barneby
- Calliandra prostrata Benth.
- Calliandra purdiei Benth.
- Calliandra purpurea (L.) Benth.
- Calliandra quetzal (Donn.Sm.) Donn.Sm.
- Calliandra redacta (J.H.Ross) Thulin & Hunde
- Calliandra renvoizeana Barneby
- Calliandra rhodocephala Donn.Sm.
- Calliandra ricoana H.M.Hern. & R.Duno
- Calliandra rigida Benth.
- Calliandra riparia Pittier
- Calliandra rubescens (M.Martens & Galeotti) Standl.
- Calliandra samik Barneby
- Calliandra santosiana Glaz. ex Barneby
- Calliandra seleri Harms
- Calliandra selloi (Spreng.) J.F.Macbr.
- Calliandra semisepulta Barneby
- Calliandra sesquipedalis McVaugh
- Calliandra sessilis Benth.
- Calliandra silvicola Taub.
- Calliandra sincorana Harms
- Calliandra spinosa Ducke
- Calliandra squarrosa Benth.
- Calliandra staminea (Thunb.) Barneby
- Calliandra stelligera Barneby
- Calliandra subspicata Benth.
- Calliandra surinamensis Benth.
- Calliandra taxifolia (Kunth) Benth.
- Calliandra tehuantepecensis (L.Rico & M.Sousa) E.R.Souza & L.P.Queiroz
- Calliandra tergemina (L.) Benth.
- Calliandra tolimensis Taub. ex Hieron.
- Calliandra trinervia Benth.
- Calliandra tsugoides R.S.Cowan
- Calliandra tumbeziana J.F.Macbr.
- Calliandra tweediei Benth.
- Calliandra ulei Harms
- Calliandra umbellifera Benth.
- Calliandra vaupesiana R.S.Cowan
- Calliandra virgata Benth.
- Calliandra viscidula Benth.

=== Formerly placed here ===
- Havardia pallens (Benth.) Britton & Rose (as C. pallens Benth.)
- Viguieranthus alternans (Benth.) Villiers (as C. alternans Benth. and as C. thouarsiana Baill.)
- Zapoteca caracasana (Jacq.) H.M.Hern. (as C. caracasana (Jacq.) Benth.)
- Zapoteca formosa subsp. formosa (as C. formosa (Kunth) Benth. and C. marginata Griseb. ex R.O.Williams)
- Zapoteca formosa subsp. schottii (Torr. & S.Watson) H.M.Hern. (as C. schottii Torr. & S.Watson)
- Zapoteca portoricensis (Jacq.) H.M.Hern. (as C. portoricensis (Jacq.) Benth.)
- Zapoteca tetragona (Willd.) H.M.Hern. (as C. tetragona (Willd.) Benth.)

== Gallery ==
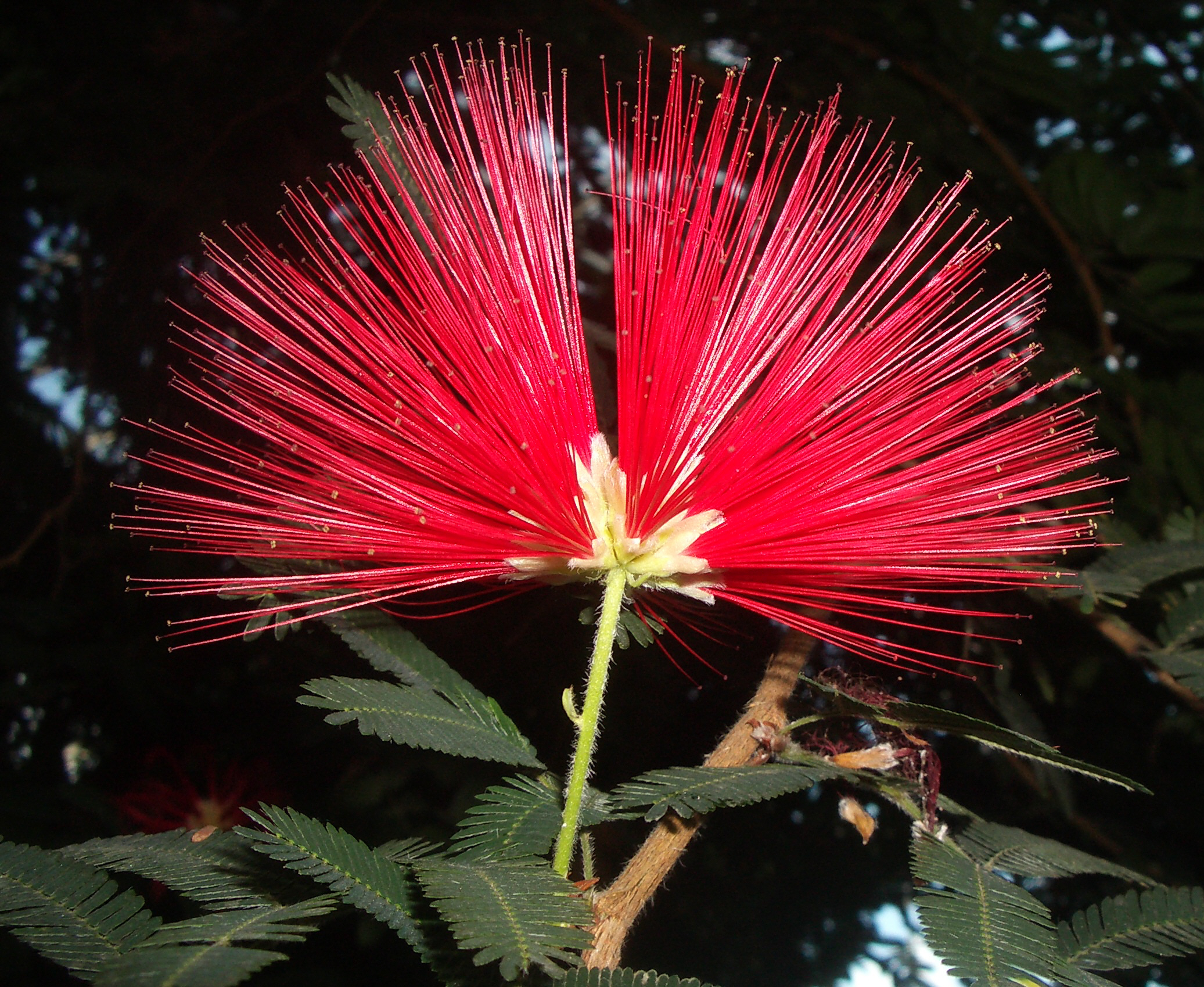
Calliandra tweediei

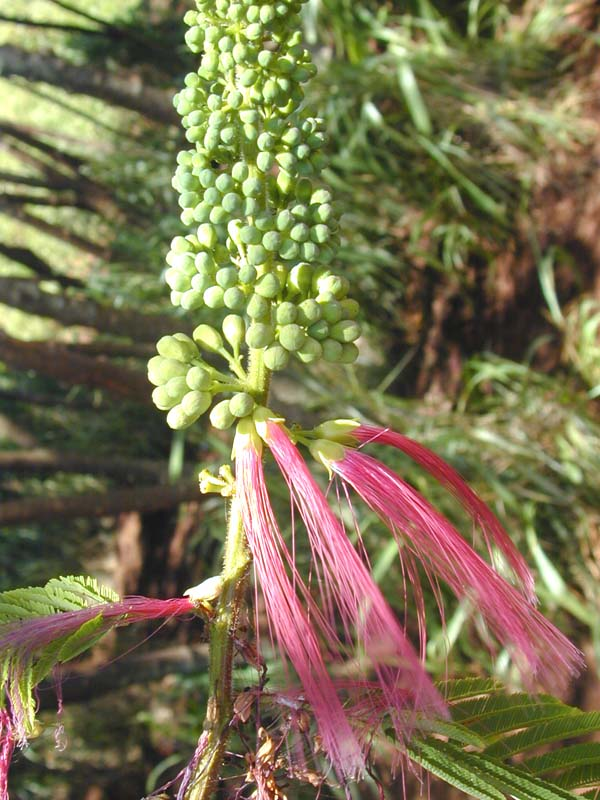
Calliandra calothyrsus

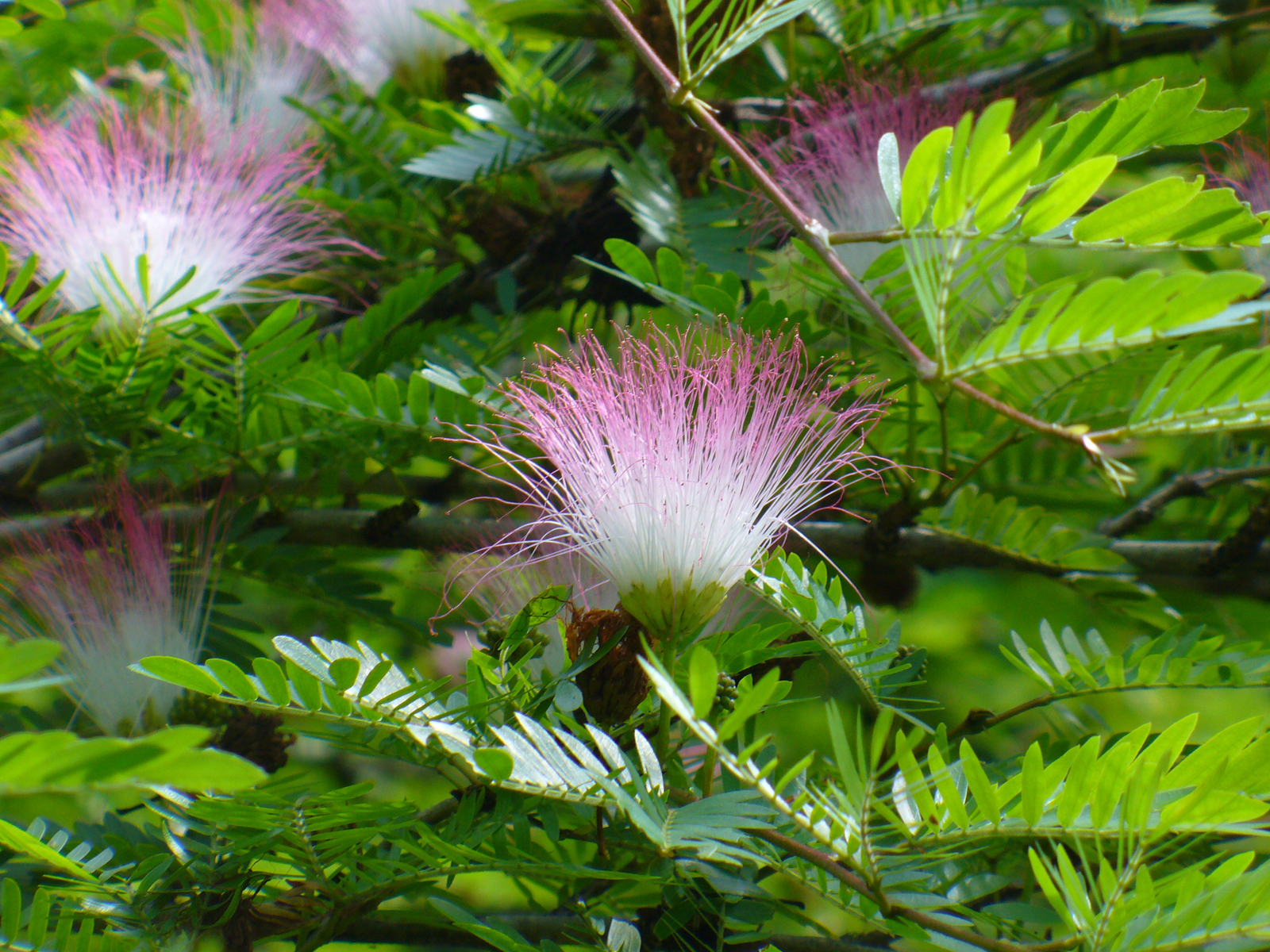
Calliandra surinamensis

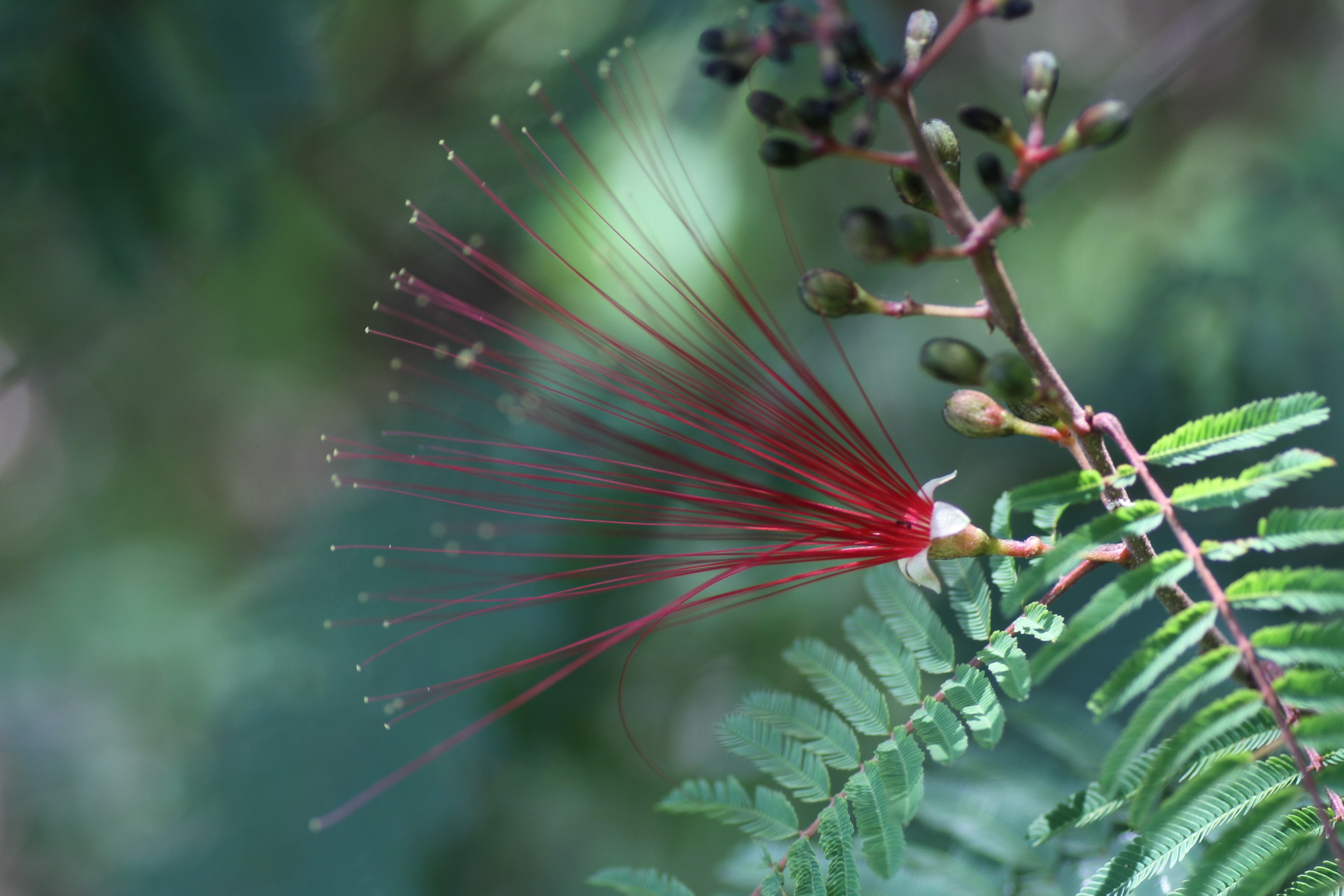
Calliandra houstoniana

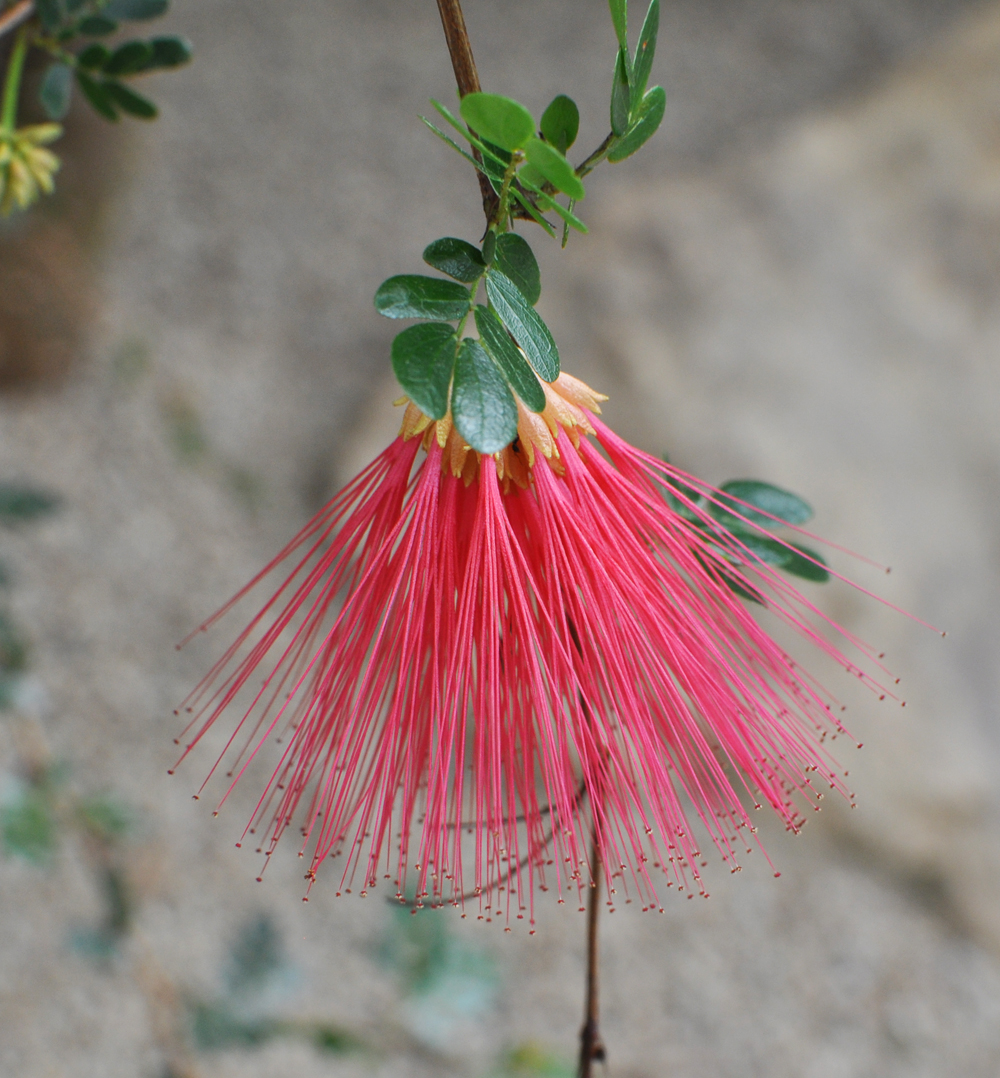
Calliandra purpurea

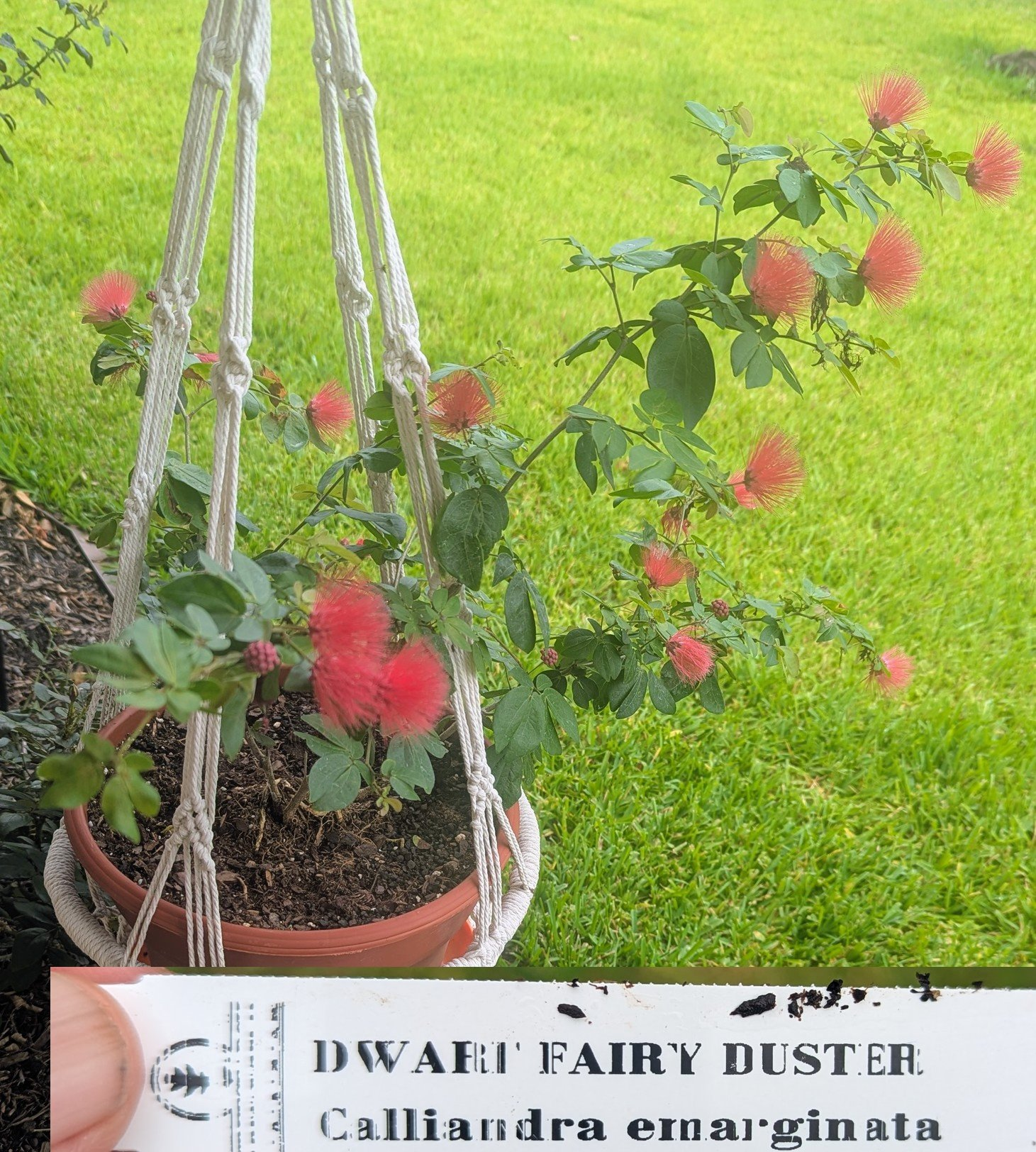
Calliandra emarginata
