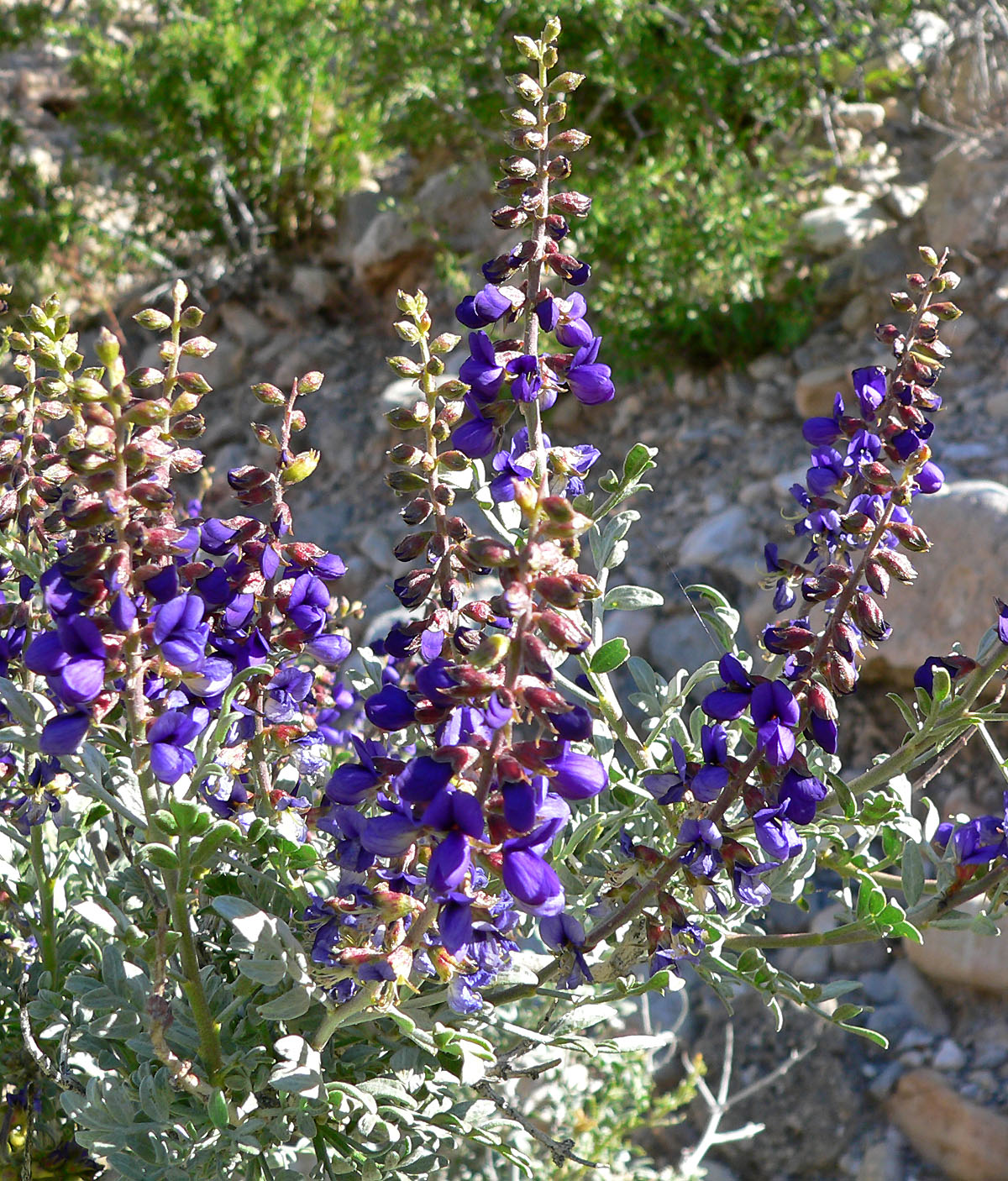
- Psorothamnus fremontii

Scientific classification
- Kingdom: Plantae
- Clade: Tracheophytes
- Clade: Angiosperms
- Clade: Eudicots
- Clade: Rosids
- Order: Fabales
- Family: Fabaceae
- Subfamily: Faboideae
- Tribe: Amorpheae
- Genus: Psorothamnus; Rydb.

Type species
- Psorothamnus emoryi (A.Gray) Rydb.

Species
- 4; see text

Synonyms
- Asagraea Baill.

= Psorothamnus =

Genus of legumes

Psorothamnus is a genus of plants in the legume family. These are shrubs and small trees. Many are known by the general common name indigo bush. Some are referred to as daleas, as this genus was once included in genus Dalea. These are generally thorny, thickly branched, strongly scented bushes. Most species bear lupinlike raceme inflorescences of bright purple legume flowers and gland-rich pods. Psorothamnus species are native to the southwestern United States and northern Mexico.

The genus formerly included additional species, but was found to be paraphyletic, and genus Psorodendron was reinstated to accommodate sections Xylodalea, Capnodendron, and Winnemucca.

== Species ==
Four species are currently accepted.

- Psorothamnus emoryi (A. Gray) Rydb. – dyebush, Emory's indigo bush
- Psorothamnus polydenius (S. Watson) Rydb. – Nevada dalea
- Psorothamnus scoparius (A. Gray) Rydb. – broom dalea
- Psorothamnus thompsoniae (Vail) S.L. Welsh & N.D. Atwood – Thompson's dalea

=== Formerly placed here ===
- Psorodendron arborescens (Torr. ex A.Gray) Rydb., as Psorothamnus arborescens (A. Gray) Barneby
- Psorodendron fremontii (Torr. ex A.Gray) Rydb., as Psorothamnus fremontii (A. Gray) Barneby
- Psorodendron kingii (S.Watson) Rydb., as Psorothamnus kingii (S. Watson) Barneby
- Psorodendron schottii (Torr.) Rydb., as Psorothamnus schottii (Torr.) Barneby
- Psorodendron spinosum (A.Gray) Rydb., as Psorothamnus spinosus (A. Gray) Barneby
