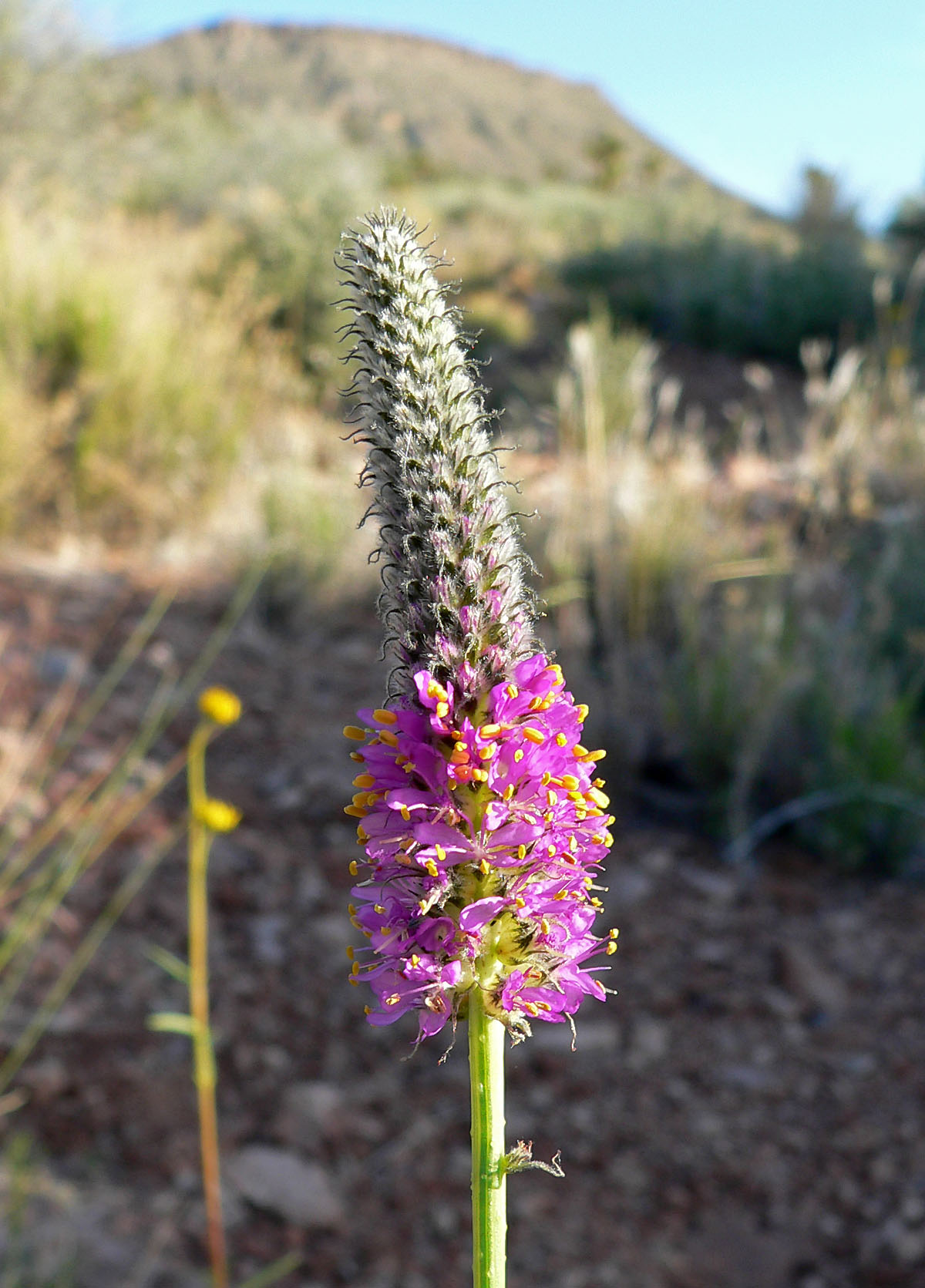

Conservation status
- Apparently Secure (NatureServe)

Scientific classification
- Kingdom: Plantae
- Clade: Embryophytes
- Clade: Tracheophytes
- Clade: Spermatophytes
- Clade: Angiosperms
- Clade: Eudicots
- Clade: Rosids
- Order: Fabales
- Family: Fabaceae
- Subfamily: Faboideae
- Genus: Dalea
- Species: D. searlsiae

Binomial name
- Dalea searlsiae (Gray) Barneby

= Dalea searlsiae =

Species of legume

Dalea searlsiae, commonly known as Searls' prairie clover, is a perennial legume species belonging to the Dalea genus. The species is found through arid regions of the southwestern United States and can survive in low moisture conditions. The species forms symbiotic relationships with nitrogen-fixing bacteria that can improve soil nutrient levels. Its large inflorescence attracts many species of pollinators, and it lacks toxins found in similar legume species. As a result, the species has been considered for use in rangeland restoration and revegetation projects.

== Taxonomy & phylogeny ==
=== Etymology ===
Self-taught British botanist Rupert Charles Barneby formally named the species and is responsible for characterizing much of the endemic new world legume species. The species was named after 19-year-old American botanist Fanny Searls. She was the first to collect a specimen of this species, in 1871.

=== Phylogeny & evolutionary history ===
Searls’ prairie clover belongs to the Dalea genus consisting of American prairie clovers. Dalea species are not true clovers (genus Trifolium) and are only found in the Americas. While both genera belong to the Fabaceae family, they are not immediately related.

Dalea belong to the tribe Amorpheae. The biogeographical history of Amorpheae has resulted in a pan-American distribution. Recent molecular analyses have revealed that the Dalea genus does not constitute a monophyletic clade. All Dalea species descended from a common ancestor, but members of the Marina (false prairie clovers) also fall into this clade. While Marina is a monophyletic group, it falls within the lineage of Dalea, indicating the false prairie clovers are a diverged lineage within the prairie clovers. Hence, Marina and Dalea form a monophyletic lineage with Psorothamnus being the sister group. These three genera are collectively referred to as the Daleoids.

== Distribution & range ==
=== Geographical distribution ===
Searls’ prairie clover is native to the southwestern United States. While the plant is rarer than many legume species, metapopulations can be found in southeastern California, Utah, Nevada, and Arizona. Little is known about their distribution south of US-Mexico border.

=== Habitat and growing conditions ===
Dalea searlsiae is typically found in desert shrublands and forested woodlands. Among forested regions of the southwestern United States, it is abundant in pine-juniper forests and rarer in spruce-fir forests. They are capable of surviving in a wide variety of soil conditions ranging from clay-rich to sandy substrates to rocky flats, however their biological fitness and yield declines in high clay. They are most common in lime-rich soils. D. searlsiae, being an interior species, is found at elevations ranging between 1000-2800m above sea level.

== Description ==
=== Life history & morphology ===
Like most Dalea species, Searls’ prairie clover is a perennial species due to its woody taproot. In spring, the plant regenerates numerous stems sourced from the taproot. Leaves are odd-pinnately compounded (consisting of typically 5 or 7 leaflets, but can range from 3-11 depending on age and health), alternating, and deciduous. Mature plants range from 25–60 cm tall. Flowering occurs in early spring with seed production occurring by early July. The plant forms tiny perfect flowers clustered in a cylindrical spike. Each flower/pod has five stamen, two ovules per pod, and only one seed matures per pod.

== Variation & selection ==
=== Genetic & phenotypic variability ===
The Searls’ prairie clover is a diploid organism with 14 chromosomes (2n = 14). Both genetic drift and gene flow are determinants of the local population structures of Searls’ prairie clover. The species shows significant population-dependent variability in phenotypic characteristics.

=== Local adaptation ===
Phenotypic traits of the species vary with population and geographic location as a result of genetic and environmental factors. The average number of stems per plant can range from 6-23, the number of inflorescences can range from 8-46, and the average height ranges between 21–43 cm. Bhattarai et al. (2011) used principal component analysis to correlate genotype to phenotype and found evidence of some genetic loci being predictive of phenotype. Local Searls’ prairie clover populations have undergone selective pressures leading to local adaptations.

== Ecology ==
Most of the ecology of Searls' prairie clover has been studied in relation to symbioses and herbivory.

=== Rhizobial symbiosis ===
As with most legumes, Searls’ prairie clover forms symbiotic associations with nitrogen-fixing Rhizobia bacteria. This symbiosis improves soil nitrogen content and adds to the nutritional forage quality for herbivorous animals. Commercial inoculant is available for D. searlsiae, but little research has been done to study the rhizobial-legume symbiosis of the species.

=== Pollination ===
While the species is capable of self-pollinating in the absence of pollinators, it prefers to cross-pollinate when possible. Pollination studies have shown self-pollination leads to a significantly reduced seed count with most seeds being inviable. Presence of Searls' prairie clover leads to a diverse pollinator community in the ecosystem.

Bee species are the primary pollinator of D. searlsiae. Twenty-two species of native bees have been identified as main pollinators of Searls' prairie clover. These include species of potter bees (Anthidium spp.), bumblebees (Bombus spp.), plaster bees (Colletes spp.), and long-horned bees (Eucera and Melissodes spp.). In addition, various species of wasps, flies, and butterflies are also important non-bee pollinators.

=== Herbivory ===
Compared to other legumes, Searls’ prairie clover is a suitable herbivore food source as it lacks toxic compounds. Domestic sheep have shown a preference for the species. Consumption of Searls’ prairie clover has been shown to be an excellent nutrient source, consisting of 17-20% crude protein, and is hypothesized to prevent bloating. As a result, overgrazing has led to a reduction in the range and distribution of Searls’ prairie clover.

=== Fire tolerance ===
Given its habitat, it is likely Searls’ prairie clover has evolved mechanisms to survive fire stress. Plants with destroyed or damaged stems often regenerate stems that are capable of flowering later in the growing season. Furthermore, the species has been found to occur following controlled burnings indicating tolerance to fire.

== Similar species ==
A newly identified species, Dalea janosensis collected from Chihuahua, Mexico is morphologically similar to D. searlsiae. Both species have rose-purple coloured flowers which can cause confusion. However, D. janosensis is significantly smaller than D. searlsiae with smaller leaves and non-deciduous bracts.

When not flowering, D. searlsiae can be confused with D. cylindriceps, D. ornata, and D. flavescens. However, flower colour can easily distinguish these species. Other morphological characteristics are often unreliable if used to distinguish these species due to phenotypic plasticity.

== Rangeland restoration and revegetation ==
Legume species are in high demand for land revegetation and restoration efforts due to their symbiosis with nitrogen-fixing Rhizobia bacteria. The presence of legumes alongside their rhizobial symbionts is desired in restoration, revegetation, and reclamation efforts to improve soil nutrient characteristics. However, the availability of these crops for these projects are limited due to the lack of cultivation. In 2011, Bhattarai and Bushman proposed the use of Searls' prairie clover in rangeland reclamation in the southwestern USA.

Searls’ prairie clover is recommended for restoration and revegetation in regions attaining 152-356mm in annual precipitation. The rationale for using D. searlsiae in restoration projects is attributed to its rehabilitation of soil nutrient conditions and attraction of pollinators.

=== Cultivation and establishment of seeds ===
Three phenotypic/genetic germplasms identified by Bhattarai et al. (2011) are used in land revegetation and restoration efforts. The ‘Fanny’ germplasm originates from seeds found at Patterson Pass in east-central Nevada and is recommended for USDA plant hardiness zone 5b. The ‘Carmel’ germplasm originates from the Colorado Plateau of south-central Utah and is recommended for USDA plant hardiness zone 7a. The Bonneville germplasm was sourced from NW Utah near the Nevada border in USDA plant hardiness zone 6b. However, the Bonneville germplasm was found to be a genetically distinct population and is recommended for use in northwestern Utah. Local germplasms are recommended to prevent outbreeding depression.

The three germplasms were made available by the USDA’s Agricultural Research Service for revegetation and restoration efforts. In 2015, researchers collected seeds from the regions identified by Bhattarai et al. (2011), created germplasms for future cultivation, and verified the genotype of each germplasm through genetic testing.

Planting seeds for these efforts requires pre-treatments. Allowing seeds to overwinter after planting in fall is an effective method. However, many projects use a 5-minute treatment with 98% sulfuric acid to increase germination success.

The species can grow well without irrigation. However, in drier years, irrigation of 100-200mm can be beneficial to increase yield.

== Antimicrobial and insecticidal properties ==
Chromatographic fractionation studies on D. searlsiae root extracts have identified at least six root compounds that infer antimicrobial activity. Among these, two known flavanones and four newly discovered flavanones displayed antimicrobial activity against Streptococcus, Bacillus, and Staphylococcus bacteria.

The root also contains two rotenoids and one flavanone that displayed strong insecticidal activity. It remains to be determined how these compounds enhance the fitness of the plant.
