= Bosque el Nixticuil =

Coordinates: 20°45′57″N 103°24′38″W

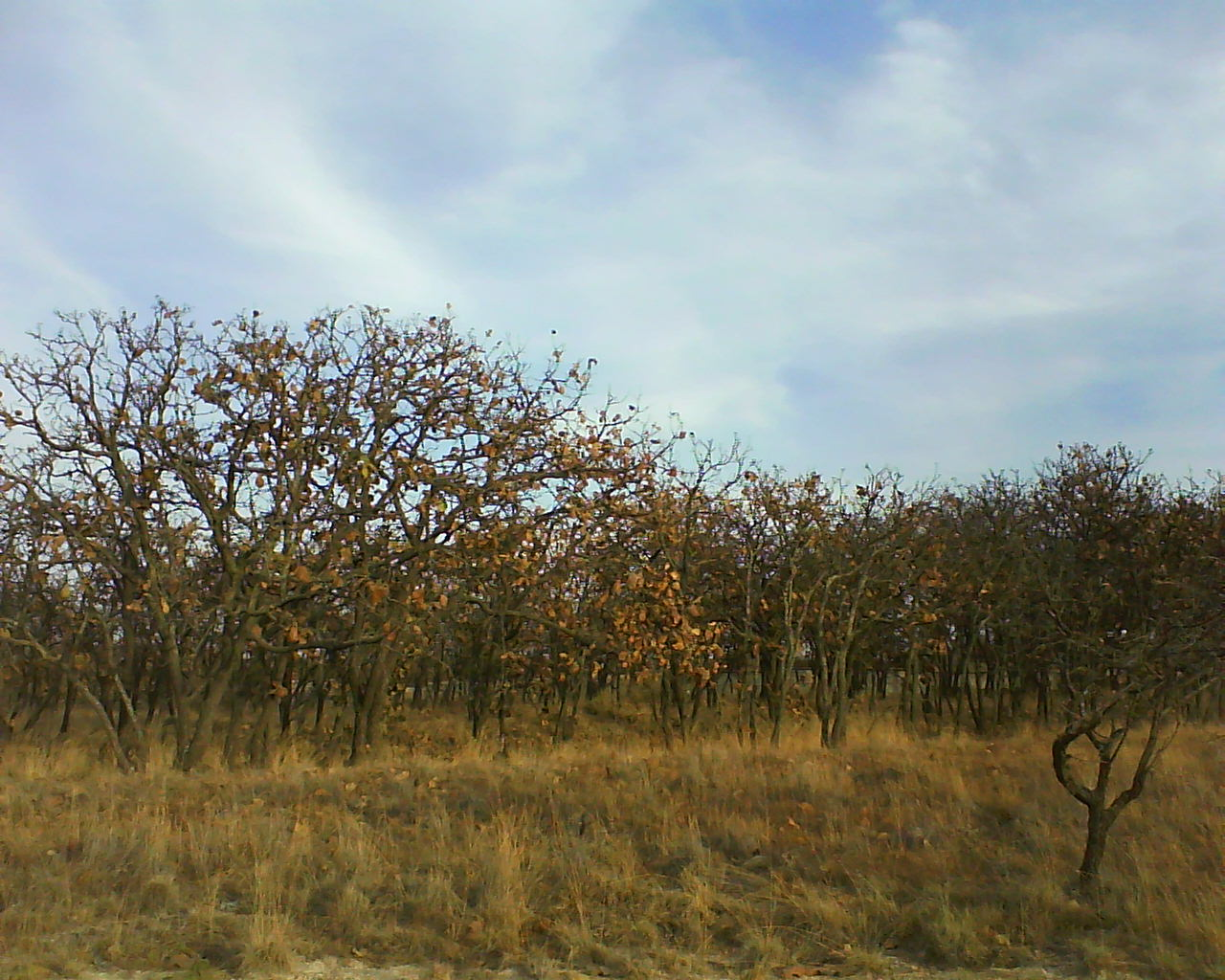
Nixticuil Forest, oak adult drought season

The Bosque el Nixticuil (Nixticuil Forest) is an old-growth forest located northwest of the Metropolitan Zone of Guadalajara in the Mexican town of Zapopan. An urban forest, it is encroached by the metropolitan area's constant growth. It is mostly composed of oak, holm oak and pine.

It is a remnant of a larger, now vanished, forest of more than 27,000 hectares. Its name comes from a local natural promontory called El Nixticuil.

== Features ==
=== Extent ===
The forest stretches over 1,860 hectares, of which 1,591 have been established as a protected area (NPA) under the category of municipal watershed protection area (Area Municipal de Protección Hidrológica). The areas covered by the forest protection decree cover Nixticuil, the Cerro del Diente and the community of San Esteban, which form part of the Río Blanco watershed.

=== Fauna and flora ===
The forest's wildlife include coyote, fox, skunk, rabbit, opossum, various species of rodents and birds, reptiles, amphibians and insects.

Various bird counts have been conducted in the forest, with one study by the University of Guadalajara reporting 107 distinct avian species (two rare, seven threatened and a one under special protection).

In addition to oaks, pines and holm oaks, there is also a great biodiversity of herbs and shrubs such as kidneywood, copal, mallow, mugwort, foxtail, and other trees such as willow, the amate fig, and the cat's claw (tepame) and needle bush (huisache) acacias. It is one of three known habitats of the Styrax jaliscana, a white-flowering shrub in the Styrax family.

== Threats ==
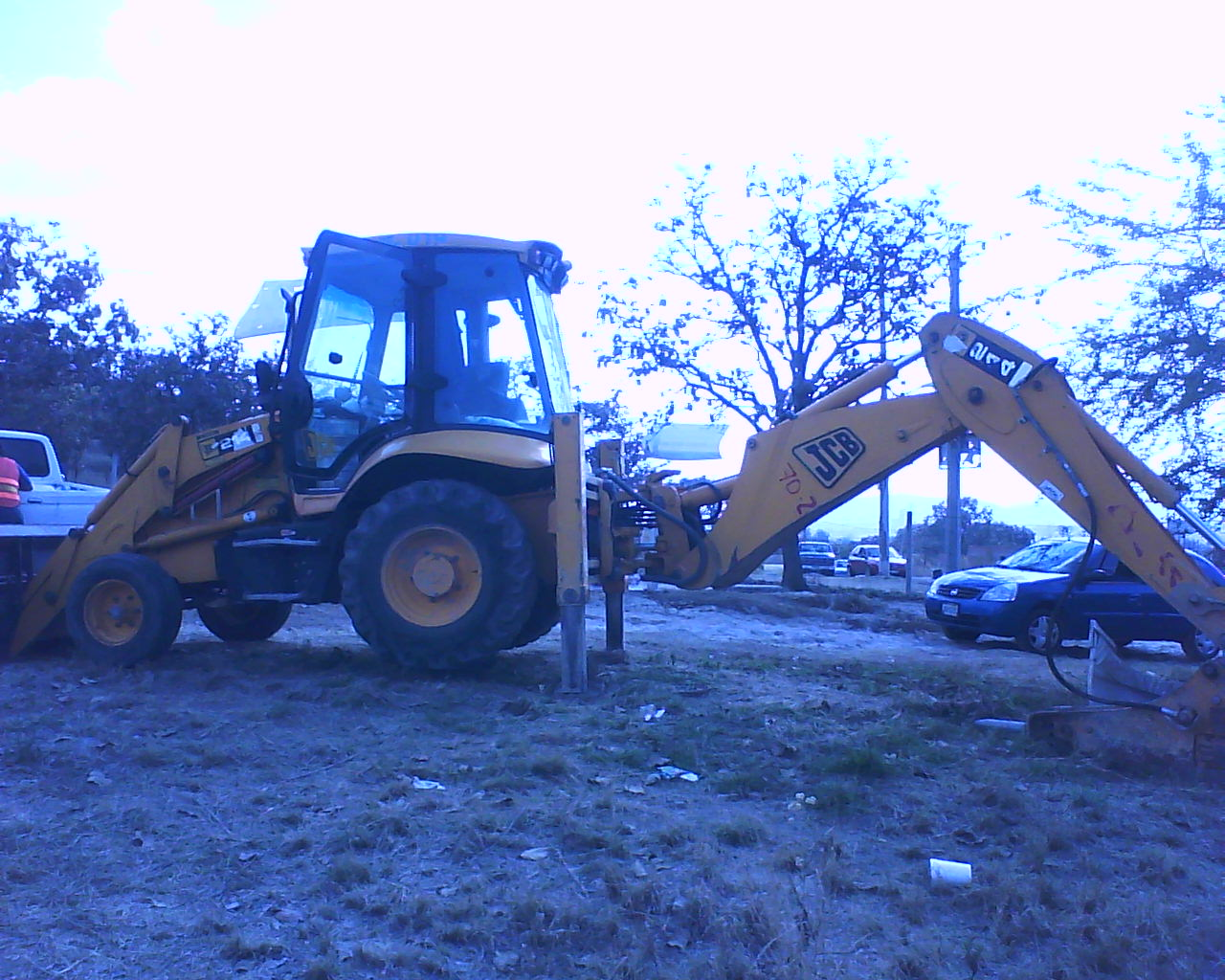
Water district agency's machinery at one entrance to Nixticuil Forest

This forest is currently threatened for several reasons. Environmental organizations such as the Comité Salvabosque de El Nixticuil and the Comité Salvabosque Tigre II have decided to undertake actions to protect it.

=== Protected status ===
In 2005, neighbors and activists petitioned the city of Zapopan to grant the official status of "Protected Area" to 30 hectares of forest. This came after 2004's rainy season, when the ground gave way in the Nextipac community, affecting its inhabitants. At that point, the Zapopan city government intended to relocate those residents to a forested area adjacent to Tigre II, with construction scheduled for 2005. Those already living in Tigre II who wanted to avoid the destruction of the forest, and a significant number of Nextipac residents who refused their forced removal, united to oppose this project.

Following this, the work was suspended and negotiations began. These negotiations continued until the city government decided without warning to retake and expand the territory designated for construction. Thereafter, protests renewed, and on May 18, 2005, the protesters managed to stop the work again, by which time more than 300 oak trees had been cut down.

Together with the Zapopan municipal government's plan to construct public housing on 5 hectares of forest, various other public and private developments have been proposed within Nixticuil Forest. The development sponsored by the Villa de los Niños Association consists of the construction of a building complex, while the Autonomous University of Guadalajara (UAG) presented a project to construct a "University Science and Technology Research Park".

By the end of 2006 the Zapopan government proposed the designation of Nixticuil Forest as a natural protected area. Nevertheless, the Jalisco State Legislature did not act until February 19, 2008 to approve the protected status of 1,591 hectares, which presupposed the freezing of the various municipal projects within Nixticuil Forest.

In June 2007, Comité Salvabosque Tigre II, a community organization, presented a complaint before the Federal Prosecutor for Environmental Protection (PROFEPA) to terminate development, alleging irregularities in the granting of permits. On March 18, this same group also filed a complaint with the Jalisco State Human Rights Commission (CEDHJ).

The Comité Salvabosque decries, in addition to private development plans, pressure by real estate interests continues, as well as anomalies in the act creating the protected area which they allege favor private interests including the Leaño family, the UAG's landowners.

=== Wildfires ===
Fires are one of the greatest threats faced by this forest. According to environmental groups that protect the forest, some of these fires have been intentional, motivated by economic interests.

These fires have had a serious impact on the flora and fauna, as these fires have increased the pace of urban growth in municipality of Zapopan.

=== Logging ===
Given its illegality, over the long term, logging is the main cause of the disappearance of flora and fauna, and has increased in severity due to encroaching urbanization.
