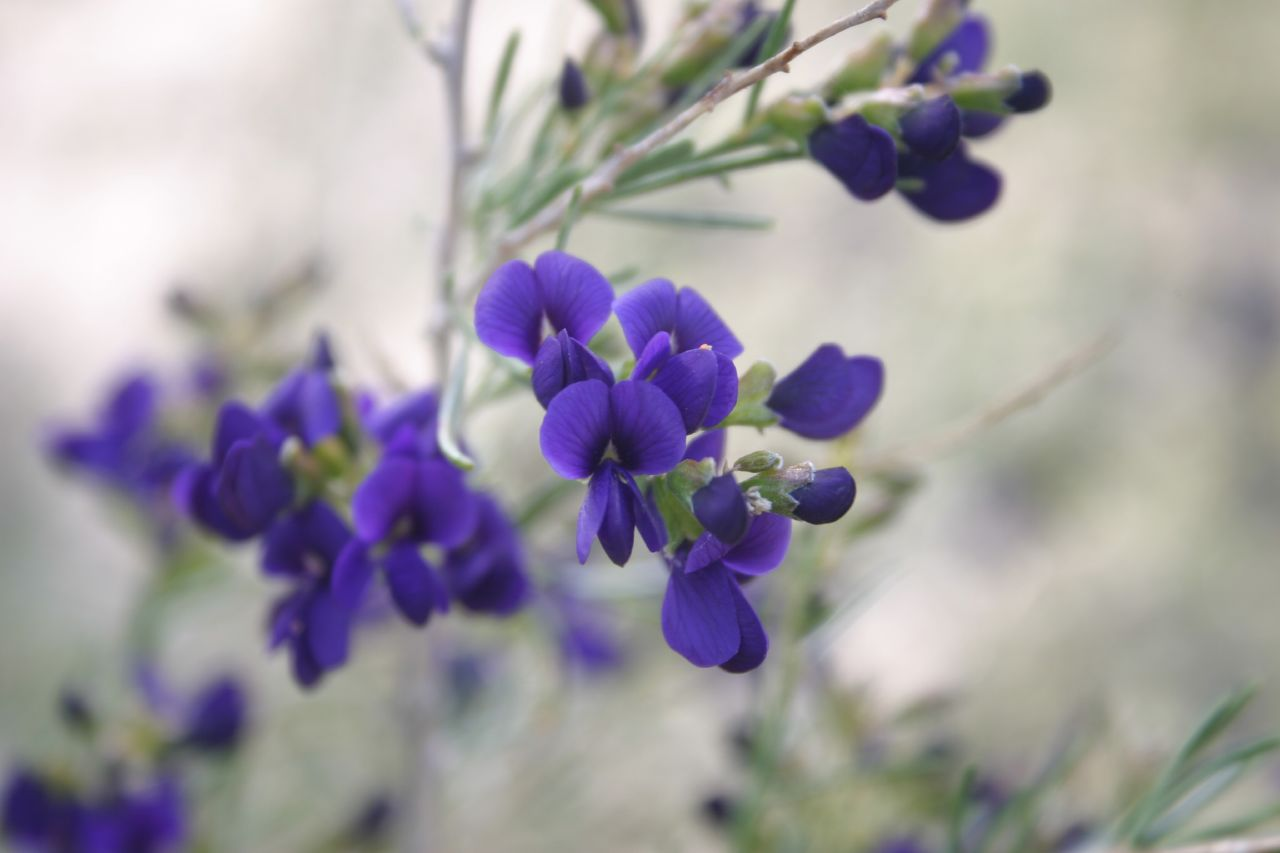

Scientific classification
- Kingdom: Plantae
- Clade: Tracheophytes
- Clade: Angiosperms
- Clade: Eudicots
- Clade: Rosids
- Order: Fabales
- Family: Fabaceae
- Subfamily: Faboideae
- Clade: Dalbergioids
- Tribe: Amorpheae
- Genus: Psorodendron
- Species: P. schottii

Binomial name
- Psorodendron schottii (Torr.) Rydb.

Synonyms
- Dalea schottii Torr. (1859) (basionym); Dalea schottii var. puberula Munz; Parosela schottii (Torr.) A.Heller; Psorothamnus schottii (Torr.) Barneby; Parosela puberula (Parish) Standl.; Parosela schottii var. puberula Parish; Psorodendron puberulum (Parish) Rydb.

= Psorodendron schottii =

Species of legume

Psorodendron schottii is a species of flowering plant in the legume family known by the common name Schott's dalea. It is native to the Sonoran Deserts of northern Mexico and adjacent sections of Arizona and the Colorado Desert in California.

== Description ==
Psorodendron schottii is a shrub approaching two meters in maximum height. Its highly branching stems are green to woolly gray-green and glandular. The gland-pitted linear leaves are up to 3 centimeters long and not divided into leaflets.

The inflorescence is an open raceme of up to 15 flowers. Each flower has a deep purple blue pealike corolla up to a centimeter long in a glandular tubular calyx of sepals with pointed lobes. The fruit is a legume pod coated in glands and containing one seed.
