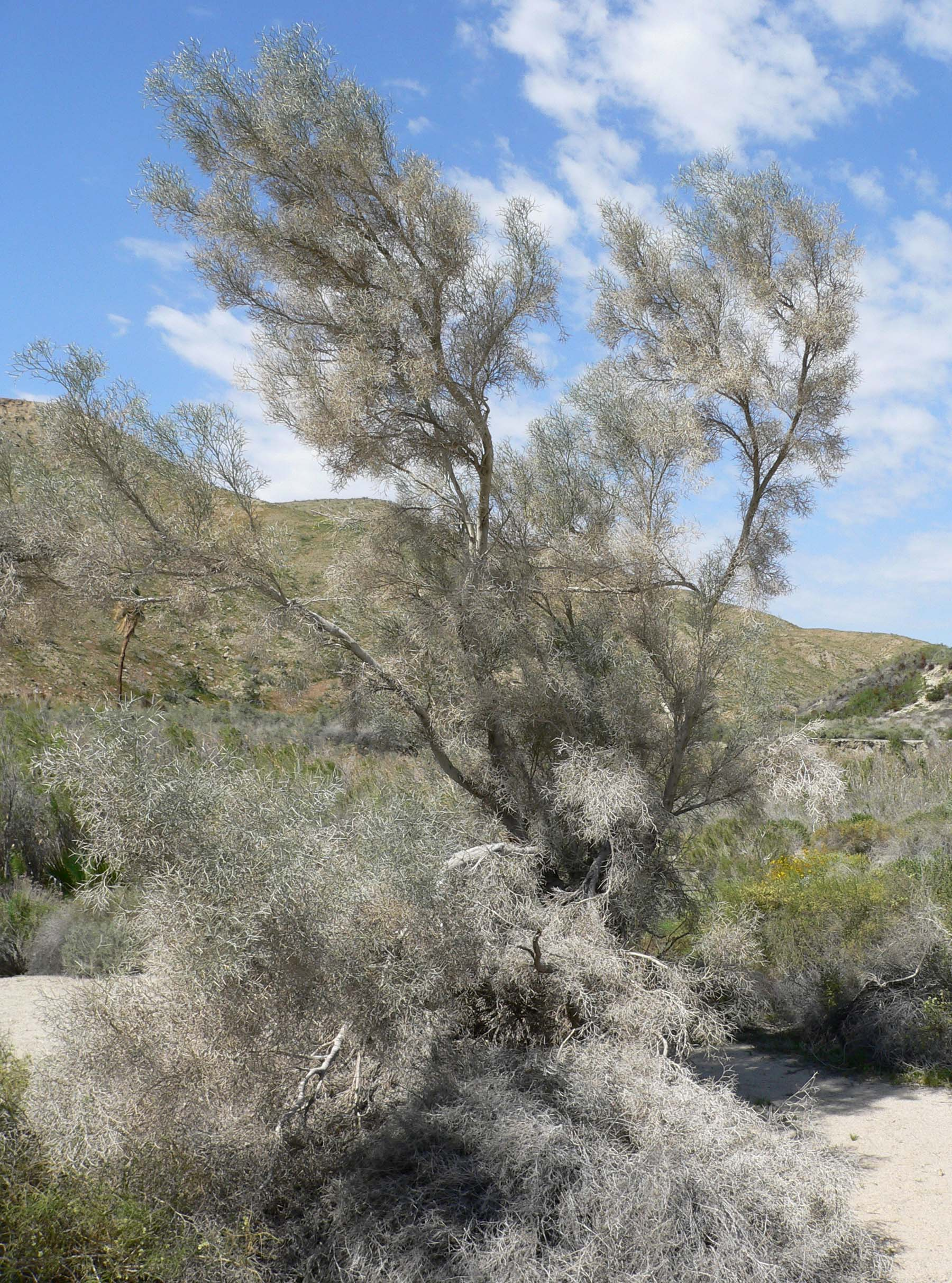
- Mature form: 3–5 m

Scientific classification
- Kingdom: Plantae
- Clade: Tracheophytes
- Clade: Angiosperms
- Clade: Eudicots
- Clade: Rosids
- Order: Fabales
- Family: Fabaceae
- Subfamily: Faboideae
- Clade: Dalbergioids
- Tribe: Amorpheae
- Genus: Psorodendron
- Species: P. spinosum

Binomial name
- Psorodendron spinosum (A.Gray) Rydb.
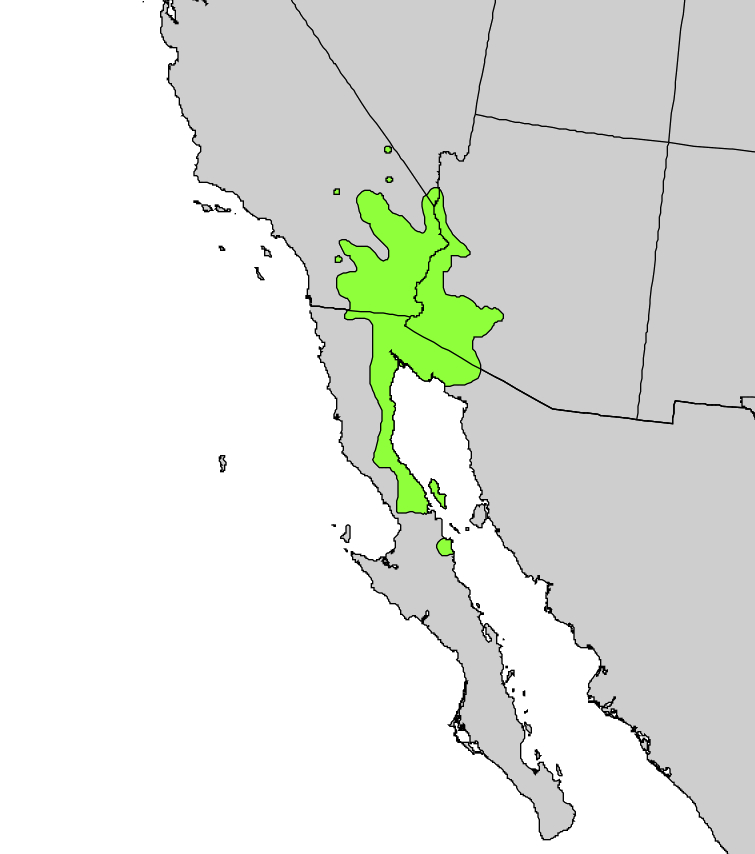
- Natural distribution range

Synonyms
- Asagraea spinosa (A.Gray) Baill.; Dalea spinosa A.Gray (1854) (basionym); Parosela spinosa (A.Gray) A.Heller; Psorothamnus spinosus (A.Gray) Barneby

= Psorodendron spinosum =

Species of legume

Psorodendron spinosum (synonyms Psorothamnus spinosus and Dalea spinosa) is a perennial legume tree of the deserts in North America. Common names include smokethorn, smoketree, smoke tree, smokethorn dalea, and corona de Cristo.

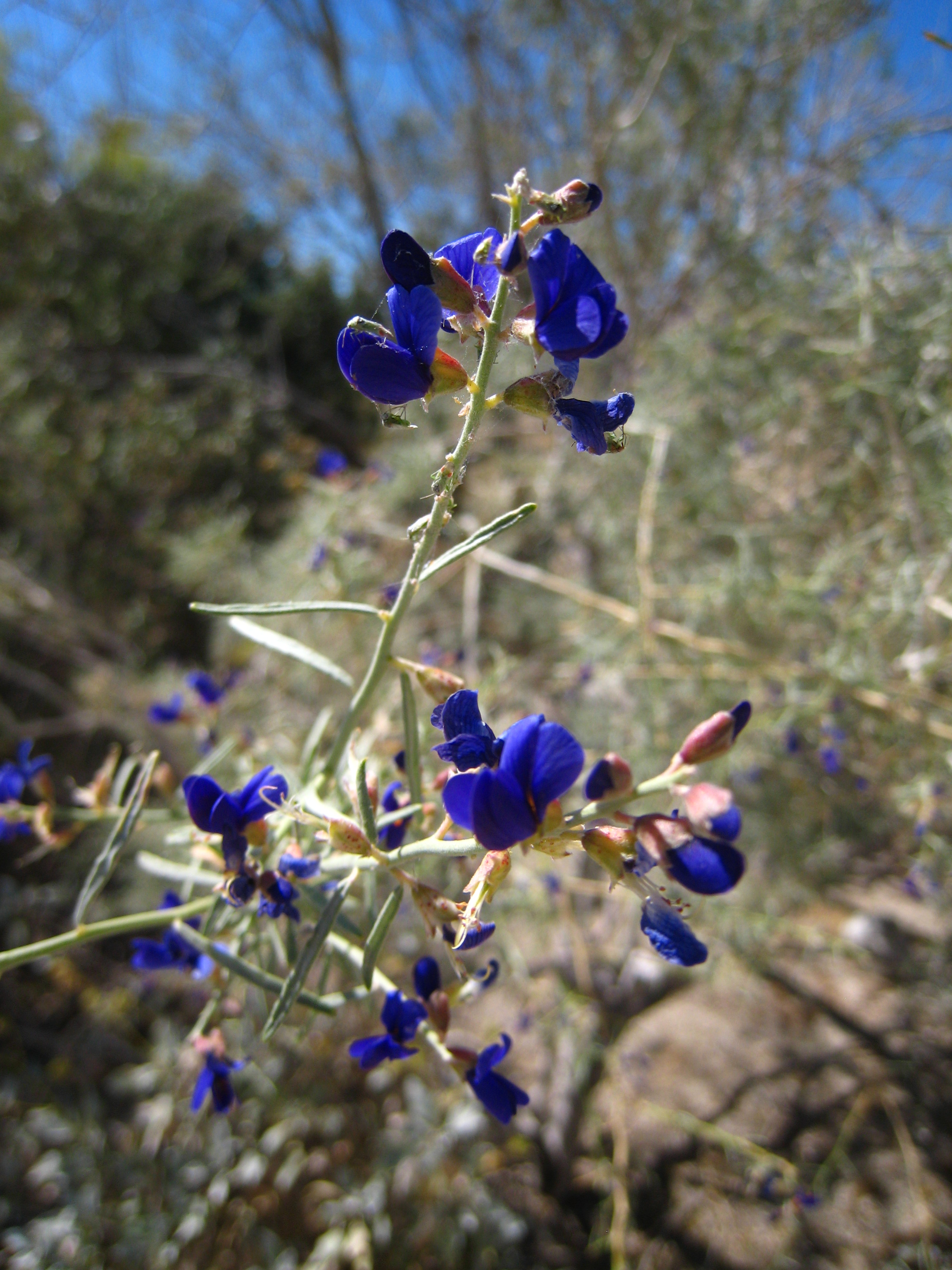
Psorodendron spinosum flowers in Anza-Borrego Desert State Park.

== Distribution ==
P. spinosum is native to the desert washes in the Colorado Desert in Southern California, the Sonoran Desert in western Arizona, and most of eastern Baja California state including several northern Gulf of California (Sea of Cortez) islands, The tree is common in Joshua Tree National Park, where it is called the smoketree.

The range of P. spinosum is centered north–south along the Lower Colorado River Valley ranging northwest into the eastern Mojave Desert, west into mostly all of the Colorado Desert-(subsection of Sonoran Desert), and east of the Colorado River in southwestern Arizona's Sonoran Desert.

To the west in Baja California it borders the western Gulf of California; it occurs on the islands there including Isla Ángel de la Guarda, but not Tiburon Island. To the east in Sonora, the species ranges into the northwest of the great Gran Desierto de Altar, on the northern shore of the Gulf of California.

In Arizona, the RangeMap also shows that the ranges center on the river courses of southwest Arizona, specifically, the Bill Williams River in the north, then the Gila River in the south. The range also extends into extreme southern Nevada, mostly adjacent the Colorado River.
