= Pictarena =

Conservation status
- Imperiled (NatureServe)

Scientific classification
- Kingdom: Plantae
- Clade: Tracheophytes
- Clade: Angiosperms
- Clade: Eudicots
- Clade: Rosids
- Order: Fabales
- Family: Fabaceae
- Subfamily: Faboideae
- Genus: Pictarena; Becklund
- Species: P. rotundata

Binomial name
- Pictarena rotundata (Wooton) Becklund

Synonyms
- Errazurizia rotundata (Wooton) Barneby; Parryella rotundata Wooton (1898) (species basionym)

Genus of flowering plants

Pictarena is a genus of flowering plants in the pea family, Fabaceae. It includes a single species, Pictarena rotundata a subshrub native to northern Arizona commonly known as roundleaf dunebloom.

It is native to the Little Colorado River basin in Coconino and Navajo counties. The Coconino County population is near Tuba City and Wupatki National Monument, and the Navajo County population is near Winslow. It grows in shrubland on a variety of substrates, including dunes, sandy soils on sandstone, alluvial ciders between sandstone breaks, and gravelly soils on calcareous outcrops. Associated species include Artemisia spp., Atriplex canescens, Chrysothamnus spp., Ephedra torreyana, Ephedra viridis, Fallugia paradoxa, Gutierrezia spp., Hilaria jamesii, and Sporobolus flexuosus.

The species was first described as Paryella rotundata by Elmer Ottis Wooton in 1898. In 1962 Rupert Charles Barneby placed it in the genus Errazurizia. A phylogenetic and morphological analysis by L. Ellie Becklund and Tina J. Ayers published 2022 found that the species was morphologically and genetically distinct from Errazurizia, and was sister to the monotypic genus Parryella. Becklund and Ayers placed the species in its own genus as Pictarena rotundata. The genus is distinguished by subsessile, suborbicular leaflets, mammiform leaflet glands, spicate inflorescences, and flowers with either all petals absent or rarely with a banner petal.
