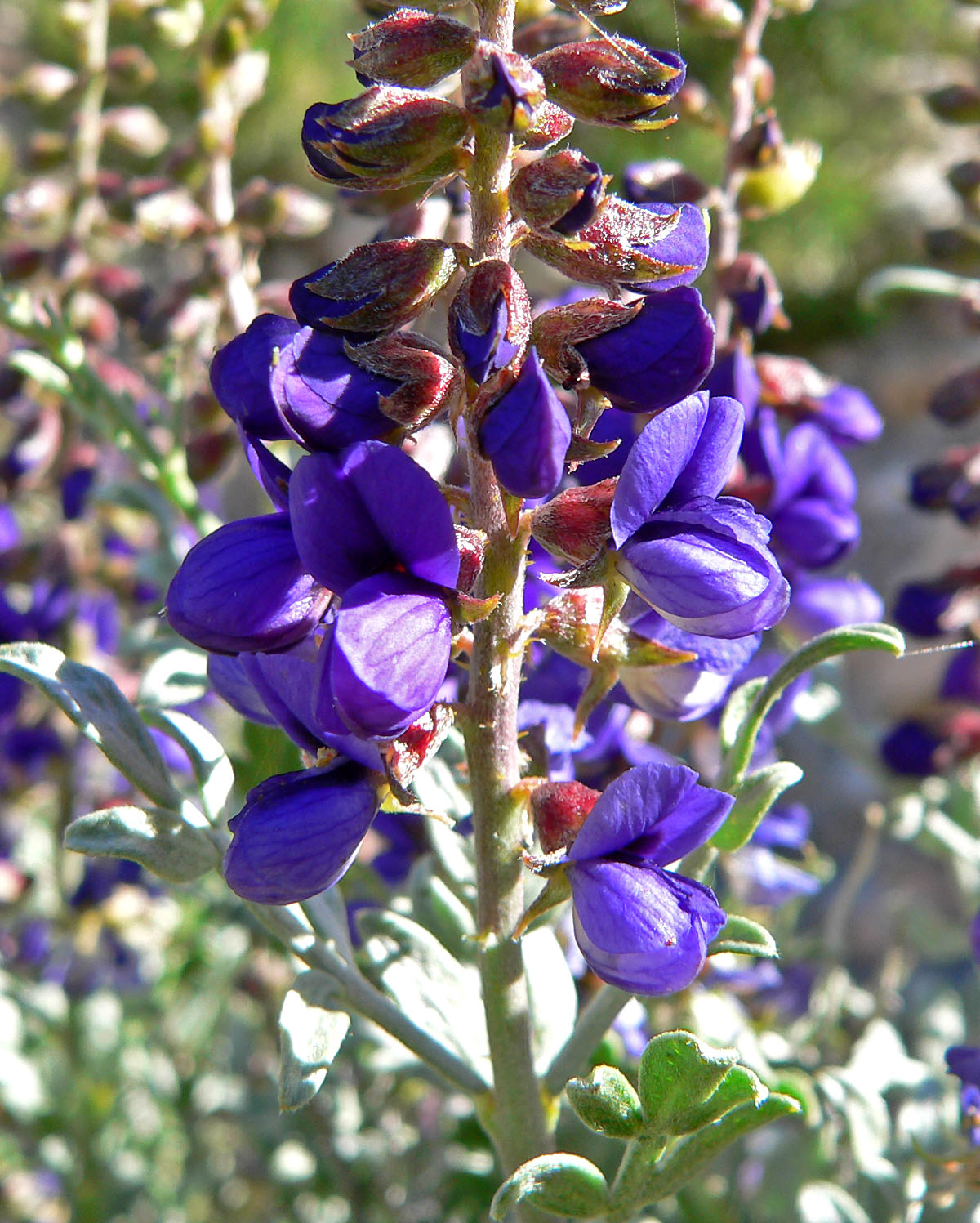
- Psorodendron fremontii

Scientific classification
- Kingdom: Plantae
- Clade: Tracheophytes
- Clade: Angiosperms
- Clade: Eudicots
- Clade: Rosids
- Order: Fabales
- Family: Fabaceae
- Subfamily: Faboideae
- Clade: Meso-Papilionoideae
- Clade: Dalbergioids
- Tribe: Amorpheae
- Genus: Psorodendron; Rydb.

= Psorodendron =

Genus of flowering plants

Psorodendron is a genus of flowering plants in the family Fabaceae. It includes five species native to the southwestern United States and northwestern Mexico.

- Psorodendron arborescens (Torr. ex A.Gray) Rydb. – Mojave indigo bush
- Psorodendron fremontii (Torr. ex A.Gray) Rydb. – Fremont's indigo bush
- Psorodendron kingii (S.Watson) Rydb. – Lahontan indigo bush, King's dalea
- Psorodendron schottii (Torr.) Rydb. – Schott's dalea
- Psorodendron spinosum (A.Gray) Rydb. – smoketree, smokethorn
