= Eysenhardtia orthocarpa =

Conservation status
- Least Concern (IUCN 3.1)

- Secure (NatureServe)

Scientific classification
- Kingdom: Plantae
- Clade: Tracheophytes
- Clade: Angiosperms
- Clade: Eudicots
- Clade: Rosids
- Order: Fabales
- Family: Fabaceae
- Subfamily: Faboideae
- Genus: Eysenhardtia
- Species: E. orthocarpa

Binomial name
- Eysenhardtia orthocarpa (A.Gray) S.Watson

Species of legume

Eysenhardtia orthocarpa is a species of small flowering tree, (a kidneywood) in the family Fabaceae. Its range is at the northern region of the Sierra Madre Occidental cordillera of eastern Sonora; it is also in central Sonora, with the species ranging into southeast Arizona and the extreme southwest, bootheel region of New Mexico, the entire sky island region at the northern cordillera called Madrean Sky Islands.

== Range ==
The range in central Sonora is the eastern Sonoran Desert, with the desert extending into southeast Arizona. The species avoids the hotter, and lower elevation desert region west-northwestwards in Arizona; in Sonora it also avoids the hot Gran Desierto de Altar that lies to the northwest, at the eastern shore of the Gulf of California.

=== Ranges of 3 Mexican species ===
The range of E. polystachya, (Ortega) Sarg. in Vol. 3, Minor Western Hardwoods, Little, shows the Mexican Plateau range of "kidneywood" from Chihuahua-Coahuila-Nuevo León-Tamalulipas south to Hidalgo in the Sierra Madre Oriental, in the southeast, and to Pacific Coast western Oaxaca at the south.

On the map, 'E. orthocarpa is a disjunct population of the Sonoran-Arizona-New Mexico group. Of note E. Texana (Scheele), lies intersecting the range E. polystachya to the northeast in southeast Chihuahua-Coahuila-Nuevo León; there, it is the continuation of the species E. polystachya northeastwards into Texas, but as the species Eysenhardtia texana.

The resolution of the three groups are thus orthocarpa in the northwest, texana in the northeast, and polystachya in the rest of central and southern Mexico.
