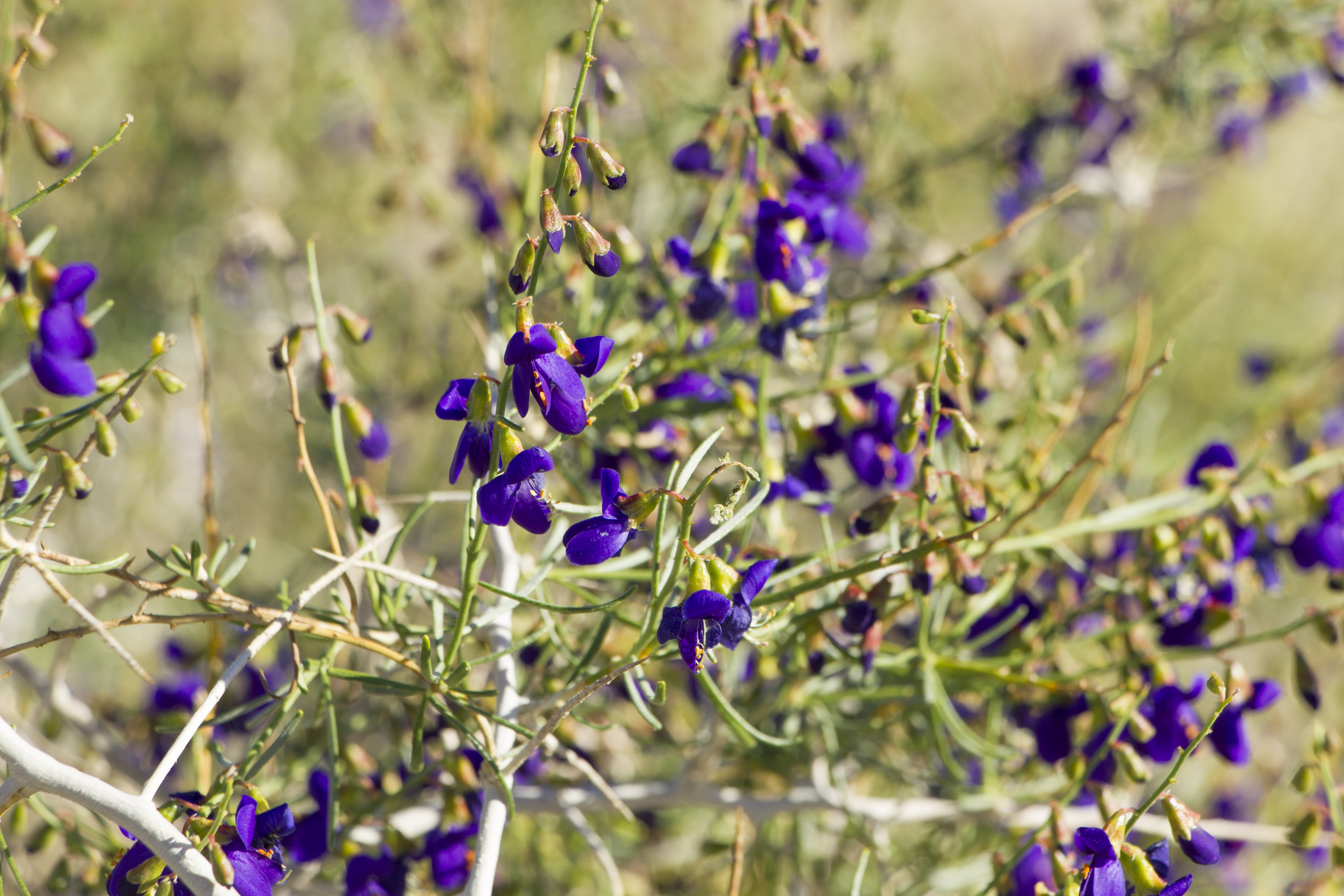

Scientific classification
- Kingdom: Plantae
- Clade: Tracheophytes
- Clade: Angiosperms
- Clade: Eudicots
- Clade: Rosids
- Order: Fabales
- Family: Fabaceae
- Subfamily: Faboideae
- Clade: Dalbergioids
- Tribe: Amorpheae
- Genus: Psorodendron
- Species: P. arborescens

Binomial name
- Psorodendron arborescens (Torr. ex A.Gray) Rydb.

Synonyms
- Dalea amoena S.Watson; Dalea arborescens Torr. ex A.Gray (1854) (basionym); Dalea californica S.Watson; Dalea saundersii Parish; Parosela amoena (S.Watson) Vail; Parosela arborescens (Torr. ex A.Gray) A.Heller; Parosela californica (S.Watson) Vail; Parosela neglecta Parish; Parosela saundersii (Parish) Abrams; Parosela wheeleri Vail; Psorodendron amoenum (S.Watson) Rydb.; Psorodendron californicum (S.Watson) Rydb.; Psorodendron pubescens (Parish) Rydb.; Psorodendron saundersii (Parish) Rydb.; Psorodendron wheeleri (Vail) Rydb.; Psorothamnus arborescens (Torr. ex A.Gray) Barneby

= Psorodendron arborescens =

Mojave indigo bush

Species of legume

Psorodendron arborescens is a species of flowering plant in the legume family known by the common name Mojave indigo bush.

== Distribution and habitat ==
Psorodendron arborescens is native to southwestern North America, where it can be found in many types of desert and dry mountainous habitats. It grows at 100–1,900 metres (330–6,230 ft) in elevation.

It is found in the Californian Mojave Desert and Colorado Desert, south into the Sonoran Desert in the Mexican state of Sonora, east past the Sierra Nevada into the Nevada Great Basin Desert, and west into the San Bernardino Mountains of Southern California. Also found in northwest Arizona in the Joshua Tree National Forest.

== Description ==
Psorodendron arborescens is a shrub growing no more than 1 metre (3.3 ft) tall, its highly branching stems sometimes with thorns. The leaves are each made up of a few pairs of green linear to oval leaflets up to a centimeter in length.

The inflorescence is a long raceme of many flowers with reddish green calyces of sepals and bright purple pealike corollas up to a centimeter long.

The fruit is a glandular legume pod up to a centimeter long containing one seed. The seed pod is the only way to tell the difference between P. arborescens and the very similar species, P. fremontii.
