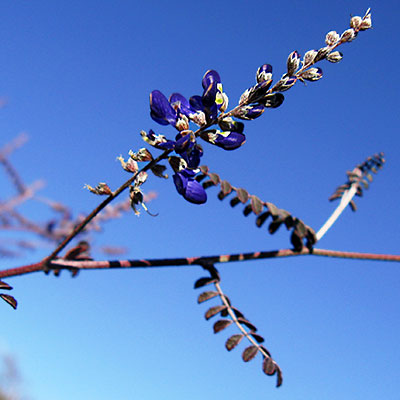

Scientific classification
- Kingdom: Plantae
- Clade: Tracheophytes
- Clade: Angiosperms
- Clade: Eudicots
- Clade: Rosids
- Order: Fabales
- Family: Fabaceae
- Subfamily: Faboideae
- Genus: Marina
- Species: M. parryi

Binomial name
- Marina parryi (Torr. & A.Gray) Barneby

Synonyms
- Dalea parryi

= Marina parryi =

Species of legume

Marina parryi is a species of flowering plant in the legume family known by the common name Parry's false prairie-clover. It is native to the deserts of the southwestern United States and northern Mexico. This is a perennial herb producing stiff, branching stems 20 to 80 centimeters long. It is coated with glands and rough hairs. The leaves are made up of several pairs of small oval leaflets no more than 6 millimeters long. The inflorescence is a raceme of deep blue and white bicolored flowers each under a centimeter long. The fruit is a legume pod containing a single seed.
