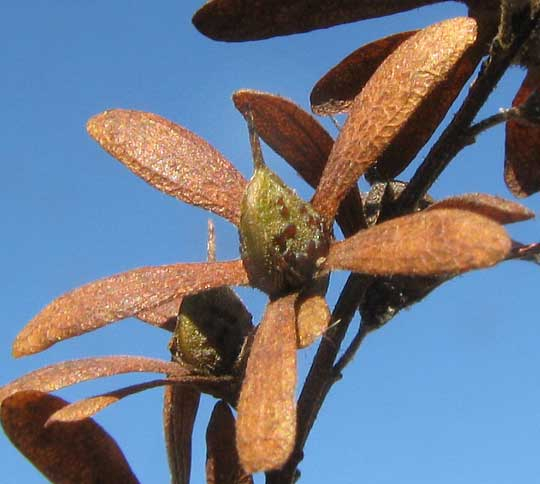
- Apoplanesia paniculata, one-seeded legume surrounded by 5 persisting sepals

Scientific classification
- Kingdom: Plantae
- Clade: Tracheophytes
- Clade: Angiosperms
- Clade: Eudicots
- Clade: Rosids
- Order: Fabales
- Family: Fabaceae
- Subfamily: Faboideae
- Genus: Apoplanesia
- Species: A. paniculata

Binomial name
- Apoplanesia paniculata C.Presl, 1831

Synonyms
- Eysenhardtia oliviana Saff. (1916); Microlobium glandulosum Liebm. (1853)

= Apoplanesia paniculata =

Species of plant

Apoplanesia paniculata is a flowering plant belonging to the family Fabaceae.

== Description ==
Apoplanesia paniculata is a shrub or small tree up to 15 m (49 ft) tall. Its leaves arise singly along the stem, or sometimes almost opposite one another. They are once divided (imparipinnate), up to 20 cm (7.9 in) long, and have petioles up to 3 cm (1.2 in) long. Leaflets usually number 15-21, though there may be fewer, and are covered with short hairs on both surfaces; Their lower surfaces are speckled with numerous glandular dots. When fresh leaves are crushed there's a fragrant, spicy odor. A machete chop on a trunk brings forth a reddish sap.

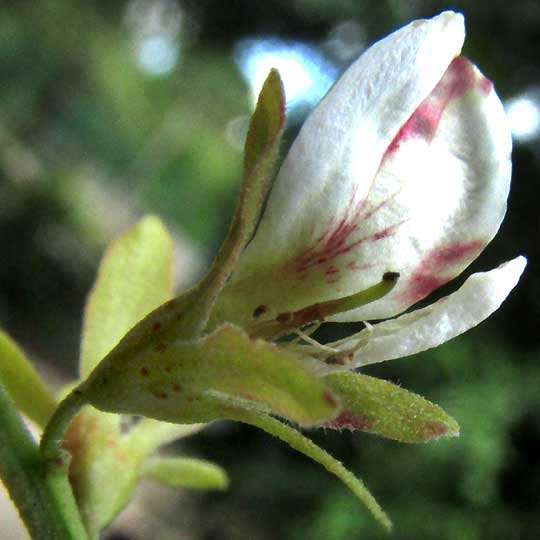
Apoplanesia paniculata flower

Flowers are arranged in panicles up to 20 cm (8 in) long at the ends of branches or above petiole bases. Papilionaceus-type flowers are white, the five petals of similar length, about 3 mm (0.12 in) long, and the pedicels are only about 1 mm (0.04 in) long. Calyxes are 5-lobed, the lobes conspicuously dotted with glands, and persisting after the corolla has fallen. The leathery, legume-type fruits are reddish-brown, egg-shaped but compressed, up to 3.5 mm (0.14 in) long, and bear only one seed; the fruits don't split open. It's to be noted that among species with papilionaceous flowers, the flowers of this species have side and bottom petals which are only weakly differentiated; they're very similar to one another.

== Distribution ==
Apoplanesia paniculata occurs from southern Mexico south into Costa Rica. The GBIF map displaying locations of observations of the species indicate that in Mexico two main populations centers are apparent, one in the northern Yucatan Peninsula and the other in the southwestern region on the Pacific side.

== Habitat ==
In Mexico's Yucatan Peninsula Apoplanesia paniculata inhabits dry deciduous forests and secondary vegetation such as along roads, beside cultivated fields, etc.

== Human uses ==
=== As a source of dye ===
In the pre-Columbian era the Maya civilization of Mesoamerica painted walls of their temples and other buildings with murals for which Apoplanesia paniculata was a principal source for the red color. A red sap is associated with the tree's inner bark. In Mexico's Yucatan Peninsula the dye's red color is used to dye paper.

=== In traditional medicine ===
In México, the leaves of Apoplanesia paniculata have been cooked, resulting in a reddish water. In accordance with the ancient doctrine of signatures, the redness "signals" the suggestion that the resulting decoction may be used to fortify the blood. In México drinking the water daily has been advised.

A study of the effects of an ethanol extract of roots of Apoplanesia paniculata found compounds exhibiting antiplasmodial activity, thus possibly effective against plasmodia causing malaria.

=== For building ===
In Mexico's Yucatan Peninsula the wood is used for building.

== Taxonomy ==
Only two species are regarded as belonging to the genus Apoplanesia, those being A. paniculata and A. crytopetala. The latter occurs only in Venezuela.

== Etymology ==
The genus name Apoplanesia, as explained in Latin by the Czech botanist Karel Bořivoj Presl when he erected the genus in 1831, was derived from the Greek word for "aberration", due to the flower structure being aberrant for the Papilionaceae. "... ob floris structuram a Papilionaceis aberrantem." Surely he has in mind that the species's five petals are not nearly as different from one another as with typical papilionaceus blossoms.

The species name paniculata is a borrowing from the Latin word paniculatus, referring to the species' panicle-type inflorescence.

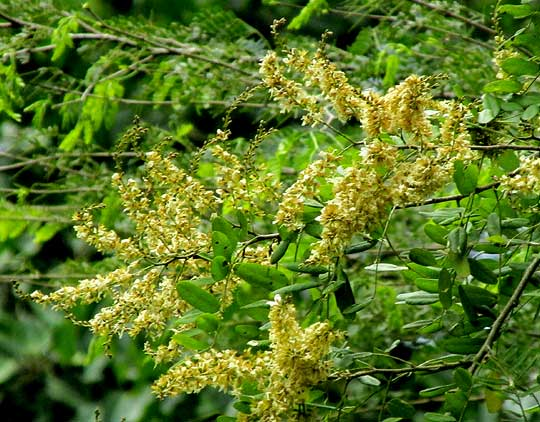
Apoplanesia paniculata flowering inflorescence

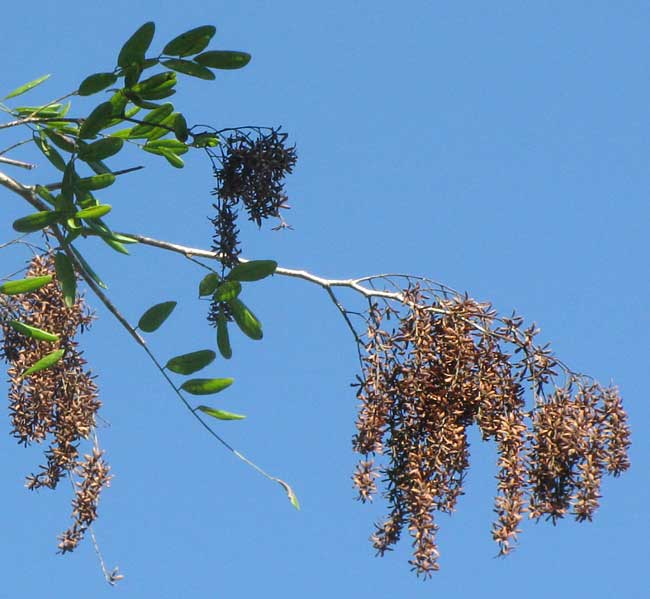
Apoplanesia paniculata fruiting inflorescence

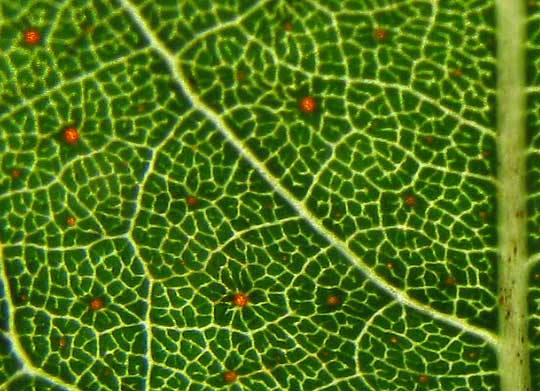
Apoplanesia paniculata reddish epidermal glands on leaf
