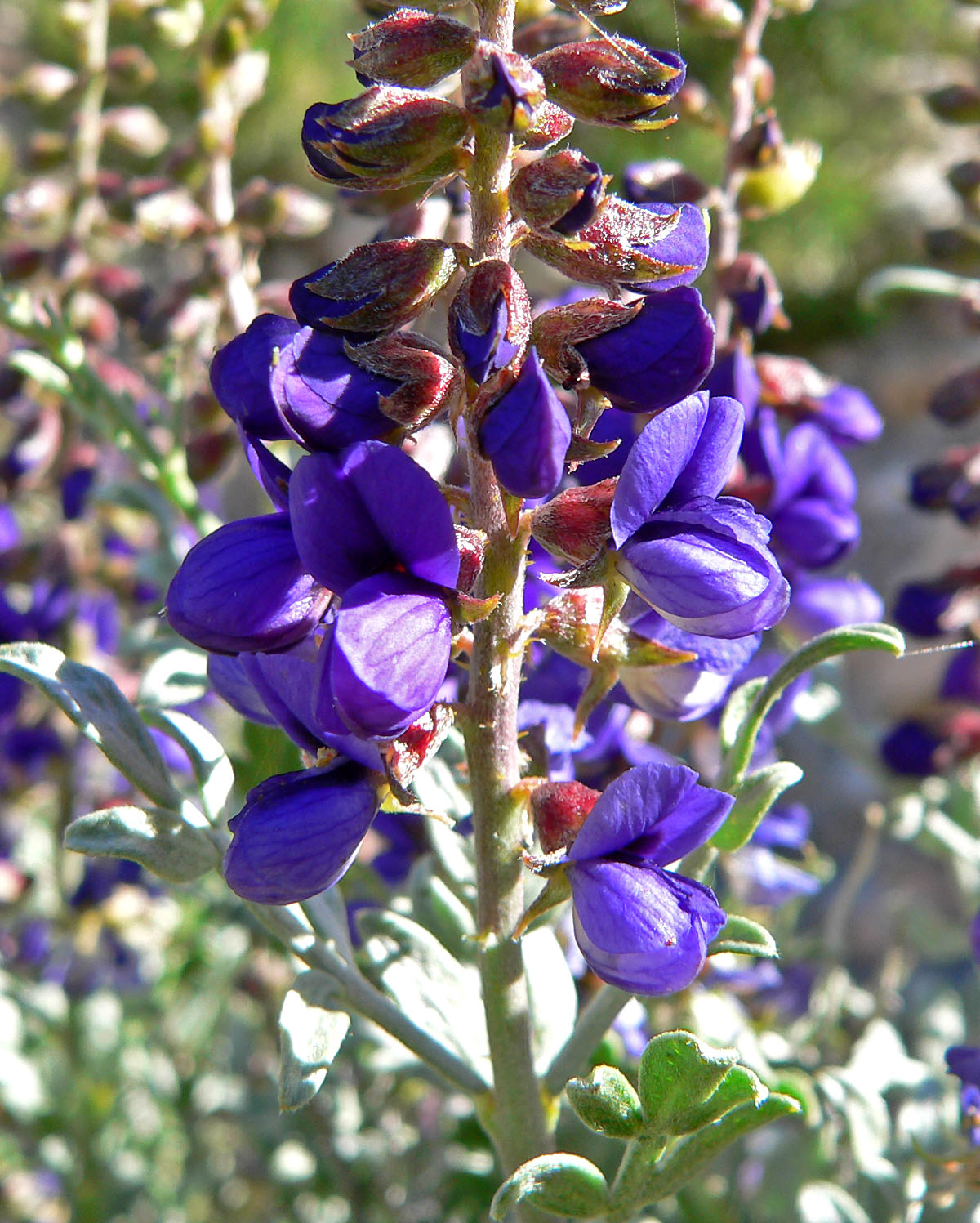

Scientific classification
- Kingdom: Plantae
- Clade: Tracheophytes
- Clade: Angiosperms
- Clade: Eudicots
- Clade: Rosids
- Order: Fabales
- Family: Fabaceae
- Subfamily: Faboideae
- Clade: Dalbergioids
- Tribe: Amorpheae
- Genus: Psorodendron
- Species: P. fremontii

Binomial name
- Psorodendron fremontii (Torr. ex A.Gray) Rydb.

Synonyms
- Dalea fremontii Torr. ex A.Gray (1854) (basionym); Dalea fremontii var. johnsonii (S.Watson) Munz; Dalea johnsonii S.Watson; Parosela fremontii (Torr. ex A.Gray) Vail; Parosela fremontii var. johnsonii (S.Watson) Jeps.; Parosela johnsonii (S.Watson) Vail; Psorothamnus fremontii (Torr. ex A.Gray) Barneby; Psorodendron johnsonii (S.Watson) Rydb.; Psorothamnus fremontii var. attenuatus Barneby; Psorothamnus fremontii var. fremontii

= Psorodendron fremontii =

Species of legume

Psorodendron fremontii, the Fremont's dalea or Fremont's indigo bush (after John C. Frémont) is a perennial legume shrub.

== Distribution ==
Psorodendron fremontii is common to the Southwestern United States and northwest Mexico - in the states of California, Nevada, Utah, and Arizona, Sonora, and Baja California.

The plant is found in the Sonoran Deserts (including the Colorado Desert), the Great Basin Deserts, and the Mojave Desert sky islands, from 250–1,350 metres (820–4,430 ft) in elevation.
