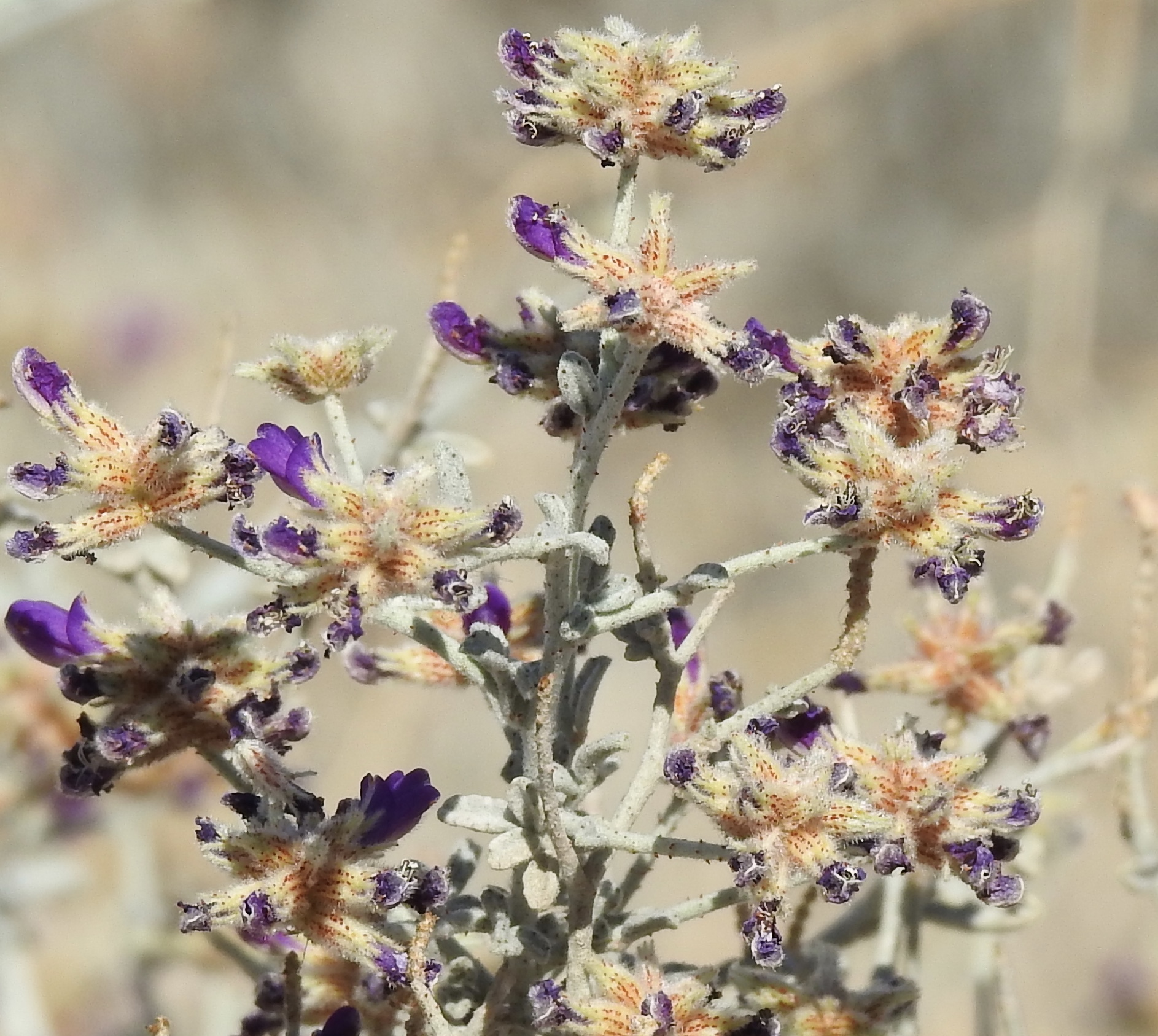

Scientific classification
- Kingdom: Plantae
- Clade: Tracheophytes
- Clade: Angiosperms
- Clade: Eudicots
- Clade: Rosids
- Order: Fabales
- Family: Fabaceae
- Subfamily: Faboideae
- Genus: Psorothamnus
- Species: P. emoryi

Binomial name
- Psorothamnus emoryi (A. Gray) Rydb.

Synonyms
- Dalea emoryi

= Psorothamnus emoryi =

Species of legume

Psorothamnus emoryi, common names dyebush, white dalea, or Emory's indigo bush, is a perennial legume shrub or subshrub common to the desert mesas of the southern part of the U.S. states of Arizona and California, and regions of the Mexican state of Baja California.

== Description ==
The Psorothamnus emoryi shrub grows to 3-4 feet (1 m). The leaves are hairy and grayish white, a color helping reflect sunlight.

It has terminal clusters of purple and white pea-like flower. It flowers from March to June, and persists until the hottest and driest weather prevails near early or midsummer.

== Uses ==
The plant is fragrant and oily and has been used for dyes and stains.
