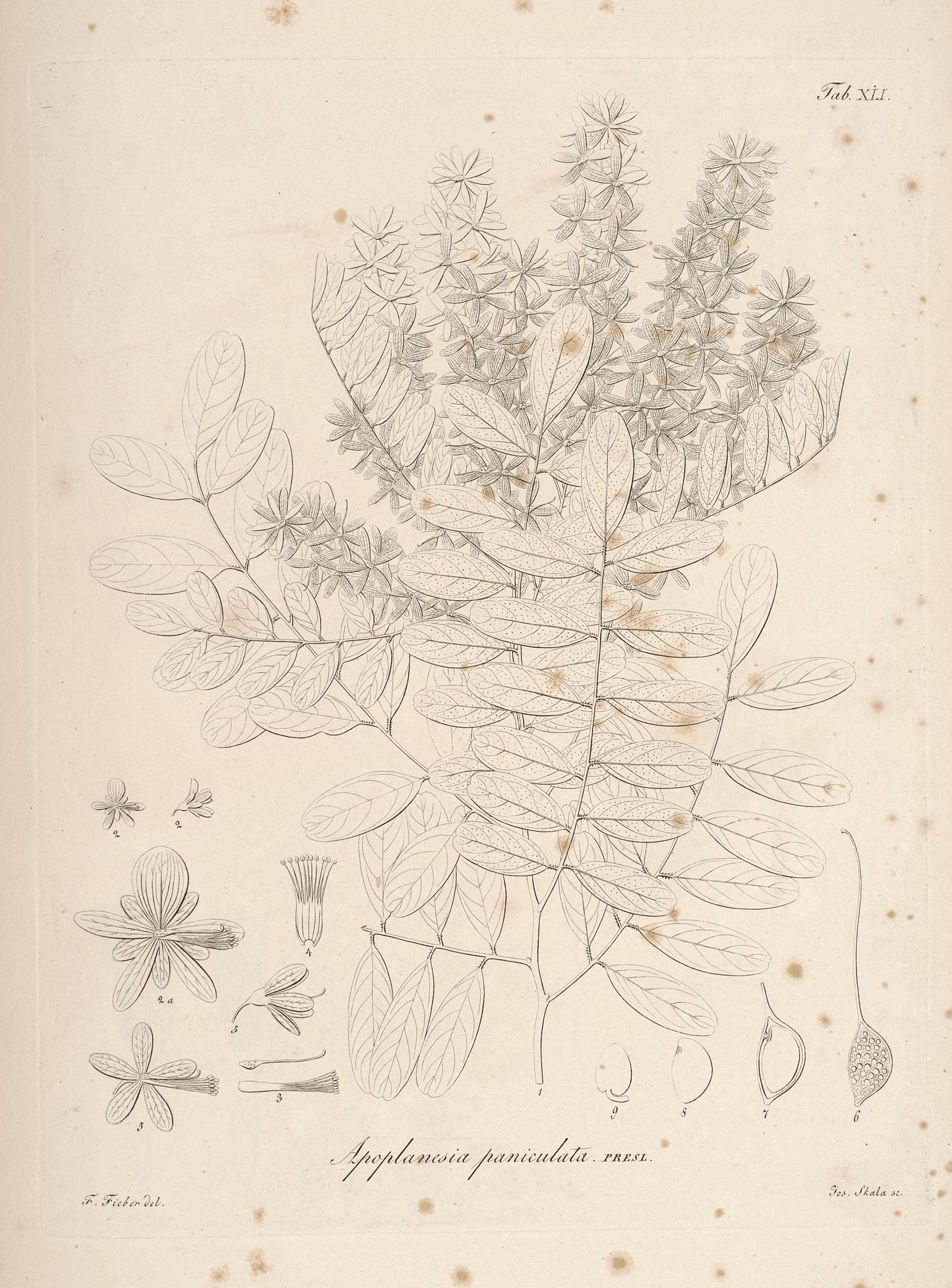
- Apoplanesia paniculata

Scientific classification
- Kingdom: Plantae
- Clade: Tracheophytes
- Clade: Angiosperms
- Clade: Eudicots
- Clade: Rosids
- Order: Fabales
- Family: Fabaceae
- Subfamily: Faboideae
- Tribe: Amorpheae
- Genus: Apoplanesia; C. Presl

Species
- 2; see text

Synonyms
- Microlobium Liebm.

= Apoplanesia =

Genus of plants

Apoplanesia is a genus of flowering plants in the family Fabaceae. It belongs to the subfamily Faboideae.

== Species ==
Apoplanesia comprises the following species:

- Apoplanesia cryptopetala Pittier
- Apoplanesia paniculata C. Presl—Palo de Arco
