= Eysenhardtia =

Scientific classification
- Kingdom: Plantae
- Clade: Tracheophytes
- Clade: Angiosperms
- Clade: Eudicots
- Clade: Rosids
- Order: Fabales
- Family: Fabaceae
- Subfamily: Faboideae
- Tribe: Amorpheae
- Genus: Eysenhardtia; Kunth

Type species
- Eysenhardtia polystachya (Ortega) Sarg.

Species
- 13–14; see text

Synonyms
- Varennea DC.; Viborquia Ortega

Genus of legumes

Eysenhardtia is a genus of flowering plants in the family Fabaceae. It belongs to the subfamily Faboideae. Members of the genus are commonly known as kidneywoods.

== Species ==
Eysenhardtia comprises the following species:

- Eysenhardtia adenostylis Baill.
- Eysenhardtia drummondii Torr. & A. Gray
- Eysenhardtia officinalis Cruz Durán & M. Sousa
- Eysenhardtia orthocarpa (A.Gray) S.Watson—Tahitian kidneywood
- Eysenhardtia parvifolia Brandegee
- Eysenhardtia peninsularis Brandegee
- Eysenhardtia platycarpa Pennell & Saff.
- Eysenhardtia polystachya (Ortega) Sarg.
- Eysenhardtia punctata Pennell
- Eysenhardtia schizocalyx Pennell
- Eysenhardtia spinosa A. Gray—spiny kidneywood
- Eysenhardtia subcoriacea Pennell
- Eysenhardtia texana Scheele—Texas kidneywood

=== Species names with uncertain taxonomic status ===
The status of the following species is unresolved:

- Eysenhardtia spinosa Engelm.
