= Fanny Searls =

American doctor and botanical collector (1851–1939)

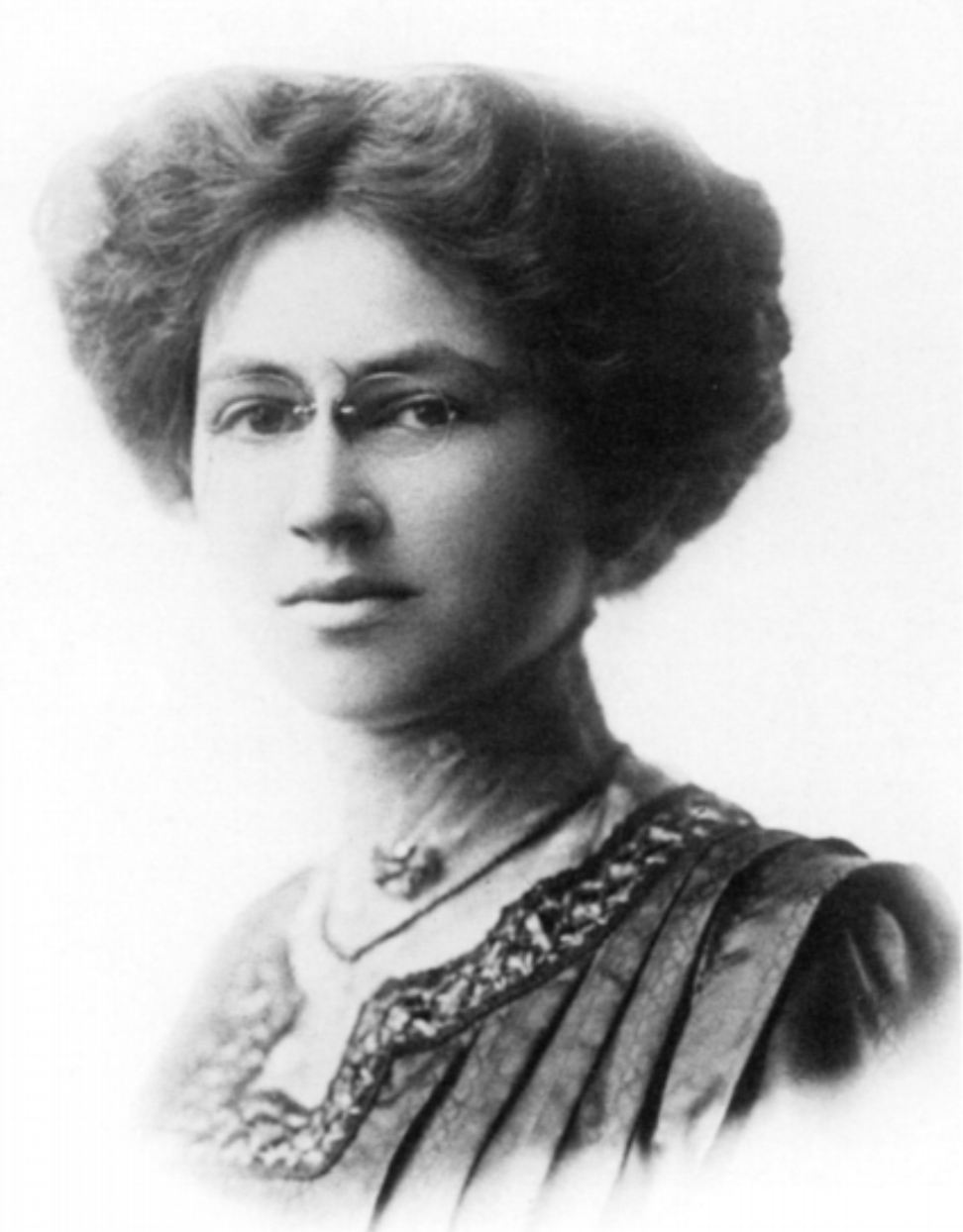
- Searls c. 1870
- Born: September 21, 1851; Waukegan, Illinois, US
- Died: May 24, 1939 (aged 87); Santa Barbara, California, US
- Other names: Fanny Gradle
- Education: Northwest Female College; Northwestern University; University of Michigan
- Occupation: Physician
- Spouse: Henry Gradle (m. 1881; died 1911)
- Children: 2

Fanny Searls (September 21, 1851 – May 24, 1939), also known by her married name Fanny Gradle, was an American physician and botanical collector. Dalea searlsiae, Searls' prairie clover, is named after her. Born in Waukegan, Illinois, she attended Northwestern University and the University of Michigan, gaining her medical degree in 1877. She then worked at Bellevue Hospital as a student nurse as there were few opportunities for women to gain medical internships at the time. In the meantime, she had developed skills as a concert pianist and a collector of botanical and geological specimens. In the last capacity, she donated a collection of 215 specimens gathered in Nevada to Northwestern University, including the first subsequently named Searls' prairie clover. She moved to Santa Barbara, dying there in 1939.

== Life ==
Searls was born on September 21, 1851, in Waukegan, Illinois, the daughter of Stewart Searls, a lawyer who operated from Chicago and Emily Cuthbert, the daughter of John Cuthbert, a physician. Her family descended from Jeremiah Searles, who had migrated from England to New York in the previous century. She received her early schooling in the town, then attended the Northwest Female College in Evanston, Illinois, leaving with a Laureate in Science in 1870.

She then entered Northwestern University, the first woman to register in the first co-educational class at the institution, one of only five women to enroll. She was one of the first women graduates from the medical school at the university. Searls received her medical doctor degree from the University of Michigan in 1877. At the time, it was difficult for women to gain internships due to gender discrimination, so instead she worked as a student nurse at Bellevue Hospital, New York. At the same time, Searls performed as a concert pianist. She had developed a talent for the piano from a young age, and studied with Richard Strauss while in New York.

On August 30, 1881, she married Henry Gradle, an ophthalmologist. He subsequently became successively professor of physiology, hygiene and ophthalmology, and ontology at her alma mater, Northwestern University. They lived in Chicago, while retaining homes in Waukegan and Santa Barbara, and had two children, Harry born in 1883 and Roy in 1892. Following her husband's death in 1911, Searls sold their Chicago home, donated the Waukegan home to the Hattie Barwell Settlement Association and moved to Santa Barbara. She died there on May 24, 1939.

== Collecting career ==
In 1871, Searls accompanied her father to the Pahranagat Valley, Nevada, where she collected various rocks, fossils, quartzite with fragments of crinoids, and 215 botanical specimens. She handed this collection to Oliver Marcy at Northwestern University, who subsequently handed specimens to Asa Gray, who then described and published them. Gray described four species:Chaenactis brachypappus A. Gray (Asteraceae), Penstemon caespitosus var. incanus A. Gray (Scrophulariaceae), Symphoricarpos longiflorus A. Gray (Caprifoliaceae) and Petalostemon searlsiae A. Gray (Fabaceae). The last of these, now known as Dalea searlsiae, was a new discovery and was named the Searls' prairie clover in her honour.
