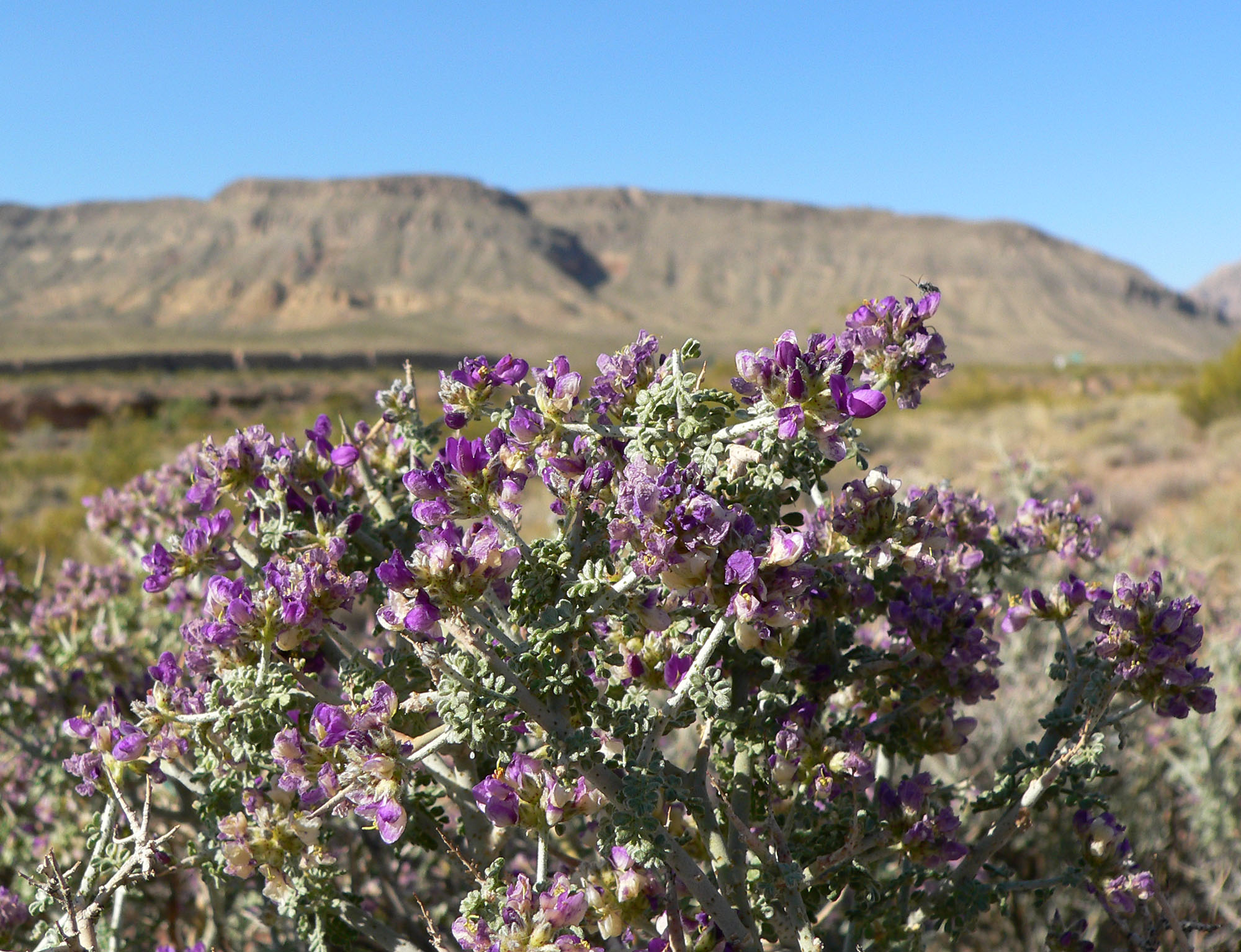

Scientific classification
- Kingdom: Plantae
- Clade: Tracheophytes
- Clade: Angiosperms
- Clade: Eudicots
- Clade: Rosids
- Order: Fabales
- Family: Fabaceae
- Subfamily: Faboideae
- Genus: Psorothamnus
- Species: P. polydenius

Binomial name
- Psorothamnus polydenius (Torr. ex S.Watson) Rydb.

= Psorothamnus polydenius =

Species of legume

Psorothamnus polydenius is a species of flowering plant in the legume family known by the common names Nevada dalea and Nevada indigobush. It is native to the deserts of the southwestern United States from the Mojave Desert in California to Utah.

== Description ==
Psorothamnus polydenius is a shrub sometimes exceeding one meter in height. Its highly branching stems taper to twigs coated in soft, rough, or silky hairs and visible glands. The small leaves are each made up of a few pairs of oval or rounded leaflets each a few millimeters long.

The inflorescence is a dense raceme or spikelike cluster of several flowers. Each flower has a pinkish purple pealike corolla about half a centimeter long in a glandular calyx of sepals with pointed lobes. The fruit is a small legume pod containing one seed.

One variety of this species, Psorothamnus polydenius var. jonesii, is endemic to Utah.
