= Errazurizia =

Scientific classification
- Kingdom: Plantae
- Clade: Tracheophytes
- Clade: Angiosperms
- Clade: Eudicots
- Clade: Rosids
- Order: Fabales
- Family: Fabaceae
- Subfamily: Faboideae
- Tribe: Amorpheae
- Genus: Errazurizia; Phil. (1872)

Species
- 4; see text

Synonyms
- Psorobatus Rydb. (1919)

Genus of legumes

Errazurizia (dunebroom) is a genus of flowering plants in the family Fabaceae. It belongs to subfamily Faboideae. It includes four species of subshrubs native to northwestern Mexico and Chile.

== Species ==
Errazurizia comprises the following species:

- Errazurizia benthamii (Brandegee) I.M. Johnst. – western Baja California
- Errazurizia megacarpa (S. Watson) I.M. Johnst. – northwestern Mexico
- Errazurizia multifoliolata (Clos) I.M. Johnst. – northern and central Chile

=== Formerly placed here ===
- Pictarena rotundata (Wooton) Becklund (as Errazurizia rotundata (Wooton) Barneby) – Arizona
