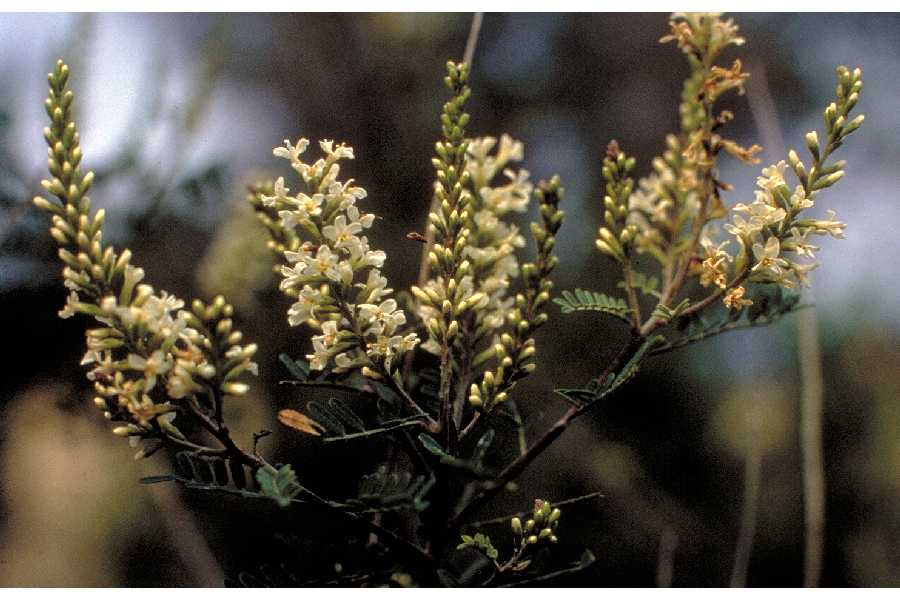

Conservation status
- Least Concern (IUCN 3.1)

- Secure (NatureServe)

Scientific classification
- Kingdom: Plantae
- Clade: Tracheophytes
- Clade: Angiosperms
- Clade: Eudicots
- Clade: Rosids
- Order: Fabales
- Family: Fabaceae
- Subfamily: Faboideae
- Genus: Eysenhardtia
- Species: E. texana

Binomial name
- Eysenhardtia texana Scheele
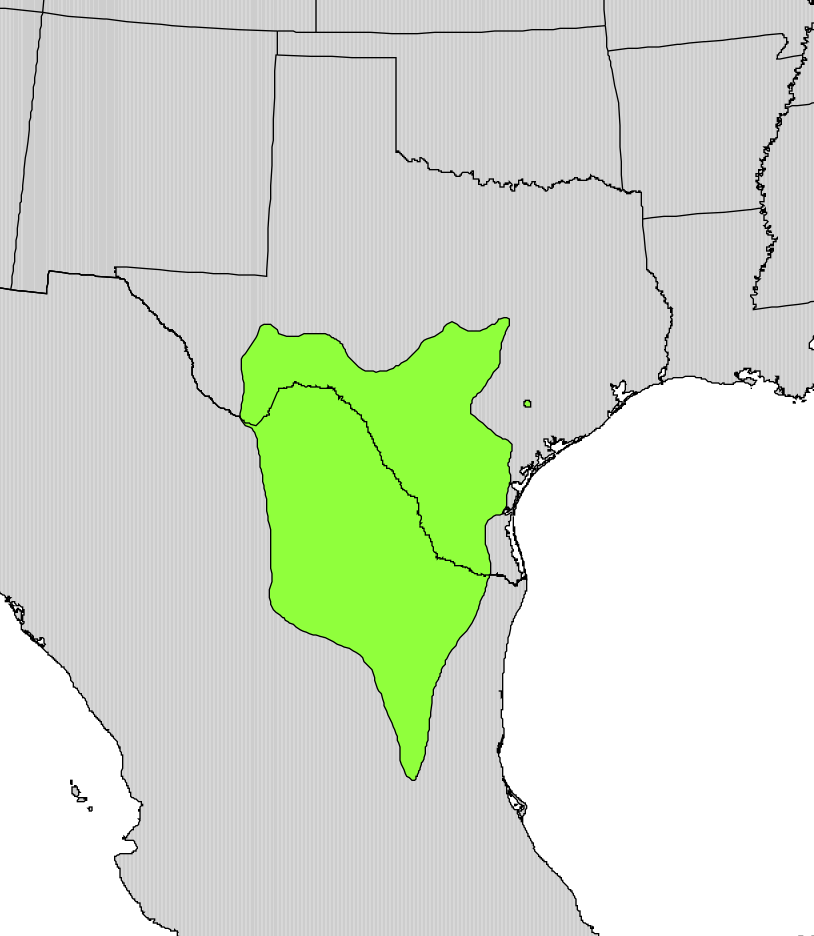
- Natural range

= Eysenhardtia texana =

Species of legume

Eysenhardtia texana, commonly known as Texas kidneywood, bee-brush, or vara dulce, is a species of small flowering tree in the legume family, Fabaceae. It is found from south-central Texas south to northern San Luis Potosí in the Rio Grande Valley region of south Texas–Northeastern Mexico, and the species ranges into the eastern Chihuahuan Desert areas of Coahuila.

== Distribution ==
The contiguous range of Texas kidneywood covers the three neighboring Mexican states of Coahuila, Nuevo Leon, and Tamaulipas in northeast Mexico, the Rio Grande valley, from Big Bend southeastwards, but not the coastal Gulf of Mexico areas, only 25–50 miles inland. Part of the range extends southwards into extreme northern San Luis Potosí, and some isolated locales towards east-central and southern Texas.
