= Psorothamnus scoparius =

Scientific classification
- Kingdom: Plantae
- Clade: Tracheophytes
- Clade: Angiosperms
- Clade: Eudicots
- Clade: Rosids
- Order: Fabales
- Family: Fabaceae
- Subfamily: Faboideae
- Genus: Psorothamnus
- Species: P. scoparius

Binomial name
- Psorothamnus scoparius (A.Gray) Rydb.

Species of legume

Psorothamnus scoparius is a thornless bush in the bean family (Fabaceae), native to North America. It is known as broom smokebush and broom dalea.

== Distribution and habitat ==
Psorothamnus scoparius is native to the southwestern United States, particularly sandy areas within New Mexico's Rio Grande valley. It is rarely seen in adjacent states and the northernmost region of Chihuahua, Mexico. The shrub typically grows in high deserts at elevations of 3,000 to 6,000 ft (910 to 1,830 m), centered in the sand scrub communities of the Chihuahuan Desert ecoregion but extending into the Little Colorado River valley of northeastern Arizona, at lower elevations of the Colorado Plateau.

== Description ==
Broom dalea is a small shrub with grey colored branches and a broom-like appearance. Purple flowers and only a few simple leaves appear after rains.
