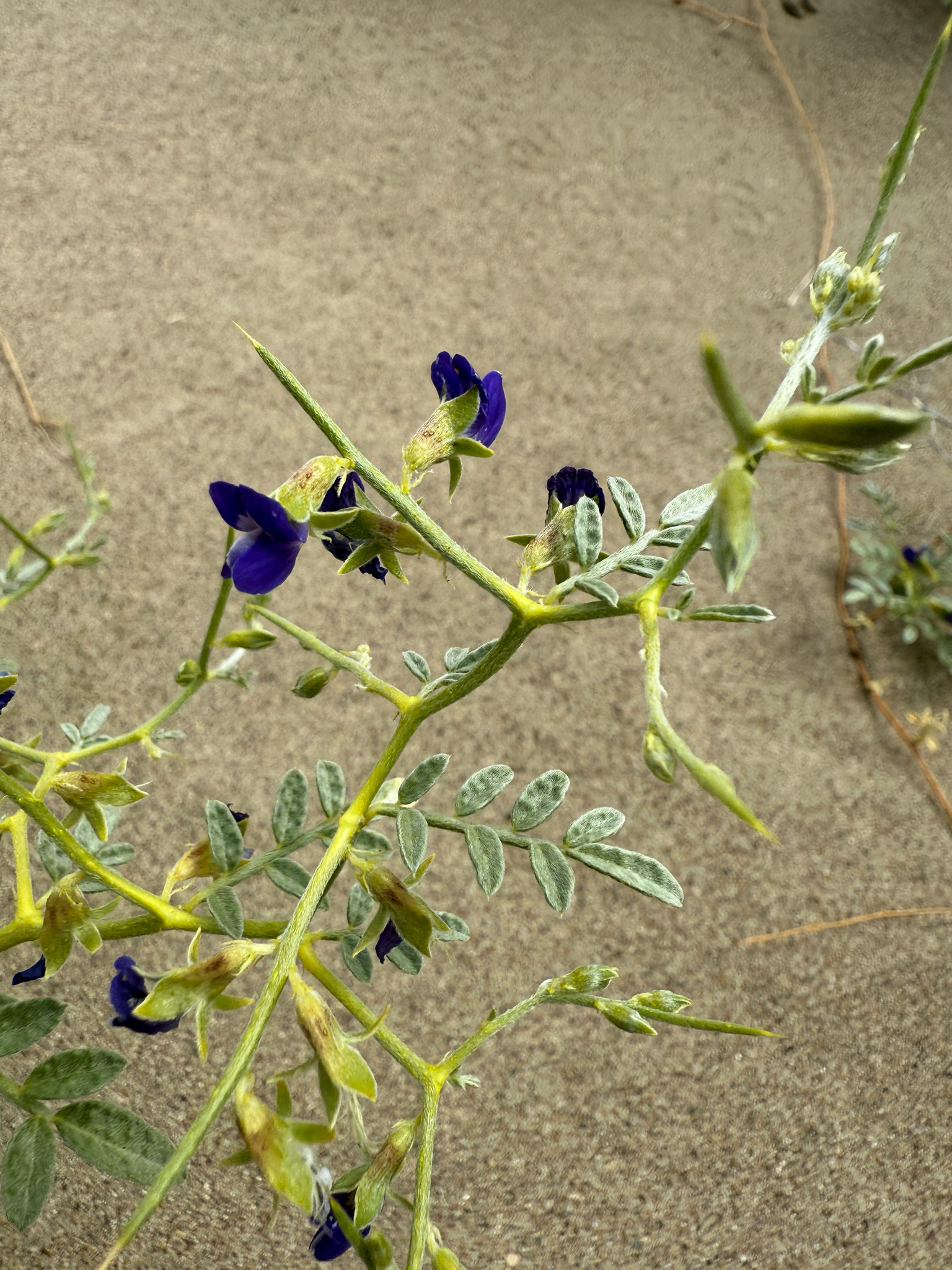

Scientific classification
- Kingdom: Plantae
- Clade: Tracheophytes
- Clade: Angiosperms
- Clade: Eudicots
- Clade: Rosids
- Order: Fabales
- Family: Fabaceae
- Subfamily: Faboideae
- Genus: Psorodendron
- Species: P. kingii

Binomial name
- Psorodendron kingii (S.Watson) Rydb.

Synonyms
- Dalea kingii S.Watson (1871) (basionym); Parosela kingii (S.Watson) A.Heller; Psorothamnus kingii (S.Watson) Barneby

= Psorodendron kingii =

Species of flowering plant

Psorodendron kingii, commonly known as Lahontan indigobush or King's dalea, is a species of flowering plant in the family Fabaceae. It is a perennial native to Nevada.
