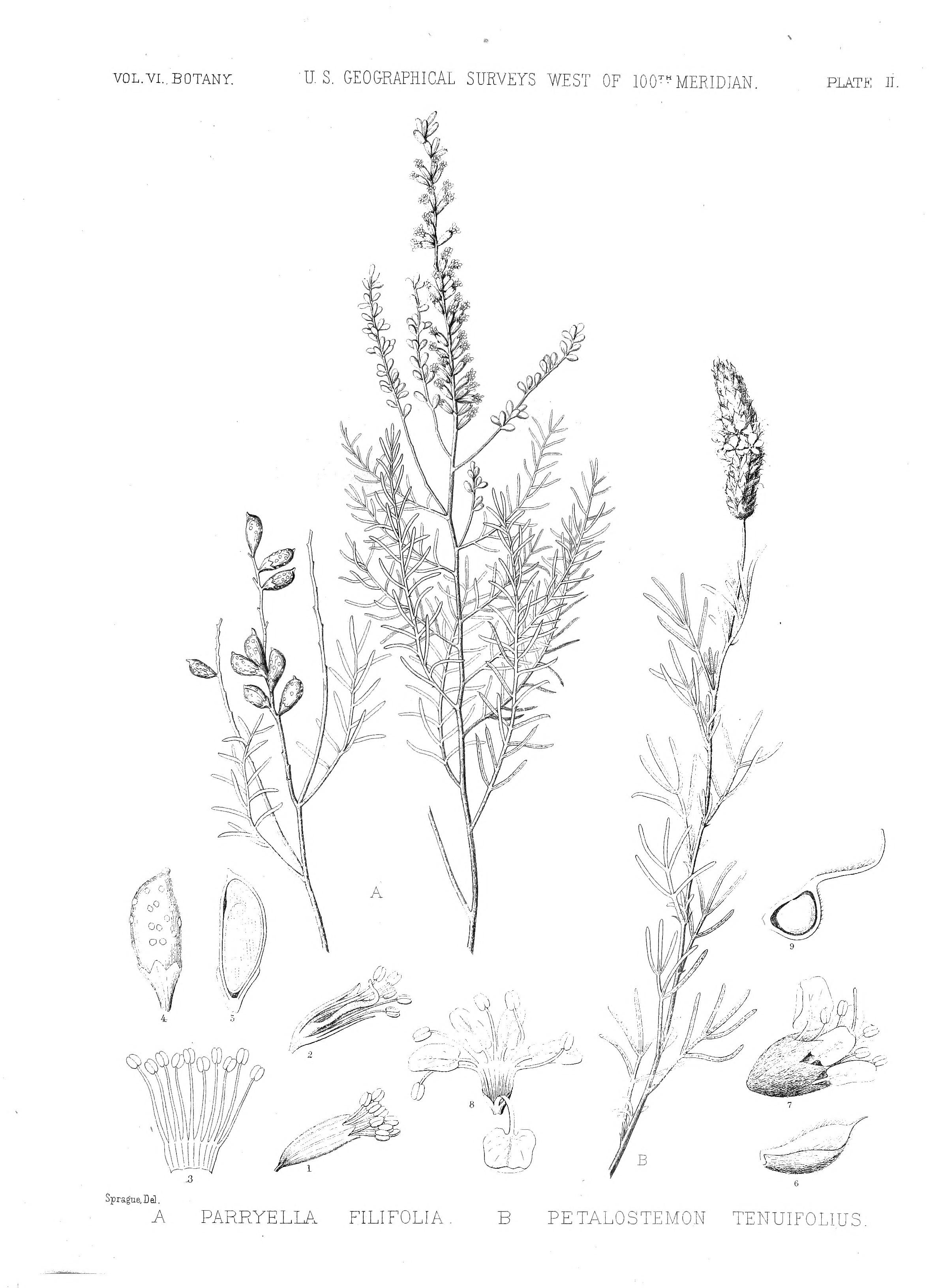
- Paryella filifolia (Illustration A)

Conservation status
- Vulnerable (NatureServe)

Scientific classification
- Kingdom: Plantae
- Clade: Tracheophytes
- Clade: Angiosperms
- Clade: Eudicots
- Clade: Rosids
- Order: Fabales
- Family: Fabaceae
- Subfamily: Faboideae
- Tribe: Amorpheae
- Genus: Parryella; Torr. & A. Gray
- Species: P. filifolia

Binomial name
- Parryella filifolia Torr. & A.Gray

= Parryella =

Plant genus in the pea family

Parryella filifolia, the common dunebroom, is a species of flowering plants in the family Fabaceae. It belongs to the subfamily Faboideae. It is the only member of the genus Parryella. It is native to Arizona, Colorado and New Mexico.

Its ashes were sometimes used by members of the Hopi tribe in the maize nixtamalization process and helped to retain the blue color of cornmeal used to make piki bread. The beans were also used as a remedy for toothaches.

The genus name of Parryella is in honour of Charles Christopher Parry (1823–1890), who was a British-American botanist and mountaineer.

The genus and the species were circumscribed by John Torrey and Asa Gray in Proc. Amer. Acad. Arts vol.7 on page 397 in 1868.
