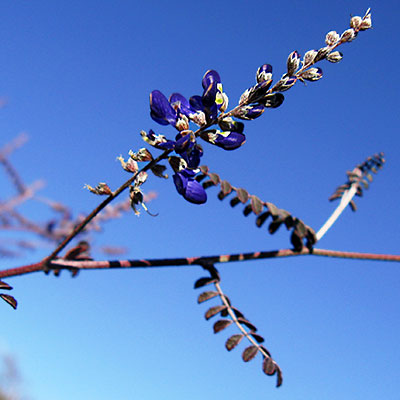
- Marina parryi

Scientific classification
- Kingdom: Plantae
- Clade: Tracheophytes
- Clade: Angiosperms
- Clade: Eudicots
- Clade: Rosids
- Order: Fabales
- Family: Fabaceae
- Subfamily: Faboideae
- Tribe: Amorpheae
- Genus: Marina; Liebm. (1853)

Species
- 40; see text

Synonyms
- Carroa C. Presl (1858); Trichopodium C. Presl (1845)

= Marina (plant) =

Genus of legumes

Marina is a genus in the legume family, Fabaceae. It includes 40 species native to southern North America, ranging from California and New Mexico through Mexico and Central America to Costa Rica. They are known as the false prairie clovers. Unlike the related prairie clovers (genus Dalea), which bear two ovules per fruit (with typically only one fully maturing to become a viable seed), false prairie clovers bear only one ovule per fruit.

== Species ==
Marina comprises the following species:

- Marina alamosana (Rydb.) Barneby
- Marina brevis León-de la Luz
- Marina calycosa (A. Gray) Barneby
- Marina capensis Barneby
- Marina catalinae Barneby
- Marina chrysorrhiza (A. Gray) Barneby
- Marina crenulata (Hook. & Arn.) Barneby
- Marina diffusa (Moric.) Barneby
- Marina dispansa (Rydb.) Barneby
- Marina divaricata (Benth.) Barneby
- Marina evanescens (Brandegee) Barneby
- Marina gemmea Barneby
- Marina ghiesbreghtii Barneby
- Marina goldmanii (Rose) Barneby
- Marina gracilis Liebm.
- Marina gracillima (S. Watson) Barneby
- Marina grammadenia Barneby
- Marina greenmaniana (Rose) Barneby
- Marina holwayi (Rose) Barneby
- Marina interstes Barneby
- Marina maritima (Brandegee) Barneby
- Marina melilotina Barneby
- Marina minor (Rose) Barneby
- Marina minutiflora (Rose) Barneby
- Marina neglecta (Robinson) Barneby
  - var. elongata (Rose) Barneby
  - var. neglecta (Robinson) Barneby
- Marina nutans (Cav.) Barneby
- Marina oculata (Rydb.) Barneby
- Marina orcuttii (S. Watson) Barneby
- Marina palmeri (Rose) Barneby
- Marina parryi (A. Gray) Barneby
- Marina peninsularis (Rose) Barneby
- Marina procumbens (DC.) Barneby
- Marina pueblensis (Brandegee) Barneby
- Marina sarodes Barneby
- Marina scopa Barneby
- Marina spiciformis (Rose) Barneby
- Marina stilligera Barneby
- Marina unifoliata (Robinson & Greenm.) Barneby
- Marina vetula (Brandegee) Barneby
- Marina victoriae León de la Luz
