= George Heinrich Adolf Scheele =

German botanist

George Heinrich Adolf Scheele (1808–1864) was a German botanist and 19th century explorer.

He was an expert on spermatophytes

Scheele was the first person to classify Cucurbita texana.

California

An important part of his botanical specimen collections are stored in the Herbarium of the California Academy of Sciences in San Francisco, California.

Author abbreviation
