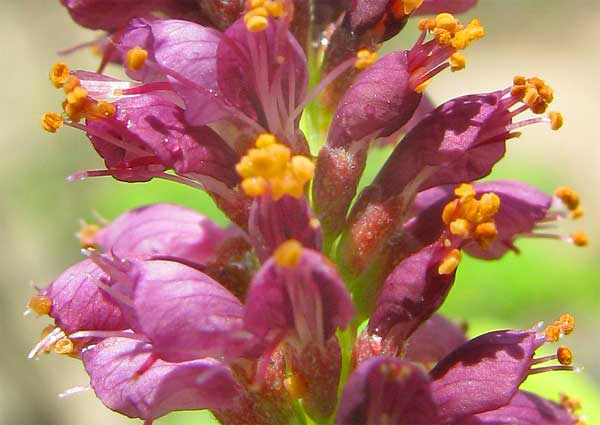
- Amorpha fruticosa

Scientific classification
- Kingdom: Plantae
- Clade: Tracheophytes
- Clade: Angiosperms
- Clade: Eudicots
- Clade: Rosids
- Order: Fabales
- Family: Fabaceae
- Subfamily: Faboideae
- Clade: Meso-Papilionoideae
- Clade: Dalbergioids
- Tribe: Amorpheae; Boriss. 1964 emend. Barneby 1977

Subclades and genera
- See text

Synonyms
- Daleeae Hutch.

= Amorpheae =

Tribe of legumes

The tribe Amorpheae is an early-branching clade within the flowering plant subfamily Faboideae or Papilionaceae. It is found from Mexico to Argentina. It was recently found to belong in a larger clade known informally as the dalbergioids sensu lato. This tribe is consistently resolved as monophyletic in molecular phylogenetic analyses. It is estimated to have arisen 36.9 ± 3.0 million years ago (in the Eocene). A node-based definition for Amorpheae is: "the MRCA of Psorothamnus arborescens and Eysenhardtia orthocarpa." The tribe exhibits the following morphological synapomorphies: "epidermal glands throughout the plant body; dry, indehiscent fruits that are single-seeded; and terminal inflorescences."

== Subclades and genera ==
=== Amorphoids ===
The amorphoids can be distinguished from the daleoids on the basis of their non-papilionaceous flowers.

- Amorpha L.
- Apoplanesia C. Presl
- Errazurizia Phil.
- Eysenhardtia Kunth
- Parryella Torr. & A. Gray

=== Daleoids ===
The daleoids can be distinguished from the amorphoids on the basis of their generally papilionaceous corollas.

- Dalea L.
- Marina Liebm.
- Psorothamnus Rydb.
