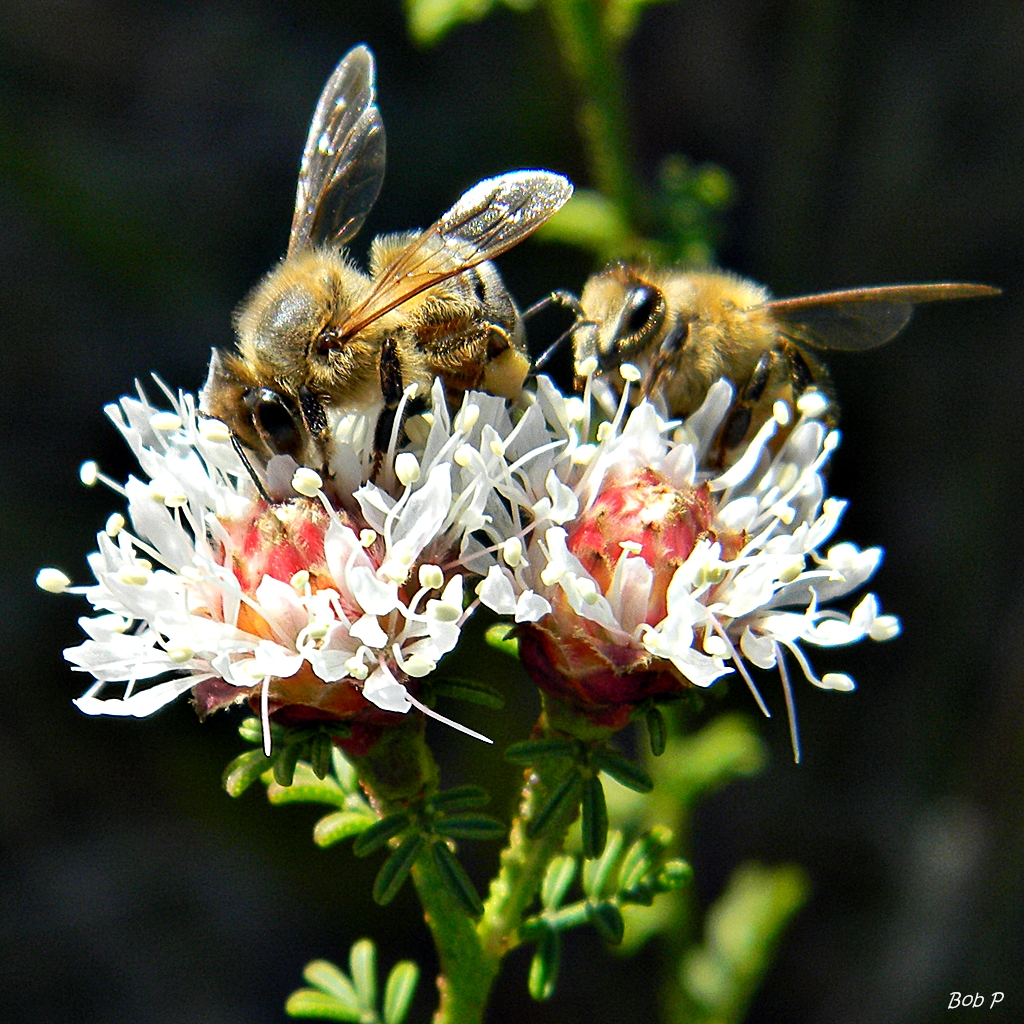
- Dalea pinnata flowers being visited by bees

Scientific classification
- Kingdom: Plantae
- Clade: Tracheophytes
- Clade: Angiosperms
- Clade: Eudicots
- Clade: Rosids
- Order: Fabales
- Family: Fabaceae
- Subfamily: Faboideae
- Clade: Meso-Papilionoideae
- Clade: Dalbergioids (M. F. Wojciechowski, M. Lavin, and M. J. Sanderson 2004) M. F. Wojciechowski 2013

Tribes
- Amorpheae; Amorphoids; Daleoids; Dalbergieae; Adesmia clade; Dalbergia clade; Pterocarpus clade

Synonyms
- Dalbergioids sensu lato

= Dalbergioids =

Clade of legumes

The dalbergioids are an early-branching monophyletic clade of the flowering plant subfamily Faboideae or Papilionaceae. They are pantropical, particularly being found in the neotropics and sub-Saharan Africa. One notable example is the peanut. This clade is consistently resolved as monophyletic in molecular phylogenetic analyses. It is estimated to have arisen 55.3 ± 0.5 million years ago (in the Eocene). A node-based definition for the dalbergioids is: "The least inclusive crown clade that contains Amorpha fruticosa L. 1753 and Dalbergia sissoo Roxb. ex DC. 1825." Indehiscent pods may be a morphological synapomorphy for the clade.
