= List of Jatropha species =

Jatropha is a genus of plants in the family Euphorbiaceae. As of March 2025, Plants of the World Online accepted 175 species.

== A ==
- Jatropha aceroides (Pax & K.Hoffm.) Hutch.
- Jatropha aethiopica Müll.Arg.
- Jatropha afrotuberosa Radcl.-Sm. & Govaerts
- Jatropha alamanii Müll.Arg.
- Jatropha andrieuxii Müll.Arg.
- Jatropha angustifolia Griseb.
- Jatropha aspleniifolia Pax
- Jatropha atacorensis A.Chev.
- Jatropha augusti Pax & K.Hoffm.

== B ==
- Jatropha bartlettii Wilbur
- Jatropha baumii Pax
- Jatropha botswanica Radcl.-Sm.
- Jatropha breviloba (Morong) Pax & K.Hoffm.
- Jatropha brockmanii Hutch.
- Jatropha bullockii E.J.Lott

== C ==
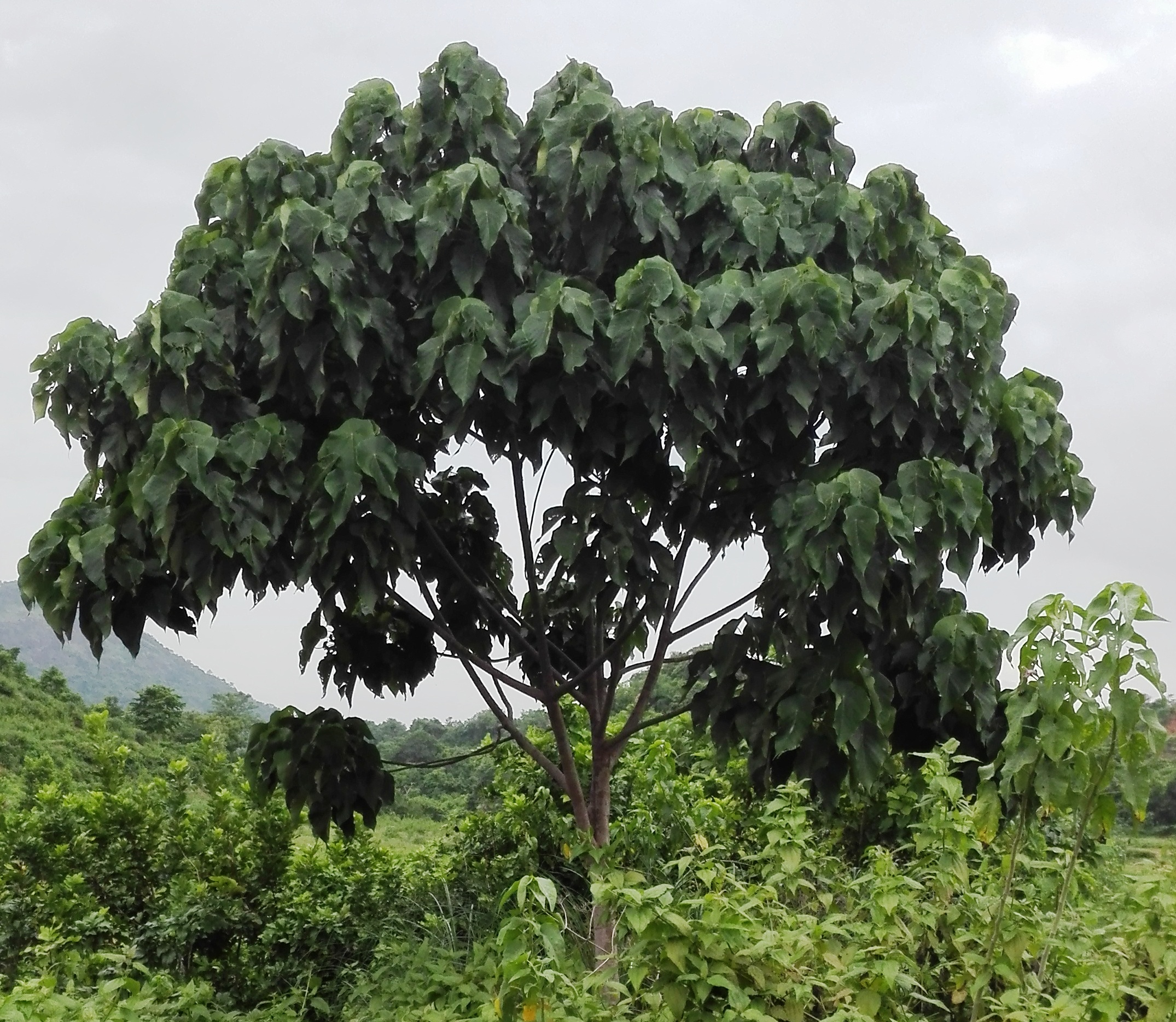
Jatropha curcas

- Jatropha calcarea Fern.Casas
- Jatropha campestris S.Moore
- Jatropha canescens (Benth.) Müll.Arg.
- Jatropha capensis (L.f.) Sond.
- Jatropha cardiophylla (Torr.) Müll.Arg.
- Jatropha cathartica Terán & Berland.
- Jatropha × ceballosii Fern.Casas
- Jatropha chamelensis Pérez-Jim.
- Jatropha chazaroi O.Sánch.-Sánch., J.Jiménez Ram. & Arzaba
- Jatropha chevalieri Beille
- Jatropha ciliata Sessé
- Jatropha cinerea (Ortega) Müll.Arg.
- Jatropha clavuligera Müll.Arg.
- Jatropha collina Thulin
- Jatropha confusa Hutch.
- Jatropha contrerasii J.Jiménez Ram. & Mart.Gord.
- Jatropha conzattii J.Jiménez Ram.
- Jatropha cordata (Ortega) Müll.Arg.
- Jatropha costaricensis G.L.Webster & Poveda
- Jatropha crinita Müll.Arg.
- Jatropha cuneata Wiggins & Rollins
- Jatropha curcas L.

== D ==
- Jatropha decipiens M.E.Jones
- Jatropha decumbens Pax & K.Hoffm.
- Jatropha dehganii J.Jiménez Ram.
- Jatropha dhofarica Radcl.-Sm.
- Jatropha dichtar J.F.Macbr.
- Jatropha dioica Sessé
- Jatropha dissecta (Chodat & Hassl.) Pax
- Jatropha divaricata Sw.

== E ==
- Jatropha elbae J.Jiménez Ram.
- Jatropha ellenbeckii Pax
- Jatropha elliptica (Pohl) Oken
- Jatropha erythropoda Pax & K.Hoffm.
- Jatropha euarguta M.G.Gilbert & Thulin
- Jatropha excisa Griseb.

== F ==
- Jatropha flavovirens Pax & K.Hoffm.
- Jatropha fremontioides Standl.

== G ==
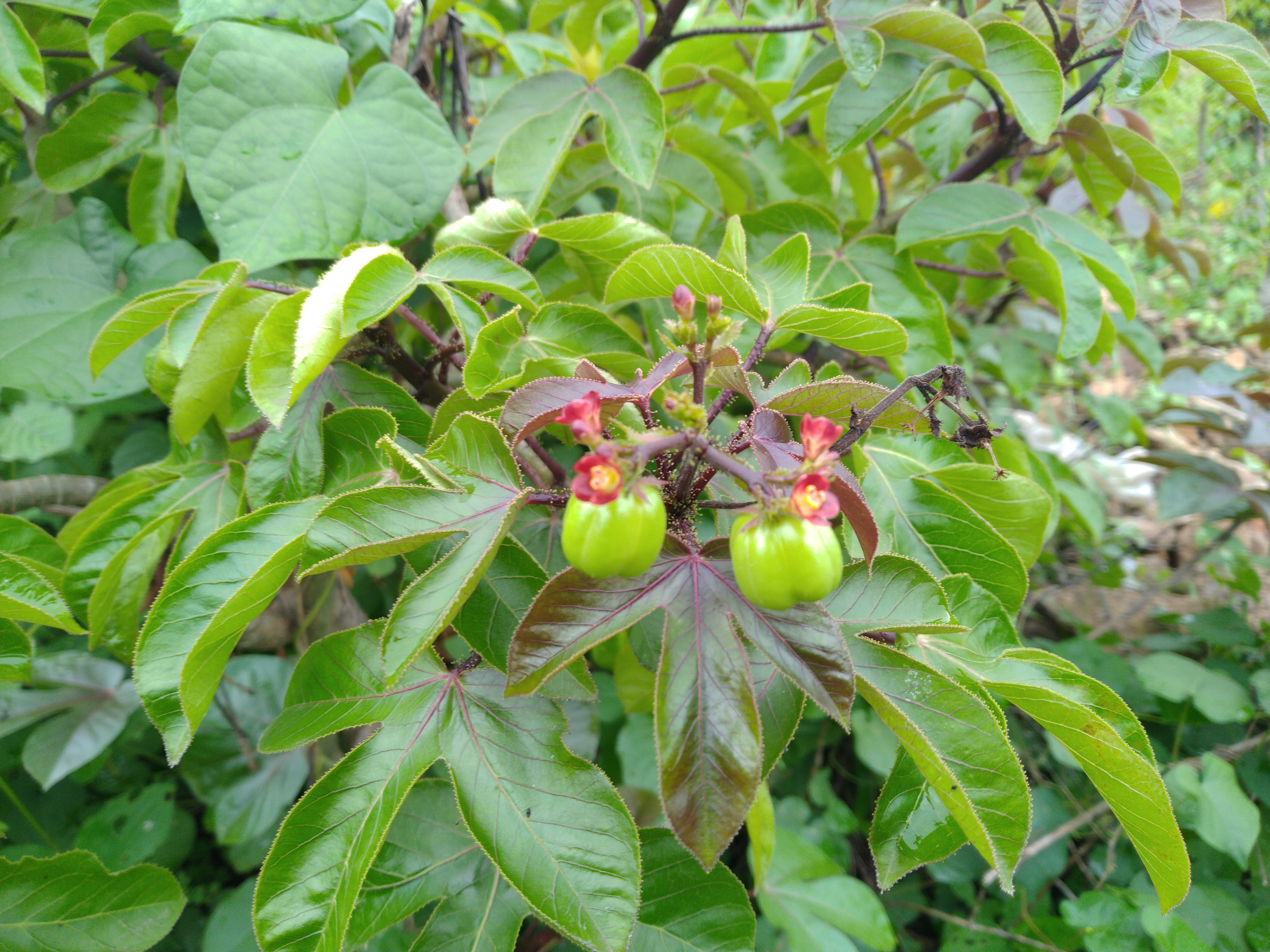
Jatropha gossypiifolia

- Jatropha gallabatensis Schweinf.
- Jatropha galvanii J.Jiménez Ram. & L.M.Contr.
- Jatropha gaumeri Greenm.
- Jatropha giffordiana Dehgan & G.L.Webster
- Jatropha glandulifera Roxb.
- Jatropha glauca Vahl
- Jatropha glaucovirens Pax & K.Hoffm.
- Jatropha gossypiifolia L.
- Jatropha grossidentata Pax & K.Hoffm.
- Jatropha guaranitica Speg.

== H ==
- Jatropha × hastifolia Fern.Casas
- Jatropha hernandiifolia Vent.
- Jatropha heynei N.P.Balakr.
- Jatropha hieronymi Kuntze
- Jatropha hildebrandtii Pax
- Jatropha hirsuta Hochst.
- Jatropha horizontalis M.G.Gilbert
- Jatropha humboldtiana McVaugh
- Jatropha humifusa Thulin
- Jatropha hypogyna Radcl.-Sm. & Thulin

== I ==
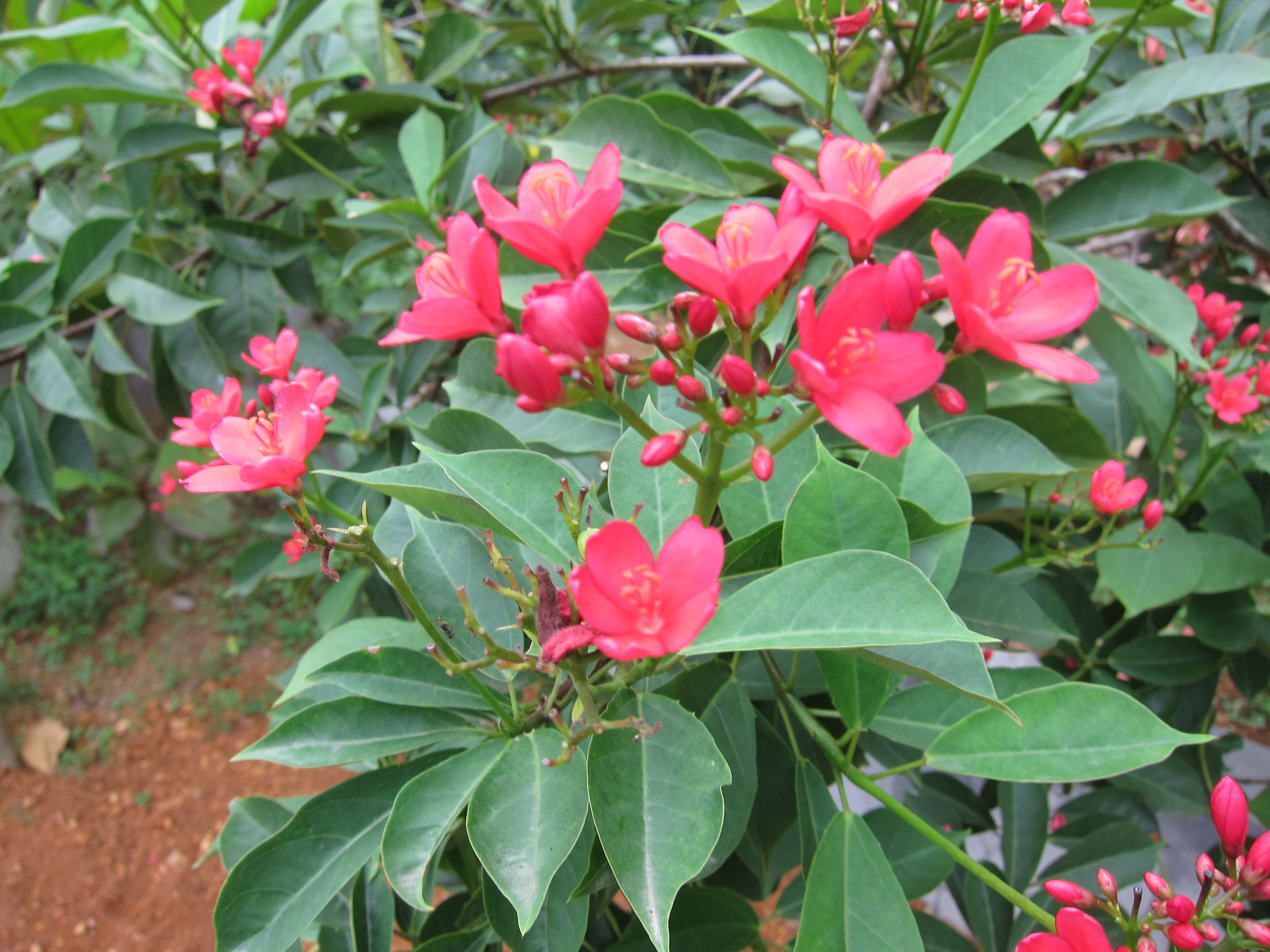
Jatropha integerrima

- Jatropha inaequispina Thulin
- Jatropha integerrima Jacq.
- Jatropha intermedia (Chodat & Hassl.) Pax
- Jatropha isabellei Müll.Arg.

== J ==
- Jatropha jaimejimenezii V.W.Steinm.

== K ==
- Jatropha kamerunica Pax & K.Hoffm.
- Jatropha krusei J.Jiménez Ram. & Mart.Gord.

== L ==
- Jatropha lagarinthoides Sond.
- Jatropha latifolia Pax
- Jatropha longibracteata A.S.Moreira & Carn.-Torres
- Jatropha loristipula Radcl.-Sm.

== M ==
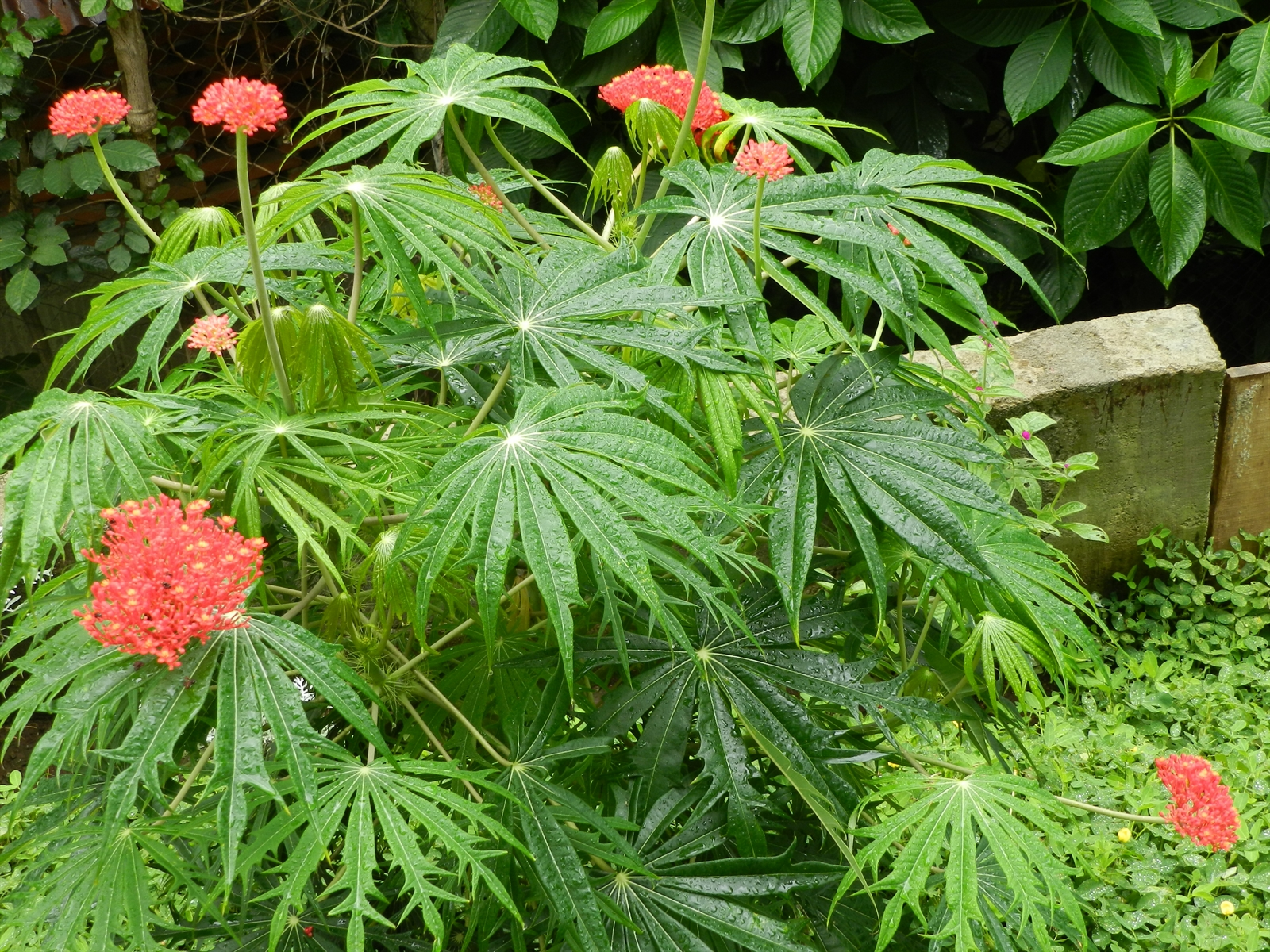
Jatropha multifida

- Jatropha macrantha Müll.Arg.
- Jatropha macrocarpa Griseb.
- Jatropha macrophylla Pax & K.Hoffm.
- Jatropha macrorhiza Benth.
- Jatropha mahafalensis Jum. & H.Perrier
- Jatropha maheshwarii Subram. & M.P.Nayar
- Jatropha malacophylla Standl.
- Jatropha marginata Chiov.
- Jatropha marmorata Thulin
- Jatropha martiusii (Pohl) Baill.
- Jatropha mcvaughii Dehgan & G.L.Webster
- Jatropha melanosperma Pax
- Jatropha microdonta Radcl.-Sm.
- Jatropha mirandana J.Jiménez Ram. & K.Vega
- Jatropha miskatensis Thulin
- Jatropha mollis Pax
- Jatropha mollissima (Pohl) Baill.
- Jatropha monroi S.Moore
- Jatropha moranii Dehgan & G.L.Webster
- Jatropha multifida L.
- Jatropha mutabilis (Pohl) Baill.

== N ==
- Jatropha nana Dalzell & A.Gibson
- Jatropha natalensis Müll.Arg.
- Jatropha neopauciflora Pax
- Jatropha neriifolia Müll.Arg.
- Jatropha nogalensis Chiov.
- Jatropha nudicaulis Benth.

== O ==
- Jatropha oaxacana J.Jiménez Ram. & R.Torres
- Jatropha obbiadensis Chiov.
- Jatropha oblanceolata Radcl.-Sm.
- Jatropha orangeana Dinter ex P.G.Mey.
- Jatropha ortegae Standl.

== P ==
- Jatropha pachypoda Pax
- Jatropha pachyrrhiza Radcl.-Sm.
- Jatropha paganuccii A.S.Moreira & Carn.-Torres
- Jatropha palmatifida Baker
- Jatropha palmatipartita Dehgan
- Jatropha paradoxa (Chiov.) Chiov.
- Jatropha pauciflora C.Wright ex Griseb.
- Jatropha paxii Croizat
- Jatropha pedersenii Lourteig
- Jatropha peiranoi Lourteig & O'Donell
- Jatropha pelargoniifolia Courbon
- Jatropha peltata Sessé
- Jatropha pereziae J.Jiménez Ram.
- Jatropha phillipseae Rendle
- Jatropha podagrica Hook.
- Jatropha prunifolia Pax
- Jatropha pseudocurcas Müll.Arg.
- Jatropha purpurea Rose

== R ==
- Jatropha ribifolia (Pohl) Baill.
- Jatropha riojae Miranda
- Jatropha rivae Pax
- Jatropha robecchii Pax
- Jatropha rosea Radcl.-Sm.
- Jatropha rufescens Brandegee
- Jatropha rzedowskii J.Jiménez Ram.

== S ==
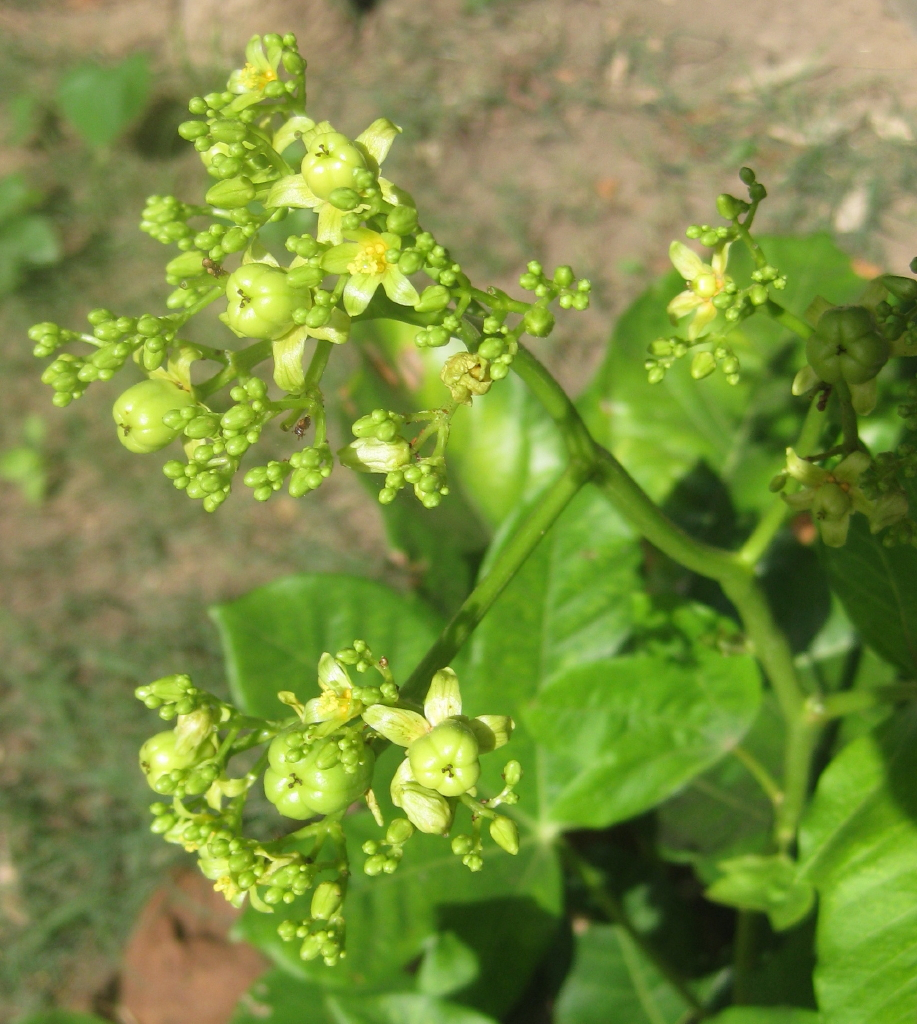
Jatropha scaposa

- Jatropha scaposa Radcl.-Sm.
- Jatropha schlechteri Pax
- Jatropha schweinfurthii Pax
- Jatropha seineri Pax
- Jatropha somalensis Pax
- Jatropha sotoi-nunyezii Fern.Casas & E.Martínez
- Jatropha spicata Pax
- Jatropha spinosa Vahl
- Jatropha spinosissima Thulin
- Jatropha standleyi Steyerm.
- Jatropha stephani J.Jiménez Ram. & Mart.Gord.
- Jatropha stevensii G.L.Webster
- Jatropha stuhlmannii Pax
- Jatropha subaequiloba Radcl.-Sm.
- Jatropha sympetala S.F.Blake & Standl.

== T ==
- Jatropha tanjorensis J.L.Ellis & Saroja
- Jatropha tehuantepecana J.Jiménez Ram. & A.Campos Vilb.
- Jatropha tenuicaulis Thulin
- Jatropha tetracantha Chiov.
- Jatropha tlalcozotitlanensis J.Jiménez Ram.
- Jatropha trifida Chiov.
- Jatropha tropaeolifolia Pax
- Jatropha tupifolia Griseb.

== U ==
- Jatropha uncinulata Radcl.-Sm.
- Jatropha unicostata Balf.f.

== V ==
- Jatropha variabilis Radcl.-Sm.
- Jatropha variegata Vahl
- Jatropha variifolia Pax
- Jatropha velutina Pax & K.Hoffm.
- Jatropha vernicosa Brandegee
- Jatropha villosa Wight

== W ==
- Jatropha weberbaueri Pax & K.Hoffm.
- Jatropha websteri J.Jiménez Ram.
- Jatropha weddeliana Baill.
- Jatropha woodii Kuntze

== Z ==
- Jatropha zeyheri Sond.
