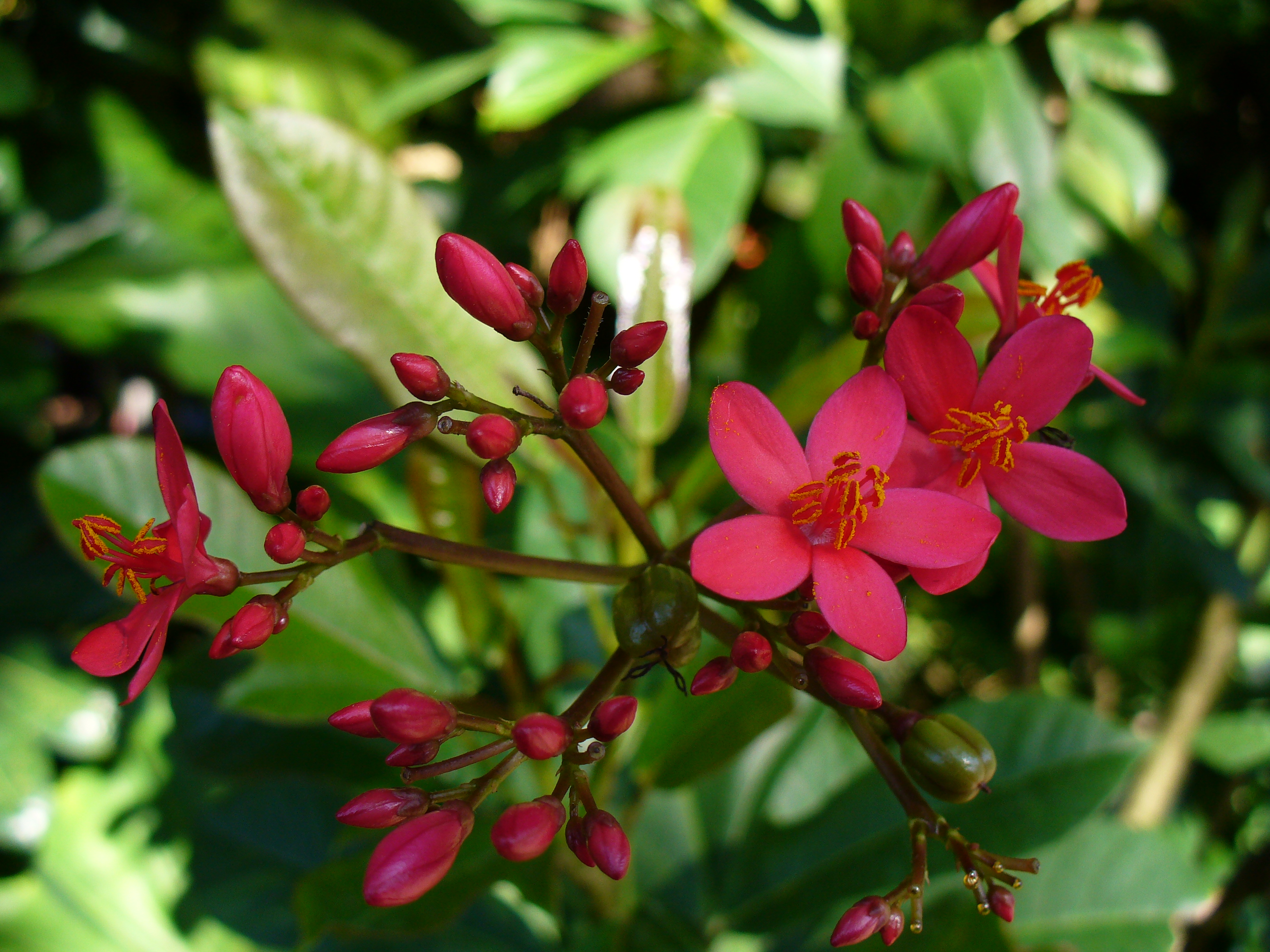
- Spicy Jatropha (Jatropha integerrima)

Scientific classification
- Kingdom: Plantae
- Clade: Embryophytes
- Clade: Tracheophytes
- Clade: Angiosperms
- Clade: Eudicots
- Clade: Rosids
- Order: Malpighiales
- Family: Euphorbiaceae
- Subfamily: Crotonoideae
- Tribe: Jatropheae
- Genus: Jatropha; L.

Diversity
- c. 180 species

Synonyms
- Adenorhopium Rchb.; Adenoropium Pohl; Castiglionia Ruiz & Pav.; Collenucia Chiov.; Curcas Adans.; Mazinna Spach; Mesandrinia Raf.; Mozinna Ortega; Ricinoides Mill.; Zimapania Engl. & Pax

= Jatropha =

Genus of flowering plants in the spurge family

Jatropha is a genus of flowering plants in the spurge family, Euphorbiaceae. The name is derived from the Greek words ἰατρός (iatros), meaning "physician", and τροφή (trophe), meaning "nutrition", hence the common name physic nut. Another common name is nettlespurge. It contains approximately 180 species of succulent plants, shrubs and trees (some are deciduous, like Jatropha curcas). Most of these are native to the Americas, with 66 species found in the Old World. Plants produce separate male and female flowers. As with many members of the family Euphorbiaceae, Jatropha contains compounds that are highly toxic. Jatropha species have traditionally been used in basketmaking, tanning and dye production. In the 2000s, one species, Jatropha curcas, generated interest as an oil crop for biodiesel production and also medicinal importance when used as lamp oil; native Mexicans in the Veracruz area developed by selective breeding a Jatropha curcas variant lacking the toxic compounds, yielding a better income when used as source for biodiesel, because of its edible byproduct. Toxicity may return if edible Jatropha is pollinated by toxic types.

== Uses ==
The stems of haat (Jatropha cuneata) are used for basketmaking by the Seri people in Sonora, Mexico. The stems are roasted, split and soaked through an elaborate process. The reddish dye that is often used is made from the root of another plant species, Krameria grayi. Spicy jatropha (J. integerrima) is cultivated as an ornamental in the tropics for its continuously blooming crimson flowers. Buddha belly plant (J. podagrica) was used to tan leather and produce a red dye in Mexico and the southwestern United States. It is also used as a house plant.

The oil from Jatropha curcas is mainly converted into biodiesel for use in diesel engines. The cake resulting from oil extraction, a protein-rich product, can be used for fish or animal feed (if detoxified). It is also a biomass feedstock to power electricity plants or to produce biogas, and a high-quality organic fertilizer.

In 2007, Goldman Sachs cited Jatropha curcas as one of the best candidates for future biodiesel production. It is resistant to drought and pests, and produces seeds containing 27–40% oil, averaging 34.4%. The remaining press cake of jatropha seeds after oil extraction could also be considered for energy production. However, despite their abundance and use as oil and reclamation plants, none of the Jatropha species have been properly domesticated and, as a result, their productivity is variable, and the long-term impact of their large-scale use on soil quality and the environment is unknown. 2009 research found that Jatropha biodiesel production requires significantly more water than other common biofuel crops, and that initial yield estimates were high. Earlier, higher estimates from Worldwatch Institute had suggested that 1 acre of cultivation could yield 202 gallons (4.8 barrels) of biodiesel.

Jatropha curcas is also being studied for use as a carbon sequestration plant in arid regions.

== Toxicity ==
Much like other members of the family Euphorbiaceae, members of the genus Jatropha contain several toxic compounds. The seeds of Jatropha curcas contain toxic lectin dimers and carcinogenic phorbol esters. Despite this, the seeds are occasionally eaten after roasting, which reduces some of the toxicity. Its sap is a skin irritant, and ingesting as few as three untreated seeds can be fatal to humans. In 2005, Western Australia banned Jatropha gossypiifolia as invasive and highly toxic to people and animals. It continues to be used as a medicine in certain geographic regions; however, one study found the dried leaf to have no anti-fungal activity.

== Selected species ==
- Jatropha bullockii E.J.Lott
- Jatropha cathartica Terán & Berland. – Berlandier's nettlespurge
- Jatropha chamelensis Pérez-Jiménez
- Jatropha costaricensis G.L.Webster & Poveda
- Jatropha curcas L. – physic nut, piñoncillo, habb-el-melúk
- Jatropha dioica Sessé – leatherstem
- Jatropha elliptica (Pohl) Oken
- Jatropha gossypiifolia L. – bellyache bush
- Jatropha integerrima Jacq. – spicy jatropha, called in Chinese "ri ri ying", which means "every-day-flowered cherry blossom"
- Jatropha macrantha Mull. Arg – Huanarpo macho or Peruvian Viagra
- Jatropha moranii Dehgan & G.L.Webster
- Jatropha multifida L. – coralbush
- Jatropha nudicaulis Benth.
- Jatropha podagrica Hook. – Buddha belly plant, bottleplant shrub
- Jatropha rivae Pax
- Jatropha unicostata Balf.f.

== Gallery ==
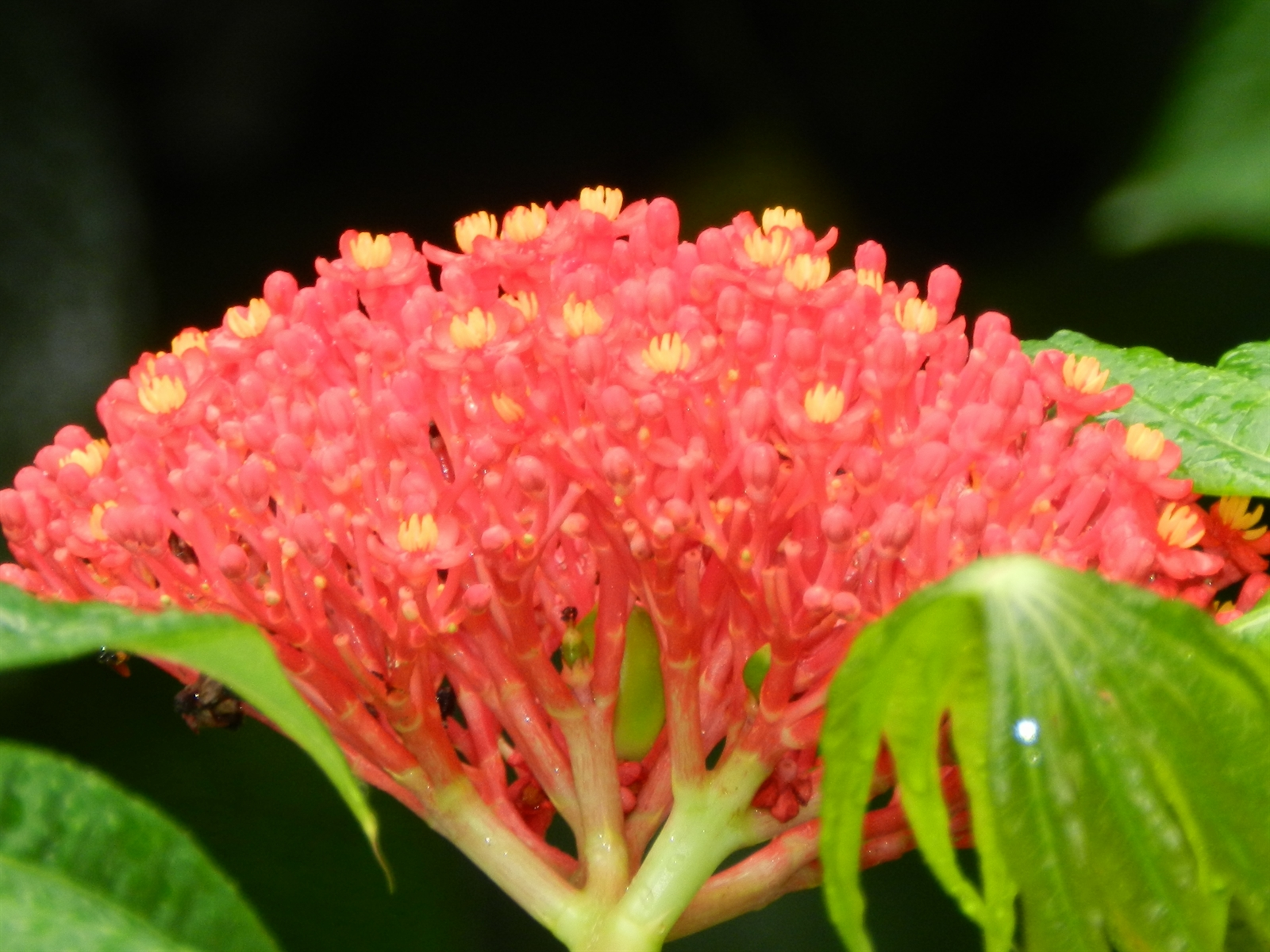
Flowers of Jatropha multifida in El Crucero, Managua, Nicaragua

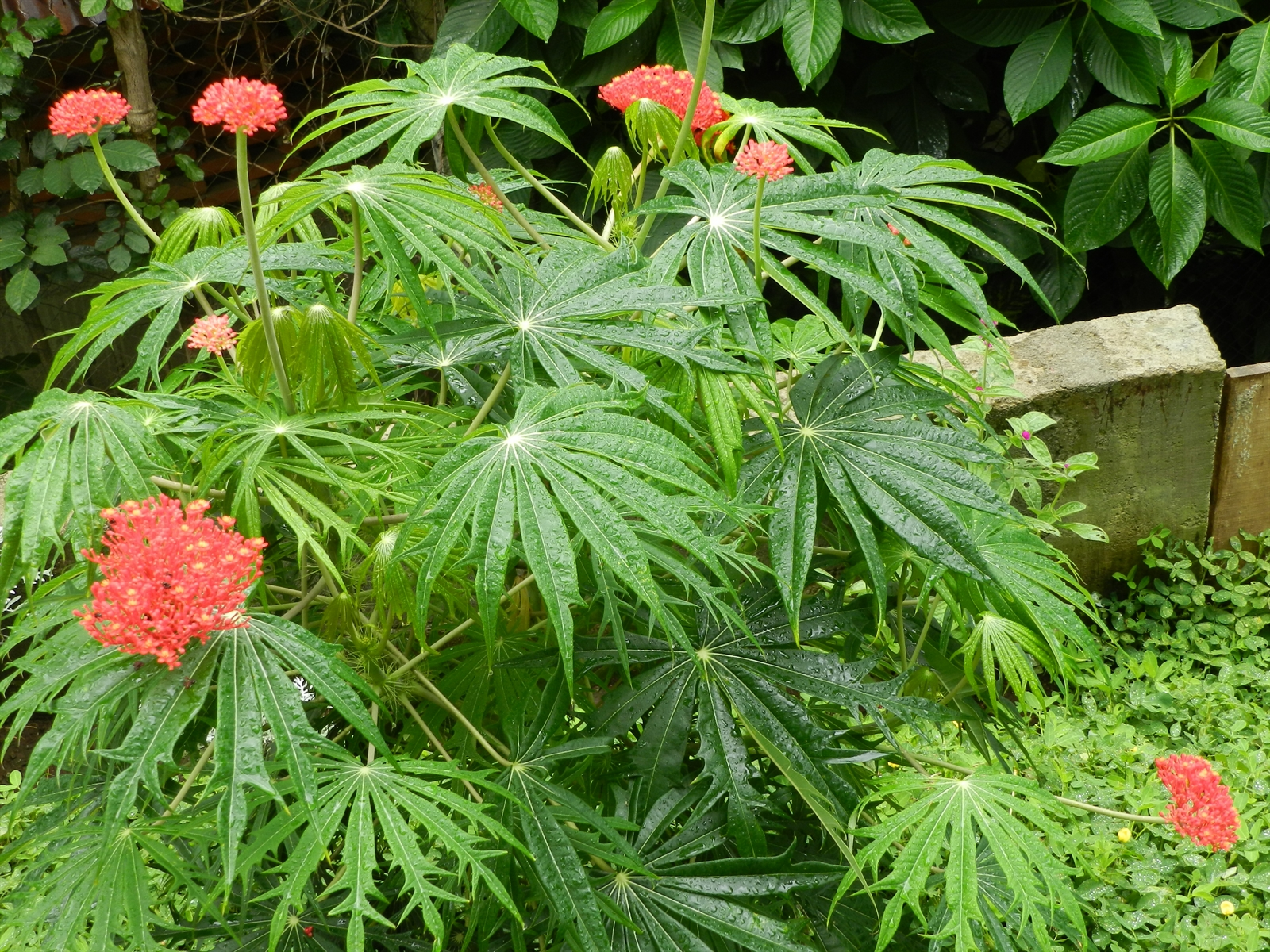
Jatropha multifida plant in El Crucero, Managua, Nicaragua

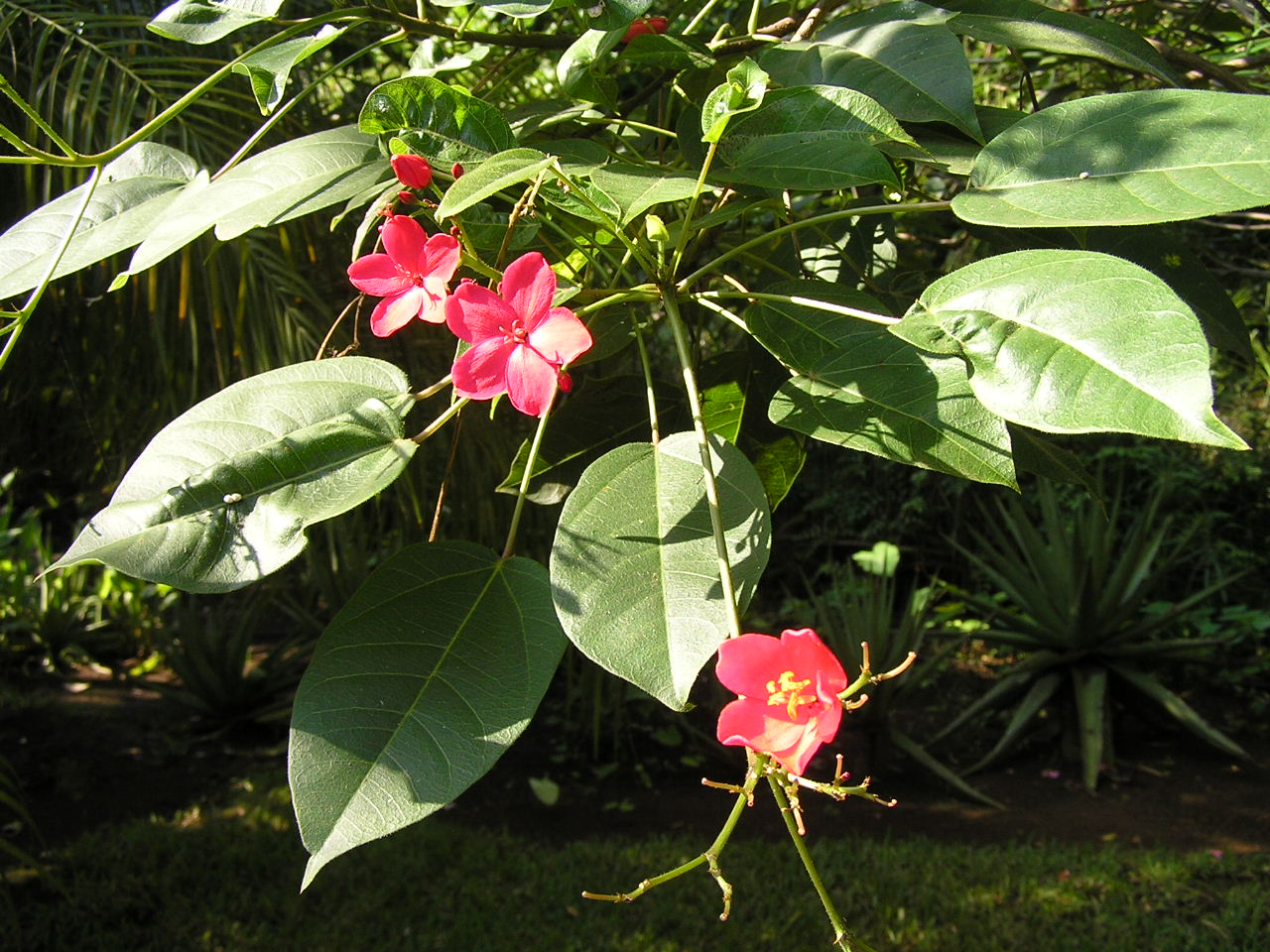
Jatropha integerrima

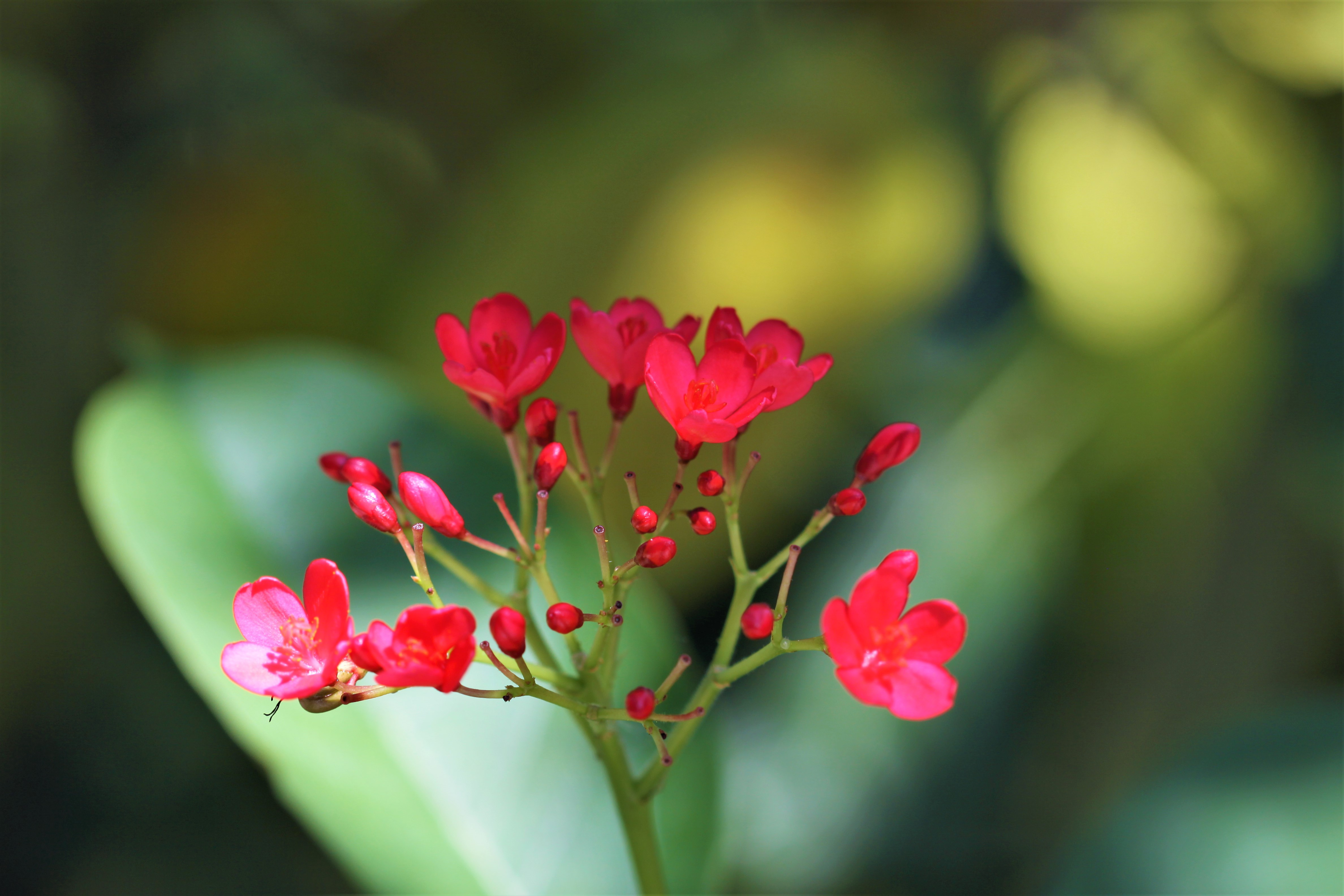
Jatropha integerrima in Thailand

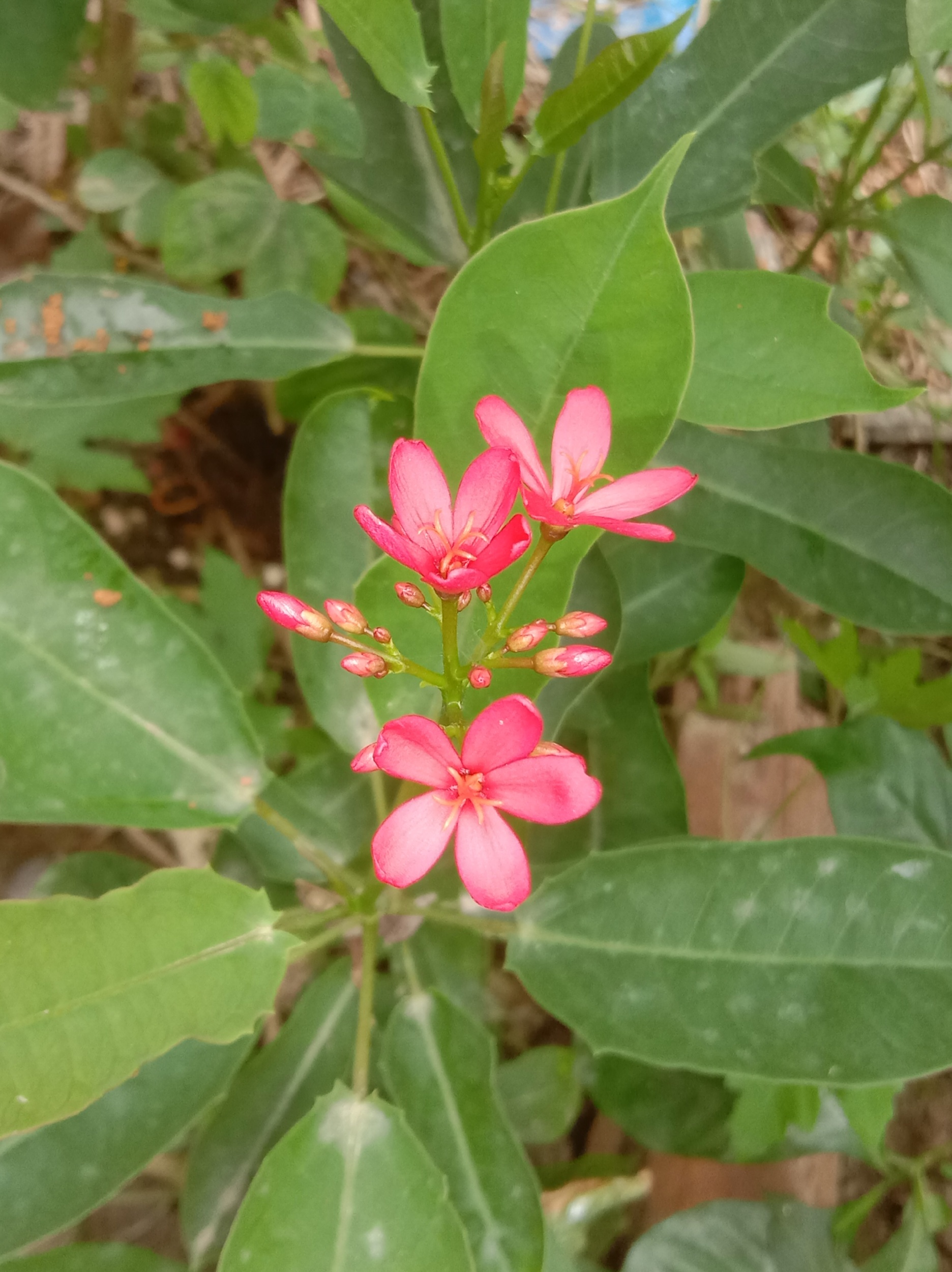
Jatropha integerrima in West Bengal, India

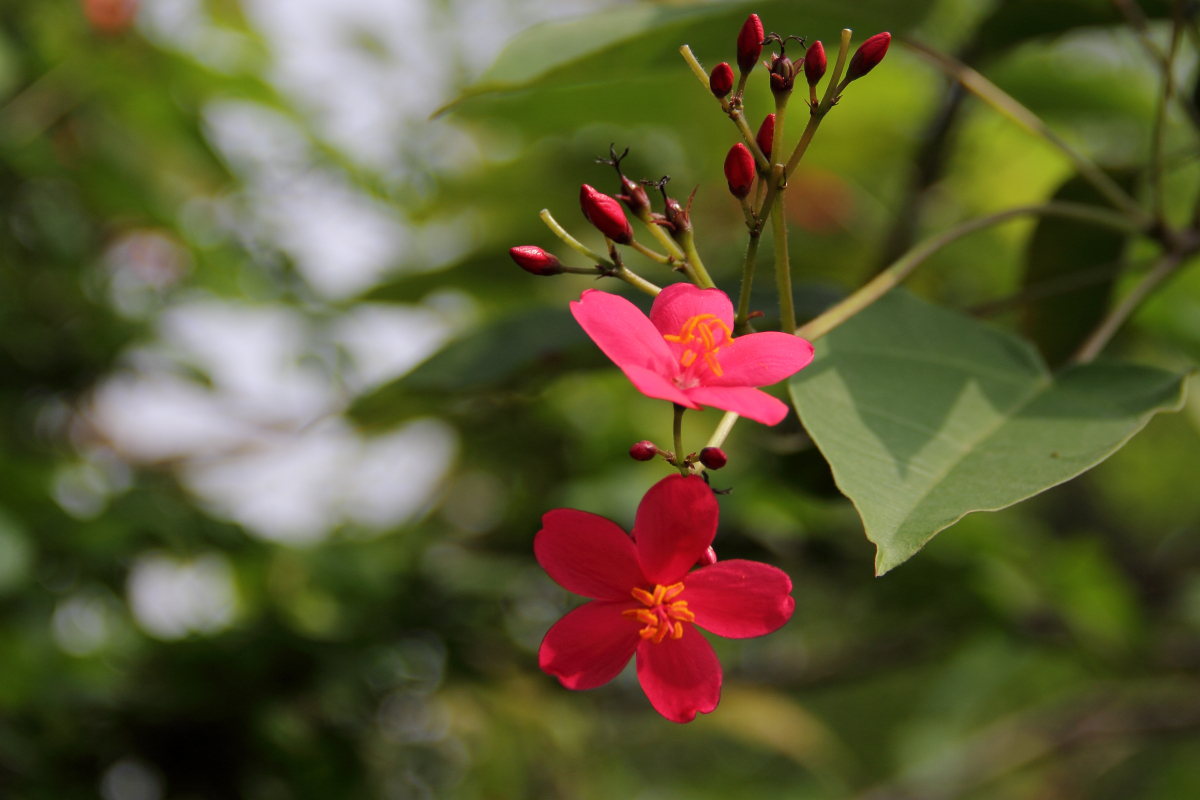
Jatropha pandurifolia in China

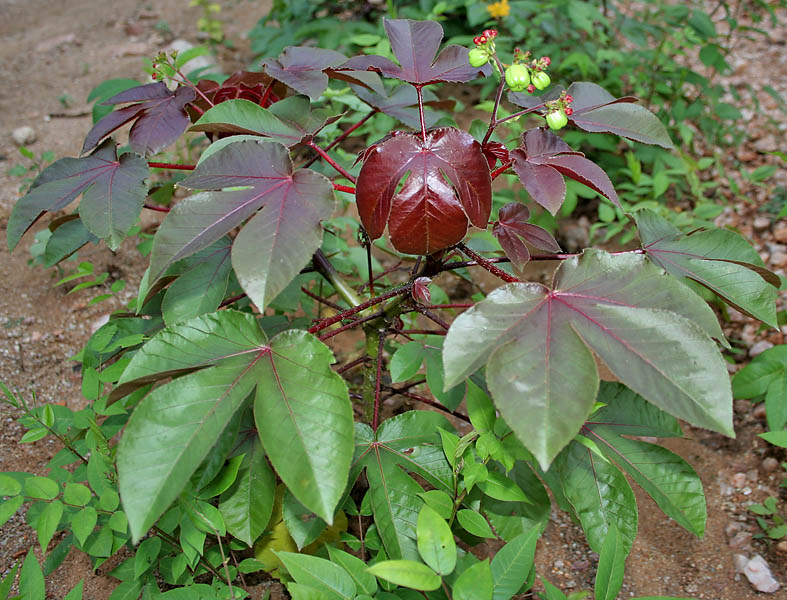
Jatropha gossypiifolia in Hyderabad, India

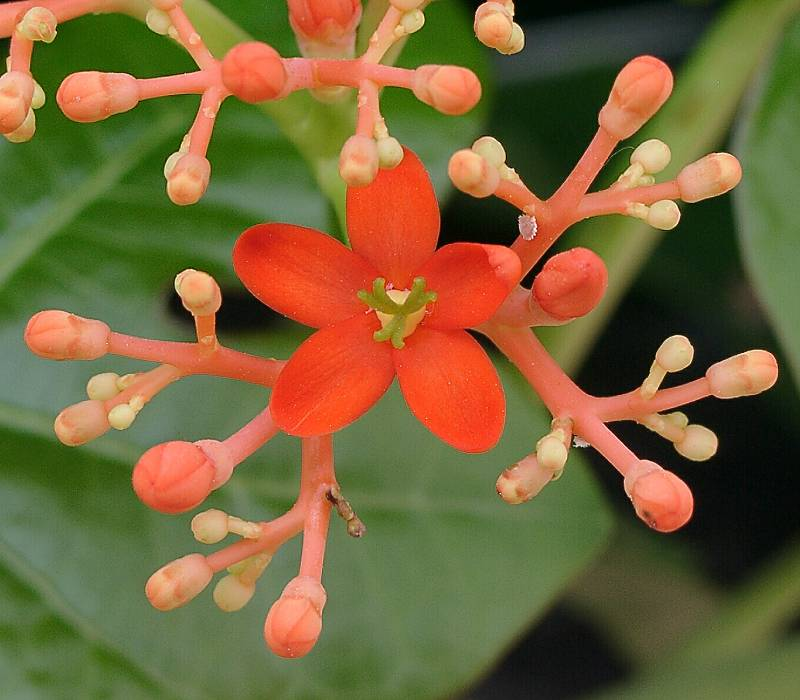
Jatropha podagrica

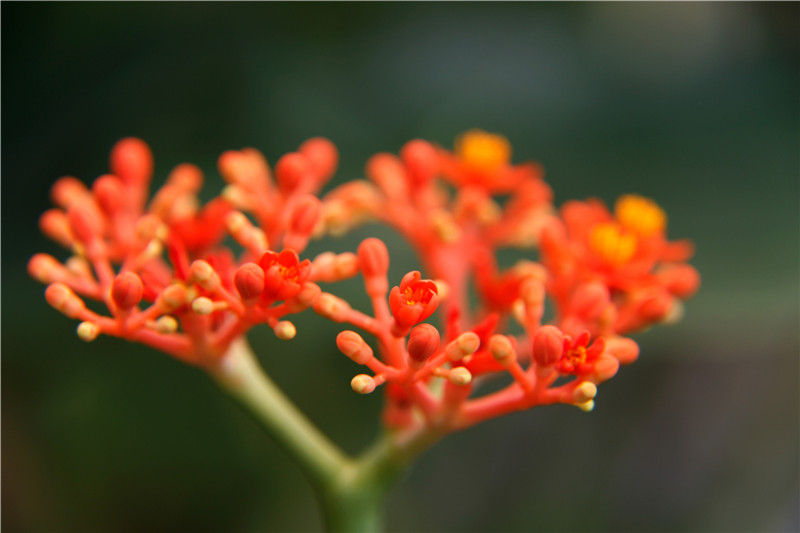
Close-up of Jatropha podagrica

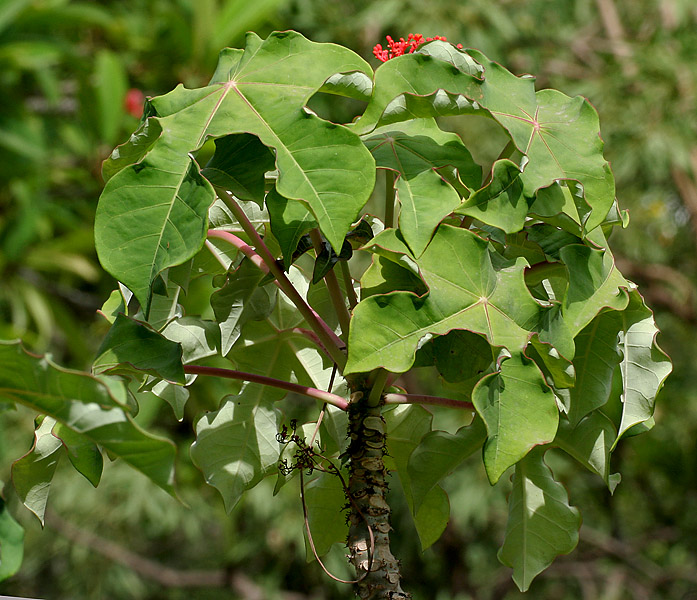
Jatropha podagrica in Hyderabad, India

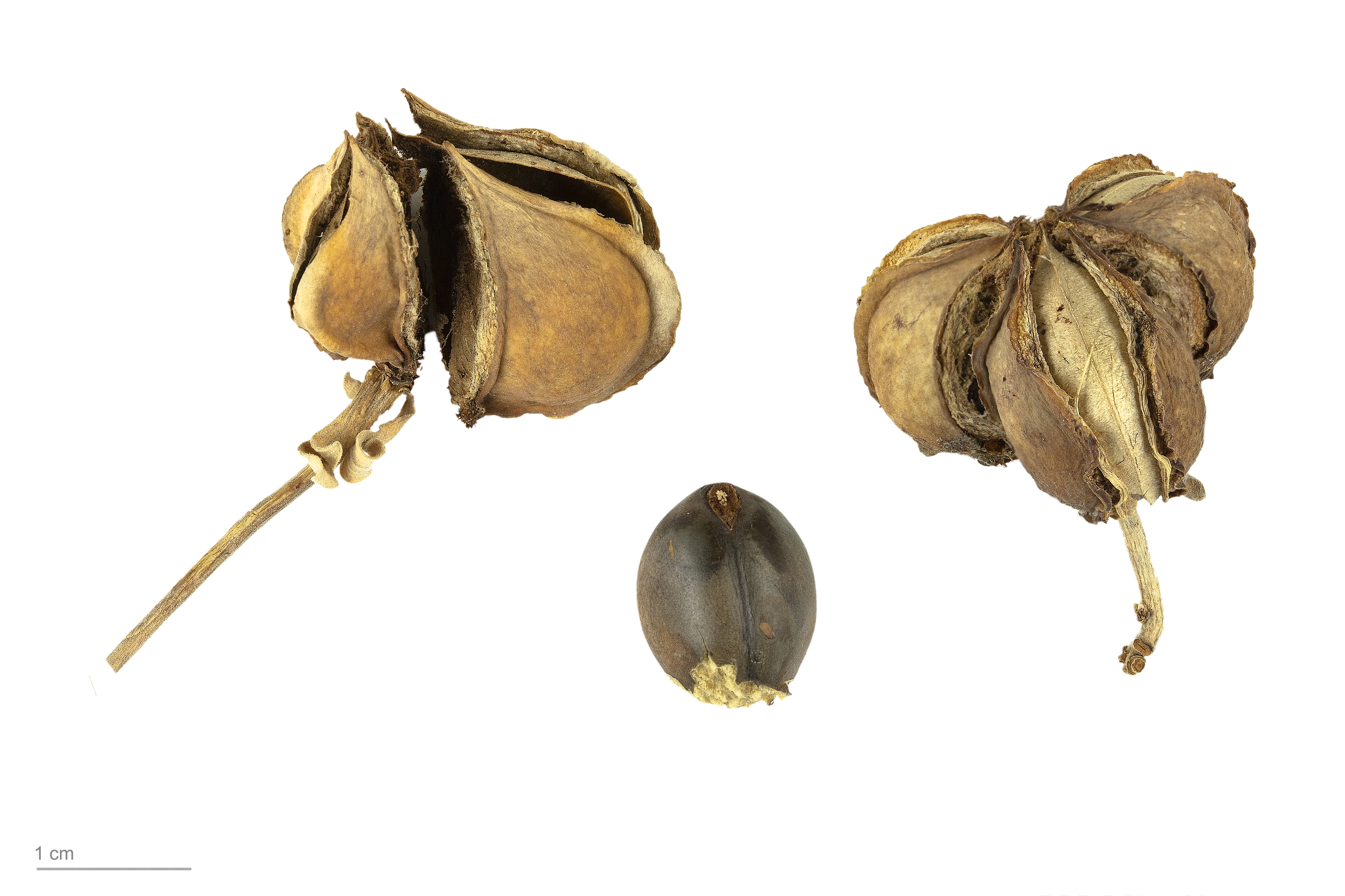
Jatropha cinerea - MHNT

=== Formerly placed here ===
- Aleurites moluccanus (L.) Willd. (as J. moluccana L.)
- Baliospermum solanifolium (Willd.) Müll.Arg. (as J. montana Willd.)
- Cnidoscolus aconitifolius (Mill.) I.M.Johnst. (as J. aconitifolia Mill.)
- Cnidoscolus angustidens Torr. (as J. angustidens (Torr.) Müll.Arg.)
- Cnidoscolus quercifolius Pohl (as J. phyllacantha Müll.Arg.)
- Cnidoscolus stimulosus (Michx.) Engelm. & A.Gray (as J. stimulosa Michx.)
- Cnidoscolus texanus (Müll. Arg.) Small (as J. texana Müll.Arg.)
- Cnidoscolus tubulosus (Müll. Arg.) I.M.Johnst. (as J. tepiquensis Costantin & Gallaud and J. tubulosa Müll.Arg.)
- Cnidoscolus urens (L.) Arthur (as J. urens L.)
- Hyaenanche globosa (Gaertn.) Lamb. (as J. globosa Gaertn.)
- Manihot esculenta subsp. esculenta (as J. dulcis J.F.Gmel. and J. manihot L.)
- Manihot carthagenensis subsp. carthagenensis (as J. carthagenensis Jacq.)
- Manihot tripartita subsp. tripartita (as J. tripartita Spreng.)
