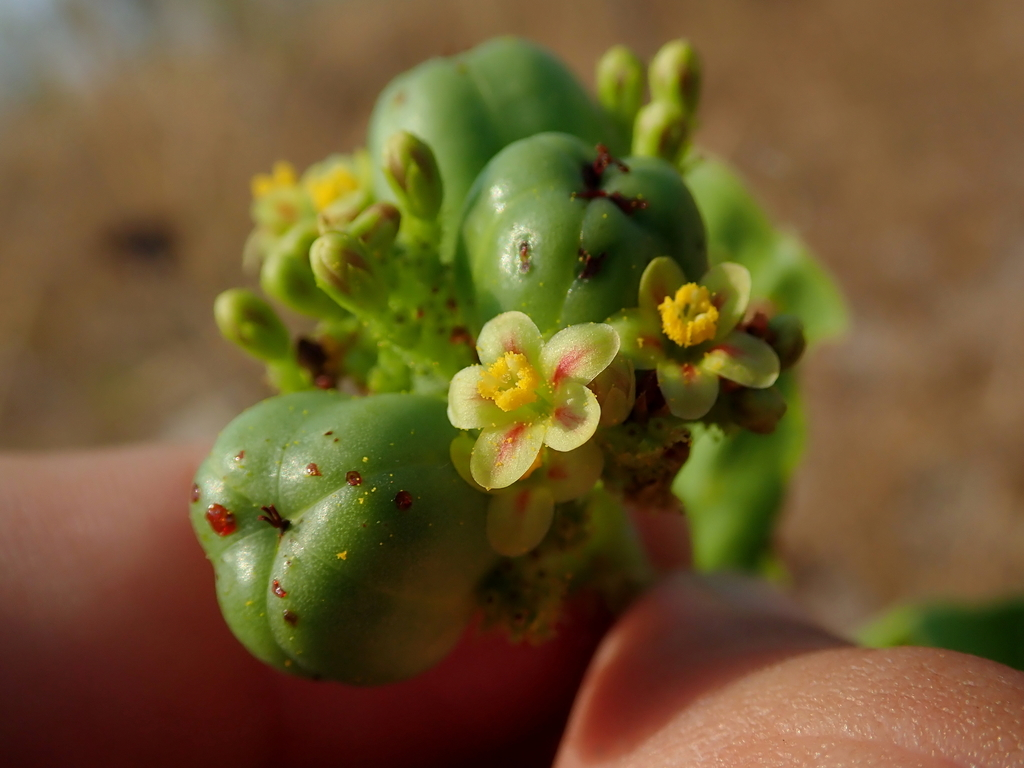

Scientific classification
- Kingdom: Plantae
- Clade: Tracheophytes
- Clade: Angiosperms
- Clade: Eudicots
- Clade: Rosids
- Order: Malpighiales
- Family: Euphorbiaceae
- Genus: Jatropha
- Species: J. elliptica

Binomial name
- Jatropha elliptica (Pohl) Oken

Synonyms
- Adenoropium ellipticum Pohl; Adenoropium opiferum (Mart.) Mart.; Jatropha eglandulosa Pax; Jatropha elliptica var. guaranitica Chodat & Hassl.; Jatropha lacertii Silva Manso; Jatropha opifera Mart.

= Jatropha elliptica =

Species of flowering plant

Jatropha elliptica is a species of flowering plant, a shrub in the family Euphorbiaceae.

The species is native to Bolivia, Brazil, and Paraguay.

It is used in folk medicine to treat itches, snake bites, syphilis, ulcer, urinary discharge, neoplasia, and abdominal issues. Studies on the species have shown it has chemical and medicinal properties. One study stated that this species has antibothropic and anti-inflammatory properties.
