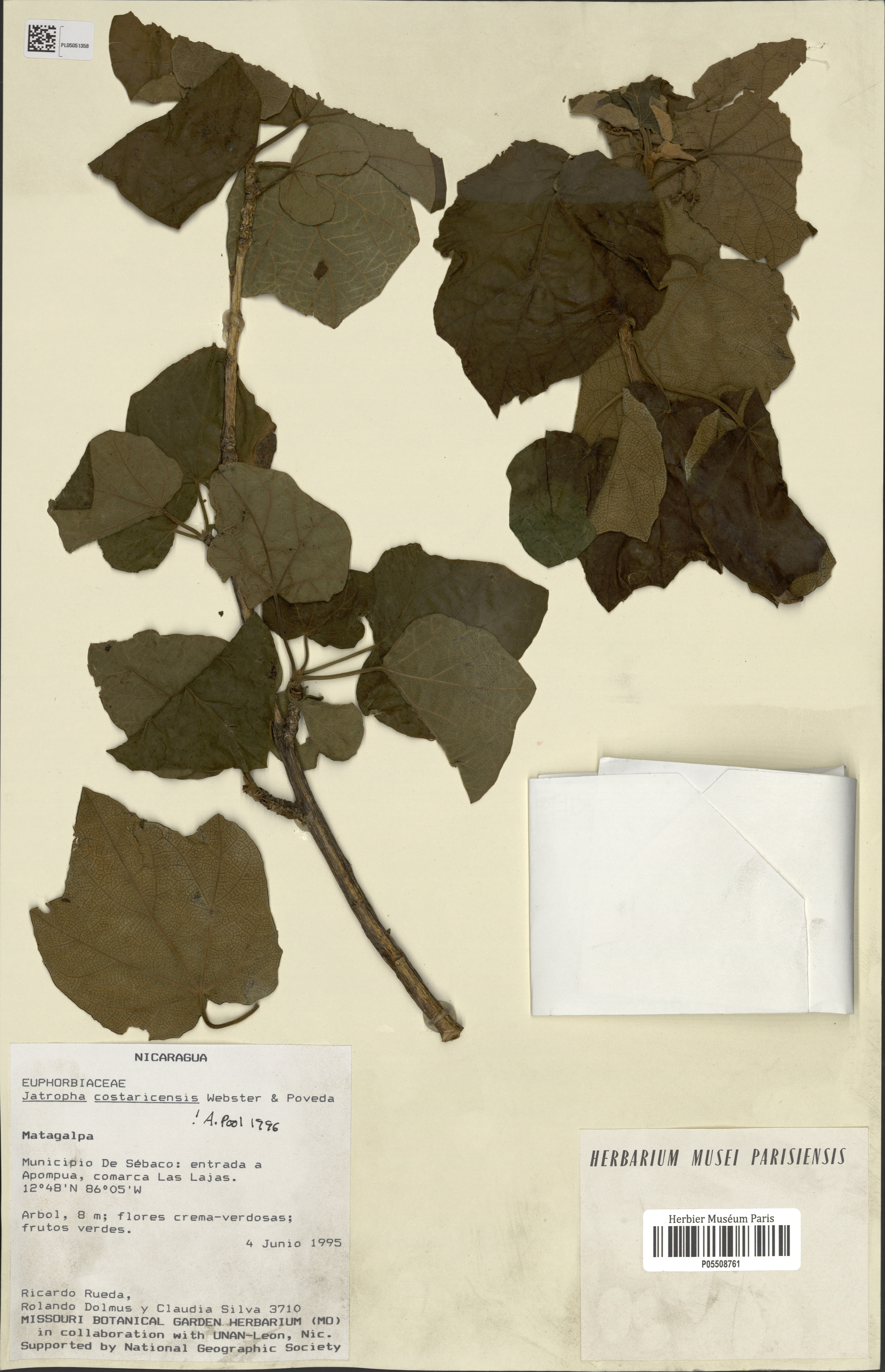

Conservation status
- Endangered (IUCN 3.1)

- Endangered (ESA)

Scientific classification
- Kingdom: Plantae
- Clade: Tracheophytes
- Clade: Angiosperms
- Clade: Eudicots
- Clade: Rosids
- Order: Malpighiales
- Family: Euphorbiaceae
- Genus: Jatropha
- Species: J. costaricensis

Binomial name
- Jatropha costaricensis G.L.Webster & Poveda

= Jatropha costaricensis =

Species of flowering plant

Jatropha costaricensis is a rare species of flowering plant in the euphorb family known by the common name Costa Rican jatropha. It is native to Costa Rica, Guatemala and Nicaragua.

First discovered in 1974 and described to science in 1978, this species was added to the endangered species list of the United States in 1984 because it was in danger of extinction and was not protected under any Costa Rican or international laws. At that time there was only one population known, located near Playas del Coco in Guanacaste Province, Costa Rica.
