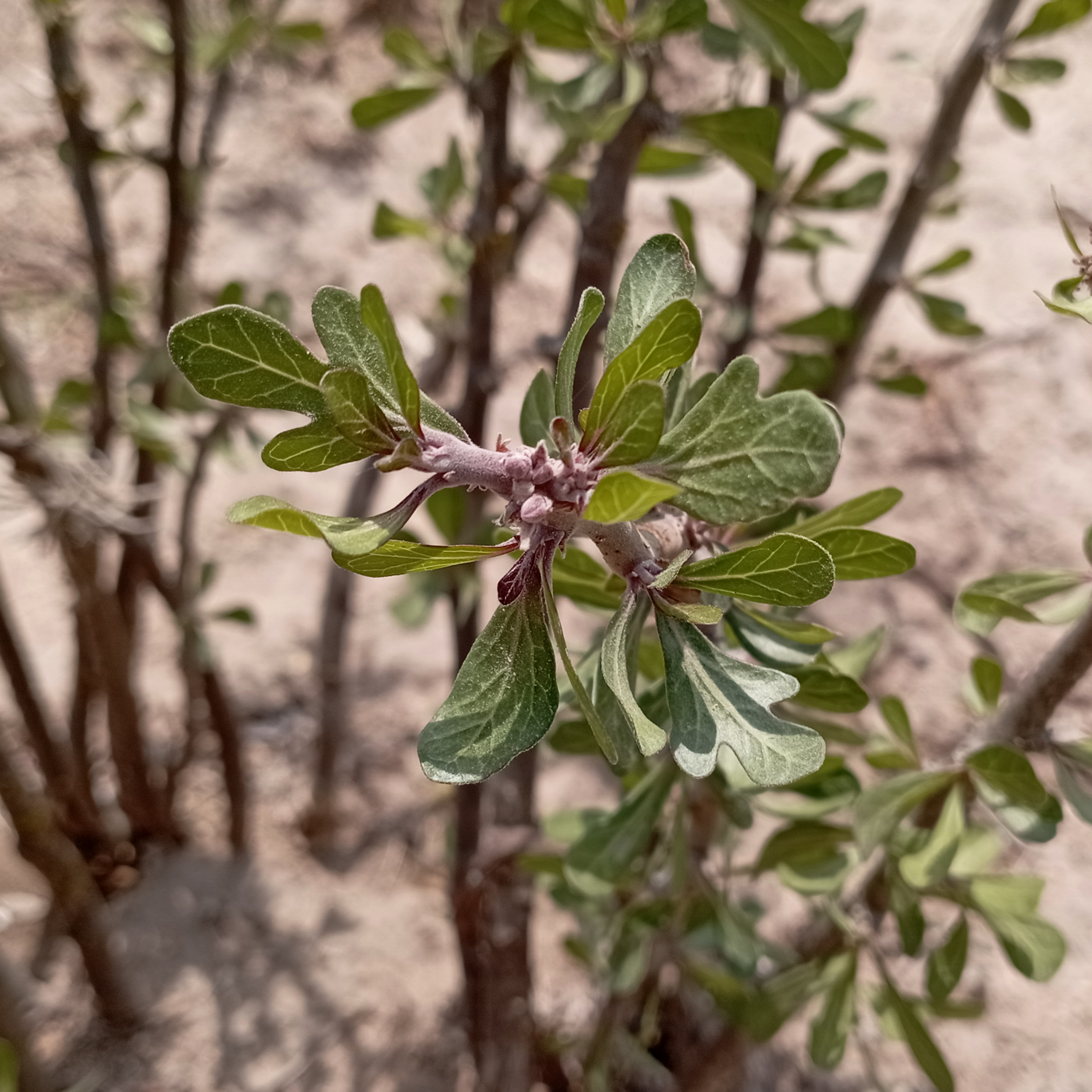

Conservation status
- Least Concern (IUCN 3.1)

Scientific classification
- Kingdom: Plantae
- Clade: Tracheophytes
- Clade: Angiosperms
- Clade: Eudicots
- Clade: Rosids
- Order: Malpighiales
- Family: Euphorbiaceae
- Genus: Jatropha
- Species: J. dioica

Binomial name
- Jatropha dioica Sessé

Varieties
- J. d. var. dioica J. d. var. graminea McVaugh

Synonyms
- Jatropha spathulata (Ortega) Müll.Arg. Mozinna spathulata Ortega

= Jatropha dioica =

Species of succulent

Jatropha dioica is a species of flowering plant in the spurge family, Euphorbiaceae, that is native to an area from Texas in the United States to as far south as Oaxaca in Mexico. Common names include leatherstem and sangre de drago. The specific name refers to the dioecious nature of the plants.

== Description ==
Jatropha dioica forms colonies from subterranean rhizomes. The arching, succulent stems reach a height of 20–60 cm and have few branches. They are tough and sufficiently flexible to be tied into overhand knots without breaking. The orange rootstock spreads to a length of around 1 m. Leaves are arranged simply, alternately, or fascicularly and are clustered on short shoots extending from the stems. They are subsessile and have entire margins. The leaves of the nominate variety are linear and measure up to 6 × 1 cm, whereas the leaves of J. dioica var. graminea may be 2 to 3-lobed and measure up to 6.5 × 0.5 cm. Male inflorescences are clustered cymes. Their flowers possess 3.5 mm sepals, 5 mm petals, and 10 stamens. Female flowers are urceolate with 5 mm petals that are recurved at the tips. Blooming takes place during the spring and early summer. The fruit is a 5 × 12 mm capsule divided into 1 to 2 cells. Seeds are subglobose and measure 1 × 1 cm.

== Phytochemistry ==
Latex is produced by a non-articulated laticifer network composed of 5 to 7 cells. It changes from clear-yellow to blood red as it is exposed to air, hence its Spanish name sangre de drago, "dragon's blood". The roots contain riolozatrione (C_{20}H_{26}O_{3}), a diterpene with antimicrobial properties. Sheep and goats experience severe gastroenteritis, vomiting, and abdominal pain upon consumption of the plant. Leatherstem is able to safely absorb a relatively high amount of zinc (6249 mg/kg).

== Habitat and range ==
The nominate variety occurs in southern and western Texas, Tamaulipas, Nuevo León, and from Durango to Oaxaca. J. dioica var. graminea is found from Chihuahua to Zacatecas as well in the Trans-Pecos of Texas. Its type specimen was collected in Jimulco, Coahuila.

== Uses ==
Jatropha dioica is traditionally used in the treatment of dental issues such as gingivitis, loose teeth, bleeding gums, and toothache. The latex is an astringent and may also be used as a red dye. Leatherstem is sometimes cultivated as an ornamental in xeriscapes or rock gardens.

== Ecology ==
Sangre de drago acts as a nurse plant for small cacti such as Lophophora species. The seeds are eaten by white-winged doves (Zenaida asiatica).

== Gallery ==
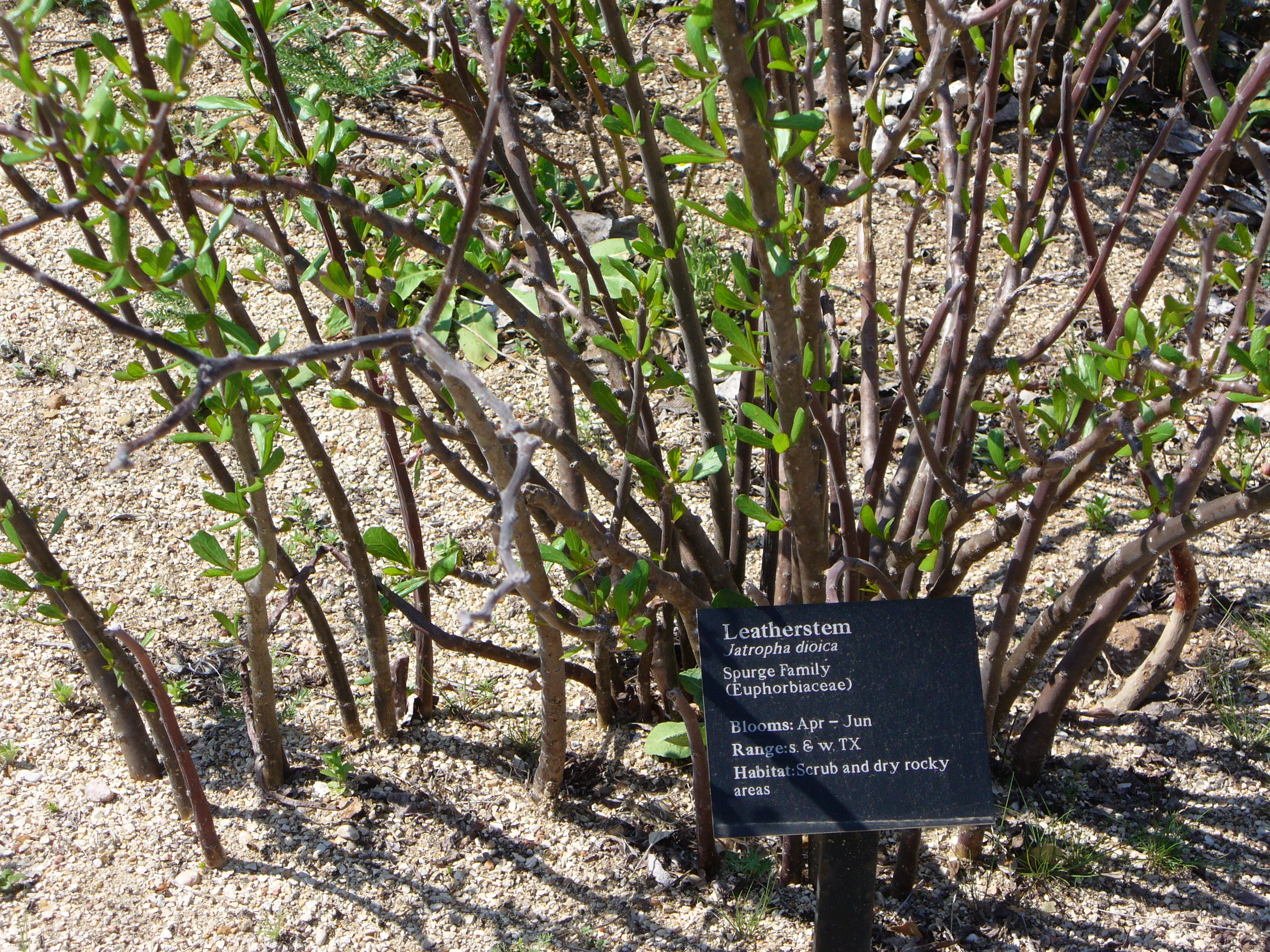

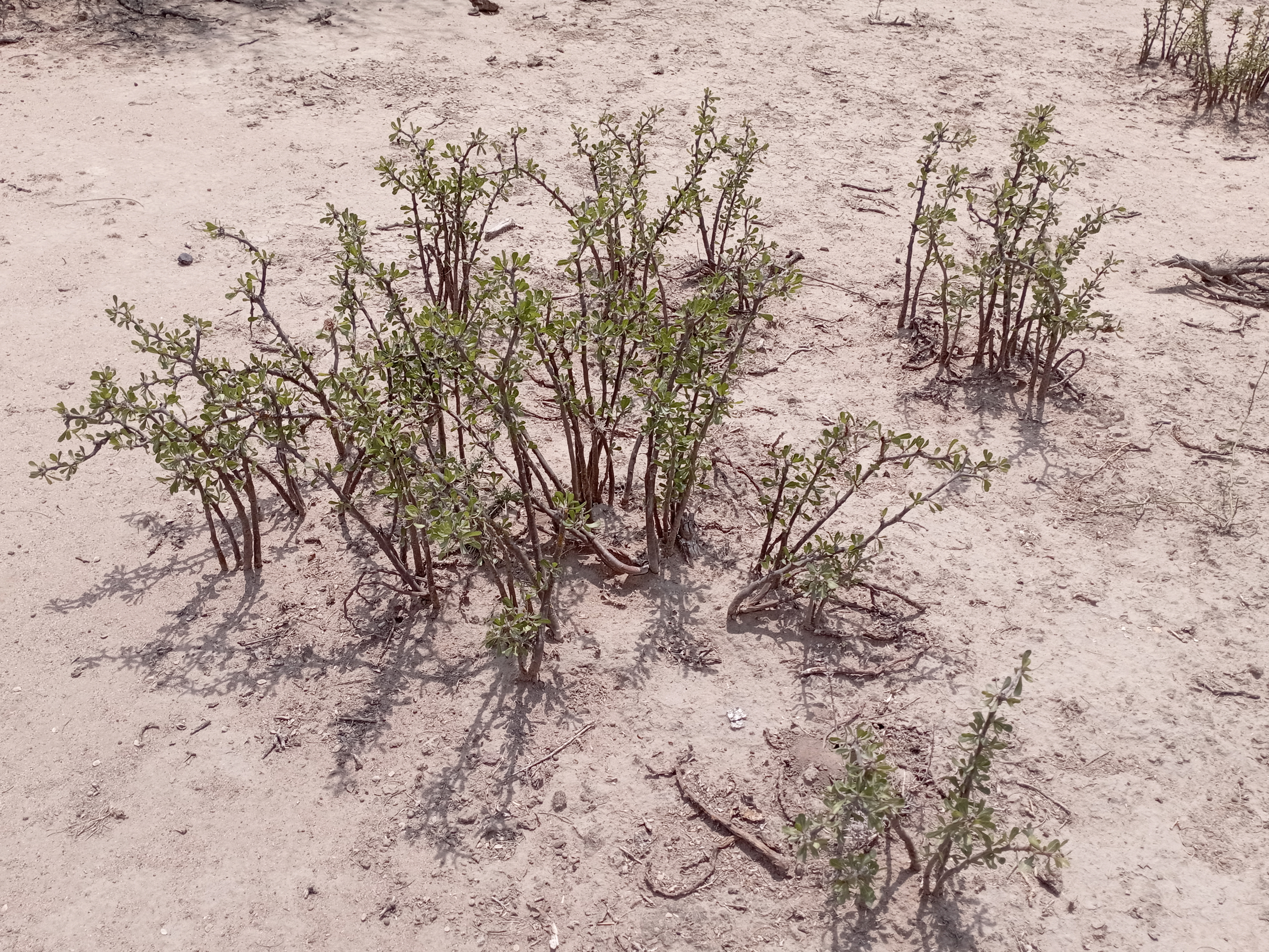

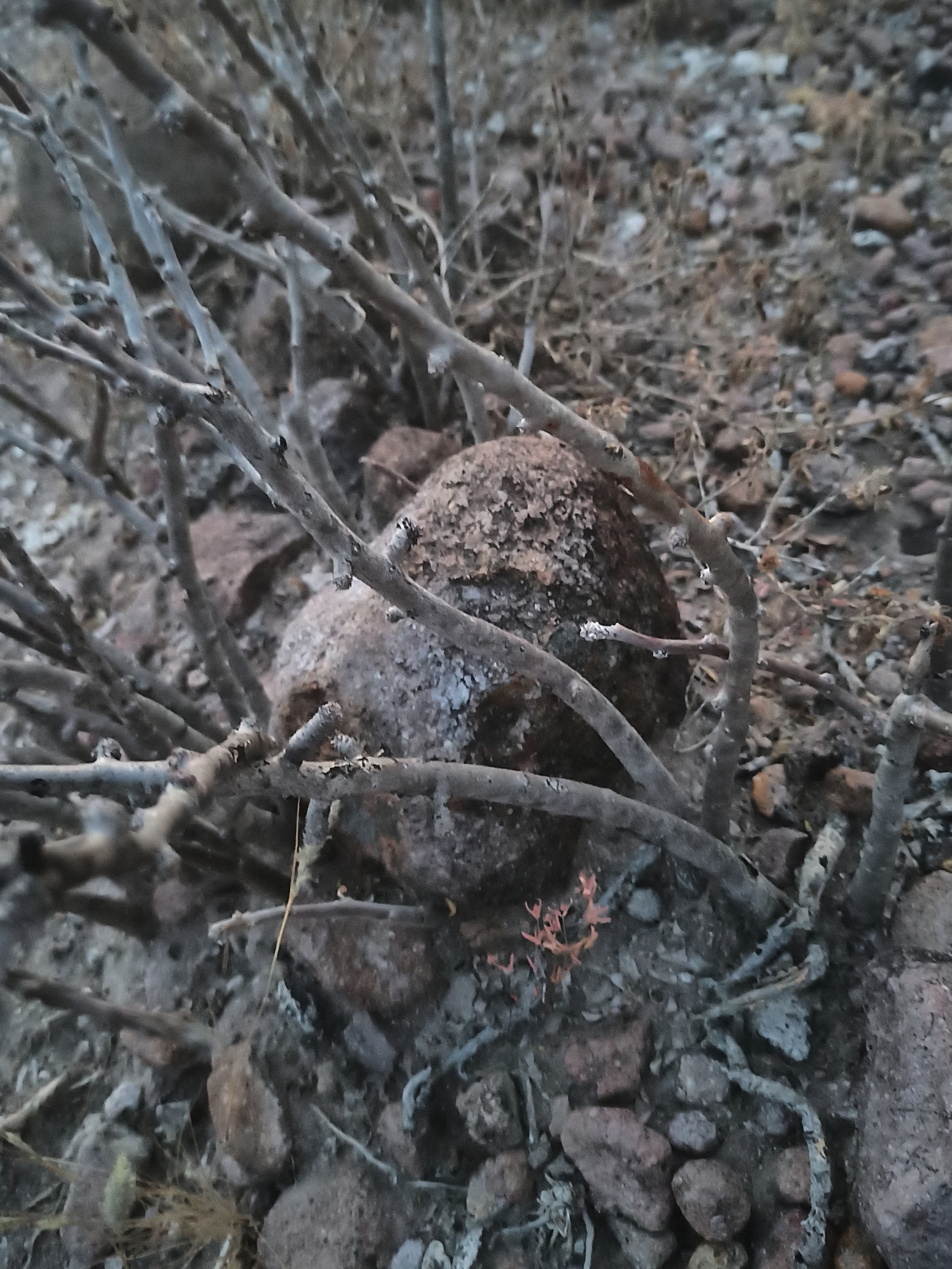

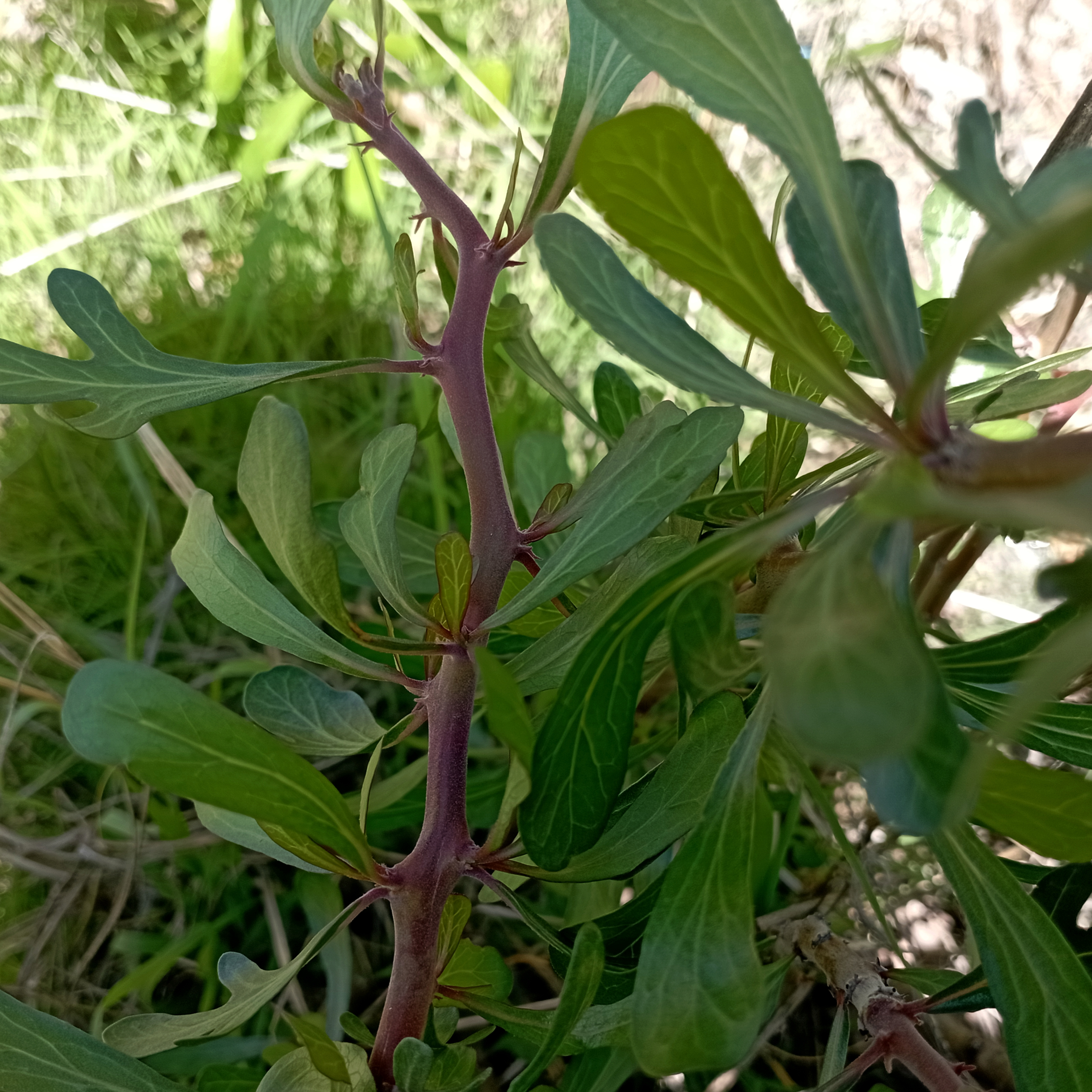

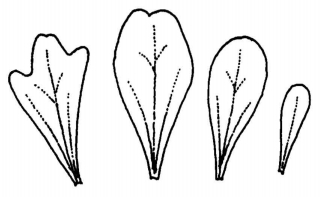
