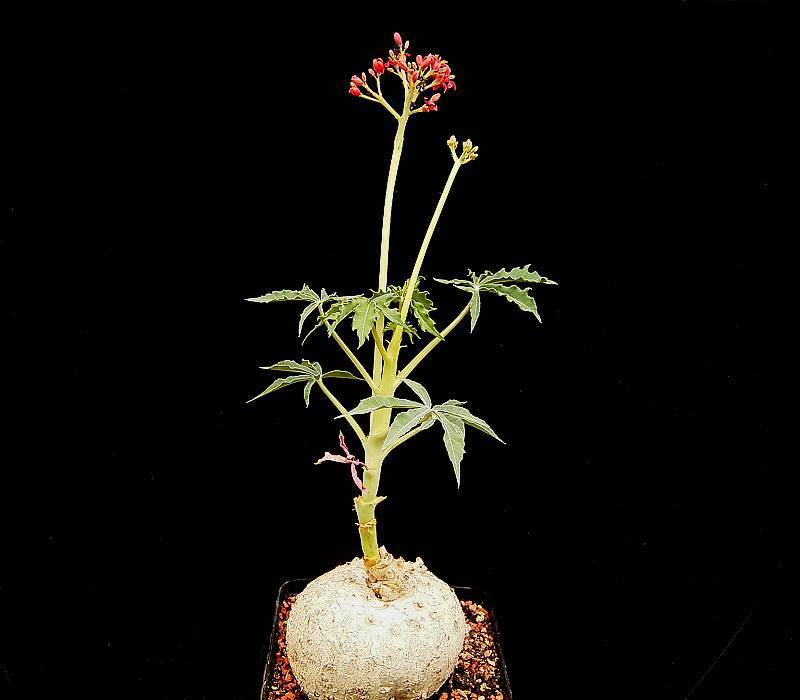

Scientific classification
- Kingdom: Plantae
- Clade: Tracheophytes
- Clade: Angiosperms
- Clade: Eudicots
- Clade: Rosids
- Order: Malpighiales
- Family: Euphorbiaceae
- Genus: Jatropha
- Species: J. cathartica

Binomial name
- Jatropha cathartica Terán & Berland.

Synonyms
- Adenoropium berlandieri (Torrey) Small; Jatropha berlandieri Torrey

= Jatropha cathartica =

Species of flowering plant

Jatropha cathartica is a species of flowering plant in the spurge family, Euphorbiaceae, that is native to Texas in the United States and Coahuila, Nuevo León and Tamaulipas in northeastern Mexico. Common names include jicamilla (Spanish) and Berlandier's nettlespurge.

== Description ==
Jatropha cathartica is a perennial herb that grows from an enlarged, tuberlike woody root (caudex). It is deciduous, losing both stems and leaves, and spends the winter in a dormant state.

=== Caudex ===
The large caudex is globose, pastel-white, and up to 20 cm (7.9 in) wide and 30 cm (12 in) tall (or more). It is underground in the wild but becomes exposed if cultivated in a container.

=== Stems ===
Stems reach a length of 30 cm and have petioles up to 17 centimetres (6.7 in) long.

=== Leaves ===
Leaves are gray-green, palmate, very deeply lobed five to seven times, and up to 10 cm long.

=== Flowers ===
The flowers are showy, bright pink to poppy-red, and arrayed in loose clusters at the ends of long peduncles. Each inflorescence bears individual flowers up to 12 mm wide, of which 3–4 are female and 10–12 are male. It blooms throughout the growing season from February to November, but mainly in summer.

=== Fruit ===
The fruit is a green, pea-like three-lobed capsule containing three seeds.

== Habitat ==
Berlandier's nettlespurge grows scattered among brush, usually on clay soil in hot, arid regions. This plant has adapted to drought and can survive many days without rain. It will grow in sun or shade, but will rot in a cold, damp environment.
