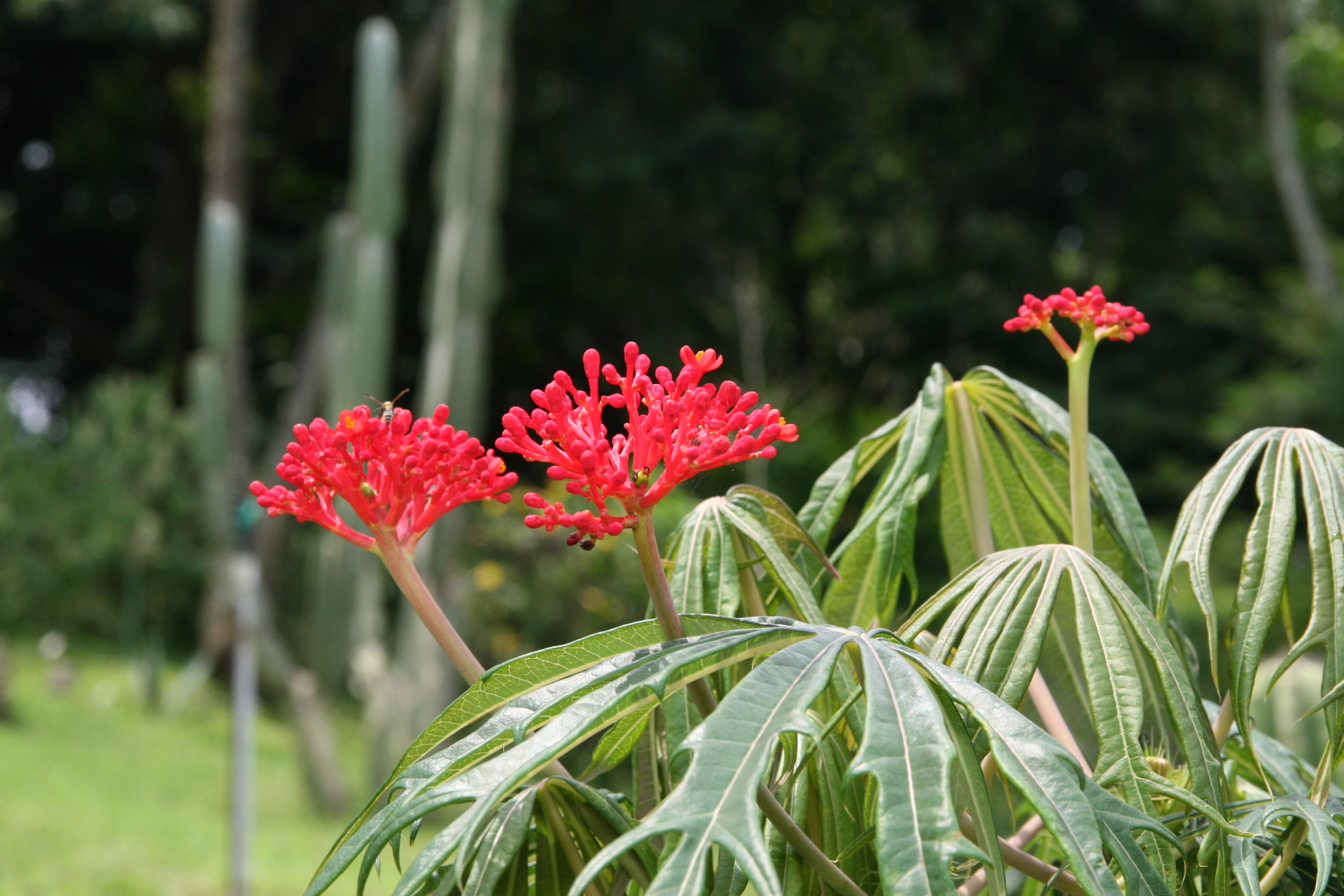
- In a garden setting

Conservation status
- Least Concern (IUCN 3.1)

Scientific classification
- Kingdom: Plantae
- Clade: Embryophytes
- Clade: Tracheophytes
- Clade: Angiosperms
- Clade: Eudicots
- Clade: Rosids
- Order: Malpighiales
- Family: Euphorbiaceae
- Genus: Jatropha
- Species: J. multifida

Binomial name
- Jatropha multifida L.

Synonyms
- List: Adenoropium multifidum (L.) Pohl; Jatropha janipha Blanco; Manihot multifida (L.) Crantz

= Jatropha multifida =

Species of flowering plant

Jatropha multifida, called coral plant, coralbush, and physic nut (a name it shares with other members of its genus), is a species of Jatropha native to Mexico and the Caribbean. A garden plant, it has been introduced to Florida, and to many places in South America, Africa, the Indian subcontinent, China and Southeast Asia. Mildly toxic, consumption causes gastrointestinal distress.
