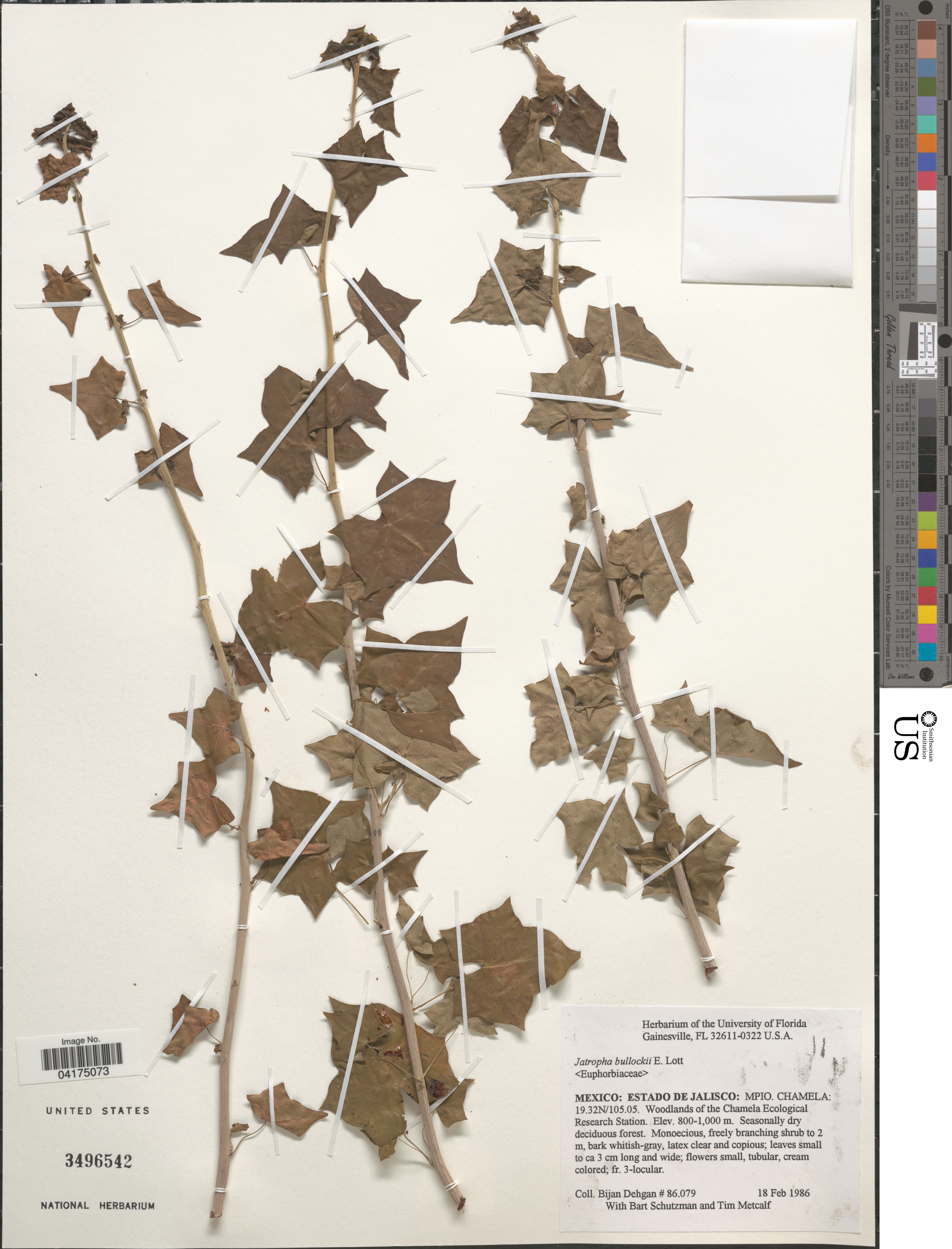

Conservation status
- Endangered (IUCN 3.1)

Scientific classification
- Kingdom: Plantae
- Clade: Tracheophytes
- Clade: Angiosperms
- Clade: Eudicots
- Clade: Rosids
- Order: Malpighiales
- Family: Euphorbiaceae
- Genus: Jatropha
- Species: J. bullockii

Binomial name
- Jatropha bullockii E. J. Lott

= Jatropha bullockii =

Species of flowering plant

Jatropha bullockii is a species of plant in the family Euphorbiaceae. It is endemic to Mexico.
