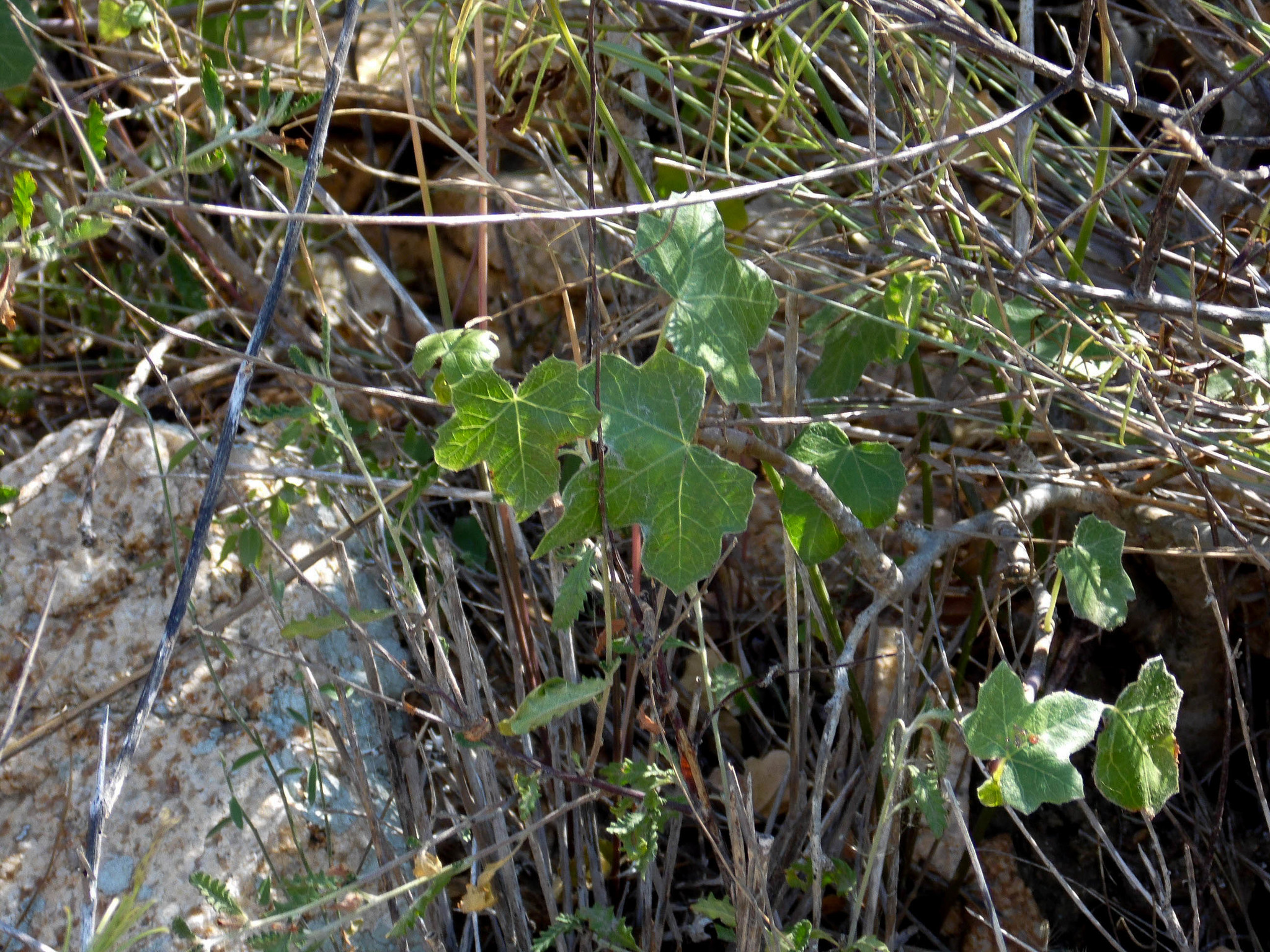

Scientific classification
- Kingdom: Plantae
- Clade: Tracheophytes
- Clade: Angiosperms
- Clade: Eudicots
- Clade: Rosids
- Order: Malpighiales
- Family: Euphorbiaceae
- Genus: Jatropha
- Species: J. moranii

Binomial name
- Jatropha moranii B. Dehgan & G.L. Webster

= Jatropha moranii =

Moran's lomboy

Species of plant

Jatropha moranii is a very rare subshrub in the genus Jatropha known commonly as Moran's lomboy. This species in the family Euphorbiaceae is endemic to a small area of Cabo San Lucas in Baja California Sur. It is characterized by a succulent stem and branches, along with a distinct woody caudex, and attractive white flowers.

== Description ==
This species is a much-branched subshrub that has a distinct woody caudex, fissured bark and attractive white flowers that are produced profusely throughout the year.

=== Morphology ===
This plant grows as a small shrub less than 1 m high, with a succulent stem and branches. The caudex is distinctively woody, and it is covered with fissured, but not peeling, bark. The bark is colored brown with white epidermal markings. The leaves grow on petioles 5 to 18 mm long, and the total length of the leaves with the petioles is around 2.5 to 5.5 cm long. Stipules are not evident. The leaf blade is shaped ovate, and is distinctly 5-lobed. The leaf blade is 1.5 to 3 cm wide. The margins (edges) of the leaves are ciliate, fringed with fine hairs.

The inflorescence is monoecious. The lower bracts are entire, shaped lanceolate and around 3 to 7 mm long. The staminate flowers are subglobose, 8 to 12 mm long and 6 to 9 mm wide, with 10 stamens. The pistillate flowers are campanulate, around 10 to 14 mm long and 12 to 18 mm wide. Both sets of flowers are characterized by white, recurved petals. The capsules of the plant are trilobed, and are around 1.5 to 2 mm long and wide, with grayish brown seeds that are more or less spherical.

== Taxonomy ==
This species was first collected in 1932 by John Thomas Howell, in Cabo San Lucas. It was described in 1978 as Jatropha moranii by Bijan Dehgan and Grady L. Webster, named after the field botanist, Crassulaceae expert and curator of botany at the San Diego Natural History Museum, Reid Moran. It is commonly known as Moran's lomboy.

This species resembles Jatropha purpurea in growth habit and in the structure of the inflorescence. However, J. moranii can be distinguished in its lack of stipules, stout petioles, bracts without glands, and white, recurved petals. J. purpurea does not grow in Baja California Sur, and references to it may be referring to J. moranii.

== Distribution ==
This species is endemic to Baja California Sur and only occurs in a small area at Cabo San Lucas.
