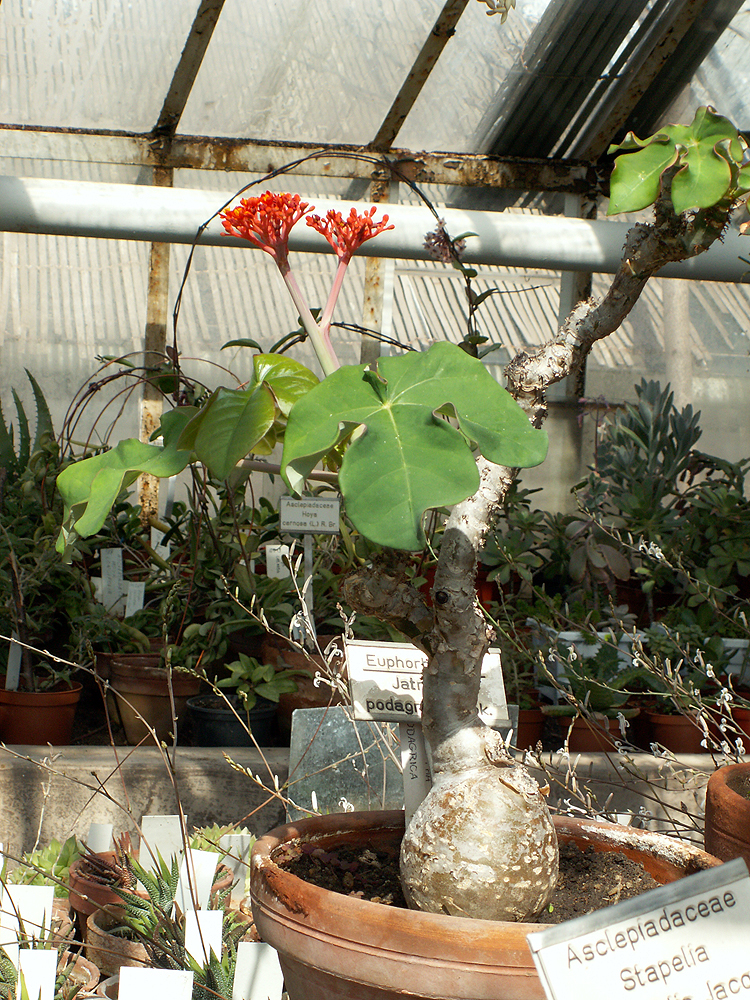

Scientific classification
- Kingdom: Plantae
- Clade: Embryophytes
- Clade: Tracheophytes
- Clade: Angiosperms
- Clade: Eudicots
- Clade: Rosids
- Order: Malpighiales
- Family: Euphorbiaceae
- Genus: Jatropha
- Species: J. podagrica

Binomial name
- Jatropha podagrica Hook.

= Jatropha podagrica =

Species of flowering plant

Jatropha podagrica is a species of flowering, caudiciform succulent plant in the spurge family, Euphorbiaceae, aligning it closely with related genera such as Croton, Euphorbia and Ricinus (castor bean), among others. It is native to the neotropics of Central America and southern Mexico, but is grown as an ornamental plant in many parts of the world due to its unusual appearance and mature caudex development. Common names for the species include gout-plant, gout-stalk, Guatemalan rhubarb, coral-plant, Buddha-belly plant, purging-nut, physic-nut, goutystalk nettlespurge, Australian bottleplant (a geographical misnomer) and tartogo.

== Description ==
J. podagrica is a caudiciform perennial herb growing up to 1 metre (3 feet) tall. The grey-green, knobby, swollen caudex has a bottle-like appearance, giving rise to some of the common names. Leaves are held on long fleshy yet stout petioles which emerge from the tip of the stem and radiate in all directions. Leaves are peltate and 3 or 5 lobed. Dense clusters of small, orange-red, flowers are held above the leaves on long slim peduncles. The clusters carry both male and female flowers and flowering continues for most of the year. Fruit are green capsules at first, becoming blackish-brown at maturity when they burst and scatter the seeds up to 4 metres (13 feet) away.

When cut, the plant exudes a copious sticky sap which may cause dermatitis on contact.

== Cultivation ==
The swollen caudex, showy leaves, and colourful flowers make J. podagrica an attractive ornamental, and it is grown as an indoor plant in many parts of the world.

== Uses ==
There are many traditional uses of J. podagrica in folk medicine, with a number of significant research initiatives being undertaken into the species' potential health benefits. Several projects have sought to identify medicinally-useful compounds contained within J. podagrica, with potential applications as an analgesic, aphrodisiac, antimicrobial/disinfectant, antivenin, gout treatment, intestinal parasite purge, laxative and tonic, amongst other possibilities.

Industrial and practical uses include the plant's potential as a form of biofuel, dye, pest control, plant fertiliser, soap, and as a natural form of lighting or lamp oil (typically kerosene), as well as for leather and tanning.

== Toxicity ==
All parts of the plant are considered toxic, in particular the seeds. The main toxins are a purgative oil and a phytotoxin or toxalbumin (curcin) similar to ricin in Ricinis.

== Gallery ==
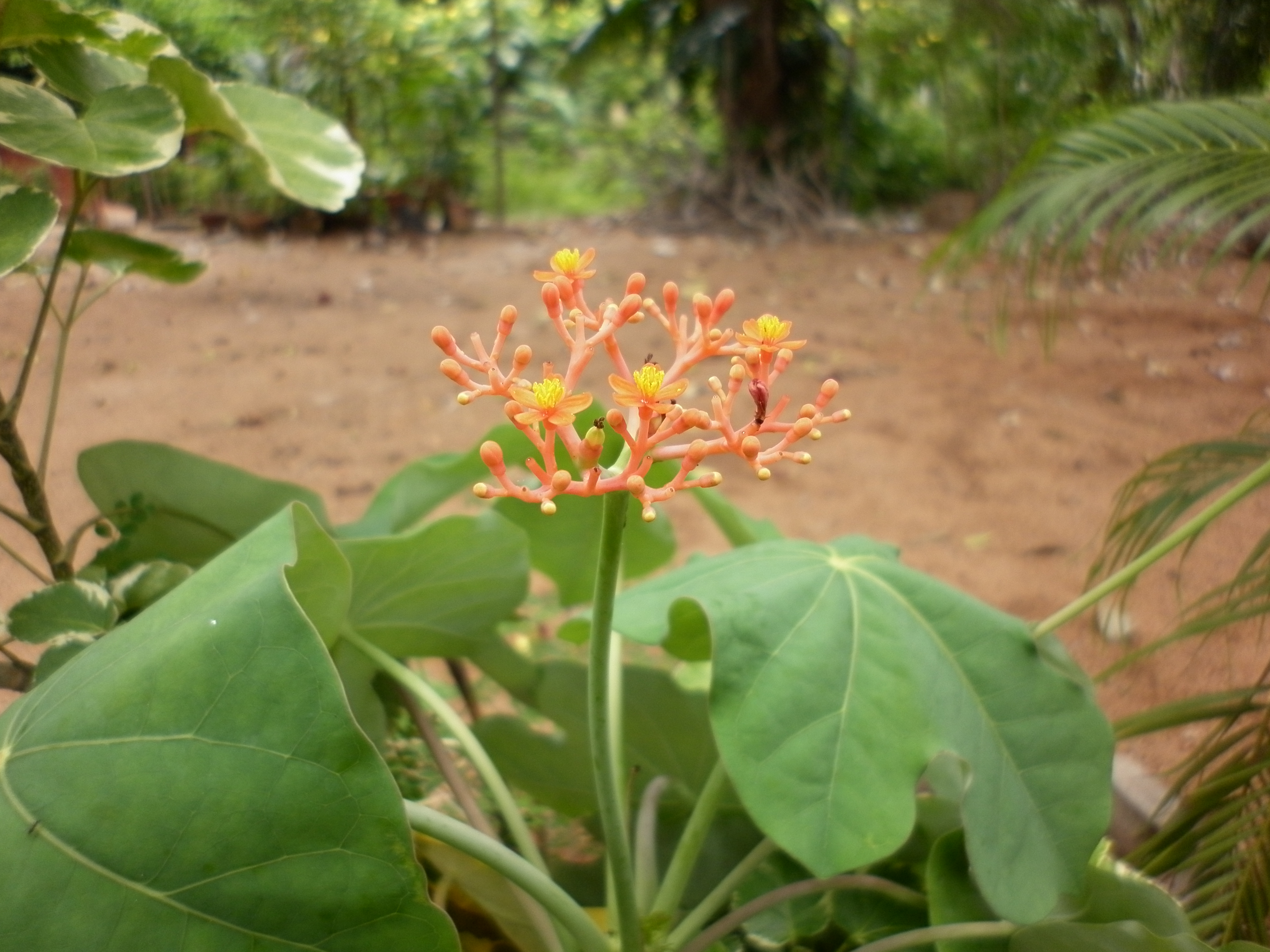
Buddha-belly plant; Pondicherry, Puducherry, India

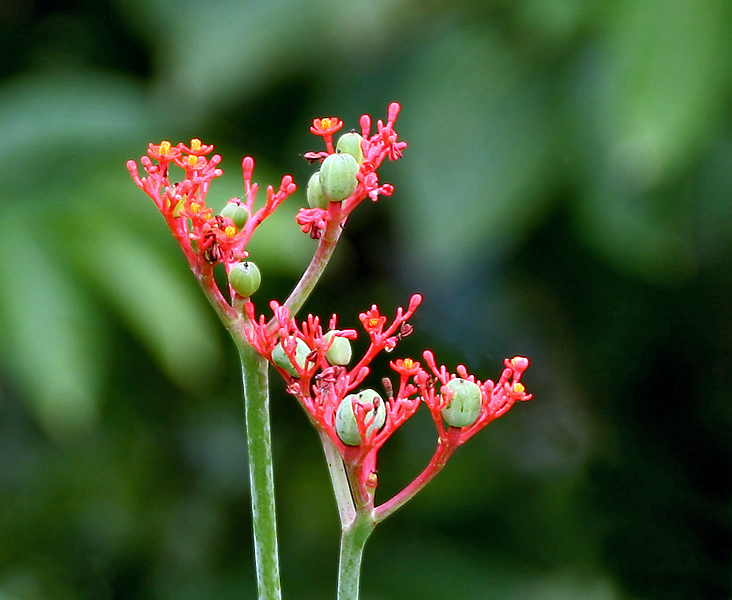
Flowering bracts of J. podagrica

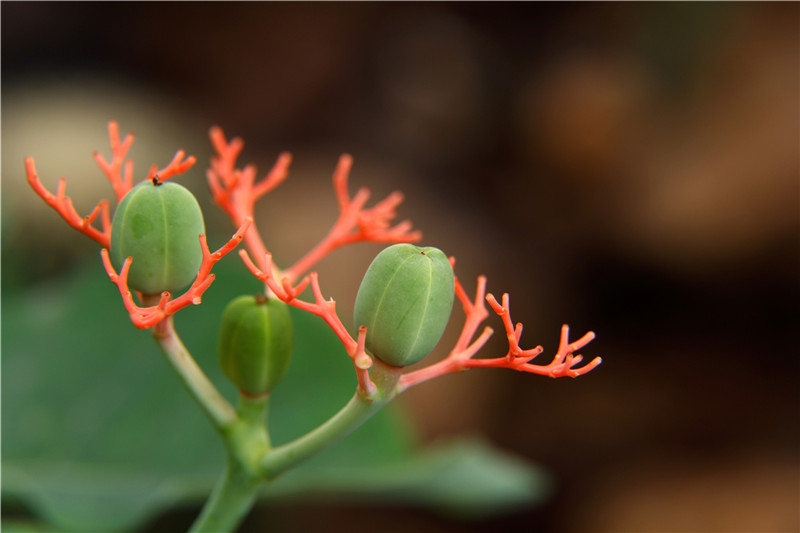
Fruit-setting of J. podagrica.

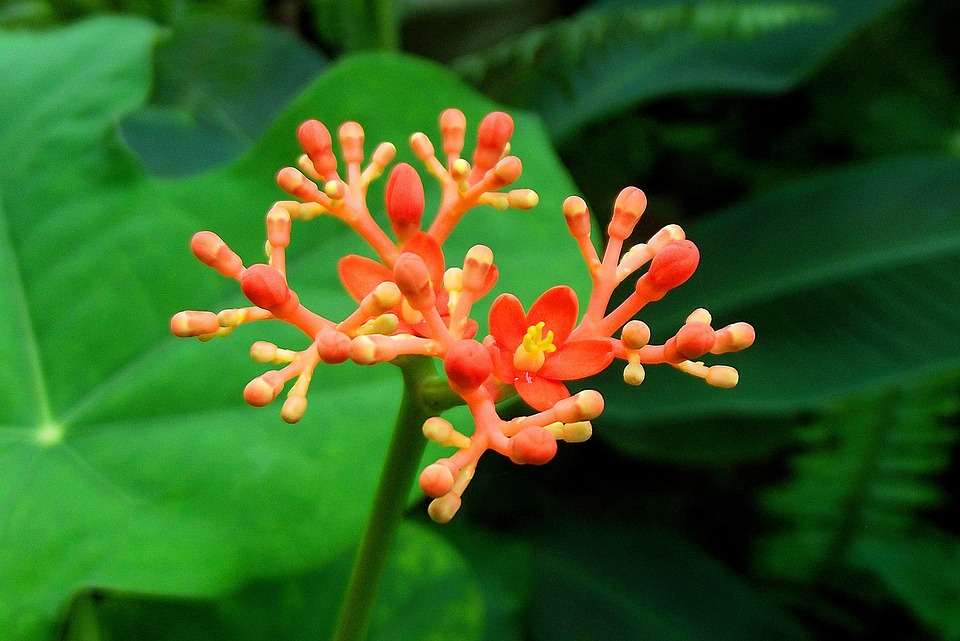
Bracts and blooms of J. podagrica

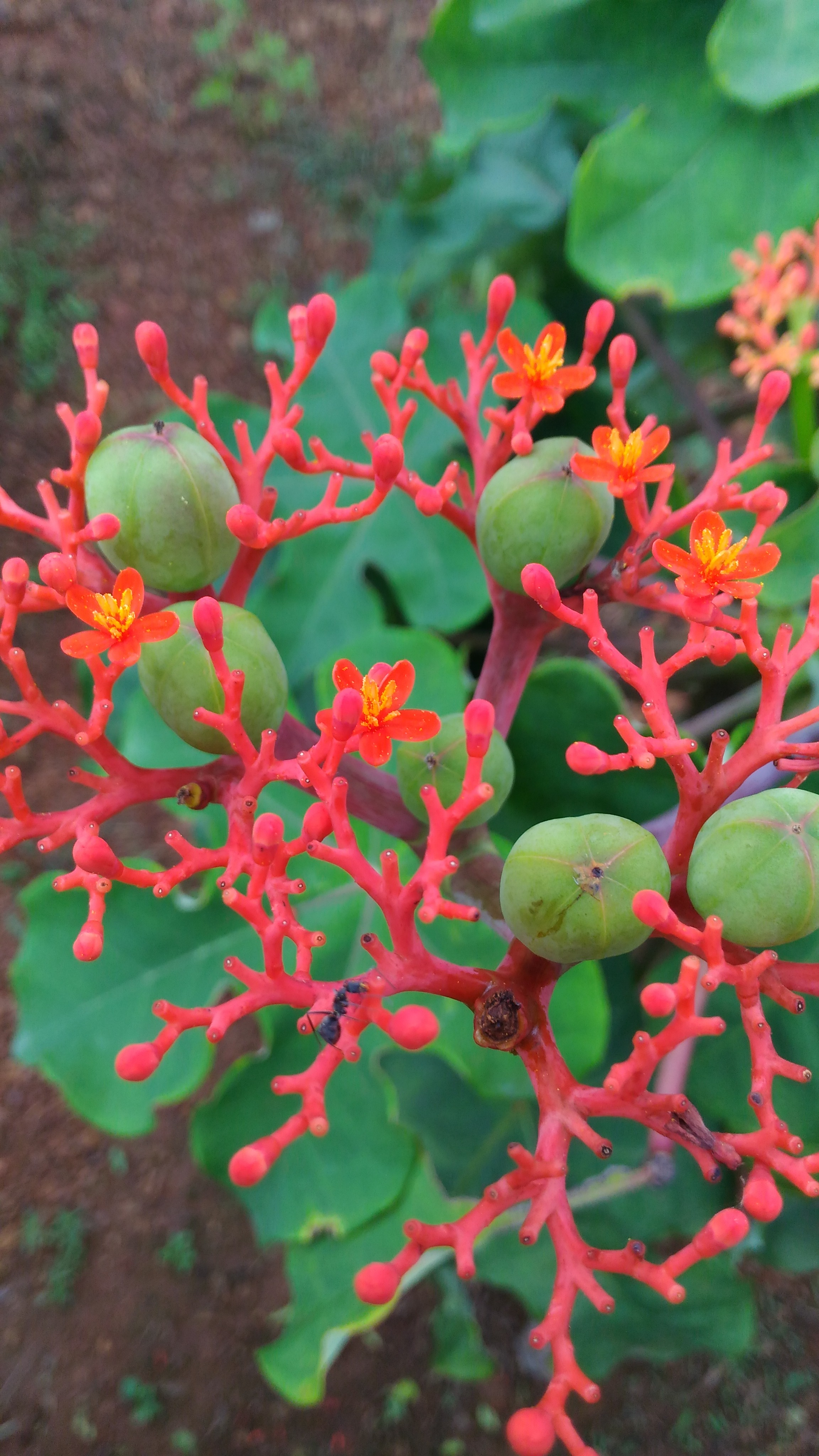
J. podagrica fruit development, post-pollination

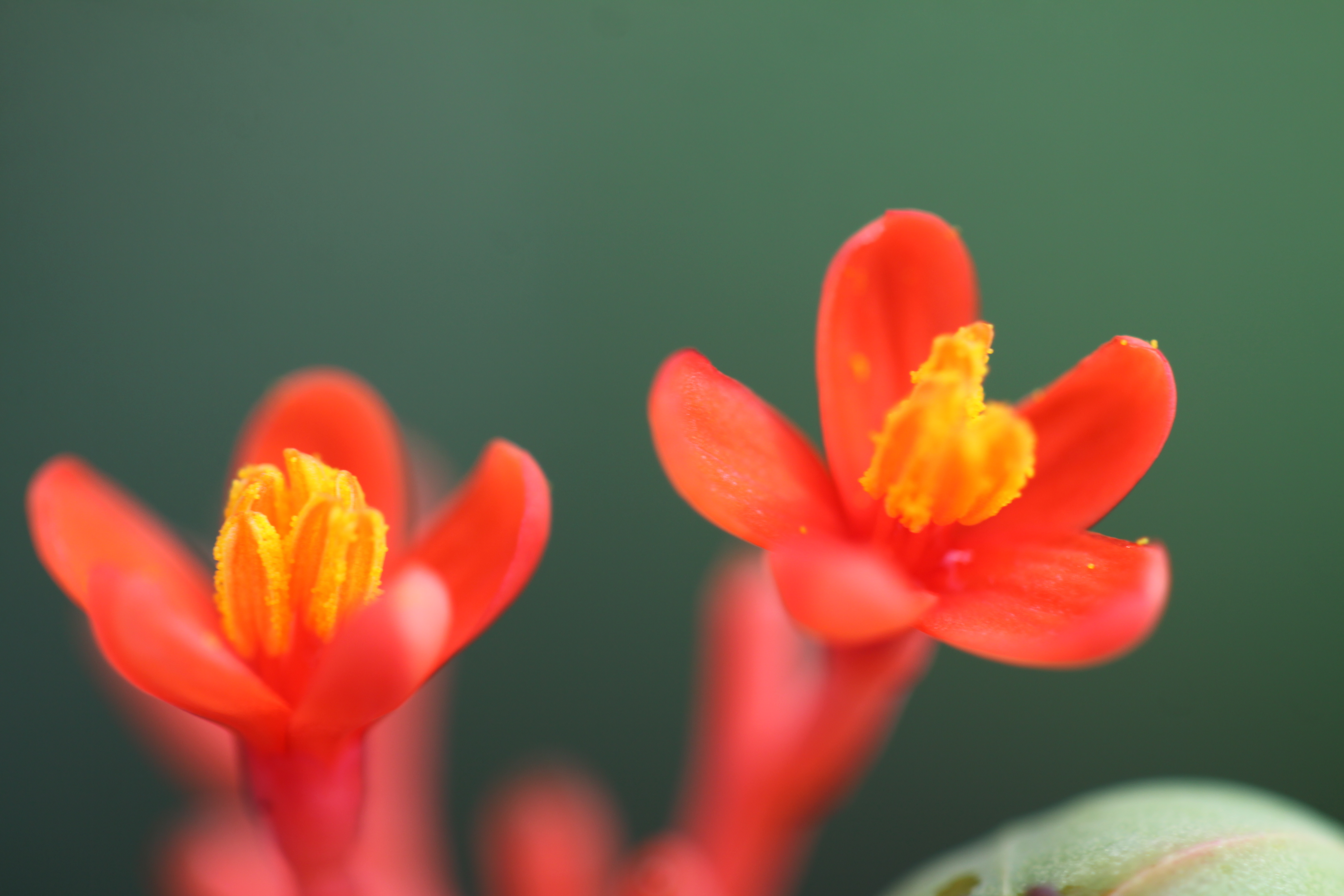
J. podagrica, blooming
