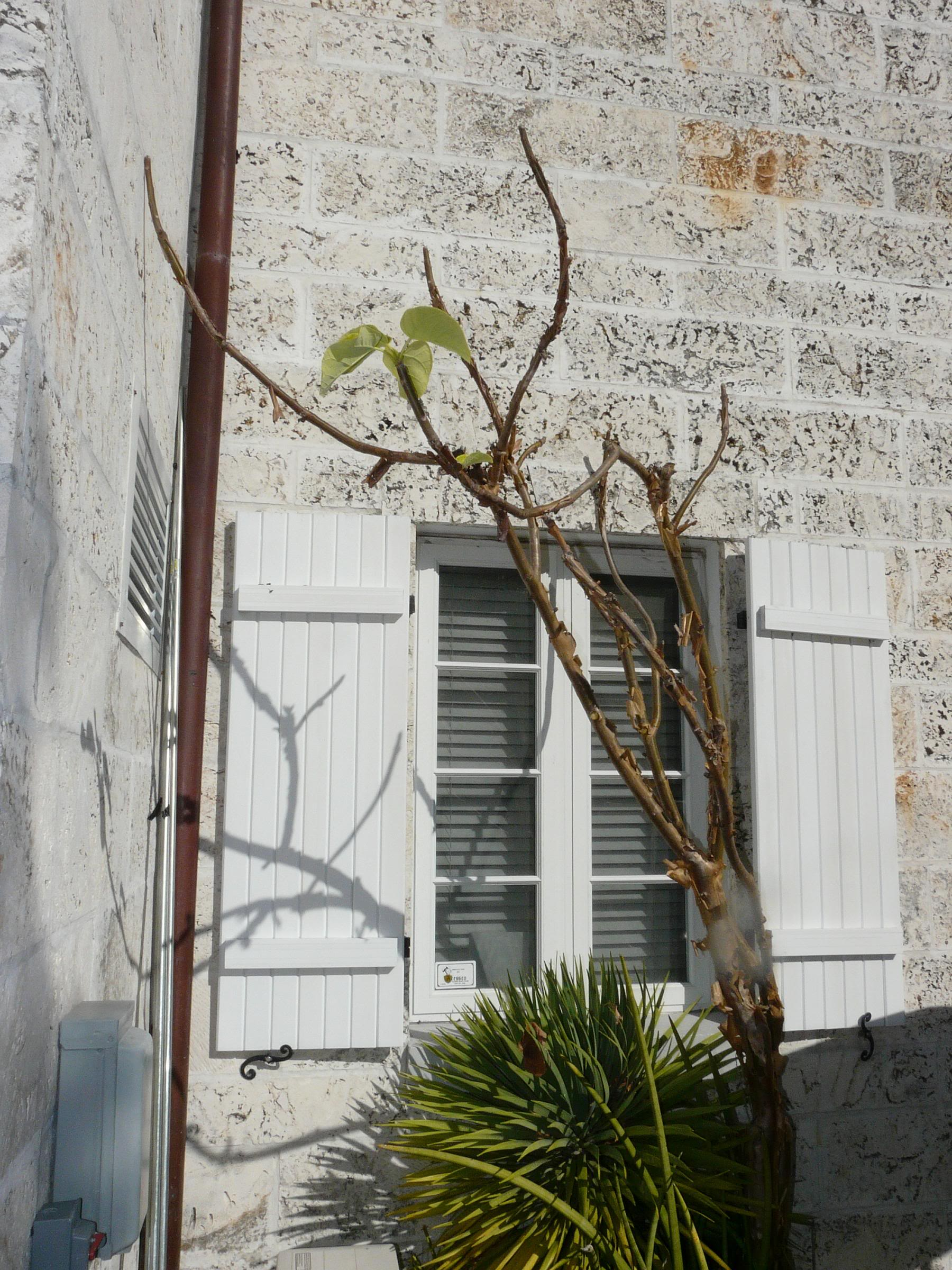

Conservation status
- Endangered (IUCN 3.1)

Scientific classification
- Kingdom: Plantae
- Clade: Tracheophytes
- Clade: Angiosperms
- Clade: Eudicots
- Clade: Rosids
- Order: Malpighiales
- Family: Euphorbiaceae
- Genus: Jatropha
- Species: J. chamelensis

Binomial name
- Jatropha chamelensis Pérez-Jiménez

= Jatropha chamelensis =

Species of flowering plant

Jatropha chamelensis is a species of plant in the family Euphorbiaceae. It is endemic to Mexico, but restricted to a small region on the Pacific coast, including the Reserva de la Biosfera Chamela-Cuixmala in Jalisco and the tropical deciduous forest of Nayarit.
