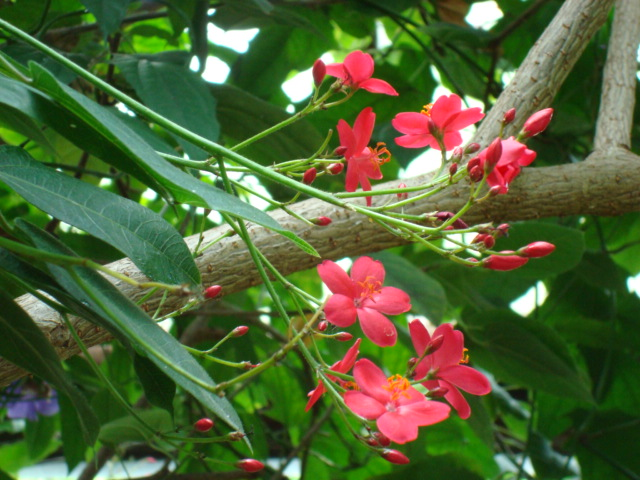

Scientific classification
- Kingdom: Plantae
- Clade: Tracheophytes
- Clade: Angiosperms
- Clade: Eudicots
- Clade: Rosids
- Order: Malpighiales
- Family: Euphorbiaceae
- Genus: Jatropha
- Species: J. integerrima

Binomial name
- Jatropha integerrima Jacq.

Synonyms
- Jatropha hastata Jacq.; Adenoropium hastatum Britton & P.Wilson; Adenoropium integerrimum (Jacq.) Pohl; Adenoropium pandurifolium (Andrews) Pohl; Jatropha acuminata Desr.; Jatropha coccinea Hort.Cels ex Link; Jatropha diversifolia A.Rich.; Jatropha diversifolia var. pandurifolia M.Gómez; Jatropha hastata Jacq.; Jatropha integerrima var. coccinea (Link) N.P.Balakr.; Jatropha integerrima var. hastata (Jacq.) Fosberg; Jatropha integerrima var. latifolia (Pax) N.P.Balakr.; Jatropha moluensis Sessé & Moc.; Jatropha pandurifolia Andrews; Jatropha pandurifolia var. coccinea Pax; Jatropha pandurifolia var. latifolia Pax

= Jatropha integerrima =

Species of flowering plant

Jatropha integerrima, commonly known as peregrina or spicy jatropha, is a species of flowering plant in the spurge family, Euphorbiaceae, that is native to Cuba and Hispaniola.

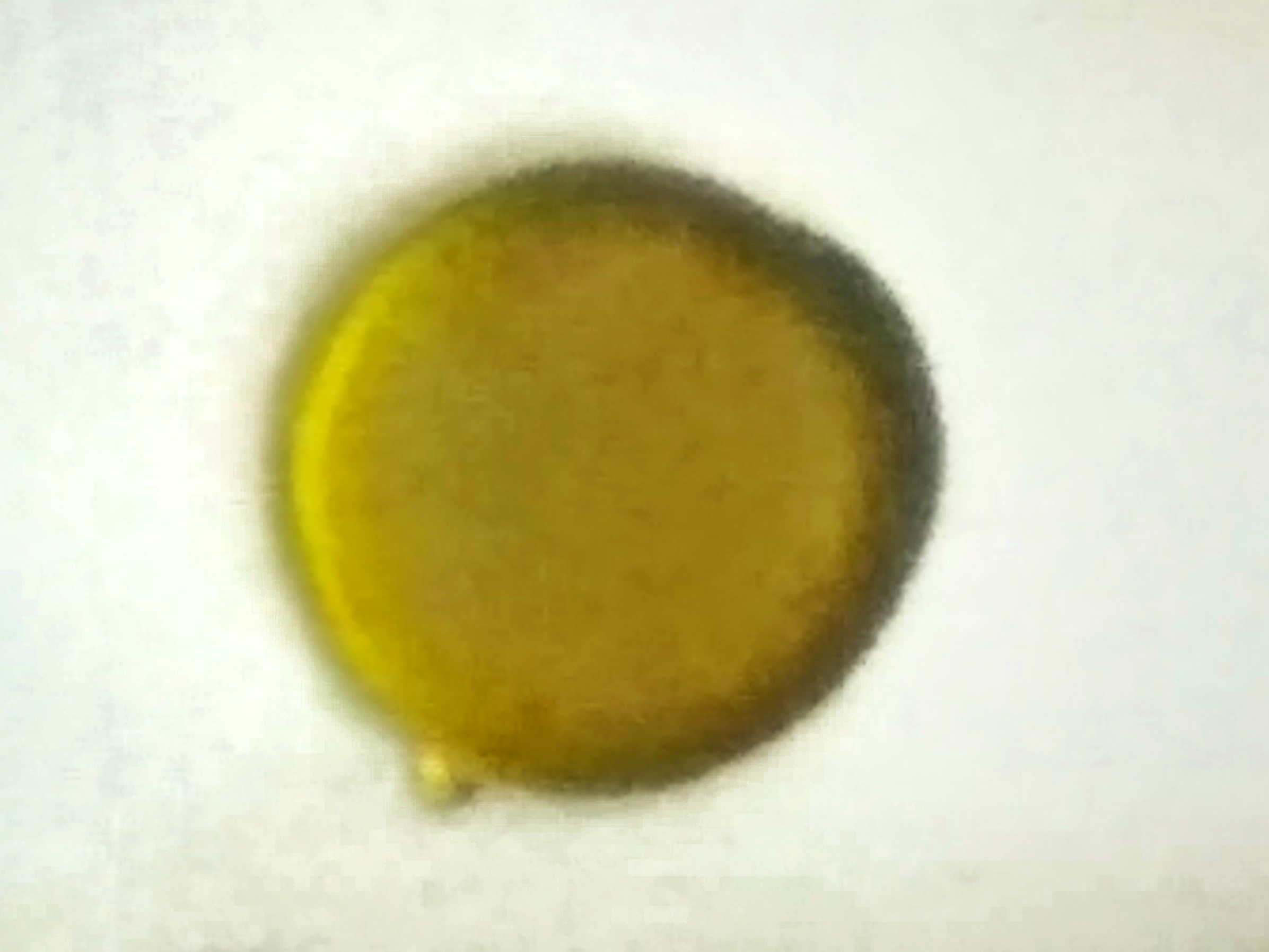
Pollen of Jatropha integerrima

It is a shrub or small tree with a swollen caudex or trunk. The leaves are three-lobed, with the middle lobe by far the largest. There are separate male and female flowers. The ten stamens of the male flowers are fused into two concentric columns, the outer only half as tall as the inner.
