= Blazing star (disambiguation) =

Blazing star may refer to:

- Blazing Star, a 1998 video game for the Neo Geo system
- Blazing Star, a lesbian group that was part of the Chicago Women's Liberation Union
- Blazing Star, the newsletter produced by the lesbian group that was part of the Chicago Women's Liberation Union
- The Blazing Star, the journal of the North American Native Plant Society

== Plants ==
- Chamaelirium luteum, native to eastern North America
- Liatris, several species
- Several species of Mentzelia, including:
  - Mentzelia laevicaulis, giant or smooth-stem blazing star, native to western North America
  - Mentzelia lindleyi, native to California
  - Mentzelia pumila, golden blazing star, native to northern Mexico and the western United States
- Tritonia crocata, native to southern Africa and a weed elsewhere

== See also ==
- Primula sect. Dodecatheon, a group of wildflowers called shooting star
