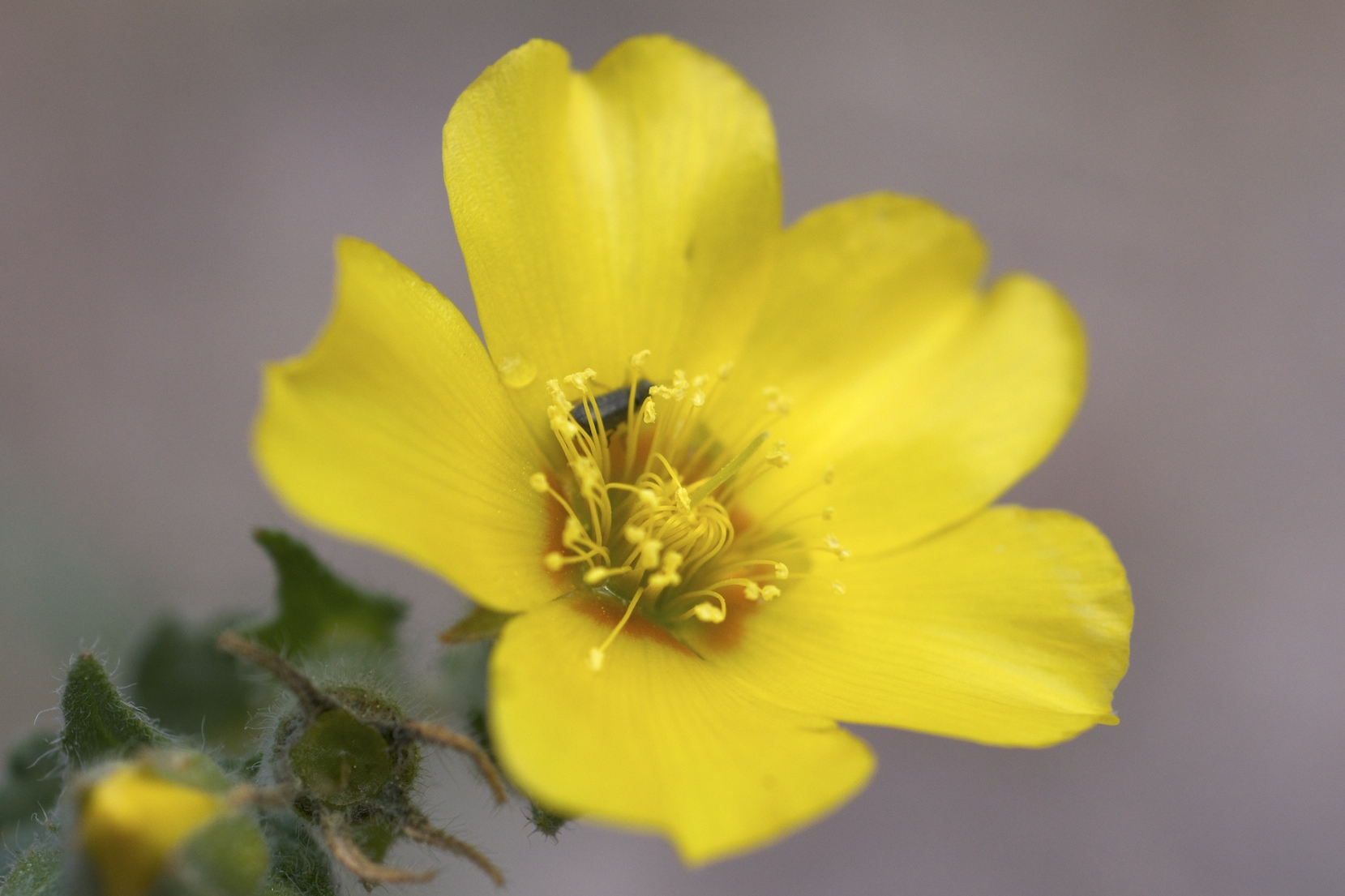

Scientific classification
- Kingdom: Plantae
- Clade: Tracheophytes
- Clade: Angiosperms
- Clade: Eudicots
- Clade: Asterids
- Order: Cornales
- Family: Loasaceae
- Genus: Mentzelia
- Species: M. gracilenta

Binomial name
- Mentzelia gracilenta Torr. & A.Gray

Synonyms
- Mentzelia ravenii

= Mentzelia gracilenta =

Species of flowering plant

Mentzelia gracilenta, known by the common names blazing star, grass blazingstar, and slender blazing star, is a species of flowering plant in the family Loasaceae.

== Distribution ==
The plant is endemic to California, where it is known only from the Southern California Coast Ranges and Western Transverse Ranges of Central and Southern California. Much of its range is within the Los Padres National Forest.

It grows in grasslands, oak woodlands, and rugged mountain habitats including serpentine soils and rocky slopes. The plant is found from 20–1,700 metres (66–5,577 ft) in elevation. It intergrades with Mentzelia ravenii, Mentzelia montana, and Mentzelia veatchiana.

== Description ==
Mentzelia gracilenta is an annual herb producing an erect greenish stem sometimes exceeding 0.5 metres (1.6 ft) in maximum height. The leaves are divided deeply into comblike lobes, the longest in the basal rosette 13 centimeters long and those higher on the stem reduced in size.

The inflorescence is a cluster of flowers each with five shiny yellow petals dotted with red at the bases, measuring roughly one to two centimeters long. The fruit is a narrow, curving utricle containing many tiny, angular seeds.

== See also ==
- California montane chaparral and woodlands
- California oak woodlands
