= Mentzelia affinis =

Conservation status
- Secure (NatureServe)

Scientific classification
- Kingdom: Plantae
- Clade: Embryophytes
- Clade: Tracheophytes
- Clade: Spermatophytes
- Clade: Angiosperms
- Clade: Eudicots
- Clade: Asterids
- Order: Cornales
- Family: Loasaceae
- Genus: Mentzelia
- Species: M. affinis

Binomial name
- Mentzelia affinis Greene

Species of flowering plant

Mentzelia affinis is a species of flowering plants in the family Loasaceae known by the common name yellowcomet. It is native to the southern half of California, Arizona, and adjacent sections of Nevada and Baja California, where it is known from scrub, woodland, desert sands, and other habitat types.

== Description ==
It is an upright, annual herb that grows up to 20 inches (0.51 metres) tall. The leaves are up to 17 centimeters long in the basal rosette, divided into lobes and sometimes toothed, and smaller higher up on the plant.

The flower has five shiny yellow petals, each with an orange spot at the base and often a toothed or notched tip. The fruit is a narrow, curving utricle 1 to 3 centimeters long. It contains many tiny prism-shaped seeds.

== Taxonomy ==
Mentzelia affinis was scientifically described and named by Edward Lee Greene in 1890. It is classified in the genus Mentzelia in the family Loasaceae family. It has no accepted subspecies and one homotypic synonym from when Per Axel Rydberg proposed moving it to the genus Acrolasia in 1903 as Acrolasia affinis, a proposal that was not accepted.
