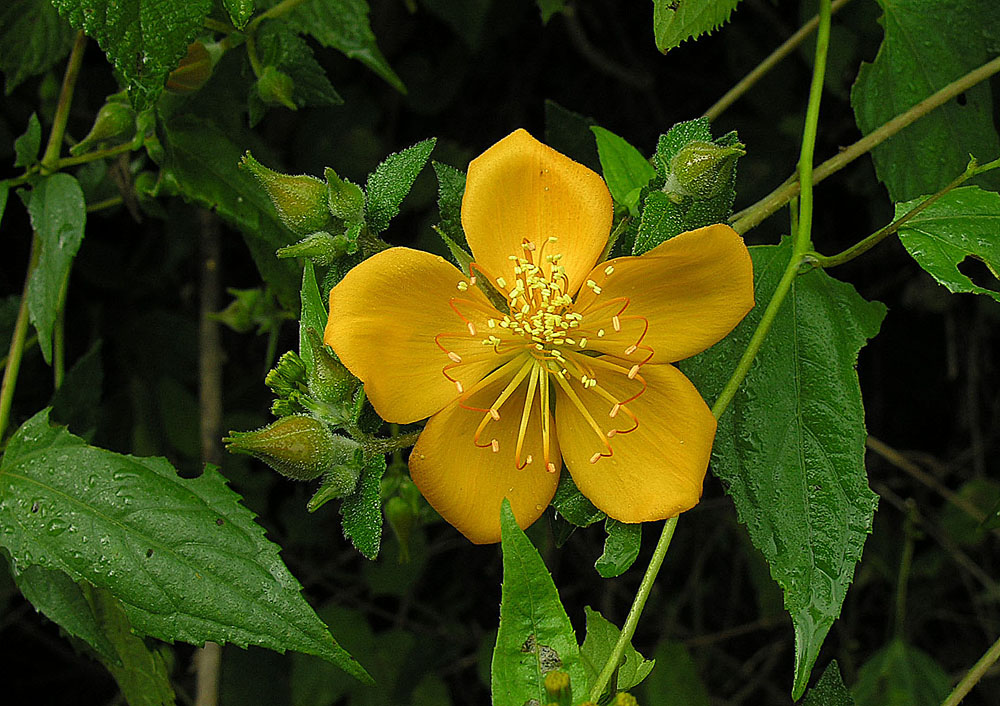

Scientific classification
- Kingdom: Plantae
- Clade: Tracheophytes
- Clade: Angiosperms
- Clade: Eudicots
- Clade: Asterids
- Order: Cornales
- Family: Loasaceae
- Genus: Mentzelia
- Species: M. hispida

Binomial name
- Mentzelia hispida Willd.

= Mentzelia hispida =

Species of flowering plant

Mentzelia hispida is a species of flowering plant in the family Loasaceae known by the common name pega ropa, or "sticks to clothing" in Spanish. It is native to Mexico where it grows in scrub and woodland habitats.
