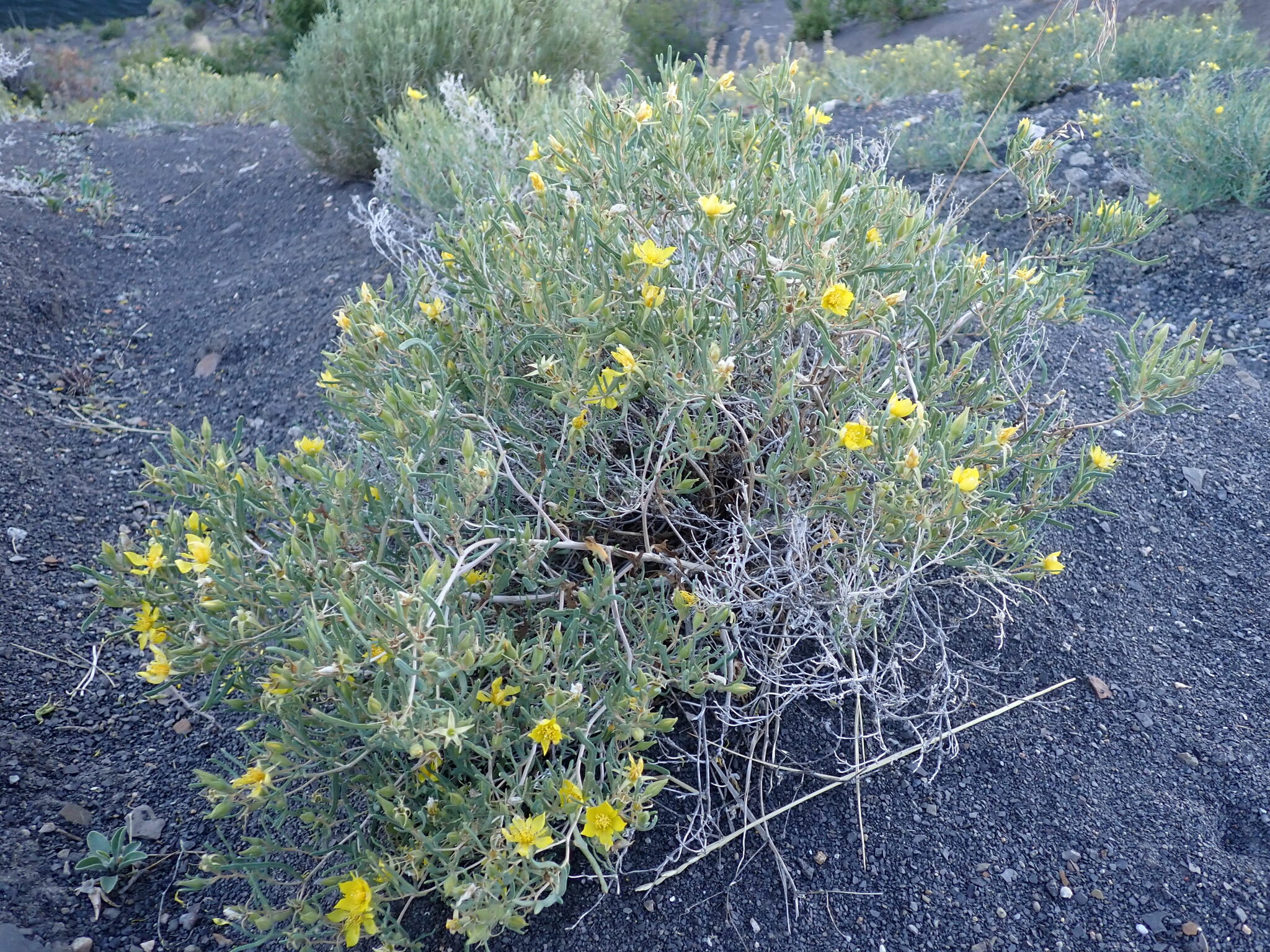
- In Summit County, Colorado

Conservation status
- Vulnerable (NatureServe)

Scientific classification
- Kingdom: Plantae
- Clade: Tracheophytes
- Clade: Angiosperms
- Clade: Eudicots
- Clade: Asterids
- Order: Cornales
- Family: Loasaceae
- Genus: Mentzelia
- Species: M. multicaulis

Binomial name
- Mentzelia multicaulis (Osterh.) J.Darl.

Synonyms
- Mentzelia pumila var. multicaulis; Nuttallia multicaulis; Touterea multicaulis

= Mentzelia multicaulis =

Plant species in the stickleaf family

Mentzelia multicaulis, also known as manystem blazingstar, is a species of plant in the stickleaf family that is endemic to three counties in the state of Colorado.

== Description ==
Manystem blazingstar is a perennial plant that resembles a bush. When fully grown it can be 15 to 40 centimeters (6 to 16 in) tall. Plants can have an underground caudex or sometimes sprout from rhizomes and have a woody taproot. The stems are sometimes woody near the base and branch frequently. They may be straight or zigzag and may grow straight upwards or outwards close to the ground before growing upwards, but all are hairy.

The leaves range in length from 2 to 5.7 centimeters, but are just 4.2 to 19 millimeters wide. Manystem blazingstars have golden yellow flowers with five true petals and five modified stamens that resemble petals. They are followed by cylindrical to cup shaped fruits with many seeds.

== Taxonomy ==
Mentzelia multicaulis was scientifically described by George Everett Osterhout in 1903 with the name Touterea multicaulis. It was moved to the genus Mentzelia in 1934 by Josephine Darlington, giving the species its accepted name. This was part of a reorganization of Mentzelia confirming the reduction of Touterea to a botanical synonym of Mentzelia and along with Nuttallia which had been revived by Edward Lee Greene in 1906. With the rest of its genus it is classified in the family Loasaceae. It has three heterotypic synonyms.

Table of Synonyms
Name	Year	Rank	Notes
Mentzelia pumila var. multicaulis (Osterh.) A.Nelson	1909	variety	= het.
Nuttallia multicaulis (Osterh.) Osterh.	1912	species	= het.
Touterea multicaulis Osterh.	1903	species	= het.

=== Names ===
Mentzelia multicaulis is known by the common name manystem blazingstar or many-stem blazingstar. It is also sometimes known as the multiple-branched blazingstar.

== Range and habitat ==
The manystem blazingstar is endemic to just three counties in central Colorado, Eagle, Grand, and Summit. They grow in barren areas with few other plants including steep slopes, drainage gullies, and road cuts at elevations of 2,000 to 2,500 meters (6,600 to 8,200 ft). The total size of its range was calculated by NatureServe at 1,000 to 5,000 square kilometers (390 to 1,930 sq mi). Twenty-one occurrences have been documented, but nine have not had growing plants documented in more than 20 years.

It was rated as globally vulnerable by NatureServe when evaluated in 2022.
