= Mentzelia candelariae =

Scientific classification
- Kingdom: Plantae
- Clade: Tracheophytes
- Clade: Angiosperms
- Clade: Eudicots
- Clade: Asterids
- Order: Cornales
- Family: Loasaceae
- Genus: Mentzelia
- Species: M. candelariae

Binomial name
- Mentzelia candelariae H.J.Thomps. & Prigge

Species of flowering plant

Mentzelia candelariae is a wildflower native to Nevada. It has been found in the counties of Churchill, Esmeralda, Mineral, Nye, and Pershing. It is known by the common name candelaria blazingstar.

== Description ==
It grows in "sparsely vegetated washes, steep slopes, hilltops, gravelly, clayey, and sandy soils composed of volcanic ash." It is characterized as an erect perennial herb with white-hairy stems. Plants are generally between 6-14 inches tall. The leaves are up to 3 inches long, are obovate to lanceolate, and have serrate margins. The inflorescence resembles a candelabra, with bright yellow flowers in bloom between May and June.
