= Mentzelia springeri =

Conservation status
- Vulnerable (NatureServe)

Scientific classification
- Kingdom: Plantae
- Clade: Tracheophytes
- Clade: Angiosperms
- Clade: Eudicots
- Clade: Asterids
- Order: Cornales
- Family: Loasaceae
- Genus: Mentzelia
- Species: M. springeri

Binomial name
- Mentzelia springeri (Standl.) Tidestr.

Species of flowering plant

Mentzelia springeri is a species of flowering plant in the family Loasaceae known by the common name Santa Fe blazingstar. It is endemic to New Mexico in the United States, where it occurs in the Jemez Mountains.

This perennial herb forms a mound of branching stems, giving it a bushy look. The white stems are up to 30 to 50 centimeters tall. The leaves are linear to lance-shaped, the lowest ones measuring up to 4 centimeters in length. The leaves are covered in barbed hairs that will stick to cloth. The flowers are borne at the ends of the stems. Each has 10 bright yellow glossy petals just over a centimeter long. The flowers bloom in July and August and open in the late afternoon. The fruit is a capsule up to a centimeter long.

This plant grows on rock outcrops in substrates of pumice and ash. The habitat is pinyon-juniper woodland and Ponderosa pine forest. Other plants in the habitat include Apache plume, rubber rabbitbrush, brownplume wirelettuce, sticky gilia, and gypsum phacelia.

Much of this plant's range is within Bandelier National Monument.

There are few threats to its survival because it occurs in remote territory. Soil disturbance is not necessarily detrimental to the plant; it often grows along roads cut through the pumice.
