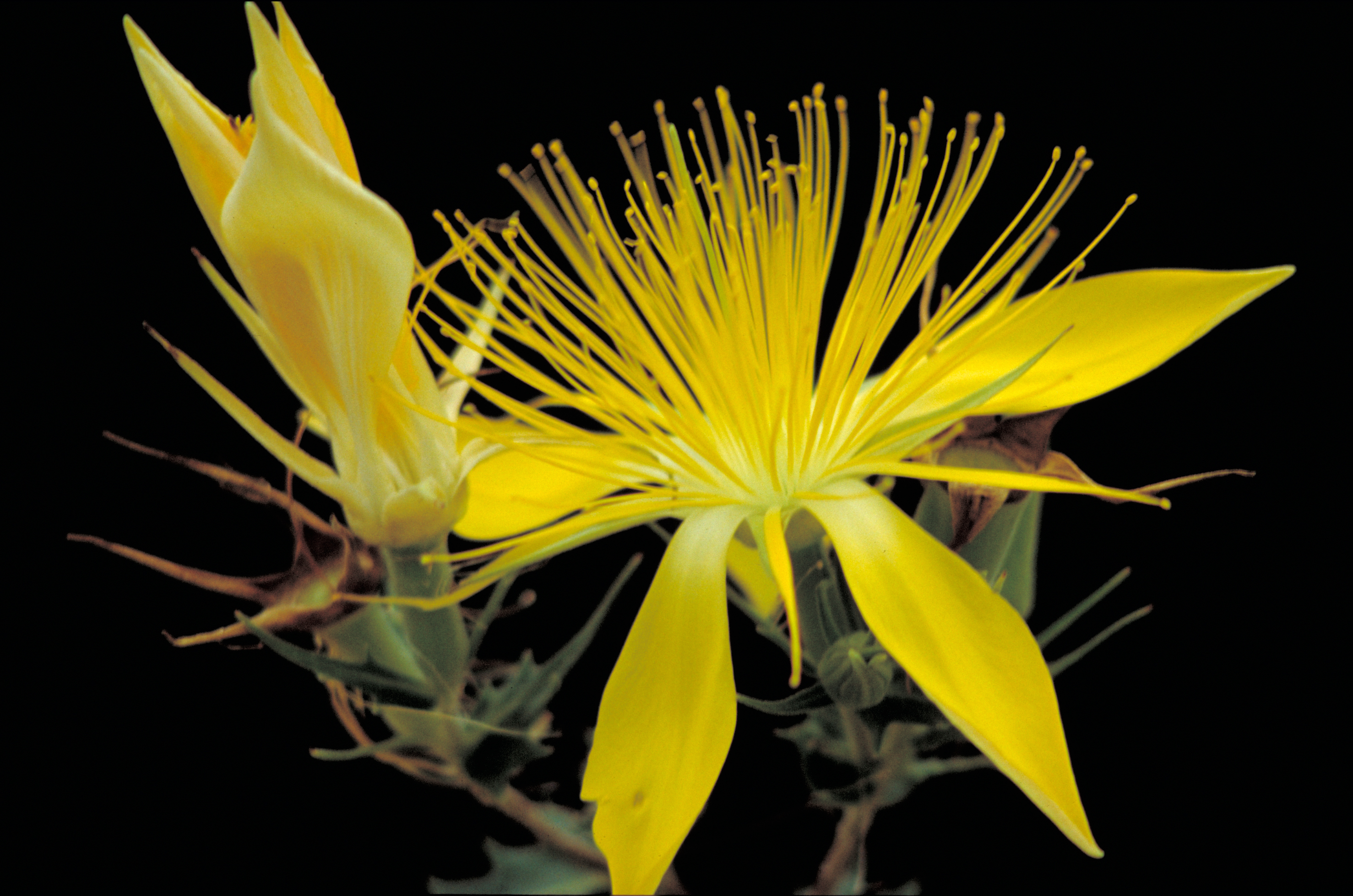
- Adonis blazingstar

Scientific classification
- Kingdom: Plantae
- Clade: Tracheophytes
- Clade: Angiosperms
- Clade: Eudicots
- Clade: Asterids
- Order: Cornales
- Family: Loasaceae
- Genus: Mentzelia
- Species: M. multiflora

Binomial name
- Mentzelia multiflora (Nutt.) A.Gray

Synonyms
- List: Bartonia multiflora; Hesperaster multiflorus; Mentzelia lutea; Mentzelia pumila var. multiflora; Nuttallia lutea; Nuttallia multiflora; Touterea lutea; Touterea multiflora

= Mentzelia multiflora =

Plant species in the stickleaf family

Mentzelia multiflora, commonly known as Adonis blazingstar, Adonis stickleaf, desert blazingstar, prairie stickleaf and manyflowered mentzelia is a herbaceous perennial wildflower of the family Loasaceae.

== Distribution ==
Mentzelia multiflora is found in the western United States and northwestern Mexico: from Montana and North Dakota in the Great Plains; south to Texas and Southern California; and into Sonora and Chihuahua.

This species prefers dry, sandy, well-drained soil. They require direct sunlight and are not found growing in the shade.

== Description ==
Mentzelia multiflora grows to about 2–2.5 feet (0.61–0.76 m) tall. It has shiny white stems and numerous branches. Its sticky, bright green leaves are covered with hairs containing minute barbs.

The flowers are around 5 cm (2.0 in) in diameter, are yellow in colour and normally have ten petals. The flowers open in late afternoon and close in the morning. The flowers are hermaphrodite and flower from March to October. The plant does not live for more than three years.

=== Varieties ===
Varieties of Mentzelia multiflora include:

- Mentzelia multiflora var. integra — M.E. Jones
- Mentzelia multiflora var. longiloba — (J. Darl.) Kartesz
- Mentzelia multiflora var. multiflora

=== Taxonomy ===
Mentzelia multiflora was first described by the botanists Thomas Nuttall and Asa Gray. It is a "blazingstar" and is a member of the genus Mentzelia, the "stickleafs".

== Uses ==
Medicinal

The plant is used by the Native Americans, particularly the Navajo people, as a medicinal plant. It has been used to treat toothache and as a diuretic. The roots and leaves have been used to treat tuberculosis.

Cultivation

The plant is cultivated as an ornamental plant, used as a wildflower in specialty gardens.
