= Mentzelia eremophila =

Scientific classification
- Kingdom: Plantae
- Clade: Tracheophytes
- Clade: Angiosperms
- Clade: Eudicots
- Clade: Asterids
- Order: Cornales
- Family: Loasaceae
- Genus: Mentzelia
- Species: M. eremophila

Binomial name
- Mentzelia eremophila (Jeps.) H.J. Thomp. & Roberts

Species of flowering plant

Mentzelia eremophila is an uncommon species of flowering plant in the family Loasaceae known by the common names pinyon blazingstar and solitary blazingstar.

== Distribution ==
It is endemic to the Mojave Desert of California, where it grows in sandy scrub and sometimes disturbed areas.

== Description ==
It is an annual herb producing an erect light brown to nearly white stem up to about 43 centimetres (17 in) in maximum height. The leaves are divided deeply into lobes, the longest in the basal rosette approaching 10 centimetres (4 in) long and those higher on the stem reduced in size.

The inflorescence is a cluster of flowers each with five shiny yellow petals one to over two centimeters long. The fruit is a narrow, curving utricle up to 4 centimetres (1.6 inches) long which contains many tiny seeds. The grainlike seeds are each about 1 millimetre (0.04 inches) long and appear bumpy under magnification.
