= Mentzelia oreophila =

Scientific classification
- Kingdom: Plantae
- Clade: Tracheophytes
- Clade: Angiosperms
- Clade: Eudicots
- Clade: Asterids
- Order: Cornales
- Family: Loasaceae
- Genus: Mentzelia
- Species: M. oreophila

Binomial name
- Mentzelia oreophila J.Darl.

Species of flowering plant

Mentzelia oreophila is a species of flowering plant in the family Loasaceae known by the common name Argus blazingstar. It is native to the Southwestern United States and the Mojave Desert sky islands in California. It grows in rocky desert and scrub habitat.

== Description ==
It is a perennial herb producing several tangling, sometimes multibranched stems up to 40 centimeters long which are whitish in color and peeling in texture. The leaves are wavy and sometimes toothed, the upper ones clasping the stem.

The inflorescence is an array of many flowers. Each flower has five narrow yellow petals and five staminodes which look very similar to, and may be mistaken for, more petals. At the center of the flower are many whiskery stamens. The fruit is cup-shaped utricle up to a centimeter long and wide. It contains many tiny winged, lens-shaped seeds which are bumpy under magnification.
