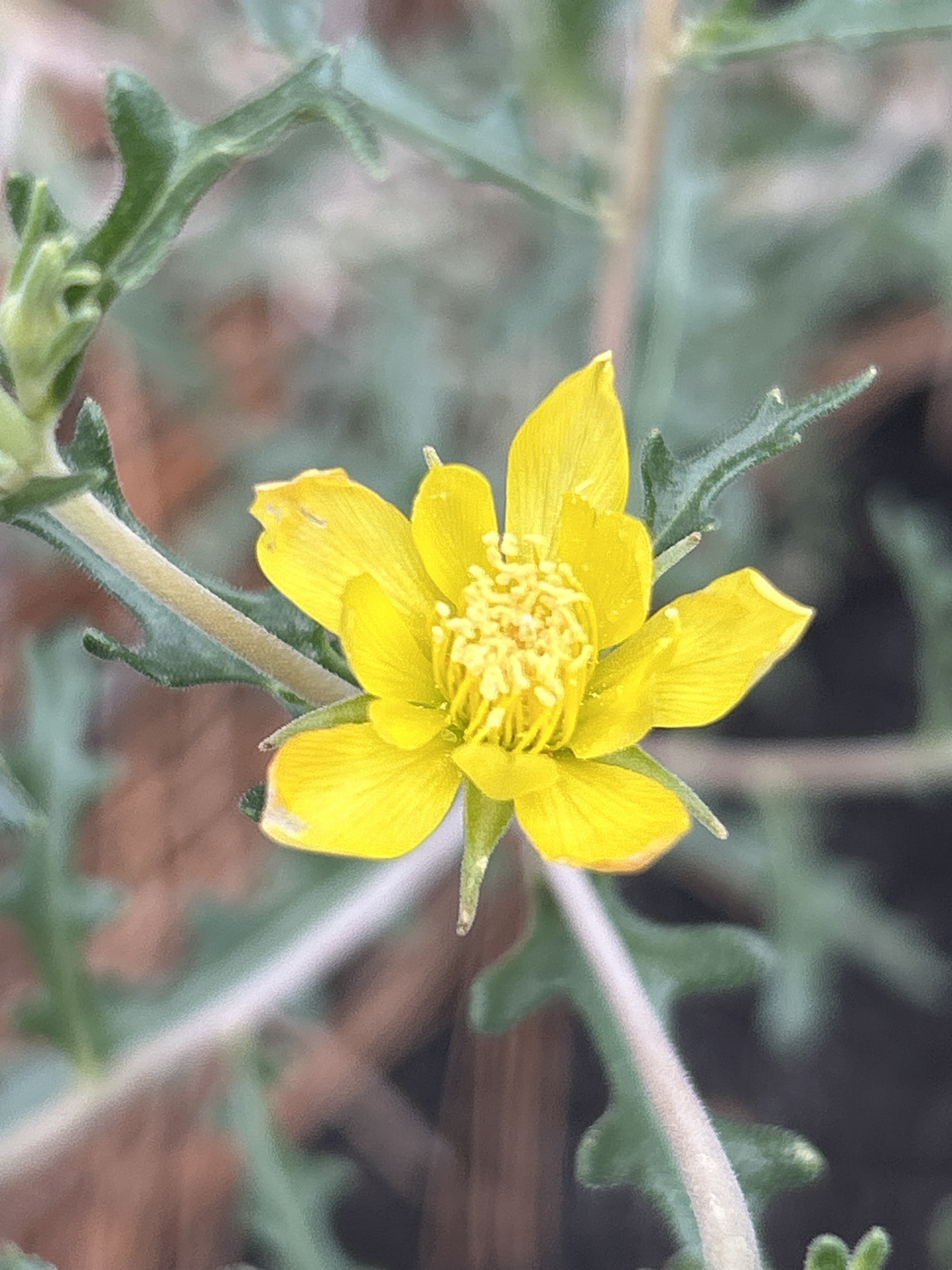
- Mentzelia collomiae in the Sunset Crater Volcano National Monument

Scientific classification
- Kingdom: Plantae
- Clade: Tracheophytes
- Clade: Angiosperms
- Clade: Eudicots
- Clade: Asterids
- Order: Cornales
- Family: Loasaceae
- Genus: Mentzelia
- Species: M. collomiae

Binomial name
- Mentzelia collomiae Christy

= Mentzelia collomiae =

Species of flowering plant

Mentzelia collomiae, known by the common name Sunset Crater blazingstar, is a species of flowering plant endemic to Arizona, known only to occur in the San Francisco Volcanic Field of Coconino County, primarily in the Sunset Crater Volcano National Monument.

== Description ==
This perennial herb can grow to be up to 35 cm (14 in) tall and produce branches along the entire length, the leaves can grow to be 5 cm (2.0 in) long and 14 mm (0.55 in) wide, and are typically lanceolate with toothed or shallowly lobed margins. It's pedicellate yellow flowers have been observed to bloom from June to October, opening for a short period in the early evening and closing after dusk. There are 5 spatulate petals, ranging to be 5–11 cm (2.0–4.3 in) long and 2–4 mm (0.08–0.16 in) wide, with the apices appearing obtuse or acute depending on the width.

== Habitat ==
The only suitable habitat for M. collomiae is found within the 110 square miles of the San Francisco Volcanic Fields, where it occurs on the flat ground and relatively undisturbed slopes of the volcanic cinders, with Pinus ponderosa as the dominant plant species. The main population of M. collomiae inhabits the area around the Sunset Crater National Monument, with an isolated population at the nearby Red Mountain. There is little soil development, with the cinder landscape being sparsely vegetated to barren. The cinders of its habitat average 1 cm in diameter, with M. collomiae being unable to grow in cinders with the consistency of coarse sand, large cinders, or lava fragments that make up most other cinder cones.
