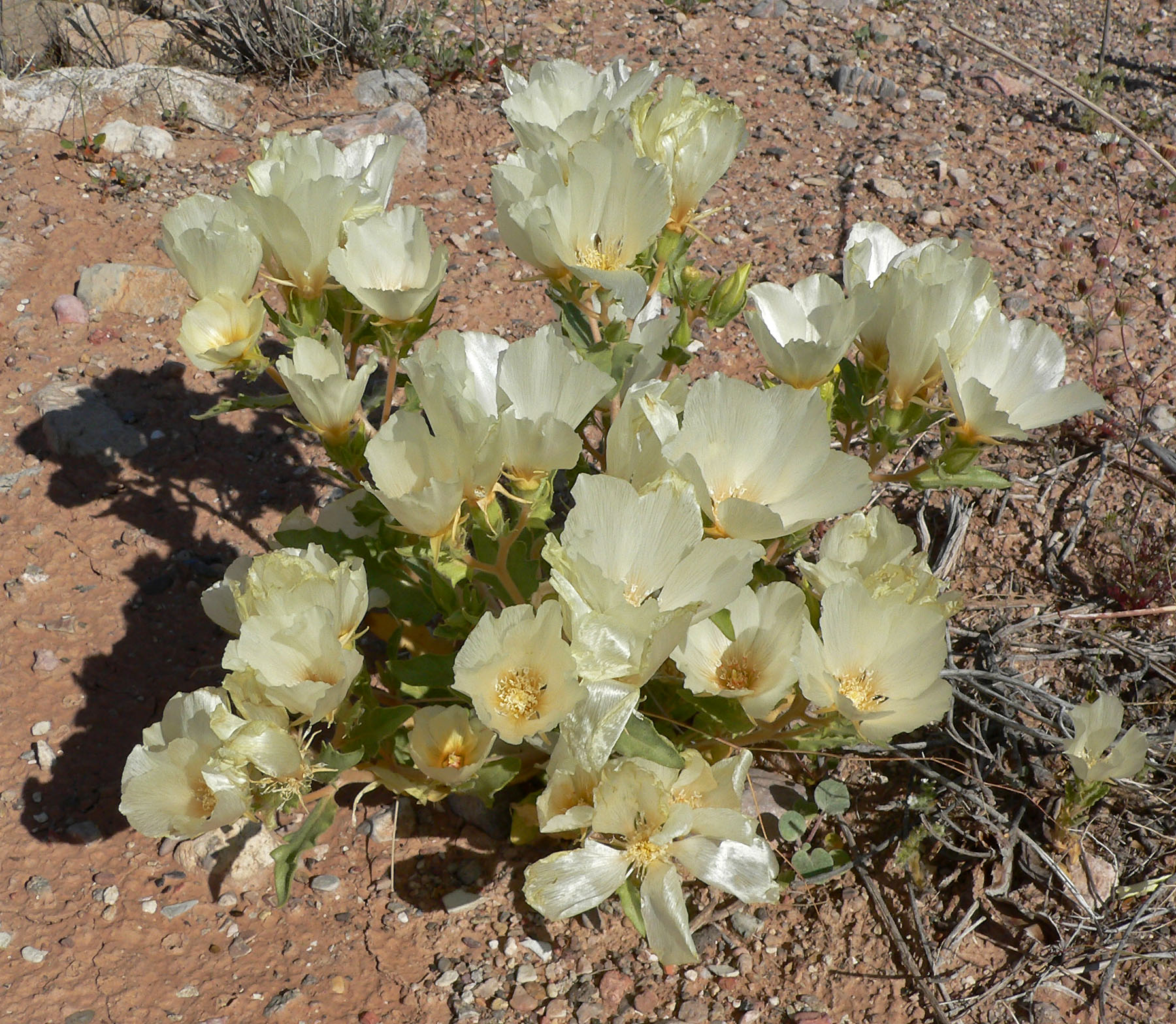

Scientific classification
- Kingdom: Plantae
- Clade: Tracheophytes
- Clade: Angiosperms
- Clade: Eudicots
- Clade: Asterids
- Order: Cornales
- Family: Loasaceae
- Genus: Mentzelia
- Species: M. tricuspis

Binomial name
- Mentzelia tricuspis A.Gray

= Mentzelia tricuspis =

Species of flowering plant

Mentzelia tricuspis is a species of flowering plant in the family Loasaceae known by the common name spinyhair blazingstar.

It is native to the Southwestern United States and California where it grows in deserts, such as the Sonoran Desert, and adjacent mountains in scrub and woodland habitats.

== Description ==
Mentzelia tricuspis is an annual herb growing erect or spreading to a maximum height near 27 centimeters. The leaves are up to 12 centimeters long and toothed or wavy along the edges.

The inflorescence is a cluster of cream-colored flowers with petals up to 5 centimeters long and thready-tipped stamens.

The fruit is a cylindrical utricle up to 1.5 centimeters long which contains many tiny whitish beaked seeds.
