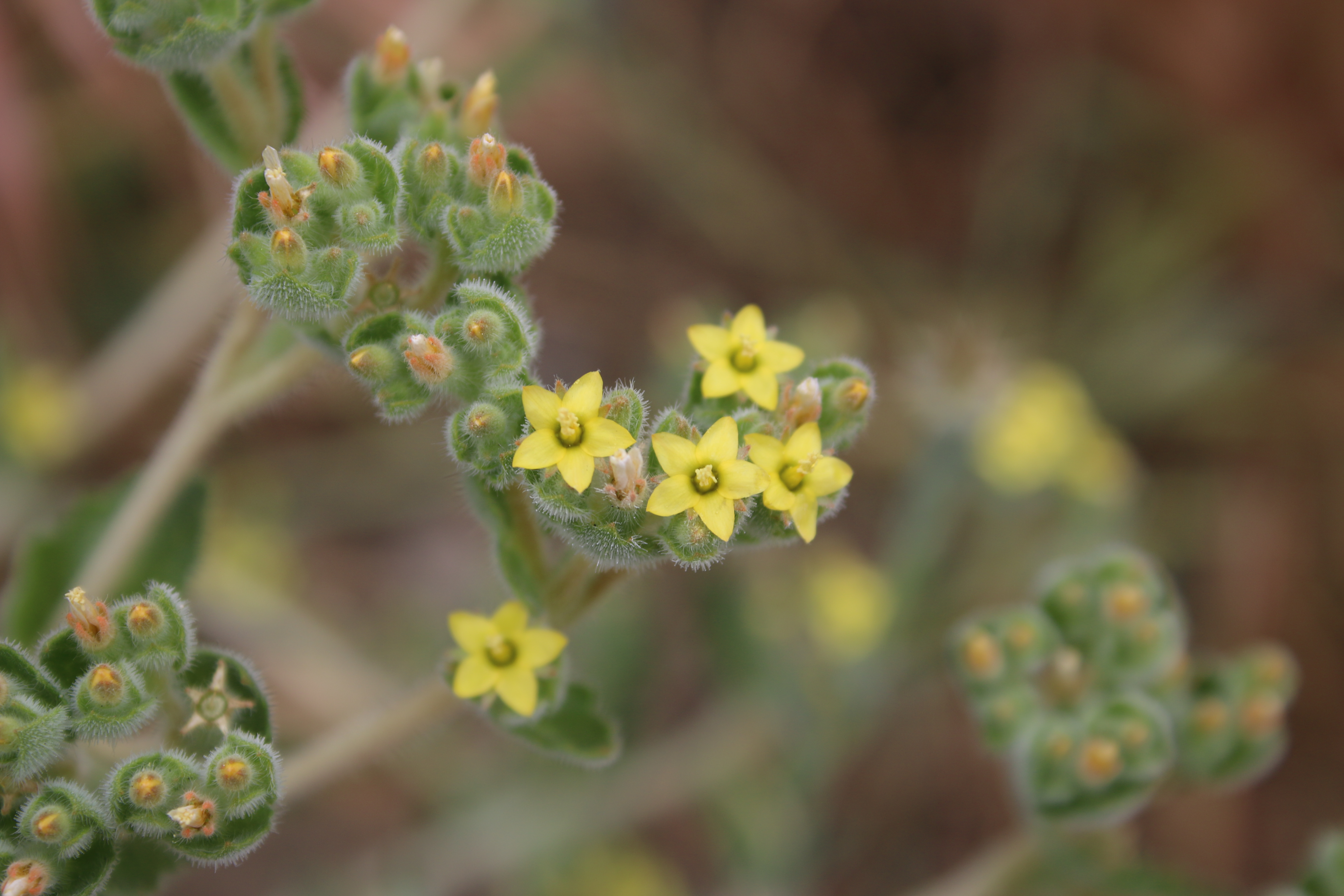

Scientific classification
- Kingdom: Plantae
- Clade: Tracheophytes
- Clade: Angiosperms
- Clade: Eudicots
- Clade: Asterids
- Order: Cornales
- Family: Loasaceae
- Genus: Mentzelia
- Species: M. micrantha

Binomial name
- Mentzelia micrantha (Hook. & Arn.) Torr. & A.Gray

= Mentzelia micrantha =

Species of flowering plant

Mentzelia micrantha is a species of flowering plant in the family Loasaceae known by the common name San Luis blazingstar.

It is native to the coastal mountain ranges of western North America from just north of the San Francisco Bay Area to Baja California. It grows in several types of mountain slope and hillside habitat, including chaparral and sometimes disturbed areas.

== Description ==
This is an annual herb producing an erect green stem 10 to 80 centimeters in maximum height. The leaves are toothed or wavy along the edges, the longest in the basal rosette up to 18 centimeters long and those higher on the stem reduced in size.

The inflorescence is an open array of several clusters of small flowers, each flower accompanied by a single wide bract sometimes larger than the flower itself. The five yellow petals of the flower are under half a centimeter long. The fruit is a narrow cylindrical utricle containing several tiny, pyramidal seeds.
