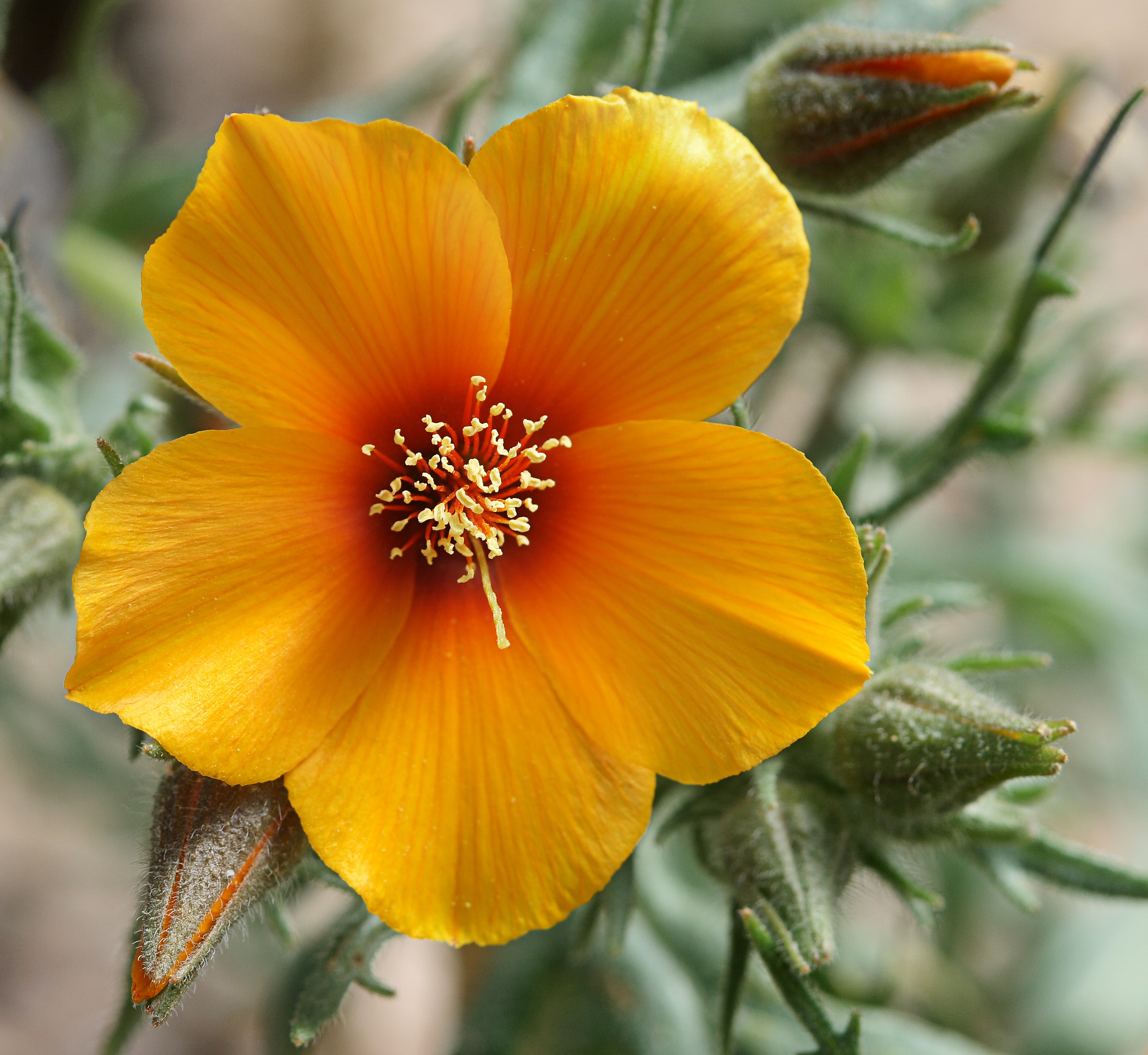

Scientific classification
- Kingdom: Plantae
- Clade: Tracheophytes
- Clade: Angiosperms
- Clade: Eudicots
- Clade: Asterids
- Order: Cornales
- Family: Loasaceae
- Genus: Mentzelia
- Species: M. pectinata

Binomial name
- Mentzelia pectinata Kellogg

= Mentzelia pectinata =

Species of flowering plant

Mentzelia pectinata is a species of flowering plant in the family Loasaceae known by the common name San Joaquin blazingstar.

== Distribution ==
It is endemic to California, where it grows in the hills and mountains on either side of the San Joaquin Valley, including the Temblor Range, the Tehachapi Mountains, and the southern Sierra Nevada. It grows on grassy slopes, woodlands, and other local habitat.

== Description ==
Mentzelia pectinata is an annual herb producing an erect, green stem up to about half a meter tall. The leaves are up to 12 centimeters long in the basal rosette and divided into comblike lobes, and those higher on the stem are reduced in size.

The inflorescence is a cluster of flowers with orange to yellow petals up to 2 centimeters long and often marked with red near the bases. At the center of the flower are many whiskery stamens. The fruit is a narrow, straight utricle up to 3.5 centimeters long which contains many tiny, angular seeds.
