= Mentzelia reflexa =

Scientific classification
- Kingdom: Plantae
- Clade: Tracheophytes
- Clade: Angiosperms
- Clade: Eudicots
- Clade: Asterids
- Order: Cornales
- Family: Loasaceae
- Genus: Mentzelia
- Species: M. reflexa

Binomial name
- Mentzelia reflexa Coville

Species of flowering plant

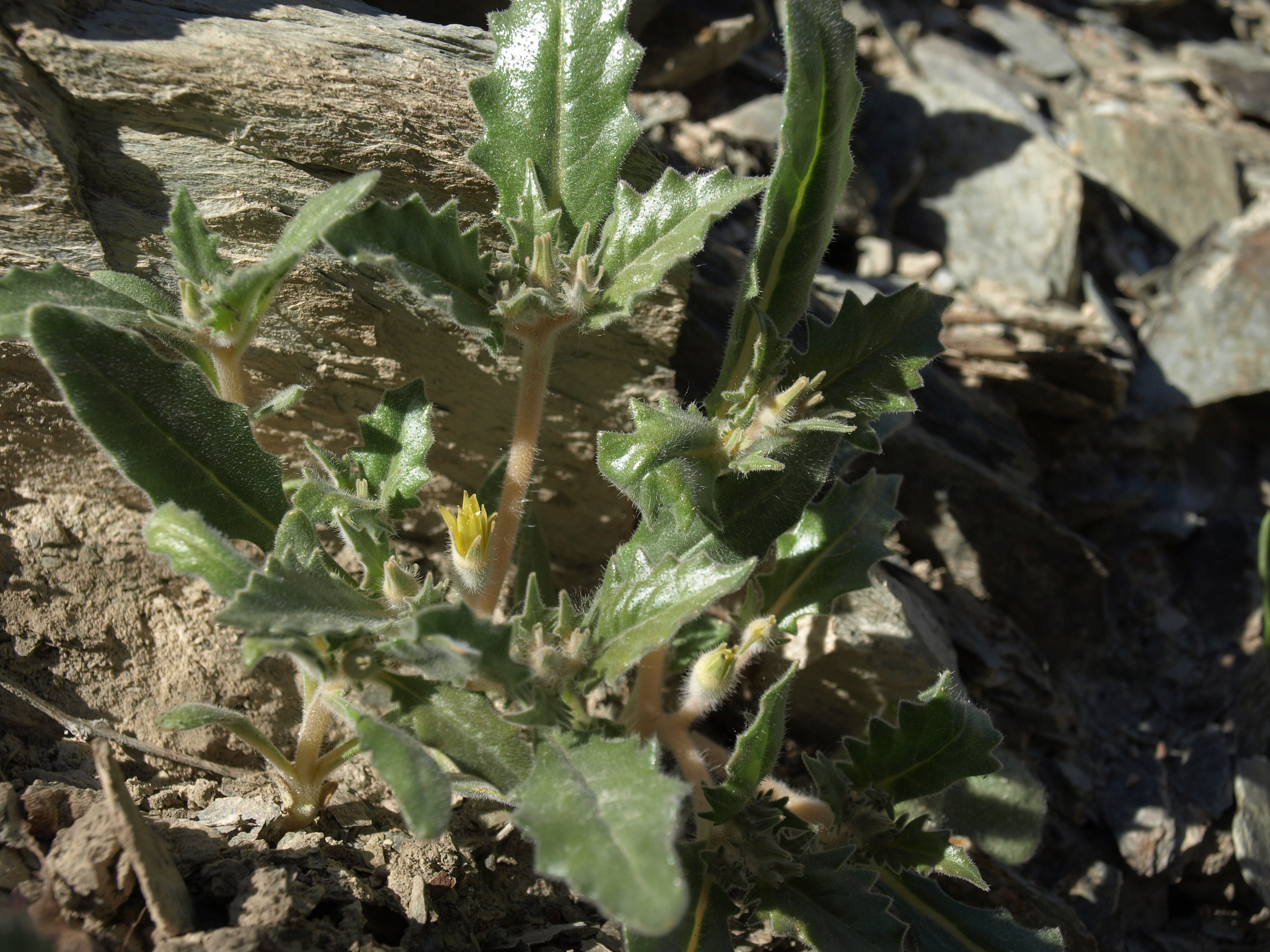
Mentzelia reflexa (Mono County, California)

Mentzelia reflexa is a species of flowering plant in the family Loasaceae known by the common name reflexed blazingstar.

It is native to the Mojave Desert and adjacent mountain ranges in California and Nevada, where it grows in rocky habitat and sometimes disturbed areas.

== Description ==
It is an annual herb growing up to 20 centimeters tall and taking a rounded or clumped form. The abundant leaves are up to 10 centimeters long and toothed along the edges. The inflorescence is a cluster of flowers each with eight pale yellow petals. The fruit is a cylindrical utricle roughly a centimeter long containing many tiny bumpy white seeds.
