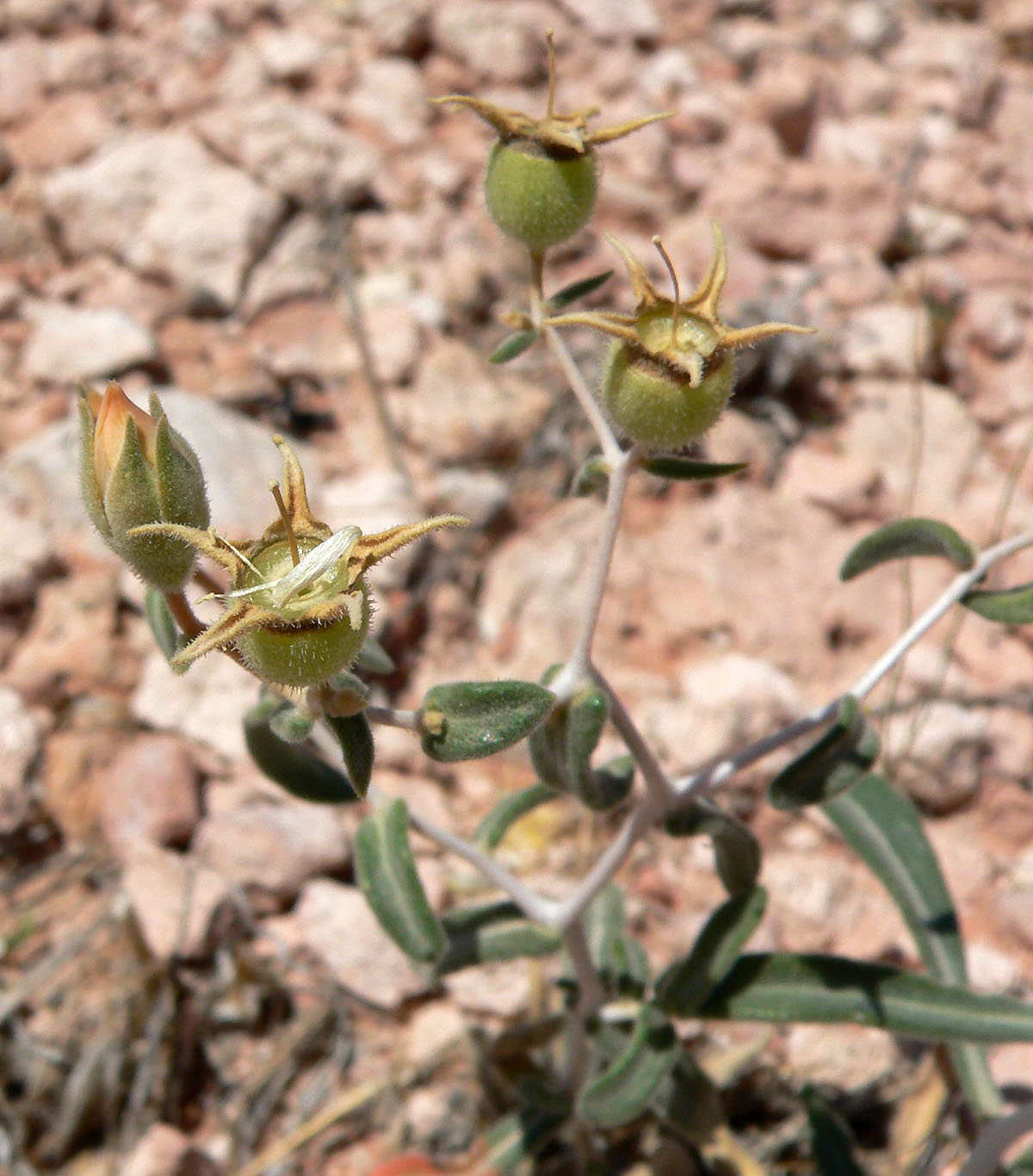
- Fruits

Conservation status
- Imperiled (NatureServe)

Scientific classification
- Kingdom: Plantae
- Clade: Tracheophytes
- Clade: Angiosperms
- Clade: Eudicots
- Clade: Asterids
- Order: Cornales
- Family: Loasaceae
- Genus: Mentzelia
- Species: M. polita

Binomial name
- Mentzelia polita A.Nelson

= Mentzelia polita =

Species of flowering plant

Mentzelia polita is a species of flowering plant in the family Loasaceae known by the common name polished blazingstar. It is native to the southwestern United States, where it grows in desert mountains, washes, and other dry habitat.

== Description ==
It is a perennial herb producing a peeling white stem from a caudex, reaching up to about 30 centimeters in maximum height. The lance-shaped leaves are a few centimeters long and have no teeth or lobes.

The inflorescence is a cluster of flowers with pale yellow to nearly white petals up to 1.4 centimeters long. The fruit is a cup-shaped utricle under a centimeter wide which contains many lens-shaped, bumpy seeds about 3 millimeters wide.
