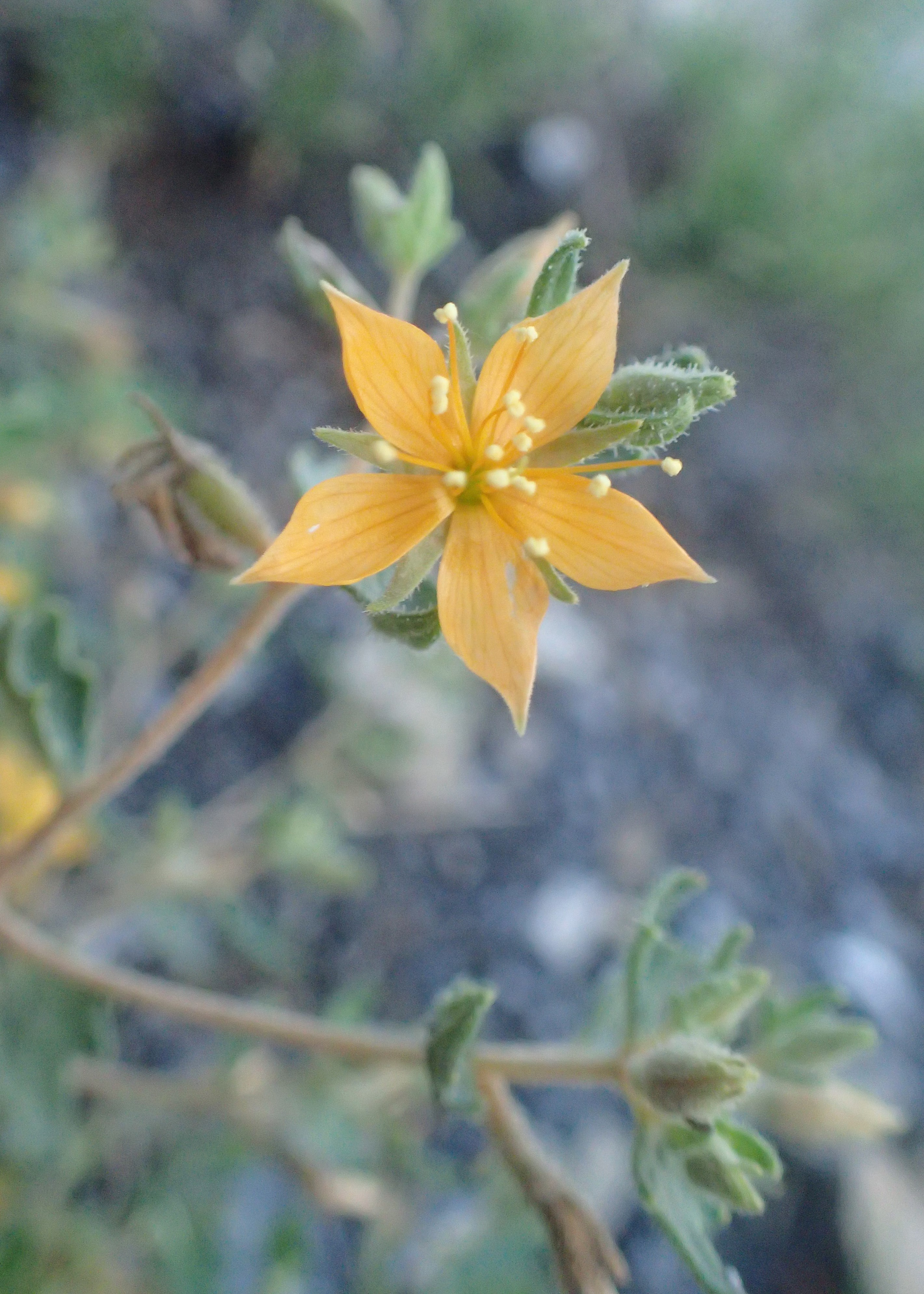
- Close-up of flower
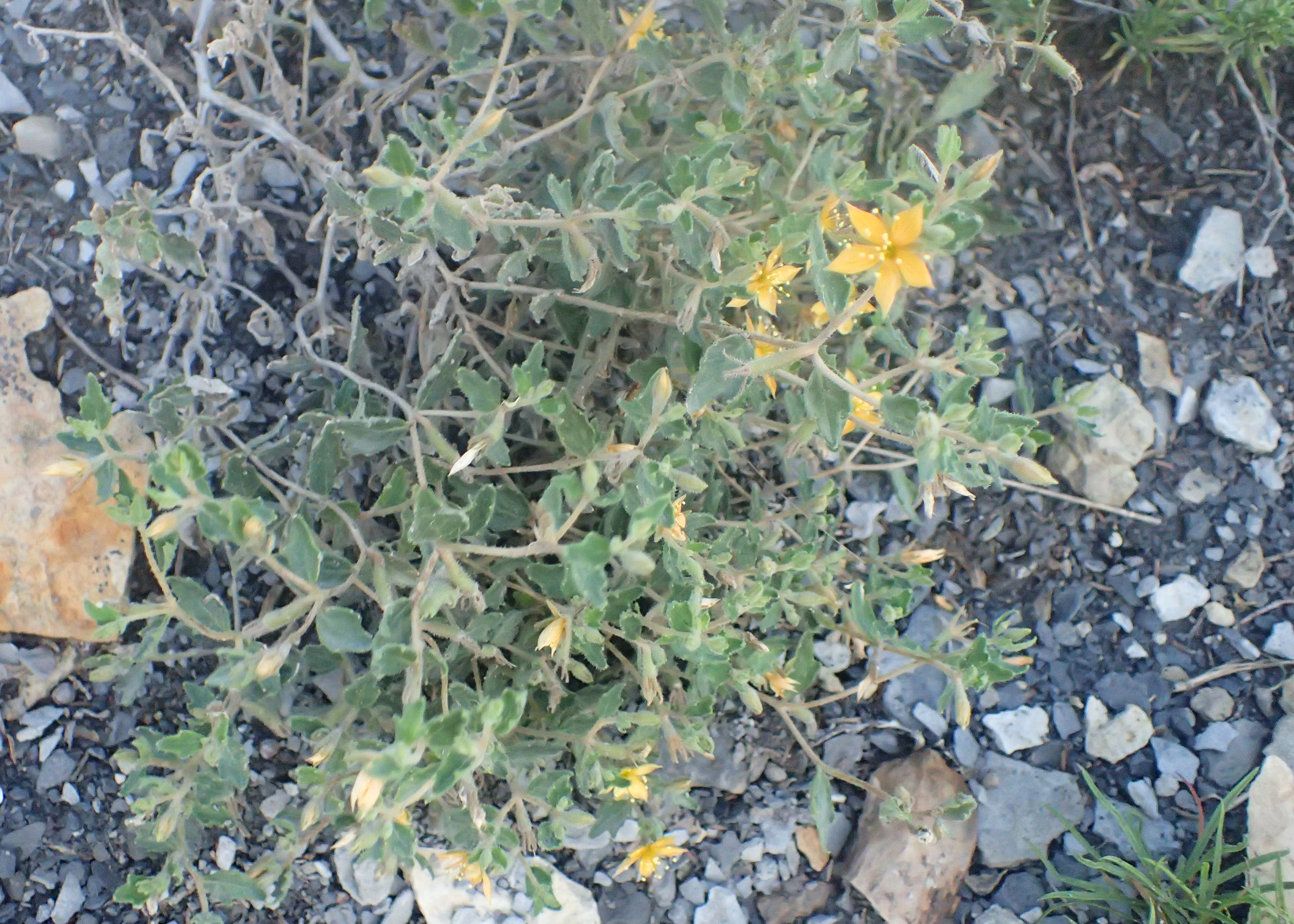
- Habit

Conservation status
- Apparently Secure (NatureServe)

Scientific classification
- Kingdom: Plantae
- Clade: Tracheophytes
- Clade: Angiosperms
- Clade: Eudicots
- Clade: Asterids
- Order: Cornales
- Family: Loasaceae
- Genus: Mentzelia
- Species: M. oligosperma

Binomial name
- Mentzelia oligosperma Nutt. ex Sims

Synonyms
- List: Creolobus aureus (Nutt.) Lilja; Mentzelia aurea Nutt.; Mentzelia diehlii M.E.Jones; Mentzelia monosperma Wooton & Standl.; Mentzelia nelsonii Greene; Mentzelia petiolata Buckley; Mentzelia rhombifolia Nutt.

= Mentzelia oligosperma =

Species of plant

Mentzelia oligosperma, the stick-leaf or chickenthief, is a species of flowering plant in the family Loasaceae. It is native to the warmer parts of the west-central and central United States. A perennial reaching 50 cm (20 in), its yellow to orange flowers open in the morning and close by the early afternoon.
