= Mentzelia memorabilis =

Scientific classification
- Kingdom: Plantae
- Clade: Tracheophytes
- Clade: Angiosperms
- Clade: Eudicots
- Clade: Asterids
- Order: Cornales
- Family: Loasaceae
- Genus: Mentzelia
- Species: M. memorabilis

Binomial name
- Mentzelia memorabilis N.H.Holmgren & P.K.Holmgren

Species of shrub

Mentzelia memorabilis, the nine-eleven blazingstar, is a shrub-like perennial endemic to the Uinkaret Plateau in Mohave County, Arizona, and adjacent Washington County, Utah. This is a species of conservation concern throughout its range.

Nine-eleven blazingstar can be found between 1400 and 1700 meters in elevation growing on gypsiferous outcrops of the Harrisburg formation.
