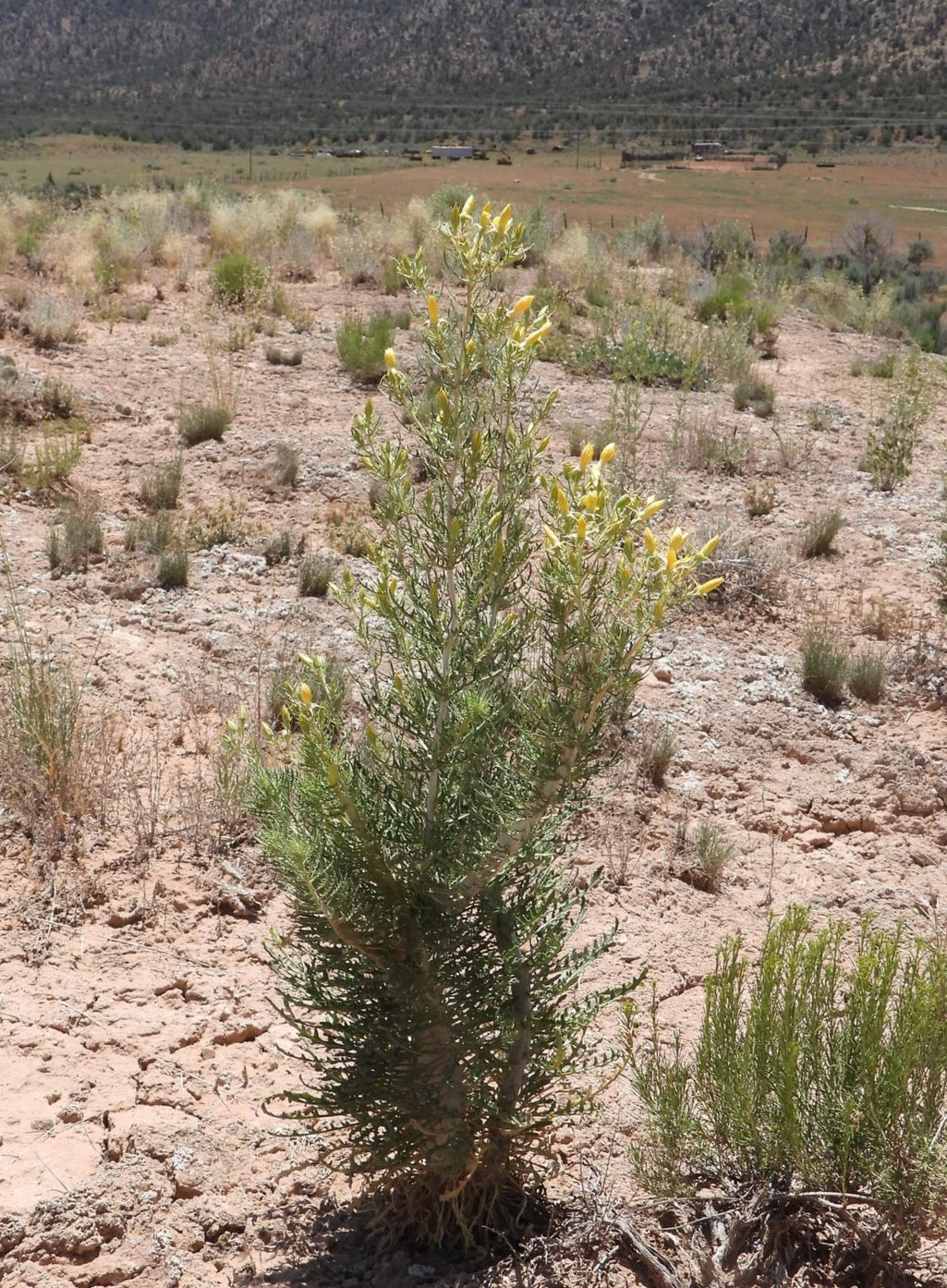
- Along Colorado State Highway 90 in Paradox Valley

Conservation status
- Imperiled (NatureServe)

Scientific classification
- Kingdom: Plantae
- Clade: Tracheophytes
- Clade: Angiosperms
- Clade: Eudicots
- Clade: Asterids
- Order: Cornales
- Family: Loasaceae
- Genus: Mentzelia
- Species: M. paradoxensis

Binomial name
- Mentzelia paradoxensis J.J.Schenk & L.Hufford

= Mentzelia paradoxensis =

Plant species in the stickleaf family

Mentzelia paradoxensis, also known as the Paradox Valley blazingstar, is a species of plant that is endemic to western Colorado in the Paradox and Gypsum valleys.

== Description ==
Paradox Valley blazingstar is a biennial or short-lived perennial herbaceous plant with a taproot. They have a single, straight stem, that can branch near its end or along its entire length. The side branches grow outwards and then upwards in parallel to the central stem. Branches can more or less reach the same height as the main stem, the whole plant growing 40 to 90 centimeters (16 to 35 in) tall.

== Taxonomy and names ==
Mentzelia paradoxensis was scientifically described in 2010 by John J. Schenk and Larry Hufford. It is part of the Mentzelia genus classified in the family Loasaceae. It has no botanical synonyms. Its species name refers to the Paradox Valley. It is similarly known by the common names Paradox Valley blazingstar or Paradox stickleaf.

== Range, habitat, and conservation ==
Paradox Valley blazingstar is a very narrow endemic, limited to just two valleys, Paradox Valley and Gypsum Valley, in far western Colorado. It is found in two counties, Montrose and San Miguel. There it grows on outcrops of gypsum where few other plants manage to grow. It occurs at elevations of 1,500–2,000 meters (4,900–6,600 ft). There are nine known populations across its range of approximately 250–1,000 km^{2} (100–390 sq mi).

When evaluated by NatureServe in 2023 they rated it imperiled at the global (G2) and state (s2) levels. It is highly vulnerable to climate change, but other possible threats from land use are not well understood.
