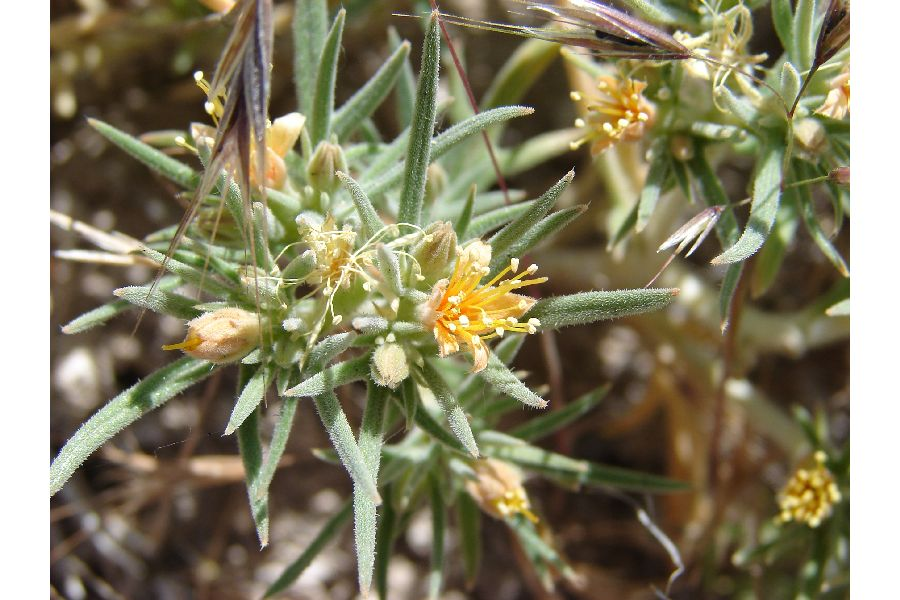

Scientific classification
- Kingdom: Plantae
- Clade: Embryophytes
- Clade: Tracheophytes
- Clade: Spermatophytes
- Clade: Angiosperms
- Clade: Eudicots
- Clade: Asterids
- Order: Cornales
- Family: Loasaceae
- Genus: Mentzelia
- Species: M. torreyi

Binomial name
- Mentzelia torreyi A.Gray

= Mentzelia torreyi =

Species of flowering plant

Mentzelia torreyi is a species of flowering plant in the family Loasaceae known by the common name Torrey's blazingstar. It is native to the western United States where it grows in the Great Basin and surrounding areas in desert, scrub, woodland, and other habitat.

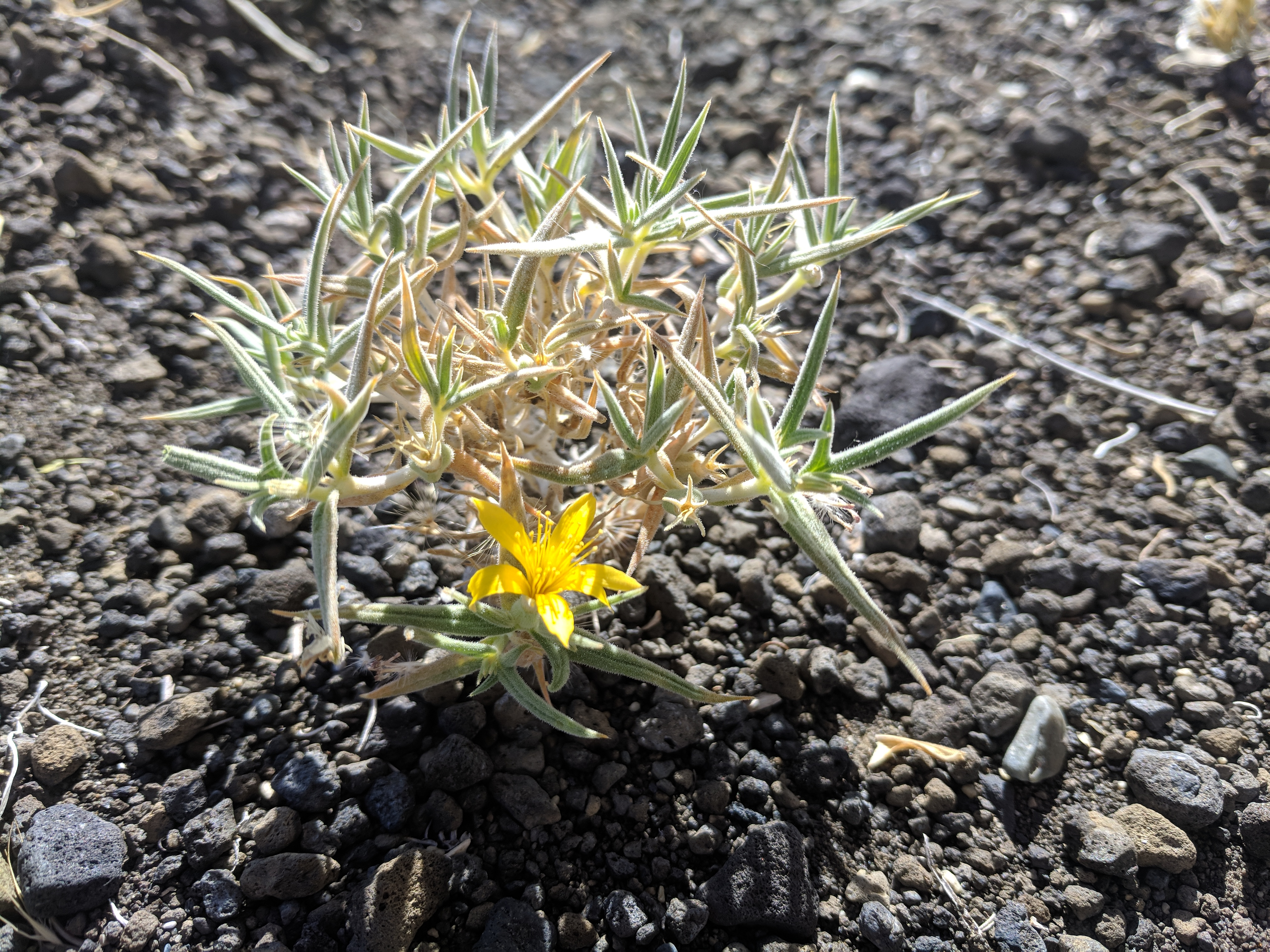
Mentzelia torreyi at Mono Lake, CA

== Description ==
It is a perennial herb growing in a small clump 10 to 16 centimeters high. The leaves are 2 to 4 centimeters long, sometimes divided into a few narrow lobes with rolled edges.

The inflorescence is a cluster of flowers each with yellow petals up to 1.5 centimeters long and many whiskery stamens each up to a centimeter in length. The fruit is an urn-shaped utricle containing many tiny bullet-shaped seeds.

== Taxonomy ==
Mentzelia torreyi was scientifically described in 1874 by botanist Asa Gray. He placed it in the Mentzelia genus which is classified in the Loasaceae family. It has two accepted varieties.

- Mentzelia torreyi var. acerosa
- Mentzelia torreyi var. torreyi
