= Mentzelia congesta =

Conservation status
- Secure (NatureServe)

Scientific classification
- Kingdom: Plantae
- Clade: Embryophytes
- Clade: Tracheophytes
- Clade: Spermatophytes
- Clade: Angiosperms
- Clade: Eudicots
- Clade: Asterids
- Order: Cornales
- Family: Loasaceae
- Genus: Mentzelia
- Species: M. congesta

Binomial name
- Mentzelia congesta Nutt ex Torr. & A.Gray

Species of flowering plant

Mentzelia congesta is a species of flowering plants in the family Loasaceae known by the common name united blazingstar.

== Distribution ==
The plant is native to four states in the western United States, from Idaho, Oregon, Nevada, and California.

It grows in forest, scrub, chaparral, and woodland habitats. It is found at 1,500–2,700 metres (4,900–8,900 ft) in elevation.

== Description ==
It is an annual herb producing a tan-colored erect stem up to 40 centimeters tall. The leaves are up to 9 centimeters long and may be smooth-edged or lobed.

The inflorescence is a dense cluster of flowers wrapped in wide, toothed bracts which are white in color with green tips. Each flower has five shiny yellow petals 3 to 9 millimeters long, each with an orange spot near the base.

The fruit is a narrow, straight utricle up to 12 millimeters in length. It contains many minute angular seeds with concave sides covered in tiny bumps.
