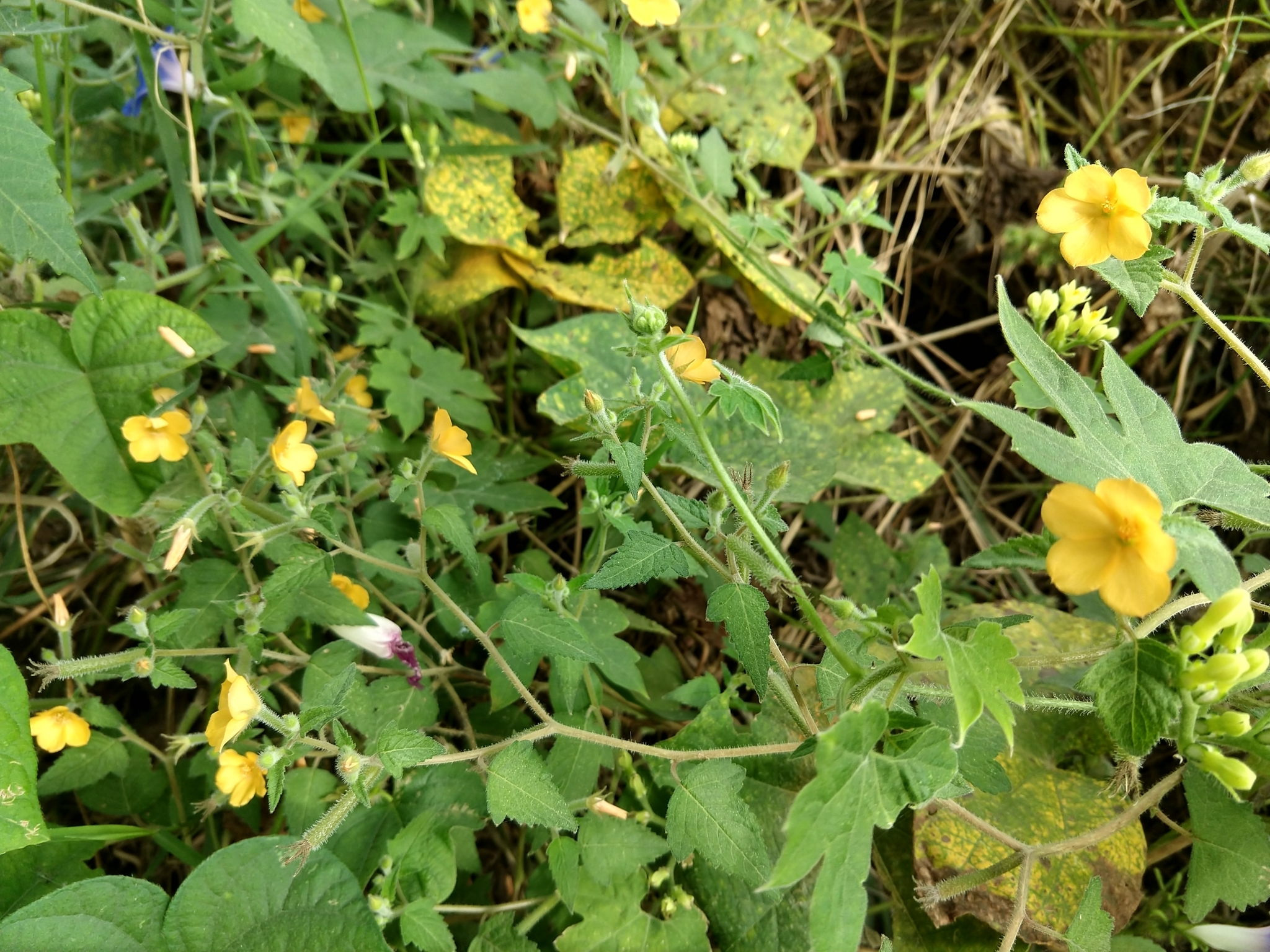
- In Chiapas, Mexico
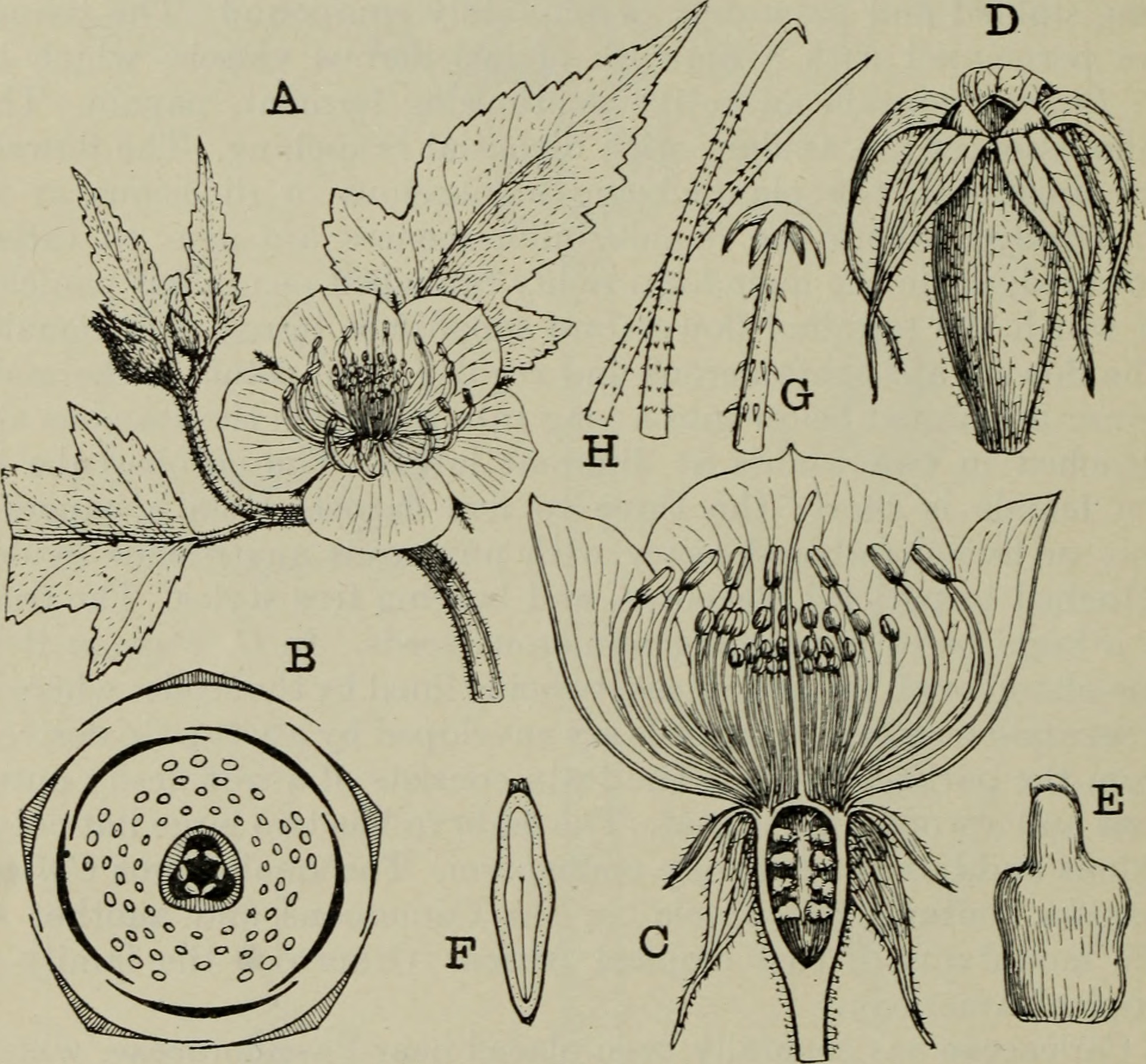
- Botanical illustration

Scientific classification
- Kingdom: Plantae
- Clade: Tracheophytes
- Clade: Angiosperms
- Clade: Eudicots
- Clade: Asterids
- Order: Cornales
- Family: Loasaceae
- Genus: Mentzelia
- Species: M. aspera

Binomial name
- Mentzelia aspera L.

Synonyms
- List: Acrolasia squalida Hook.f.; Mentzelia aspera var. canescens Andersson; Mentzelia aspera var. lobata Andersson; Mentzelia aspera var. virescens Andersson; Mentzelia corumbaensis Hoehne; Mentzelia fragilis Huber; Mentzelia pedicellata C.Presl; Mentzelia propinqua F.Aresch.; Mentzelia stipitata C.Presl; Mentzelia triloba Ruiz & Pav.

= Mentzelia aspera =

Species of plant

Mentzelia aspera, the tropical blazingstar, is a species of flowering plant in the family Loasaceae. It is native to the subtropical and tropical New World, from Arizona to northwestern Argentina, and it has been introduced to Cape Verde. An annual reaching 75 cm (30 in), it is found in a variety of habitats, including desert scrublands and grasslands, and in riverine situations, such as arroyos and canyon bottoms, often in association with cottonwoods and willows.
