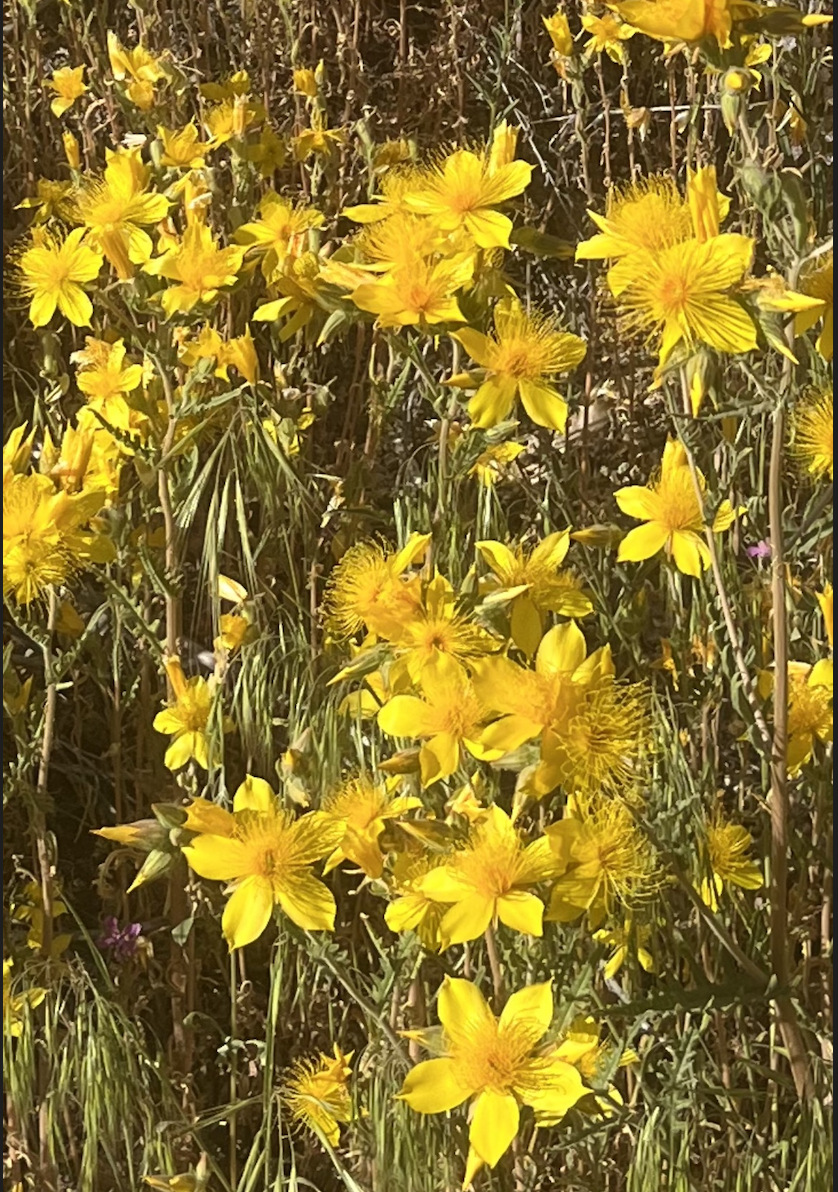
- Mentzelia crocea, the Sierra blazing star, in full bloom in a recently burned area along Mineral King road in Sequoia National Park (May 26th, 2024)

Scientific classification
- Kingdom: Plantae
- Clade: Tracheophytes
- Clade: Angiosperms
- Clade: Eudicots
- Clade: Asterids
- Order: Cornales
- Family: Loasaceae
- Genus: Mentzelia
- Species: M. crocea

Binomial name
- Mentzelia crocea Kellogg

= Mentzelia crocea =

Species of flowering plant

Mentzelia crocea, the Sierra blazingstar or saffron blazing star, is an annual wildflower endemic to the Sierra Nevada foothills of California.

The flowering plant can be found up to 4,920 feet (1,500 m) elevation.

== Description ==
The stem grows up to a meter tall. The lobed leaves in the basal rosette are up to 20 centimeters long; those higher up the stem are smaller. The flower has 5 shiny yellow petals with orange spots at the bases. The petals may reach 3.6 centimeters in length. At the center are many long, whiskery stamens which may approach 3 centimeters long.

The fruit is a narrow utricle up to 3.5 centimeters long containing many tiny seeds which can be seen to be covered in minute bumps when viewed under magnification.
