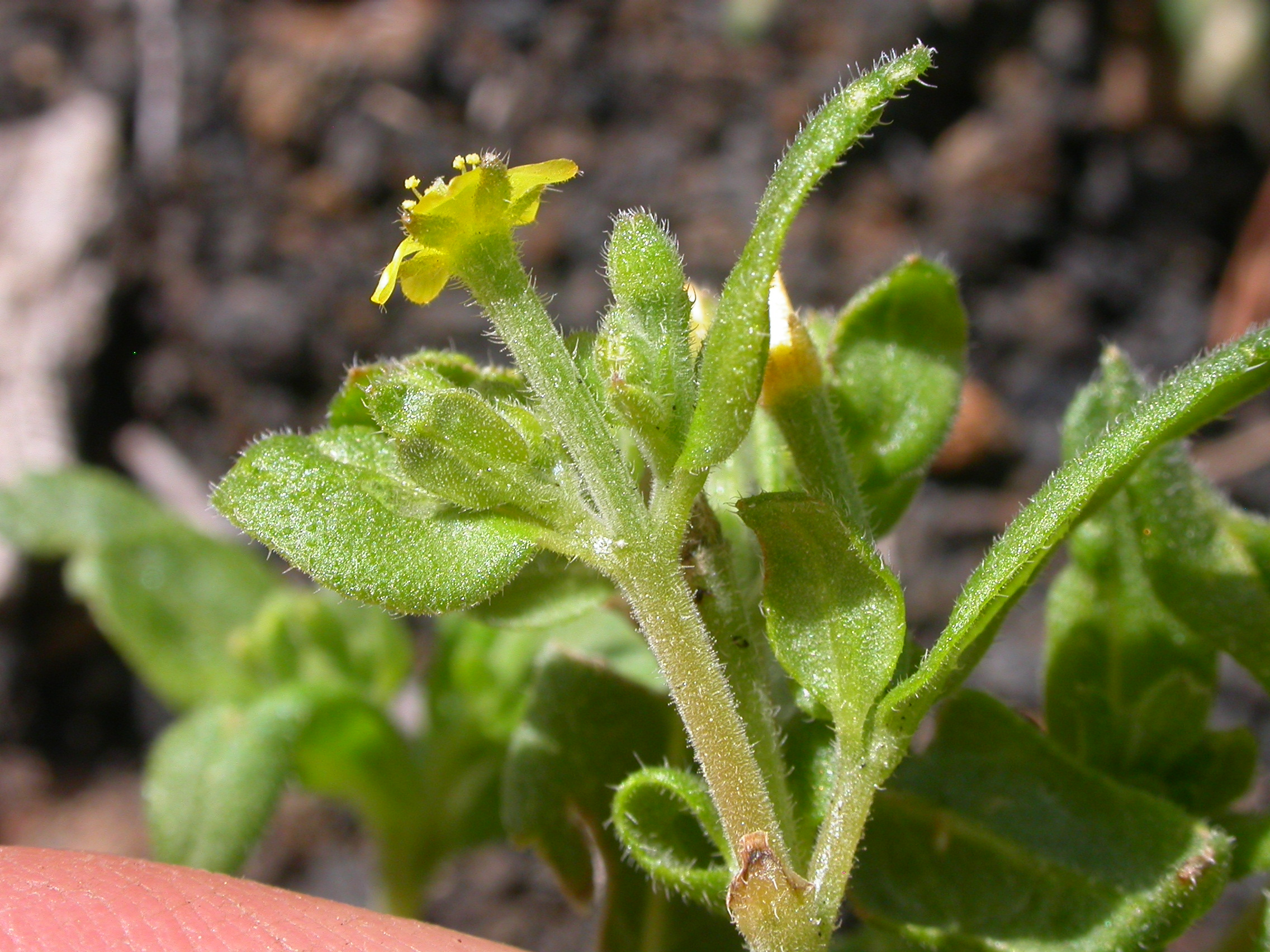

Conservation status
- Secure (NatureServe)

Scientific classification
- Kingdom: Plantae
- Clade: Tracheophytes
- Clade: Angiosperms
- Clade: Eudicots
- Clade: Asterids
- Order: Cornales
- Family: Loasaceae
- Genus: Mentzelia
- Species: M. dispersa

Binomial name
- Mentzelia dispersa S.Watson

Synonyms
- List: Acrolasia albicaulis var. integrifolia; Acrolasia compacta; Acrolasia dispersa; Acrolasia integrifolia; Acrolasia latifolia; Acrolasia pinetorum; Mentzelia albicaulis var. integrifolia; Mentzelia compacta; Mentzelia dispersa var. compacta; Mentzelia dispersa var. latifolia; Mentzelia dispersa var. obtusa; Mentzelia dispersa var. pinetorum; Mentzelia integrifolia; Mentzelia integrifolia var. genuina; Mentzelia latifolia; Mentzelia pinetorum

= Mentzelia dispersa =

Plant species in the stickleaf family

Mentzelia dispersa is a species of flowering plant in the family Loasaceae known by the common name bushy blazingstar. It is native to western North America from British Columbia to California to the Dakotas, where it grows in many types of habitat.

== Description ==
It is an annual herb producing an erect stem up to nearly half a meter in maximum height. The leaves are divided into lobes and teeth, the longest in the basal rosette approaching 10 centimeters long and those higher on the stem reduced in size.

The lightly hairy inflorescence is an open cluster of flowers each with five small, shiny yellow petals a few millimeters long. The fruit is a narrow, straight or curving utricle up to 2.5 centimeters long which contains many tiny angular seeds.
