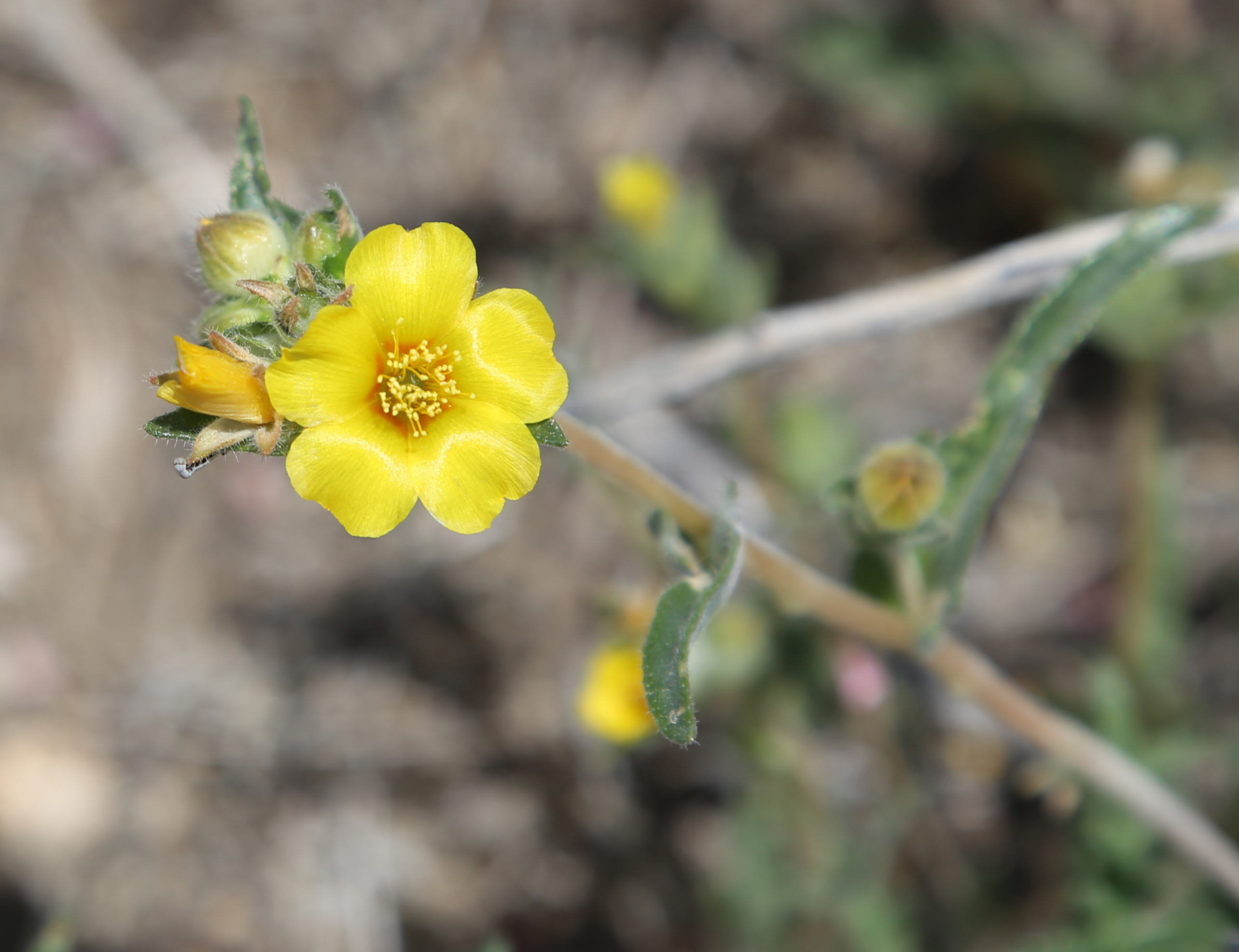

Scientific classification
- Kingdom: Plantae
- Clade: Tracheophytes
- Clade: Angiosperms
- Clade: Eudicots
- Clade: Asterids
- Order: Cornales
- Family: Loasaceae
- Genus: Mentzelia
- Species: M. nitens

Binomial name
- Mentzelia nitens Greene

= Mentzelia nitens =

Species of flowering plant

Mentzelia nitens is a species of flowering plant in the family Loasaceae known by the common names shining blazingstar and Venus blazingstar. It is native to the Mojave Desert and adjacent desert and mountain areas of eastern California and southern Nevada.

== Description ==
It is an annual herb producing an erect, whitish-green, sometimes slightly hairy stem up to about 34 centimeters in maximum height. The lobed leaves are up to 15 centimeters long in the basal rosette, and those higher on the stem are reduced in size and sometimes unlobed.

The inflorescence is a cluster of a few bright, shiny yellow flowers with round, slightly indented petals up to 1.5 centimeters long and sometimes marked with red near the bases. The fruit is a narrow, curving utricle up to 2.6 centimeters in length which contains many minute seeds which are bumpy under magnification.
