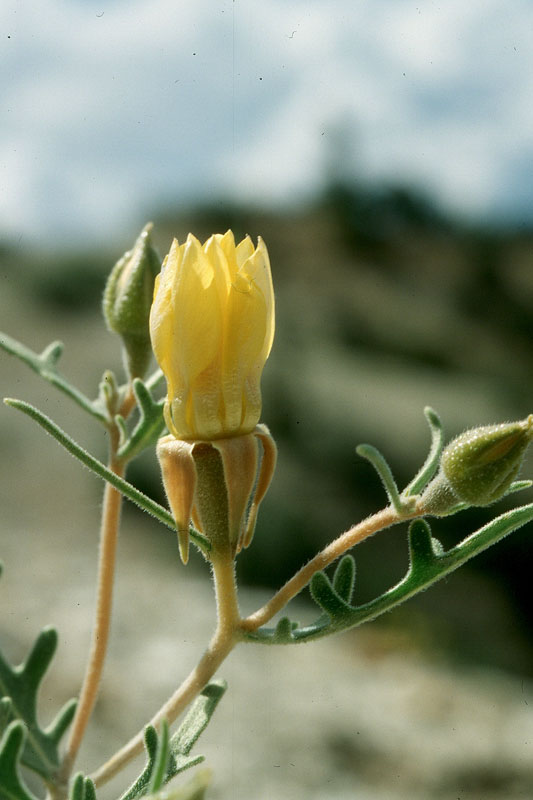

Conservation status
- Critically Imperiled (NatureServe)

Scientific classification
- Kingdom: Plantae
- Clade: Tracheophytes
- Clade: Angiosperms
- Clade: Eudicots
- Clade: Asterids
- Order: Cornales
- Family: Loasaceae
- Genus: Mentzelia
- Species: M. goodrichii

Binomial name
- Mentzelia goodrichii Thorne & S.L.Welsh

= Mentzelia goodrichii =

Species of flowering plant

Mentzelia goodrichii is a rare species of flowering plant in the family Loasaceae known by the common name Goodrich's blazingstar. It is endemic to Utah in the United States, where it is known only from Duchesne County.

This plant is a long-lived perennial herb forming clumps of branching, white stems up to about 30 centimeters tall. The inflorescence contains 1 to 3 flowers, each with 10 large yellow petals. Blooming occurs in July.

This plant is known from five locations on the Badland Cliffs of northeastern Utah, where it grows on the white shale outcrops of the Green River Formation. It grows among pines and Douglas-fir.
