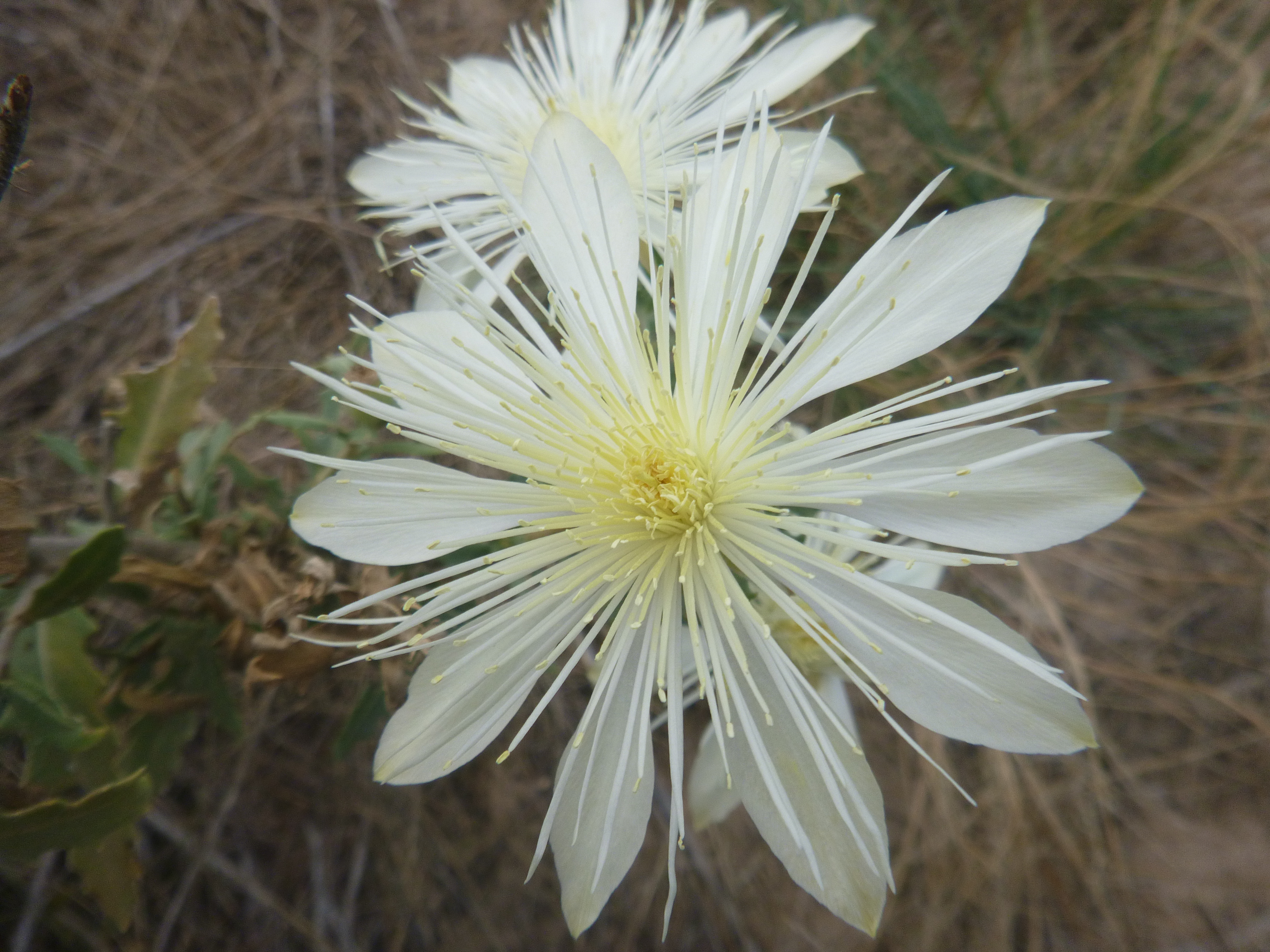
- Close-up of flowers
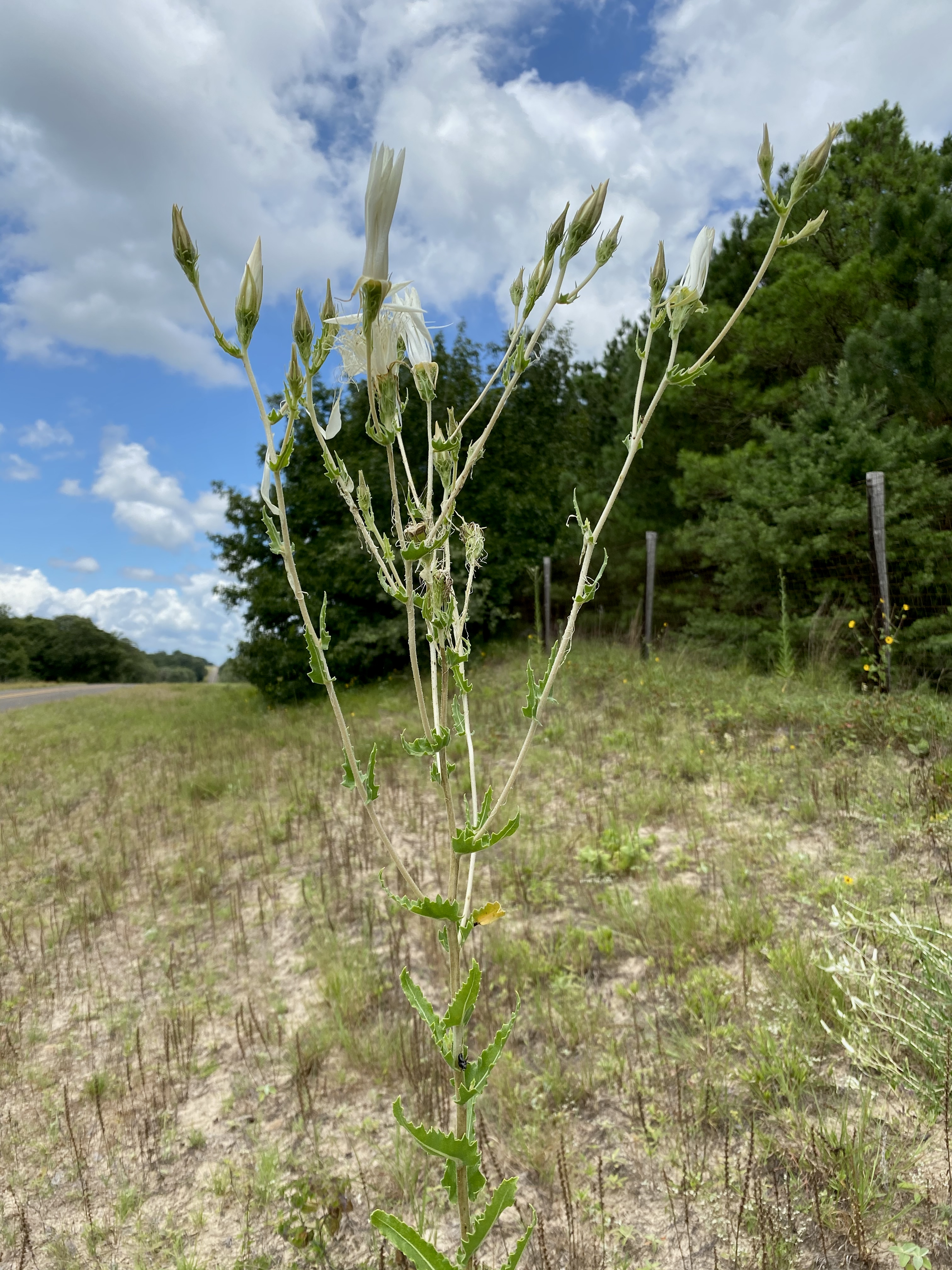
- In Anderson County, Texas

Conservation status
- Secure (NatureServe)

Scientific classification
- Kingdom: Plantae
- Clade: Tracheophytes
- Clade: Angiosperms
- Clade: Eudicots
- Clade: Asterids
- Order: Cornales
- Family: Loasaceae
- Genus: Mentzelia
- Species: M. nuda

Binomial name
- Mentzelia nuda (Pursh) Torr. & A.Gray

Synonyms
- List: Bartonia nuda Pursh; Hesperaster nudus (Pursh) Cockerell; Hesperaster strictus Osterh.; Mentzelia nuda var. integrifolia Kuntze; Mentzelia nuda var. stricta (Osterh.) H.D.Harr.; Mentzelia nuda var. subpinnatifida Kuntze; Mentzelia stricta (Osterh.) G.W.Stevens; Nuttallia nuda (Pursh) Greene; Nuttallia stricta (Osterh.) Greene; Torreya nuda (Pursh) Eaton; Touterea stricta (Osterh.) Rydb.

= Mentzelia nuda =

Species of plant

Mentzelia nuda, the bractless blazingstar, is a species of flowering plant in the family Loasaceae. Native to the plains of the United States east of the Rockies and west of the Mississippi River, it has been introduced to the state of Illinois. It is a perennial reaching 90 cm (3 ft) with cream-colored flowers.

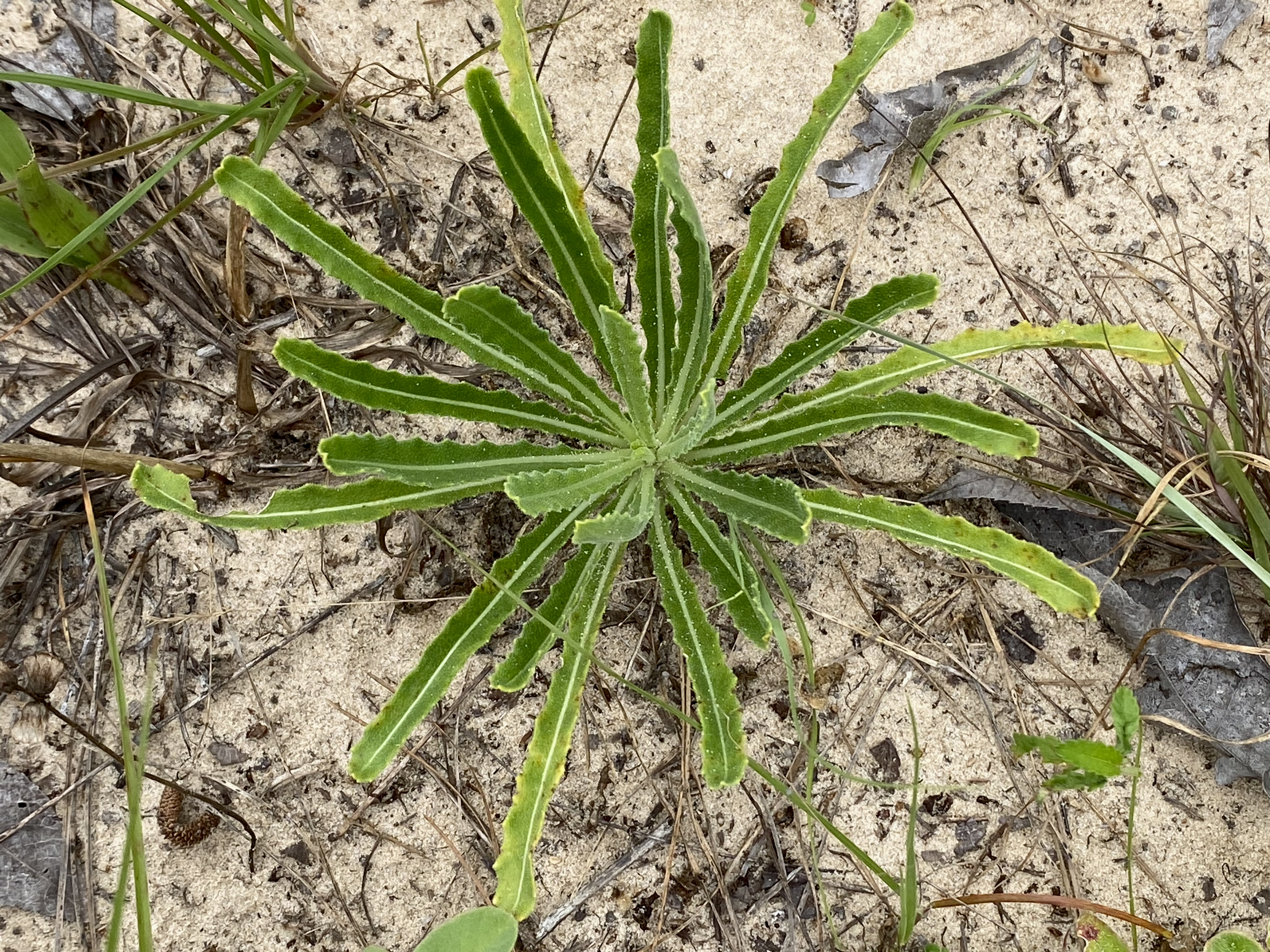
Rosette

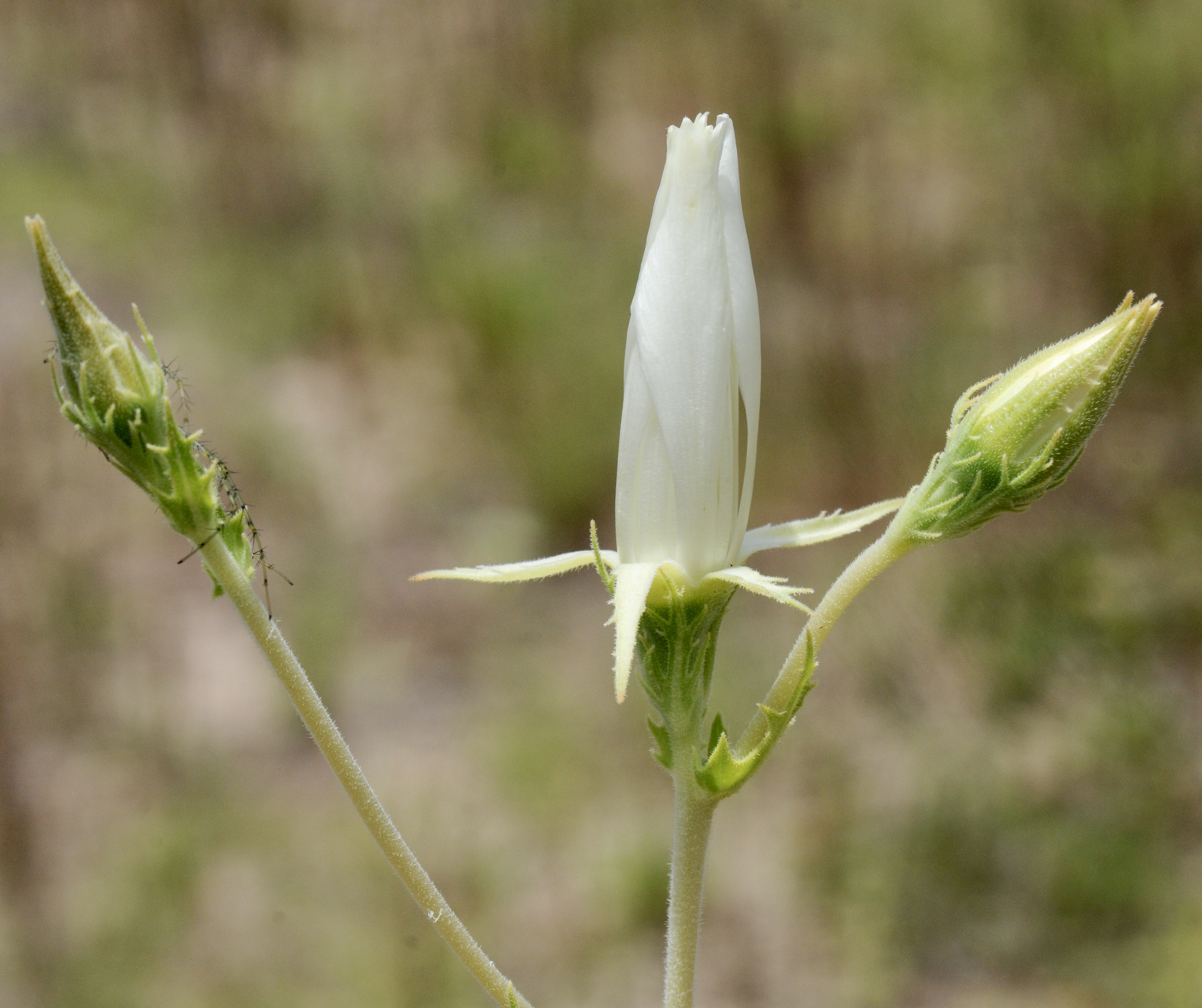
Flower buds
