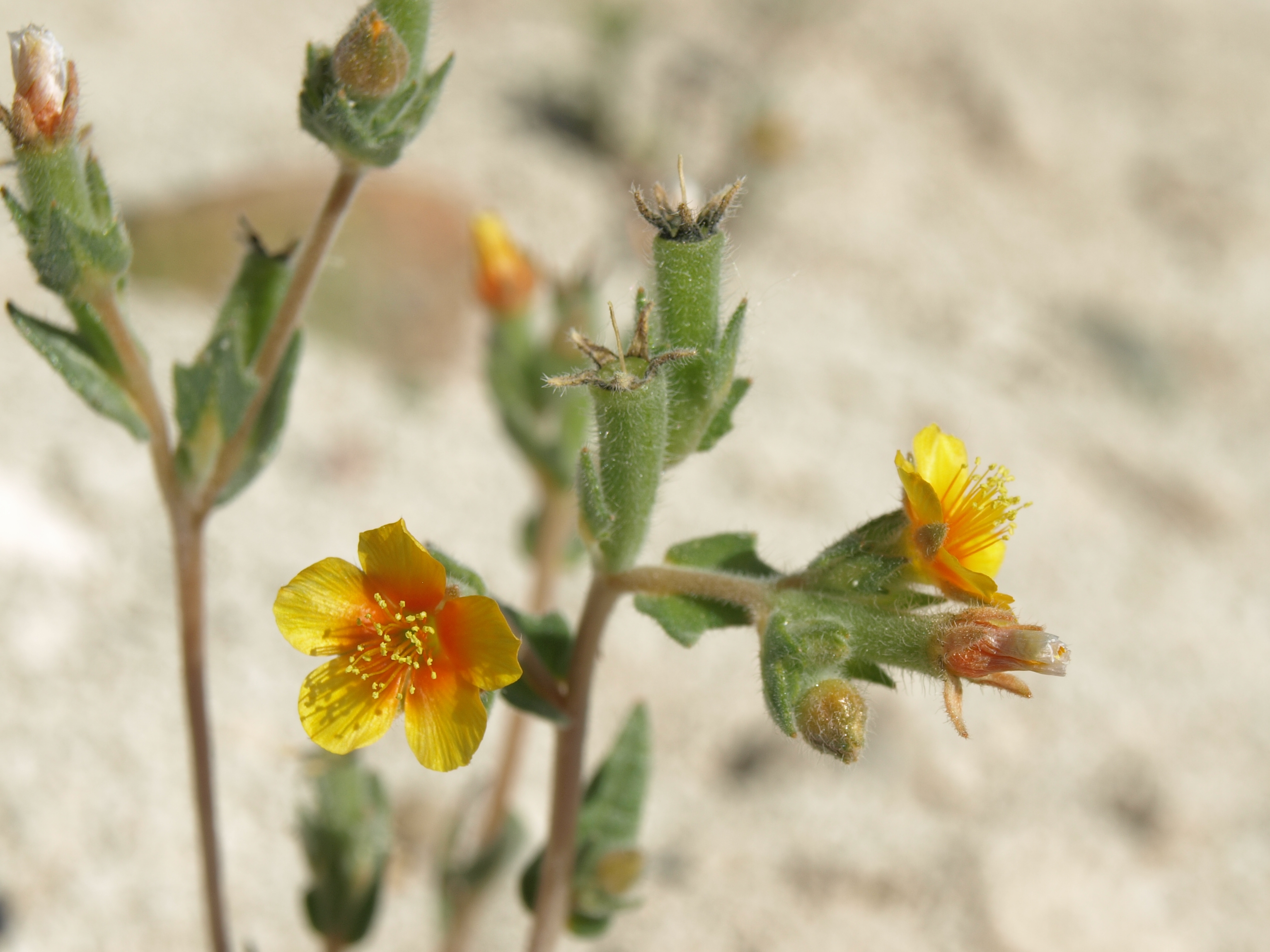

Conservation status
- Apparently Secure (NatureServe)

Scientific classification
- Kingdom: Plantae
- Clade: Embryophytes
- Clade: Tracheophytes
- Clade: Spermatophytes
- Clade: Angiosperms
- Clade: Eudicots
- Clade: Asterids
- Order: Cornales
- Family: Loasaceae
- Genus: Mentzelia
- Species: M. montana

Binomial name
- Mentzelia montana (Davidson) Davidson

Synonyms
- Acrolasia montana Davidson

= Mentzelia montana =

Plant species in the stickleaf family

Mentzelia montana, known by the common name variegated bract blazingstar, is a species of flowering plant in the family Loasaceae.

== Description ==
Mentzelia montana is an annual herb producing an erect stem approaching 0.5 metres (1.6 ft) in maximum height. The leaves are mostly unlobed, the longest in the basal rosette up to 13 centimeters long and those higher on the stem reduced in size.

The inflorescence is a narrow series of clusters of small flowers, each flower accompanied by a single toothed bract with a white base and green tip. The five yellow petals of the flower are up to 7 millimeters long and are sometimes marked with red at the bases.

The fruit is a narrow utricle up to 2 centimeters containing several tiny, angular seeds.

== Taxonomy ==
In 1906 the botanist Anstruther Davidson described a new species which he named Acrolasia montana. However, the genus Acrolasia is considered a synonym of Mentzelia, and Davidson moved it to that genus in 1923. Together with its genus it is classified in the Loasaceae family and has no subspecies.

The Botanical Latin specific epithet montana refers to mountains or coming from mountains.

== Distribution and habitat ==
The plant is native to much of western North America including the western United States and northern Mexico. It is a member of the flora in many types of habitat, including coniferous forests, chaparral, sagebrush scrub, and deserts.
