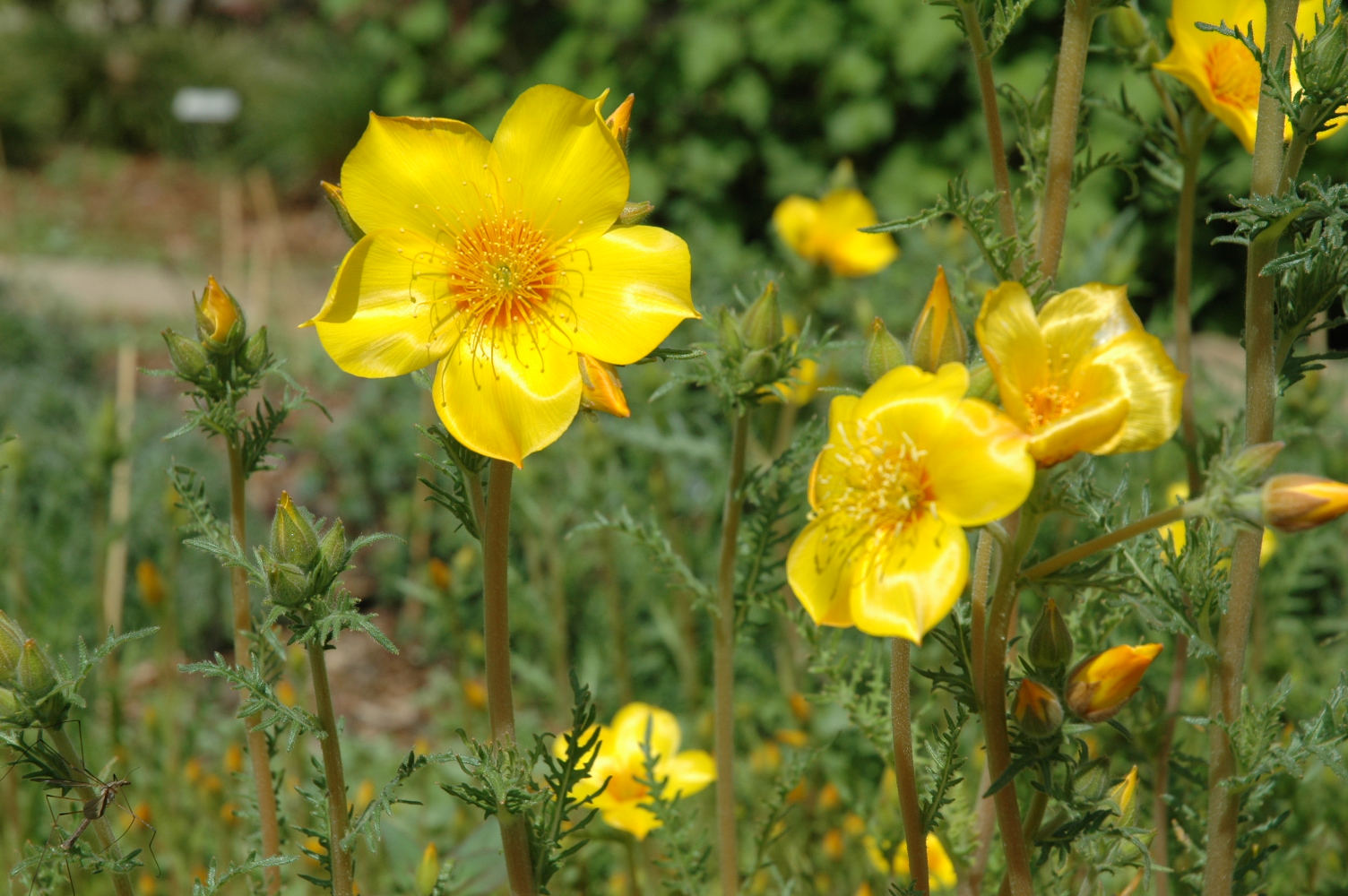
- Mentzelia lindleyi

Scientific classification
- Kingdom: Plantae
- Clade: Tracheophytes
- Clade: Angiosperms
- Clade: Eudicots
- Clade: Asterids
- Order: Cornales
- Family: Loasaceae
- Genus: Mentzelia; L.

Species
- Some 60-70, see text

Synonyms
- Acrolasia C.Presl; Bartonia (non Muhl. ex Willd.: preoccupied)

= Mentzelia =

Genus of plants

Mentzelia is a genus of about 100 species of flowering plants in the family Loasaceae, native to the Americas. The genus comprises annual, biennial, and perennial herbaceous plants and a few shrubs.

They are commonly called blazing stars or stickleafs; other names include evening stars and moonflowers.

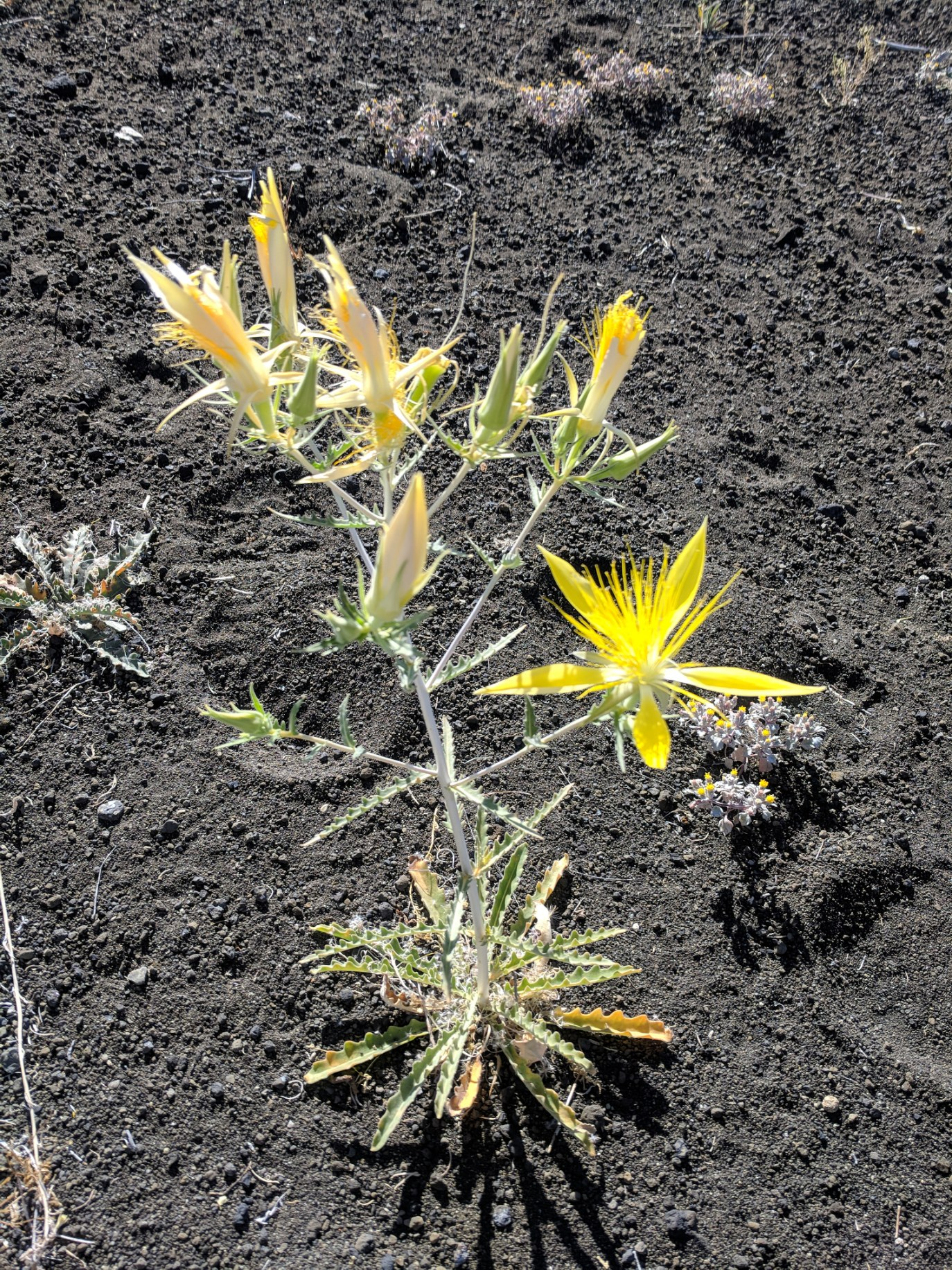
Mentzelia laevicaulis photographed at Mono Lake, CA

== Species ==
According to Plants of the World Online there are 100 species in this genus.

- Mentzelia adhaerens Benth.
- Mentzelia affinis Greene
- Mentzelia albescens (Gillies ex Arn.) Benth. & Hook.f. ex Griseb.
- Mentzelia albicaulis (Douglas ex Hook.) Douglas ex Torr. & A.Gray
- Mentzelia angurate Weigend
- Mentzelia arborescens Urb. & Gilg
- Mentzelia argillicola N.H.Holmgren & P.K.Holmgren
- Mentzelia argillosa J.Darl.
- Mentzelia aspera L.
- Mentzelia asperula Wooton & Standl.
- Mentzelia candelariae H.J.Thomps. & Prigge
- Mentzelia canyonensis J.J.Schenk, W.C.Hodgs. & L.Hufford
- Mentzelia chrysantha Engelm.
- Mentzelia collomiae Christy
- Mentzelia congesta (Nutt.) Torr. & A.Gray
- Mentzelia conspicua Todsen
- Mentzelia conzattii Greenm.
- Mentzelia crocea Kellogg
- Mentzelia cronquistii H.J.Thomps. & Prigge
- Mentzelia decapetala (Sims) Urb.
- Mentzelia densa Greene
- Mentzelia desertorum (Davidson) H.J.Thomps. & J.E.Roberts
- Mentzelia dispersa S.Watson
- Mentzelia eremophila (Jeps.) H.J.Thomps. & J.E.Roberts
- Mentzelia filifolia J.J.Schenk & L.Hufford
- Mentzelia floridana Nutt.
- Mentzelia flumensevera (N.H.Holmgren & P.K.Holmgren) J.J.Schenk & L.Hufford
- Mentzelia goodrichii Thorne & S.L.Welsh
- Mentzelia gracilenta Torr. & A.Gray
- Mentzelia gypsophila B.L.Turner
- Mentzelia heterosepala Weigend & E.Rodr.
- Mentzelia hirsutissima S.Watson
- Mentzelia hispida Willd.
- Mentzelia holmgreniorum J.J.Schenk & L.Hufford
- Mentzelia hualapaiensis J.J.Schenk, W.C.Hodgs. & L.Hufford
- Mentzelia humilis (Urb. & Gilg) J.Darl.
- Mentzelia incisa Urb. & Gilg
- Mentzelia integra (M.E.Jones) Tidestr.
- Mentzelia involucrata S.Watson
- Mentzelia inyoensis H.J.Thomps. & Prigge
- Mentzelia isolata Gentry
- Mentzelia jonesii (Urb. & Gilg) H.J.Thomps. & J.E.Roberts
- Mentzelia laciniata (Rydb.) J.Darl.
- Mentzelia laevicaulis (Douglas ex Hook.) Torr. & A.Gray
- Mentzelia lagarosa (K.H.Thorne) J.J.Schenk & L.Hufford
- Mentzelia leucophylla Brandegee
- Mentzelia librina (K.H.Thorne & F.J.Sm.) J.J.Schenk & L.Hufford
- Mentzelia lindheimeri Urb. & Gilg
- Mentzelia lindleyi Torr. & A.Gray
- Mentzelia longiloba J.Darl.
- Mentzelia marginata (Osterh.) H.J.Thomps. & Prigge
- Mentzelia memorabilis N.H.Holmgren & P.K.Holmgren
- Mentzelia mexicana H.J.Thomps. & Zavort.
- Mentzelia micrantha (Hook. & Arn.) Torr. & A.Gray
- Mentzelia mollis M.Peck
- Mentzelia monoensis Brokaw & L.Hufford
- Mentzelia montana (Davidson) Davidson
- Mentzelia multicaulis (Osterh.) J.Darl.
- Mentzelia multiflora (Nutt.) A.Gray
- Mentzelia nesiotes (I.M.Johnst.) Brokaw & J.J.Schenk
- Mentzelia nitens Greene
- Mentzelia nuda (Pursh) Torr. & A.Gray
- Mentzelia obscura H.J.Thomps. & J.E.Roberts
- Mentzelia oligosperma Nutt. ex Sims
- Mentzelia oreophila J.Darl.
- Mentzelia pachyrhiza I.M.Johnst.
- Mentzelia packardiae Glad
- Mentzelia paradoxensis J.J.Schenk & L.Hufford
- Mentzelia parvifolia Urb. & Gilg ex Kurtz
- Mentzelia pattersonii B.L.Turner
- Mentzelia pectinata Kellogg
- Mentzelia perennis Wooton
- Mentzelia polita A.Nelson
- Mentzelia procera (Wooton & Standl.) J.J.Schenk & L.Hufford
- Mentzelia pterosperma Eastw.
- Mentzelia puberula J.Darl.
- Mentzelia pumila Torr. & A.Gray
- Mentzelia ravenii H.J.Thomps. & J.E.Roberts
- Mentzelia reflexa Coville
- Mentzelia reverchonii (Urb. & Gilg) H.J.Thomps. & Zavort.
- Mentzelia rhizomata Reveal
- Mentzelia rusbyi Wooton
- Mentzelia saxicola H.J.Thomps. & Zavort.
- Mentzelia scabra Kunth
- Mentzelia sericea Weigend
- Mentzelia shultziorum Prigge
- Mentzelia sivinskii J.J.Schenk & L.Hufford
- Mentzelia solieri (Gay) Urb. & Gilg
- Mentzelia speciosa Osterh.
- Mentzelia springeri (Standl.) Tidestr.
- Mentzelia strictissima (Wooton & Standl.) J.Darl.
- Mentzelia texana Urb. & Gilg
- Mentzelia thompsonii Glad
- Mentzelia tiehmii N.H.Holmgren & P.K.Holmgren
- Mentzelia todiltoensis N.D.Atwood & S.L.Welsh
- Mentzelia torreyi A.Gray
- Mentzelia tricuspis A.Gray
- Mentzelia tridentata (Davidson) H.J.Thomps. & J.E.Roberts
- Mentzelia uintahensis (N.H.Holmgren & P.K.Holmgren) J.J.Schenk & L.Hufford
- Mentzelia veatchiana Kellogg
