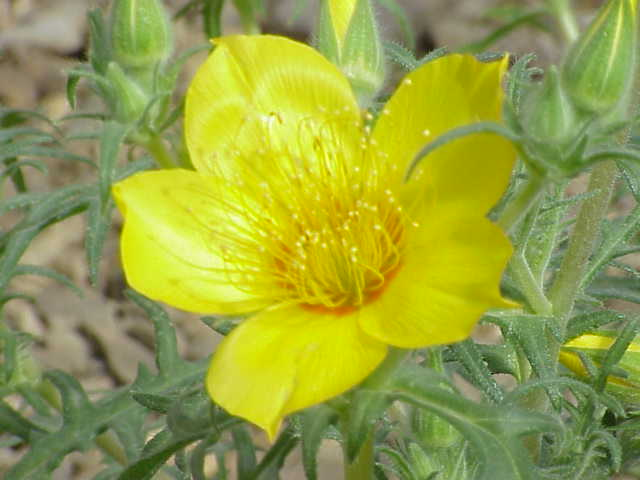

Conservation status
- Vulnerable (NatureServe)

Scientific classification
- Kingdom: Plantae
- Clade: Tracheophytes
- Clade: Angiosperms
- Clade: Eudicots
- Clade: Asterids
- Order: Cornales
- Family: Loasaceae
- Genus: Mentzelia
- Species: M. pumila

Binomial name
- Mentzelia pumila Torr. & A.Gray

Synonyms
- List: Bartonia pumila; Hesperaster pumila; Mentzelia pumila var. genuina; Mentzelia wrightii; Nuttallia pumila; Touterea pumila

= Mentzelia pumila =

Plant species in the family

Mentzelia pumila, (dwarf mentzelia, desert blazing star, blazing star, bullet stickleaf, golden blazing star, yellow mentzelia, evening star, moonflower, Wyoming stickleaf, etc.) is a biennial wildflower found in the western United States and northwestern Mexico from Montana and North Dakota, south to Sonora and Chihuahua. It is a blazingstar and a member of the genus Mentzelia, the stickleafs; member species are also called "evening stars", but some stickleafs close at sunset, as does M. pumila.

Leaves of Mentzelia pumila are long, very narrow, and serrated-pinnate-like; also medium to light grayish green; an individual plant in an opportune site can be 1.5–2.5 feet (1 m) in height. The flowers are a bright, glossy medium yellow, and the major petals are variable, sometimes 5 major, 5 minor; also 4 and 4.

Mentzelia pumila is covered in minute elaborations known as trichomes, which pierce and trap insects that land on it. A species of aphid, Macrosyphum mentzeliae colonises the plant and is afforded protection, since its main predator, the ladybird beetle, is unable to avoid the trichomes.

== Uses ==
The root is a laxative. The Zuni people insert this plant into the rectum as a suppository for constipation. The plant is also used to whip children to make them strong so they could hold on to a horse without falling.
