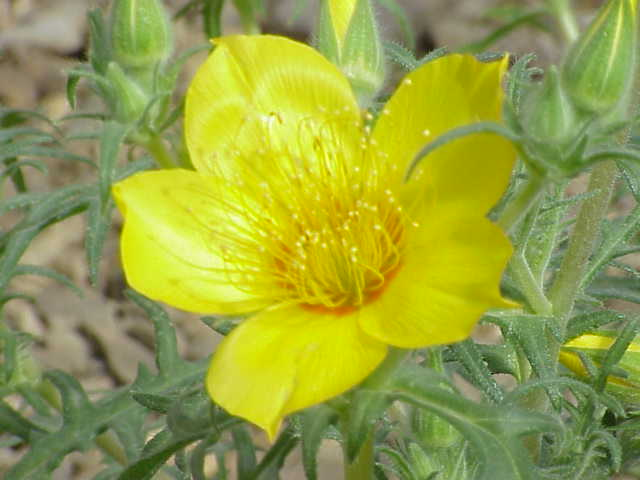

Scientific classification
- Kingdom: Plantae
- Clade: Tracheophytes
- Clade: Angiosperms
- Clade: Eudicots
- Clade: Asterids
- Order: Cornales
- Family: Loasaceae
- Genus: Mentzelia
- Species: M. lindleyi

Binomial name
- Mentzelia lindleyi Torr. & A.Gray

= Mentzelia lindleyi =

Species of flowering plant

Mentzelia lindleyi, commonly known as golden bartonia, Lindley's blazingstar, evening star, or blazing star, is an annual wildflower of western North America.

== Distribution and habitat ==
The plant is found in the California Coast Ranges, San Francisco Bay Area, and San Joaquin Valley of California; and in Arizona.

Habitats it is found in include Coastal sage scrub and Southern oak woodland.

== Description ==
Mentzelia lindleyi grows to 1–3 feet (0.30–0.91 m) tall.

The plant produces bright yellow flowers, 3 inches in diameter, with five petals. One plant may have 25-35 flowers.

== Cultivation ==
As an annual wildflower, Mentzelia lindleyi is cultivated as an ornamental plant in traditional flower beds, drought tolerant and habitat gardens, and desert rock gardens. It is a pollinator plant in wildlife gardens. The plant prefers sandy soil in gardens.
