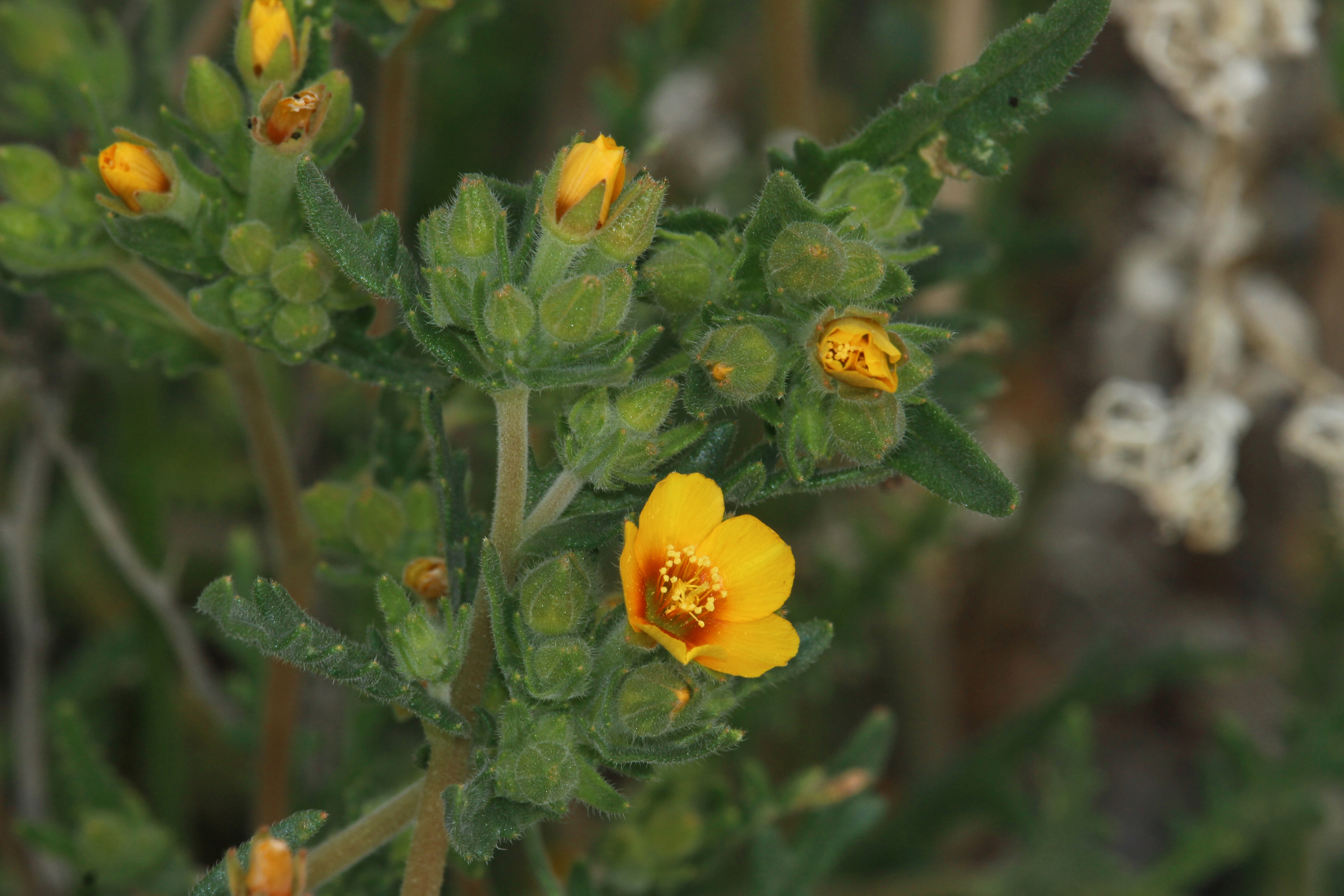

Conservation status
- Secure (NatureServe)

Scientific classification
- Kingdom: Plantae
- Clade: Embryophytes
- Clade: Tracheophytes
- Clade: Spermatophytes
- Clade: Angiosperms
- Clade: Eudicots
- Clade: Asterids
- Order: Cornales
- Family: Loasaceae
- Genus: Mentzelia
- Species: M. veatchiana

Binomial name
- Mentzelia veatchiana Kellogg

Synonyms
- Acrolasia veatchiana; Mentzelia albicaulis var. veatchiana; Mentzelia gracilenta var. veatchiana

= Mentzelia veatchiana =

Plant species in the stickleaf family

Mentzelia veatchiana is a species of flowering plant in the family Loasaceae known by the common name Veatch's blazingstar.

It is native to the western United States from Oregon and southern Idaho, south through California and Arizona, to northwestern Mexico in Baja California and Sonora. It grows in many types of habitat, from grassland to chaparral scrub, woodland, and deserts, mostly below 8,000 feet (2,400 m) elevation.

== Description ==
Mentzelia veatchiana is a branched hairy annual herb growing erect to a maximum height near 45 centimeters. The leaves are up to 18 centimeters long. The basal leaves are lobed and may be stalked. The stem leaves are sessile and generally lobed or toothed.

The inflorescence is a cluster of flowers on the ends of stalks. The bracts are mostly ovate with teeth or lobes but sometimes entire. Sepals are 1–5 millimetres (0.04–0.20 in). The orange to yellow petals are generally 4–7 millimetres (0.2–0.3 in) with red to orange bases.

The fruit is a utricle roughly 1 to 3 centimeters long which contains many tiny angular seeds.

== Taxonomy ==
In 1861 Albert Kellogg described a new species in the Mentzelia genus which he named Mentzelia veatchiana. Together with its genus it is classified in the Loasaceae family and has three homotypic synonyms.

Table of Synonyms
| Name | Year | Rank |
|---|---|---|
| Acrolasia veatchiana (Kellogg) Rydb. | 1903 | species |
| Mentzelia albicaulis var. veatchiana (Kellogg) Urb. & Gilg | 1900 | variety |
| Mentzelia gracilenta var. veatchiana (Kellogg) Jeps. | 1925 | variety |

== Range ==
Veatch's blazingstar is native to the far western United States and northwestern Mexico. In the US it grows in Oregon, California, Nevada, and Arizona. In Mexico the species is found in just Baja California and Sonora.
