= Stinging plant =

Plant with hairs (trichomes) on its leaves or stems

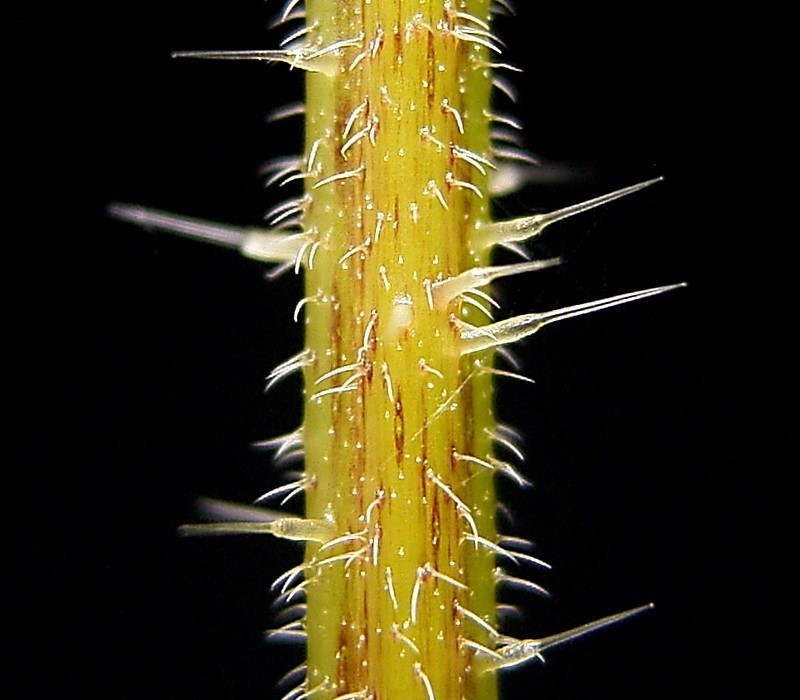
Stinging hairs of Urtica dioica (stinging nettle)

A stinging plant or a plant with stinging hairs is a plant with hairs (trichomes) on its leaves or stems that are capable of injecting substances that cause pain or irritation.

Other plants, such as opuntias, have hairs or spines that cause mechanical irritation, but do not inject chemicals. Stinging hairs occur particularly in the families Urticaceae, Loasaceae, Boraginaceae (subfamily Hydrophylloideae) and Euphorbiaceae. Such hairs have been shown to deter grazing mammals, but are no more effective against insect attack than non-stinging hairs. Many plants with stinging hairs have the word "nettle" in their English name, but may not be related to "true nettles" (the genus Urtica).

Though several unrelated families of plants have stinging hairs, their structure is generally similar. A solid base supports a single elongated cell with a brittle tip. When the tip is broken, the exposed sharp point penetrates the skin and pressure injects toxins. The precise chemicals involved in causing pain and irritation are not yet fully understood.

== Structure and function of stinging hairs ==
Structure of a stinging hair of Urtica dioica

Stiff hairs or trichomes without the ability to inject irritating compounds occur on the leaves and stems of many plants. They appear to deter feeding insects to some degree by impeding movement and restricting access to the surface of the stem or leaf. Some plants have glandular hairs, either as well as non-glandular hairs or instead of them. Glandular hairs have regions of tissue that produce secretions of secondary metabolites. These chemical substances can repel or poison feeding insects.

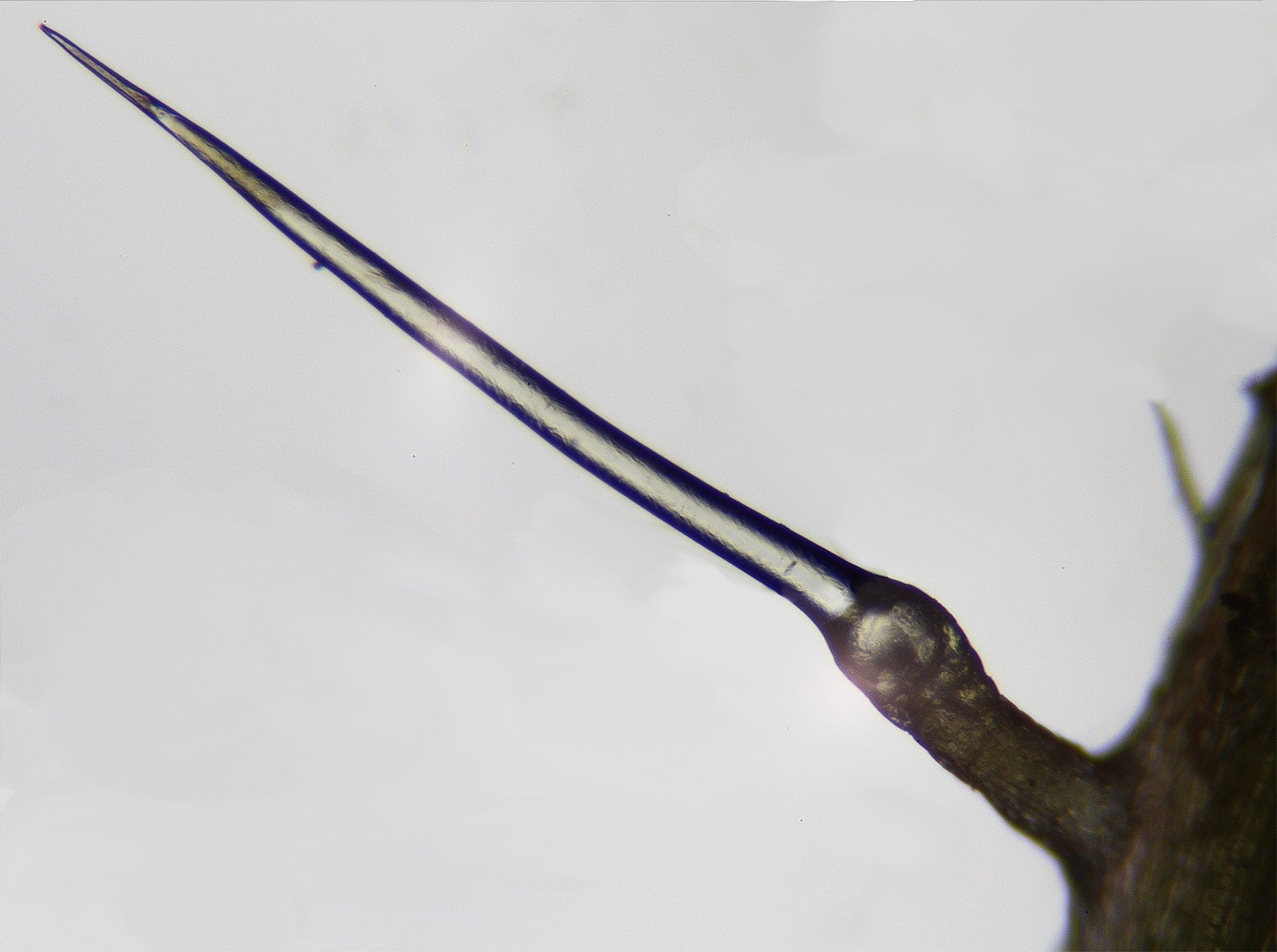
stinging hair of Urtica dioica, 40x magnified

Stinging hairs may be defined as those with ability to inject a chemical substance through the skin of an animal causing irritation or pain. Since some glandular hairs can cause irritation merely by contact, the difference between "stinging hairs" and "irritating hairs" is not always clear. For example, the hairs of Mucuna species are described in both ways. Some species of Mucuna have sharply tipped hairs, in which the upper part easily breaks off, whereas other species have hairs that are blunter. In those subspecies of Urtica dioica that have stinging hairs (stinging nettles), these also have a point that easily breaks off, allowing the irritants in the cell below to enter through the skin. Being stung in this way has been shown to deter grazing mammals, such as rabbits, and even large herbivores such as cows. Many plant species respond to physical damage by producing a higher density of trichomes of all kinds.

The general structure of a stinging hair is very similar in all the families of plants that possess them (except Tragia and Dalechampia). A multicellular base supports a single long thin cell, typically 1–8 mm long, with a brittle tip that easily breaks to form a sharp point that can penetrate skin. Stinging hairs of Urtica species have been studied in some detail. Each hair contains a fine tube, stiffened with calcium carbonate (calcified) at its base and with silica (silicified) at its tip. In Urtica thunbergiana, individual hairs contain around 4 nanolitres (4×10^{−6} ml) of fluid. The silicified tip breaks off on contact, and the resulting fine point pierces the skin. Pressure forces the fluid out of the hair.

Different toxins may be involved. The stinging hairs of Tragia spp, notably Tragia volubilis, a South American member of the Euphorbiaceae, are capable of injecting a crystal of calcium oxalate. The stinging sensation is initially caused by the mechanical entry of the stiff hair into the skin, but is then intensified by the effect of the oxalate.

Concentration of toxins in the fluid of the stinging hairs of U. thunbergiana
| Toxin | Concentration |
|---|---|
| Histamine | 0.53% |
| Tartaric acid | 1.44% |
| Oxalic acid | 0.12% |

The effects of the stinging hairs of Urtica species, particularly some subspecies of Urtica dioica, have been attributed to a number of substances, including histamine, acetylcholine, serotonin, and formic acid. Histamine is a component of the stinging hairs of other Urtica species (e.g. U. urens and U. parviflora) and of Cnidoscolus urens and Laportea species. In vertebrates, histamine is a neurotransmitter. When it is released naturally, inflammation of the skin results, causing pain and itching. Injection of histamine by stinging hairs has been considered to have the same effect.

This traditional interpretation was challenged in 2006 by research on Urtica thunbergiana, the main species of Urtica present in Taiwan. In tests on rats, the long-lasting pain caused by stings was attributed to oxalic and tartaric acid, although a synergistic effect of the other components of the stinging hairs was not ruled out. Fu et al. concluded that "stinging hairs, although studied for a long time, are still mysterious, particularly concerning the mechanism of the skin reaction after being stung."

== Plants with stinging hairs ==
=== Urtica ===
Many plants with stinging hairs belong to the genus Urtica. Between twenty-four and thirty-nine species of flowering plants of the genus Urtica in the family Urticaceae fall into this category, with a cosmopolitan though mainly temperate distribution. They are mostly herbaceous perennial plants, but some are annual and a few are shrubby. The most prominent member of the genus Urtica is the stinging nettle, Urtica dioica, native to Europe, Africa, Asia, and North America.

=== Other Urticaceae ===
The family Urticaceae also contains some other plants with stinging hairs that are not members of the genus Urtica. These include:

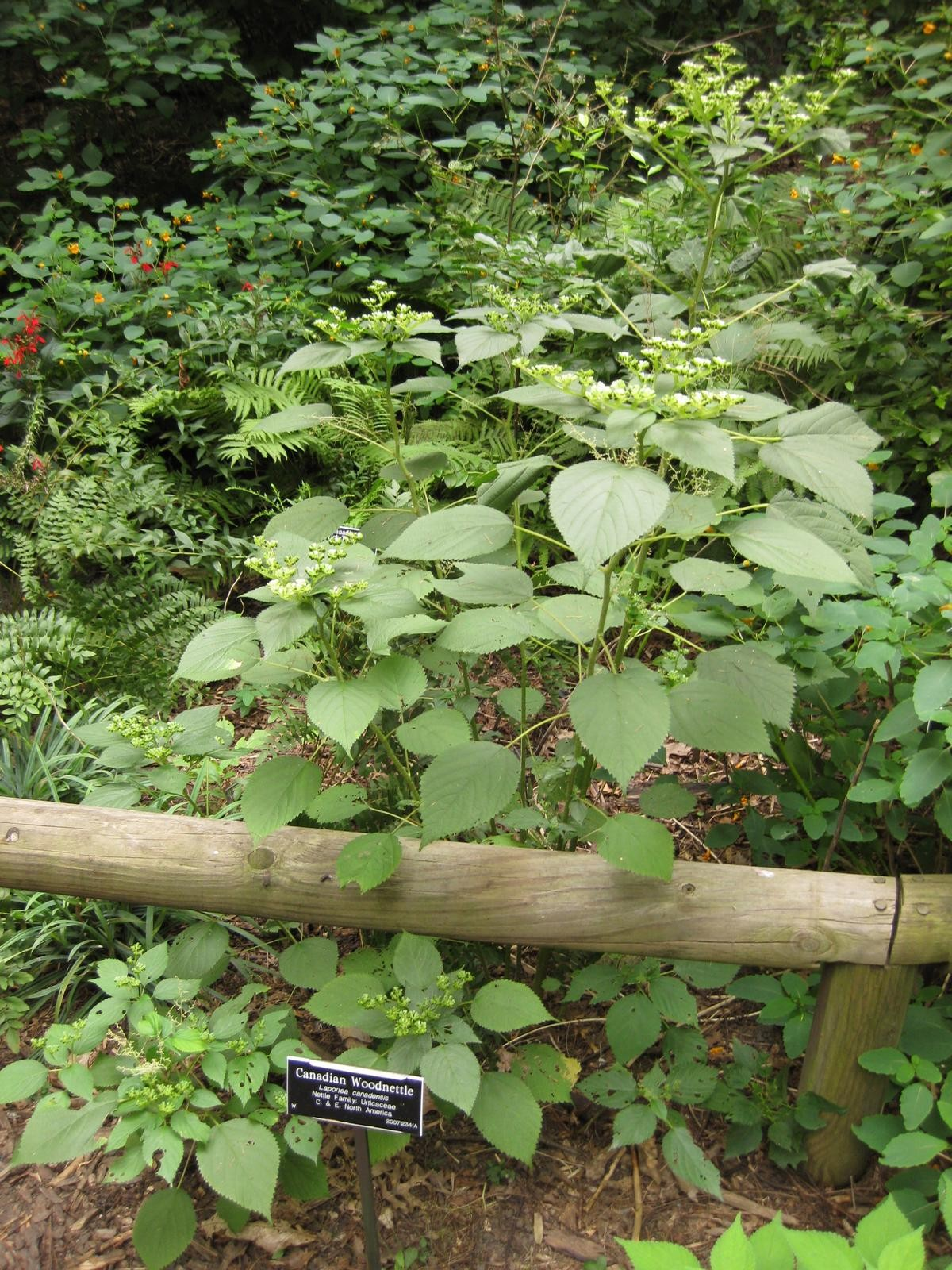
Laportea canadensis in cultivation

- Dendrocnide spp.
  - Dendrocnide excelsa (giant stinging tree)
  - Dendrocnide moroides (gympie-gympie)
  - Dendrocnide peltata (stinging tree, jelaton)
- Girardinia diversifolia (synonym: G. leschenaultiana) (Nilgiri nettle, Himalayan giant nettle), source of allo fibre
- Laportea canadensis (wood nettle)
- Urera spp.
  - Urera baccifera (nettle tree)
  - Urera tenax

=== Other families ===
There are also plants with stinging hairs that are unrelated to the Urticaceae:

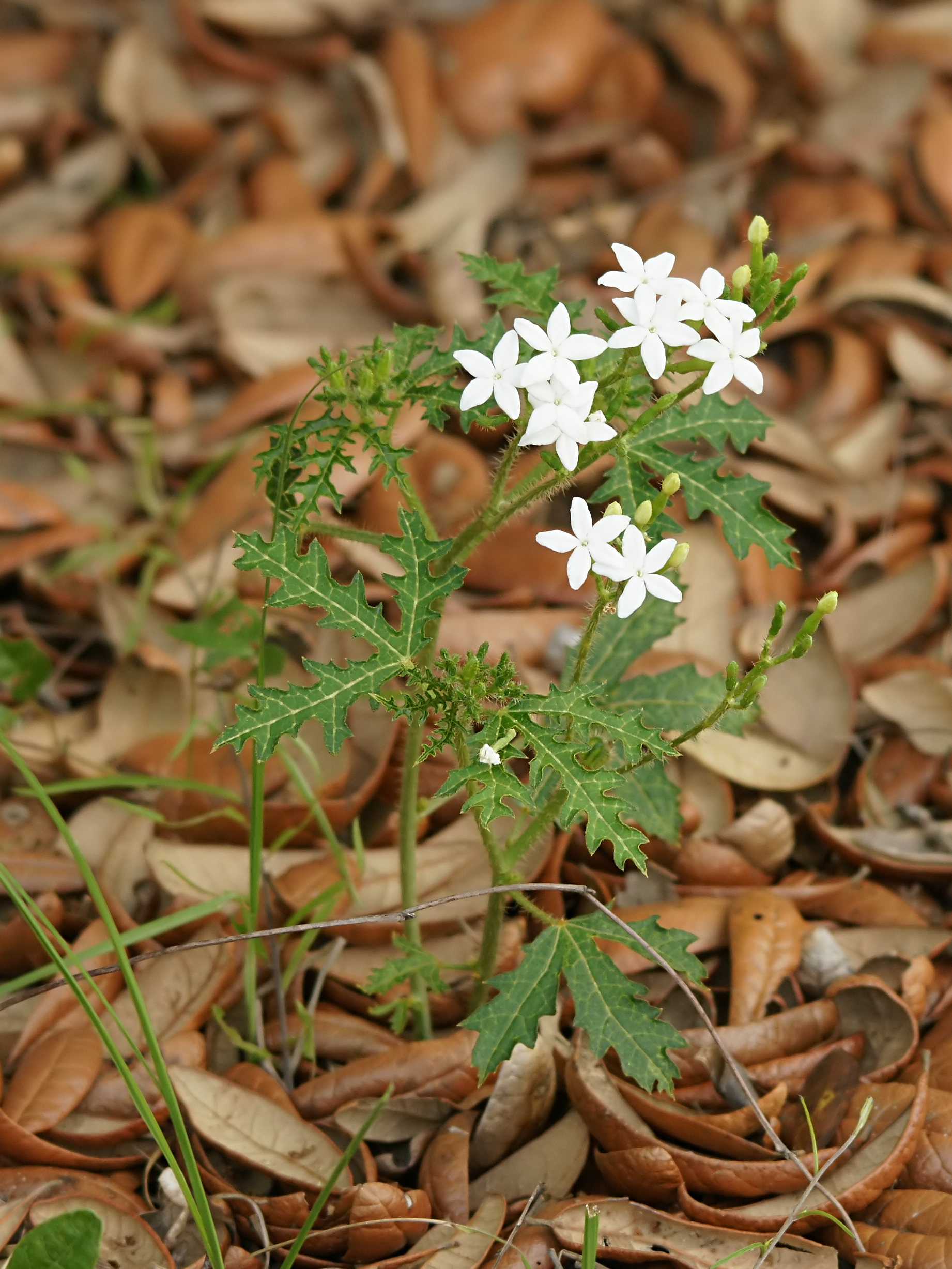
Cnidoscolus urens, one of a number of species called "bull nettle" or "mala mujer"

- Boraginaceae: Hydrophylloideae
  - Phacelia malvifolia (stinging phacelia)
  - Wigandia spp.
- Euphorbiaceae
  - Cnidoscolus spp.
    - Cnidoscolus stimulosus (bull nettle or spurge nettle)
    - Cnidoscolus urens (stinging spurge or mala mujer)
  - Croton ciliato-glandulosus (ciega-vista)
  - Dalechampia spp.
  - Tragia spp. (noseburn)
- Fabaceae
  - Mucuna spp.
    - Mucuna pruriens (cowhage)
- Loasaceae
  - Loasa spp.
  - Caiophora spp.
  - Cevallia spp.

== Toxicity ==
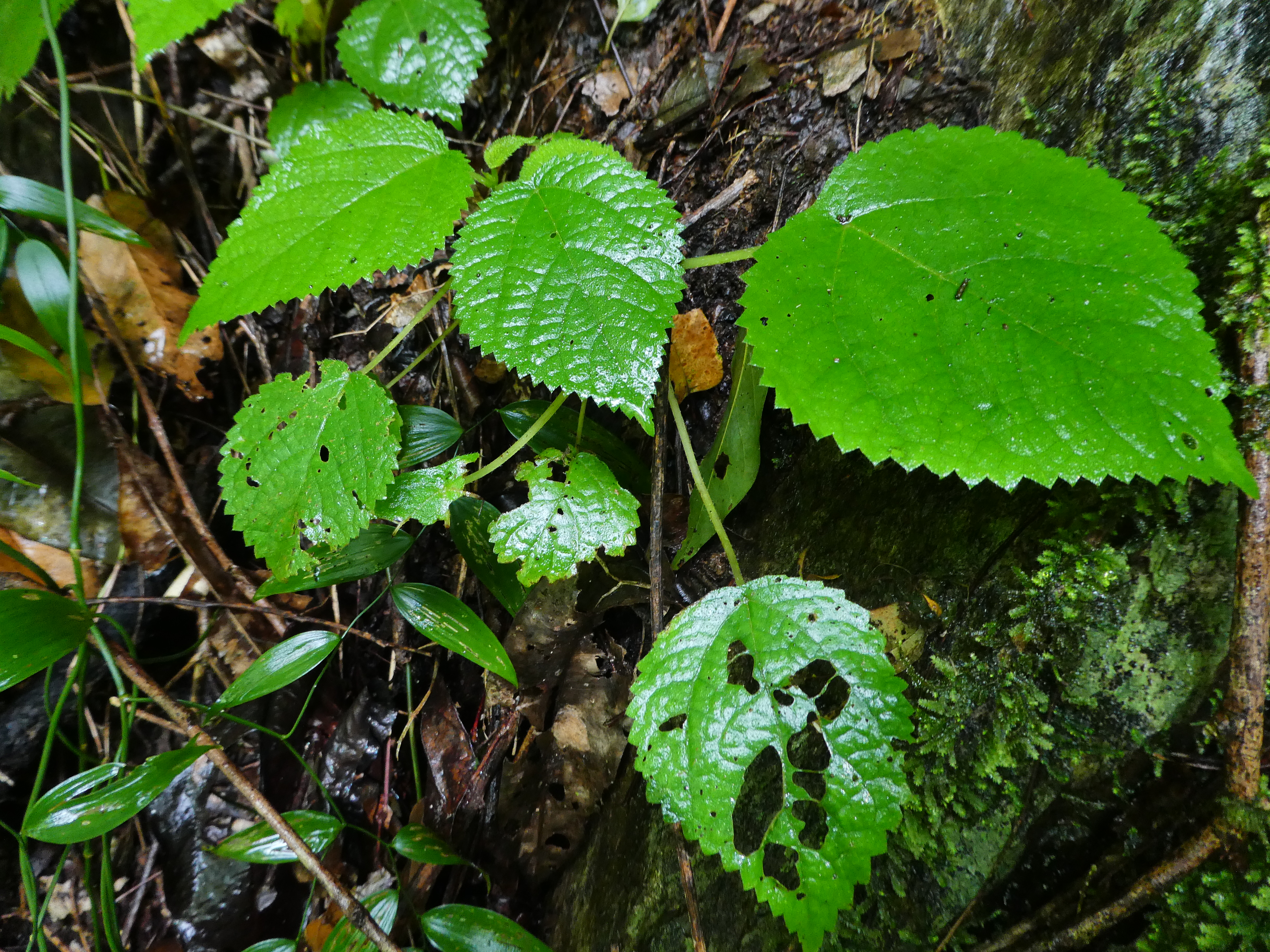
Dendrocnide moroides, purported to be the most painful of all stinging plants

Though plants with stinging hairs can cause pain and acute urticaria, only a few are seriously harmful. The genus Dendrocnide (stinging trees) has been said to cause the most pain, particularly the Australian Dendrocnide moroides (gympie-gympie), although other sources describe the pain of stinging trees as only differing from that of nettles in terms of persistence rather than severity. There are reports of dogs and horses being killed, and once of a human death. The researcher Marina Hurley reports being hospitalized after being stung by a dead leaf. Deaths are probably due to heart failure caused by pain and shock. Urtica ferox (tree nettle or ongaonga) is endemic to New Zealand. One recorded human death is known: a lightly clad young man died five hours after walking through a dense patch.

After cooking, some plants with stinging hairs, such as Urtica dioica (stinging nettle), are eaten as vegetables.

== Stem, root, and stomata of Urtica dioica ==
Urtica dioica displays characteristics of a herbaceous perennial plant. The stems shows a visible vascular bundle and identifies the plant as dicot when viewing the cross-section at 40x magnification due to its ring shape surrounding the central pith.

The leaf cell images presented in the gallery, taken at 10x and 40x, shows presence of stomata within the tissue, along with surrounding guard cells, which enable gas exchange.

The cross-section shows visible epidermis lining the outer layer of the root. Along with a middle cortex containing collenchyma and parenchyma cells within the inner pith. The xylem are located in the center of the cross-section, while the phloem are separated by the vascular cambium.

== Taxonomy ==
- Kingdom: Plantae
- Clade: Tracheophytes
- Clade: Angiosperms
- Clade: Eudicots
- Order: Rosales
- Family: Urticaceae
- Genus: Urtica
- Species: U. dioica

== Gallery ==
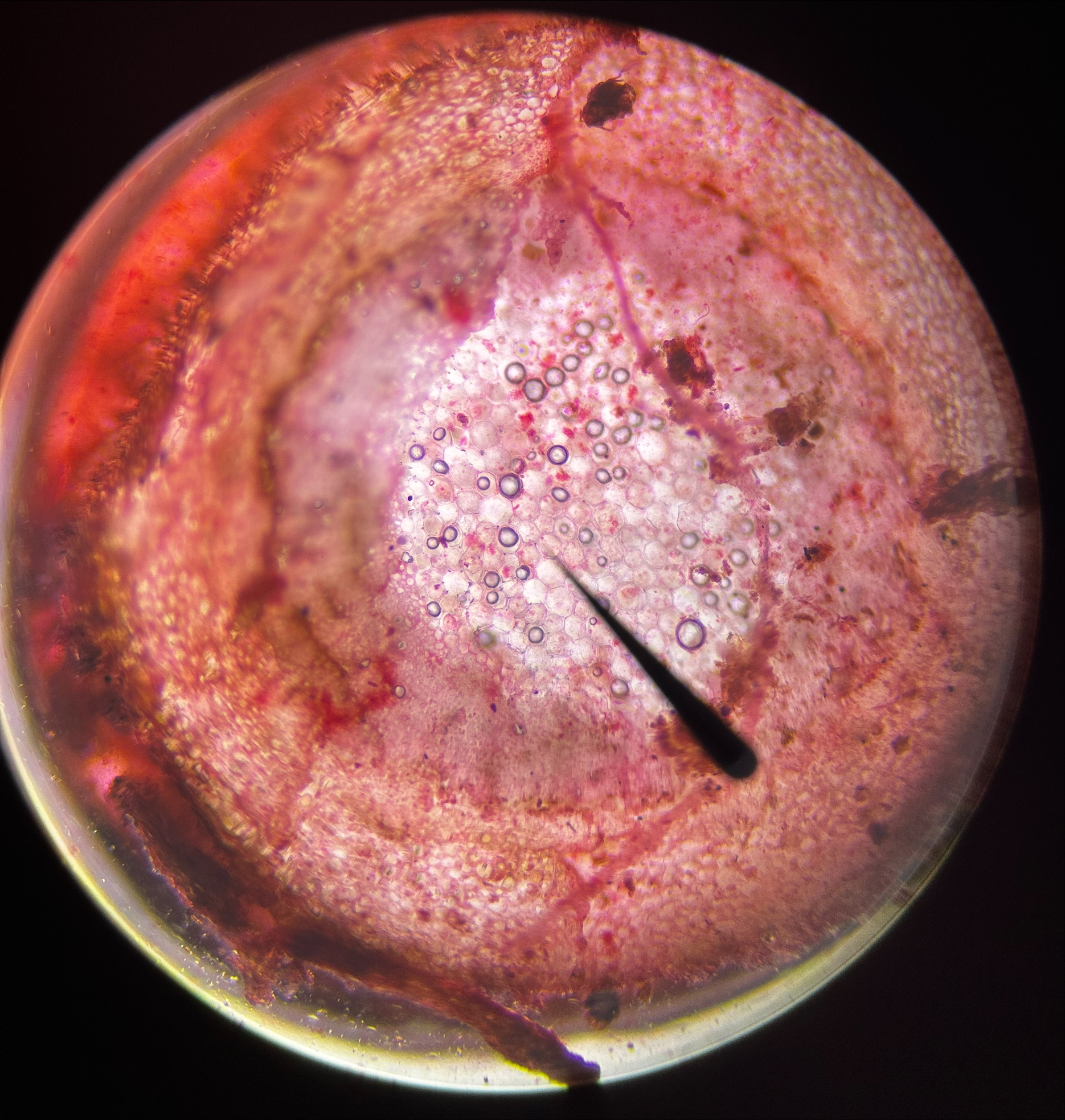
Cross-section of Urtica dioica~ 40x

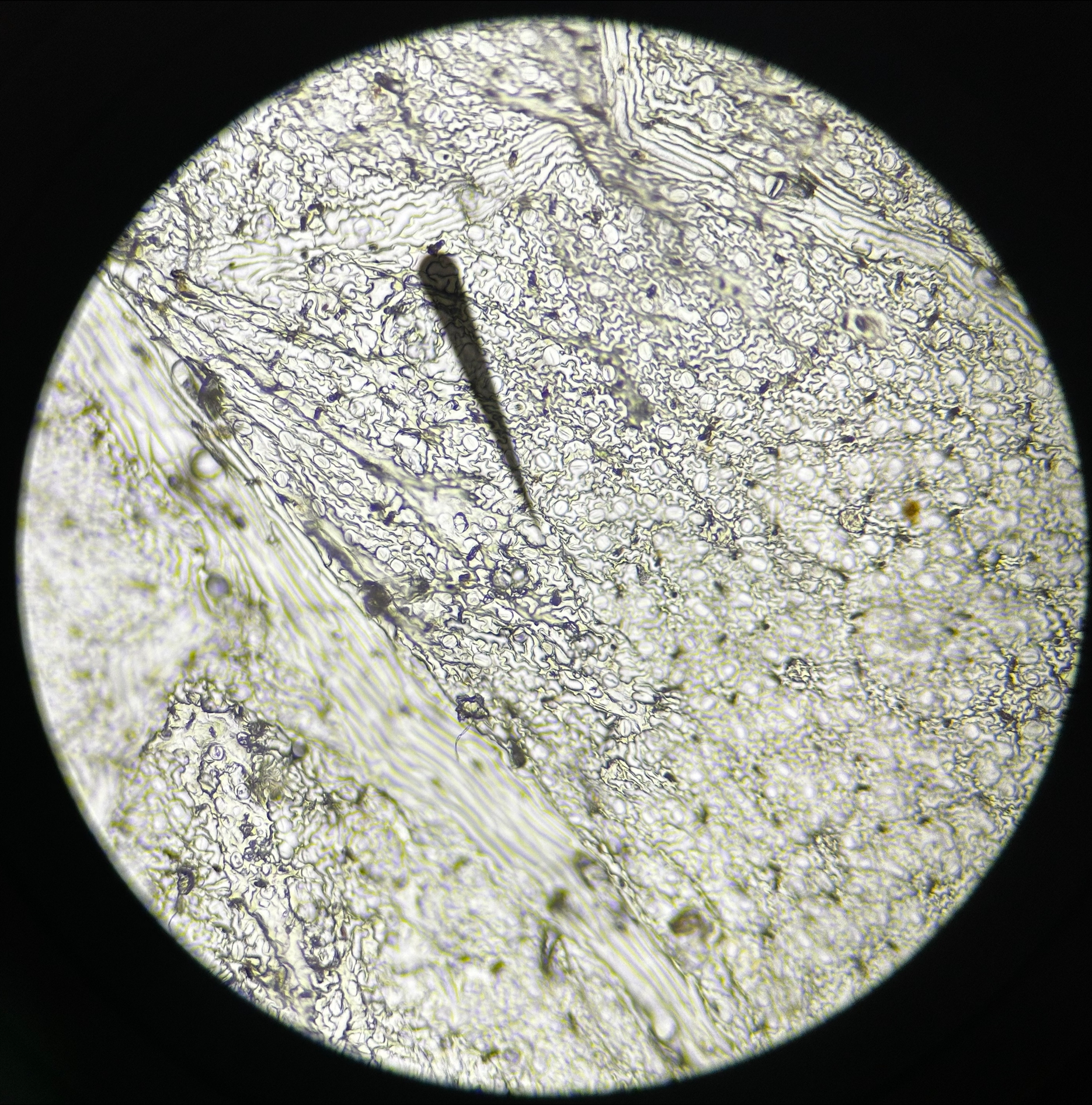
Microscope image of Urtica dioica ~40x

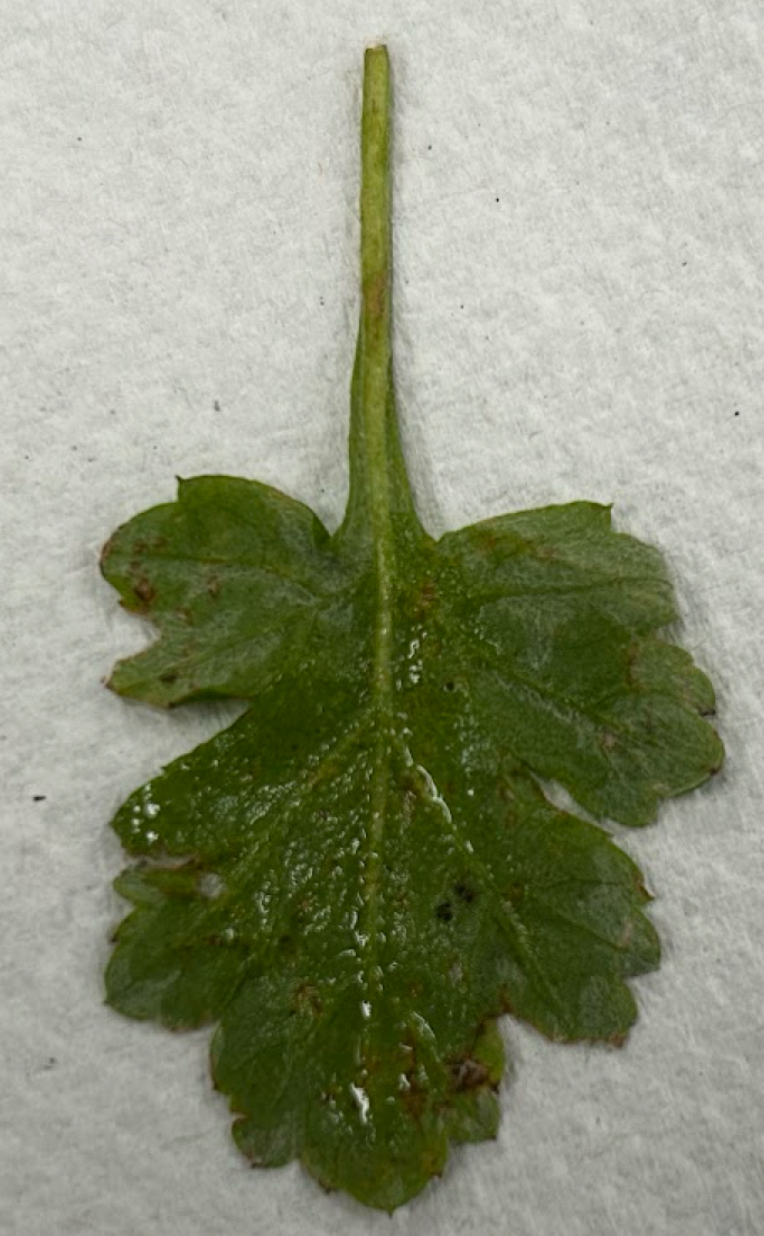
Leaf of Urtica dioica

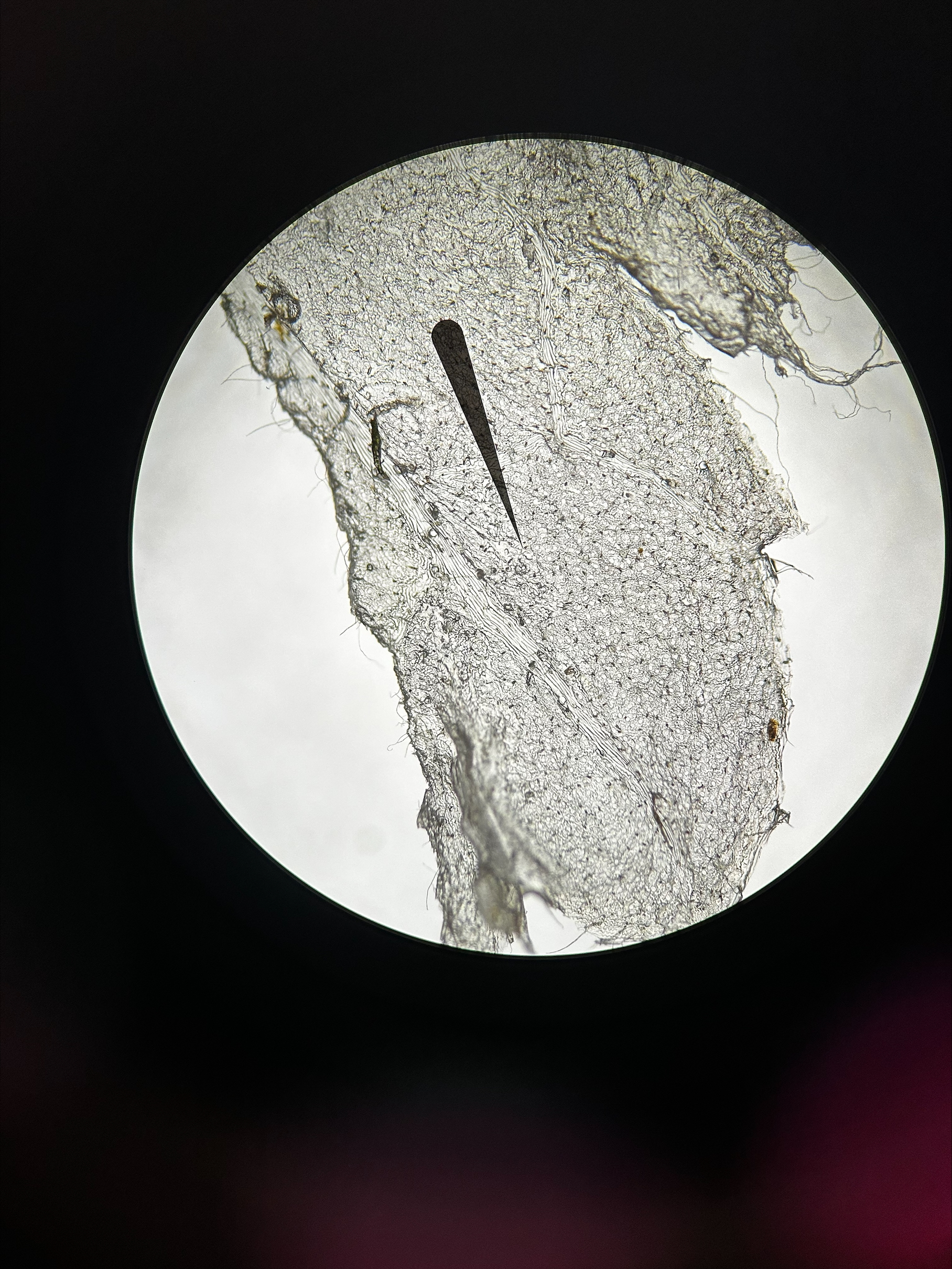
Microscope image of Urtica dioica ~10x

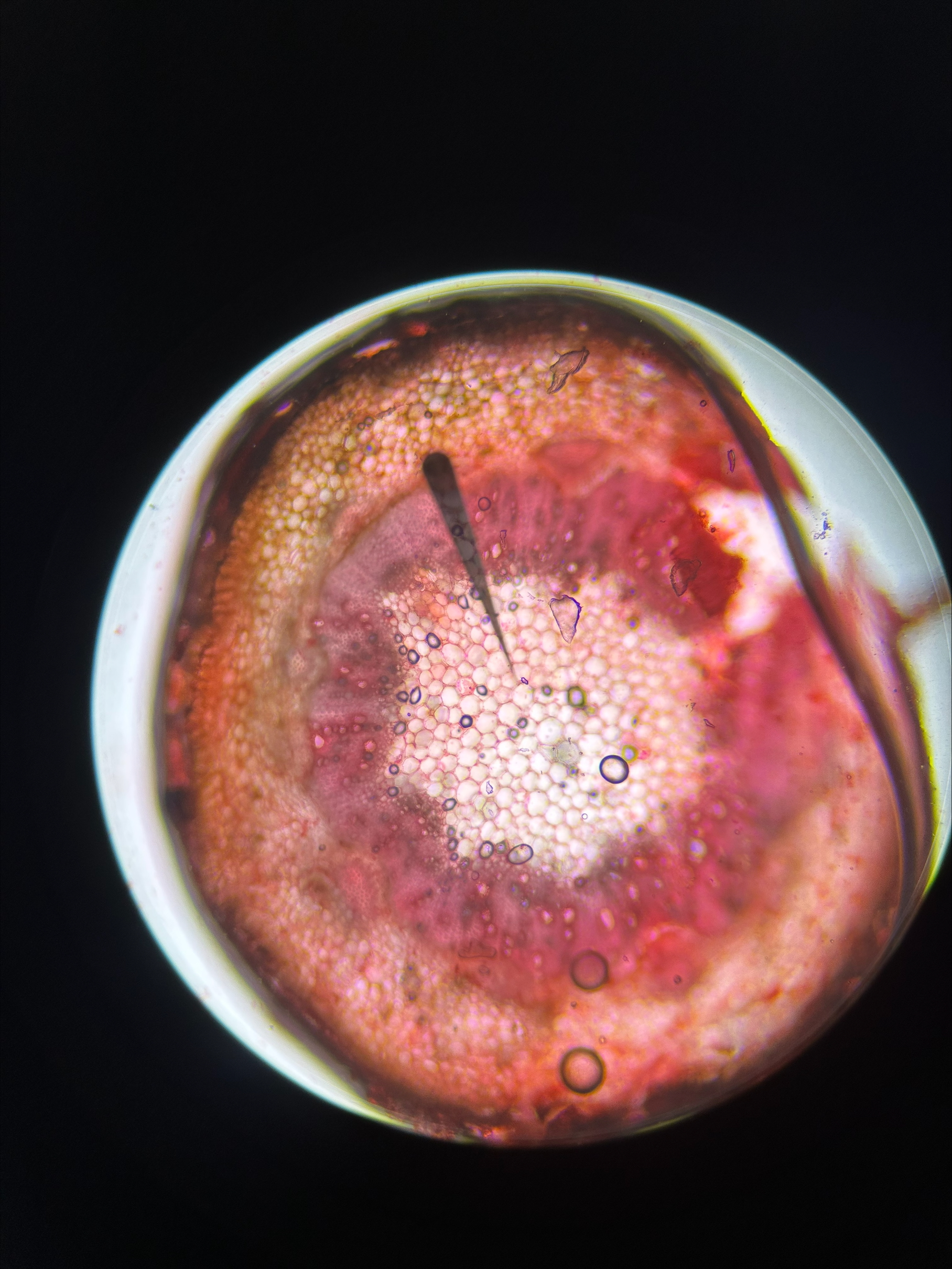
Cross-section ~40x
