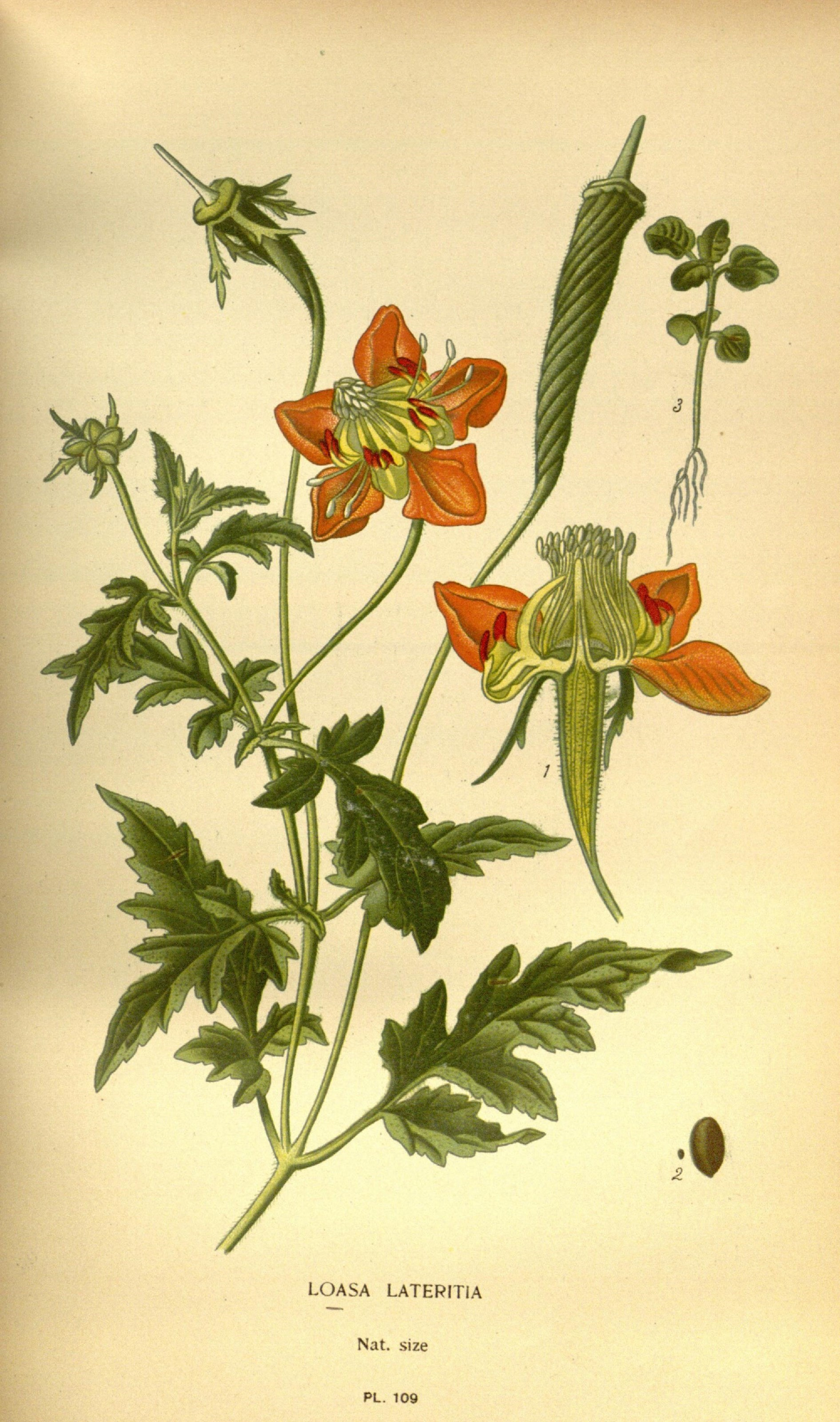
- Grausa lateritia

Scientific classification
- Kingdom: Plantae
- Clade: Tracheophytes
- Clade: Angiosperms
- Clade: Eudicots
- Clade: Asterids
- Order: Cornales
- Family: Loasaceae
- Genus: Grausa; Weigend & R.H.Acuña

Type species
- Grausa micrantha (Poepp.) Weigend & R.H.Acuña

Species
- Grausa acaulis; Grausa gayana; Grausa lateritia; Grausa martini; Grausa micrantha; Grausa sagittata

Synonyms
- Raphisanthe Lilja

= Grausa =

Genus of plants

Grausa is a genus of plants in the Loasaceae found in Chile and Argentina. It was previously included in the genus Loasa and was split to resolve a paraphyletic grouping of genera in the Loasaceae. The seeds of this genus have a characteristic hilar cone.

== Description ==
Grausa is a small genus of perennial herbs. Species generally assume one of two vegetative habits, either rhizomatous with short internodes or climbing with winding aerial stems. The petiolate leaves are arranged in a basal rosette. Leaf shape ranges from sagittate to pinnatisect to ternately compound and rarely pinnate. The leaves are covered in rough trichomes with few or no stinging hairs.

The inflorescences of Grausa species are axillary and may be one-flowered or branching and winding with multiple flowers. The bracts are pinnatisect or palmatisect. The flowers are borne on pedicels; those on one-flowered rhizomatous species are erect, whereas those on winding multi-flowered species are pendent. The boat-shaped petals are white or red, somewhat spreading, and basally narrowed. Their margins are flattened and rarely toothed. The floral scales are yellow, greenish, or red and slightly curved so as to resemble a hood. They have three slight ridges on the back and three thin distally widened dorsal threads. The floral scales enclose two curved staminodes which taper into a thin, threadlike apex. The ovary is mostly inferior and conical. The pistil, including the style, is divided into three lobes with numerous ovules. The seeds are small, dark brown, and oblong with a reticulate or deeply pitted seed coat. Each seed forms a distinct projecting structure known as a hilar cone, which is characteristic of the genus.

== Taxonomy and naming ==
Grausa was split from the genus Loasa in the journal Taxon in 2020 by Rafael Acuña and Maximilian Weigend following the discovery that Loasa was paraphyletic. Its species belonged to multiple groups within the Loasaceae, including the former Loasa series Volubiles and Acaules. These two series were found to lie in a clade containing the previously described genera Scyphanthus and Caiophora. Rather than lump the existing two genera into Loasa, which would create a morphologically incohesive grouping of taxa, it was decided to erect a new genus to preserve monophyly.

The name Grausa honors Munich scientist Jürke Grau, a researcher of Chilean flora. The genus name is a portmanteau of "Grau" and Loasa. At the time of the split, five species were transferred to the new genus. Subsequently, a former synonym of one of the original five Grausa species, G. lateritia, was reinstated as a separate species; it was originally described as Loasa acaulis and is now known as Grausa acaulis. As such, Grausa contains 6 accepted species:

- Grausa acaulis (Phil.) Santilli, D.H.Cohen & R.H.Acuña
- Grausa gayana (Urb. & Gilg) Weigend & R.H.Acuña
- Grausa lateritia (Gillies ex Arn.) Weigend & R.H.Acuña
- Grausa martini (Phil.) Weigend & R.H.Acuña
- Grausa micrantha (Poepp.) Weigend & R.H.Acuña
- Grausa sagittata (Hook. & Arn.) Weigend & R.H.Acuña

== Distribution and habitat ==
Grausa is distributed in Chile and Argentina along the Andes. Species may be found in volcanic rocky alpine habitats above the treeline or at lower elevations.
