= Carl Borivoj Presl =

Czech botanist (1794-1852)

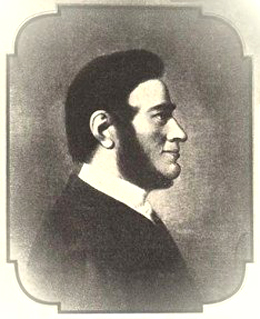
- Born: 17 February 1794; Prague, Bohemia, Habsburg monarchy
- Died: 2 October 1852 (aged 58); Prague, Bohemia, Austrian Empire
- Education: Charles University
- Scientific career
- Fields: Botany, medicine
- Author abbrev. (botany): C.Presl

Carl Borivoj Presl (Czech: Karel Bořivoj Presl; 17 February 1794 – 2 October 1852) was a Czech botanist. The standard author abbreviation C.Presl is used to indicate this person as the author when citing a botanical name.

== Life ==
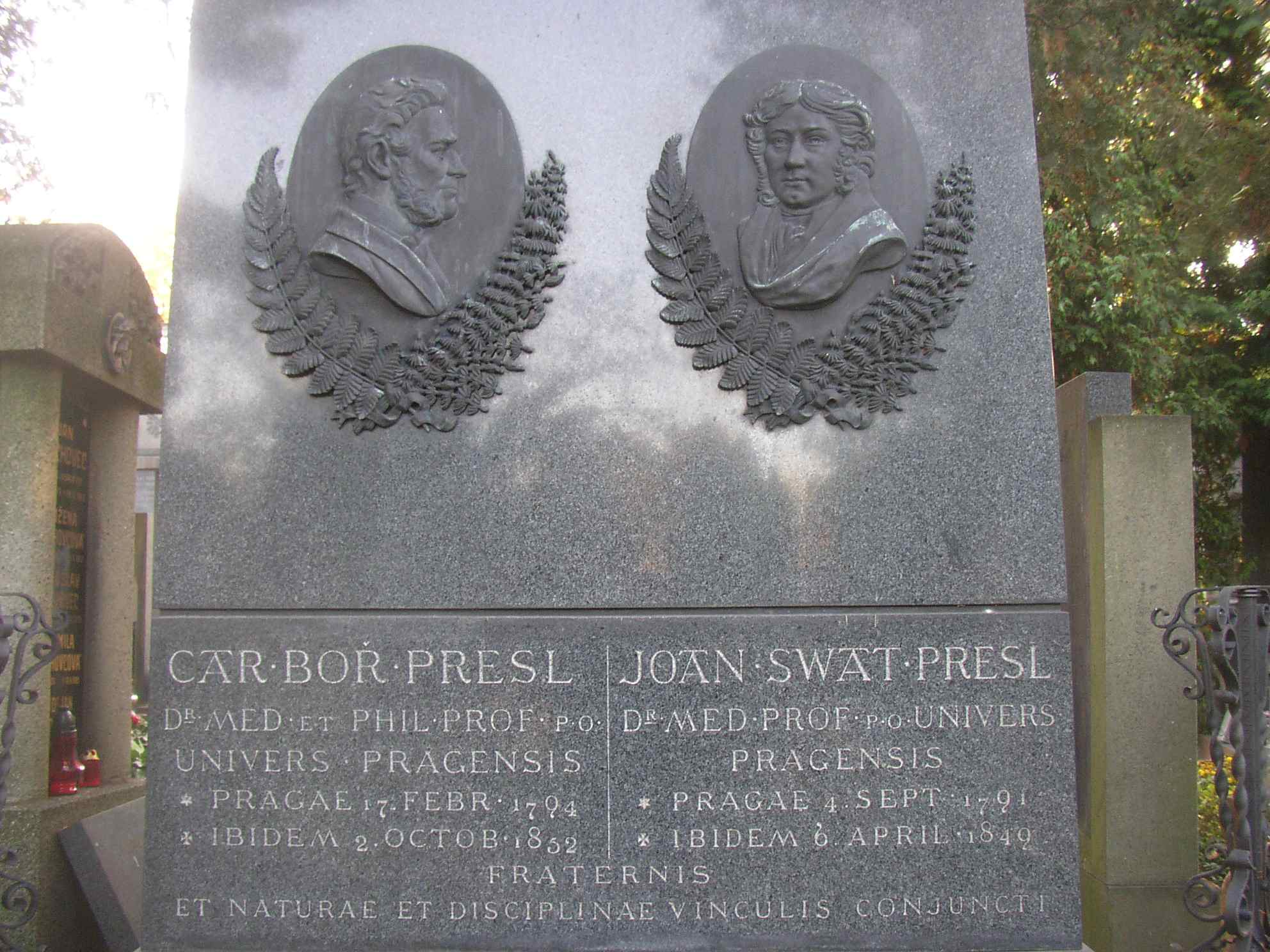
Gravesite of the Presl brothers at the Vyšehrad Cemetery in Prague

Presl was born on 17 February 1794 in Prague. His older brother Jan Svatopluk Presl was also a noted botanist. He lived his entire life in Prague, and was a professor of botany at the University of Prague (1833–1852). He made an expedition to Sicily in 1817, and with his brother, published a "Flora bohemica" titled "Flora čechica: indicatis medicinalibus, oeconomicis technologicisque plantis" in 1819. This work became the basis of Czech botanical nomenclature, but unlike his brother, Carl Borivoj wrote in German and Latin and not in Czech. From 1822, he was the custodian of the zoological and botanical collections of the National Museum (that time called Patriotic Museum) in Prague.

The journal Preslia of the Czech Botanical Society is named in the honour of Presl brothers. The botanical genera Preslaea Mart., 1827 from the family Boraginaceae, (now a synonym of Euploca Nutt. ) and Preslia Opiz, 1824 of the family Lamiaceae (it is also now a synonym of Woodsia R.Br.) are dedicated to the two brothers. In 2006, botanists (Urb. & Gilg) Weigend published Presliophytum, a genus of flowering plants from South America, belonging to the family Loasaceae which also honours Carl Borivoj Presl's name.

He spent nearly 15 years producing the exsiccata "Reliquiae Haenkeanae" (published from 1825 to 1835), a work based on botanical specimens collected in the Americas by Thaddäus Haenke.

Presl died on 2 October 1852 in Prague.

== See also ==
- Taxa named by Carl Borivoj Presl (C.Presl)

== Bibliography ==
- Carl Bořivoj Presl: "Reliquiae Haenkeanae : seu descriptiones et icones plantarum, quas in America meridionali et boreali, in insulis Philippinis et Marianis collegit Thaddaeus Haenke". J.G. Calve, Prague, 1825 to 1835.
- "Flora sicula, exhibens plantas vasculosas in Sicilia aut sponte crescentes aut frequentissime cultas, secundum systema naturale digestas", 1826.
- "Symbolae botanicae, sive, Descriptiones et icones plantarum novarum aut minus cognitarum", 1832.
- "Catalogue of Ferns: After the Arrangement of C. Sprengel", 1841; Whittaker and Company, 1841.
- Hymenophyllaceae, 1845 – Monograph on Hymenophyllaceae.
- "Supplementum Tentaminis Pteridographiae", 1847.
- Die Gefässbündel im Stipes der Farrn, 1848 – The vascular bundles in the stipes of ferns.
