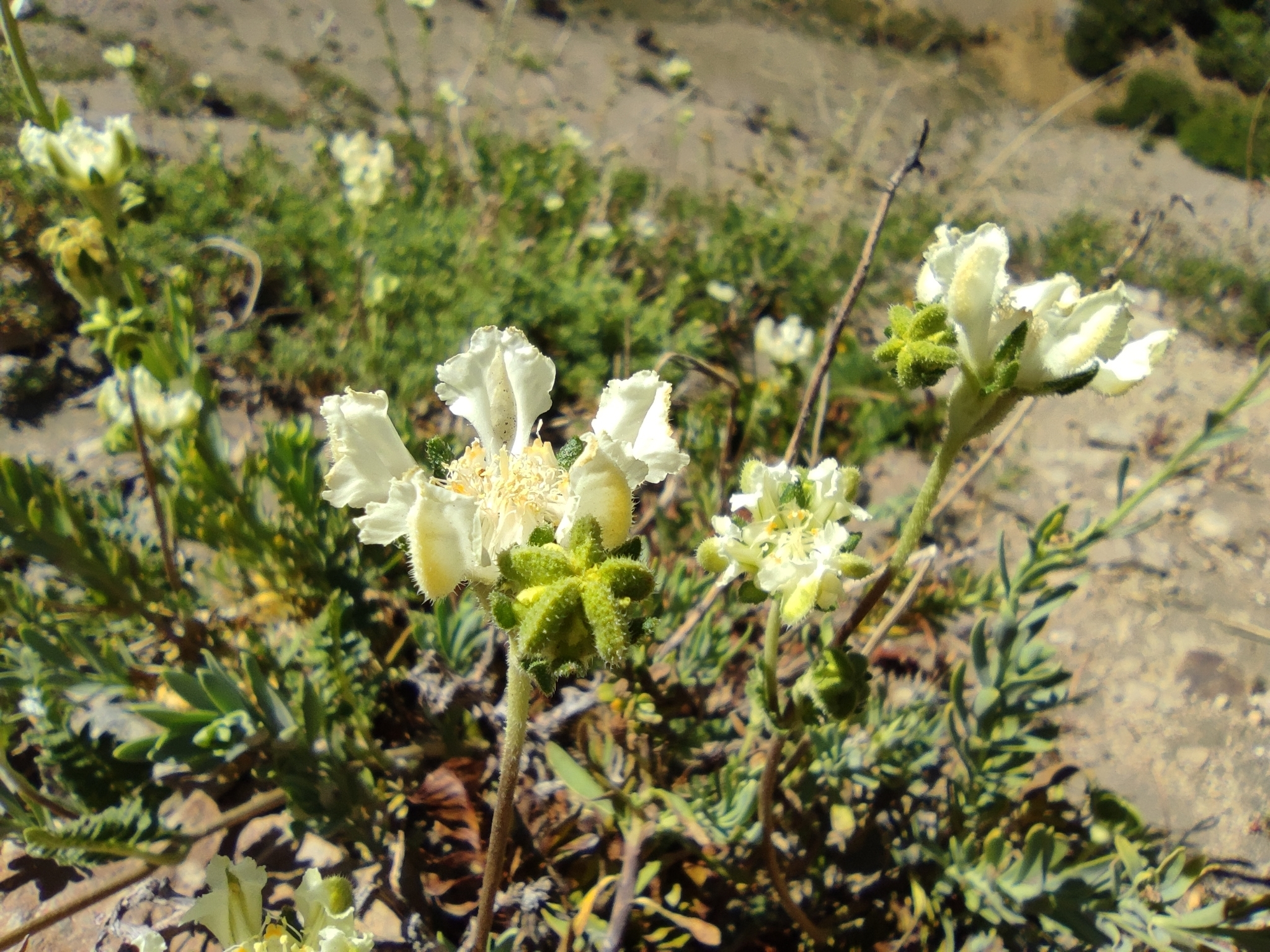
- Pinnasa pinnatifida

Scientific classification
- Kingdom: Plantae
- Clade: Embryophytes
- Clade: Tracheophytes
- Clade: Angiosperms
- Clade: Eudicots
- Clade: Asterids
- Order: Cornales
- Family: Loasaceae
- Genus: Pinnasa; Weigend & R.H.Acuña (2017)

Species
- 7; see text

= Pinnasa =

Genus of flowering plants

Pinnasa is a genus of flowering plants in the family Loasaceae. It includes seven species that are native to Argentina and central and southern Chile.

- Pinnasa amabilis (Urb. & Gilg) D.H.Cohen, R.H.Acuña & Weigend
- Pinnasa bergii (Hieron.) Weigend & R.H.Acuña
- Pinnasa incurva (R.L.Pérez-Mor. & Crespo) D.H.Cohen, R.H.Acuña & Weigend
- Pinnasa kurtzii (Urb. & Gilg) R.H.Acuña, D.H.Cohen & Weigend
- Pinnasa nana (Phil.) Weigend & R.H.Acuña
- Pinnasa pinnatifida (Gillies ex Arn.) Weigend & R.H.Acuña
- Pinnasa volubilis (Dombey ex Juss.) Weigend & R.H.Acuña
