= Petalonyx linearis =

Conservation status
- Apparently Secure (NatureServe)

Scientific classification
- Kingdom: Plantae
- Clade: Tracheophytes
- Clade: Angiosperms
- Clade: Eudicots
- Clade: Asterids
- Order: Cornales
- Family: Loasaceae
- Genus: Petalonyx
- Species: P. linearis

Binomial name
- Petalonyx linearis Greene

Species of flowering plant

Petalonyx linearis is a species of flowering plant in the family Loasaceae known by the common name narrowleaf sandpaper plant. It is native to the deserts of eastern California, western Arizona and northwestern Mexico, where it grows in scrub and other habitat. It is a rounded clumpy subshrub made up of many rough-haired, erect stems up to a meter tall.

The cylindrical stems are lined evenly with linear to widely lance-shaped leaves 1 to 2.5 centimeters long. The inflorescence at the end of each stem is a raceme of many small five-petalled white flowers surrounded by rounded or oval bracts with pointed, lobed, or notched tips.
