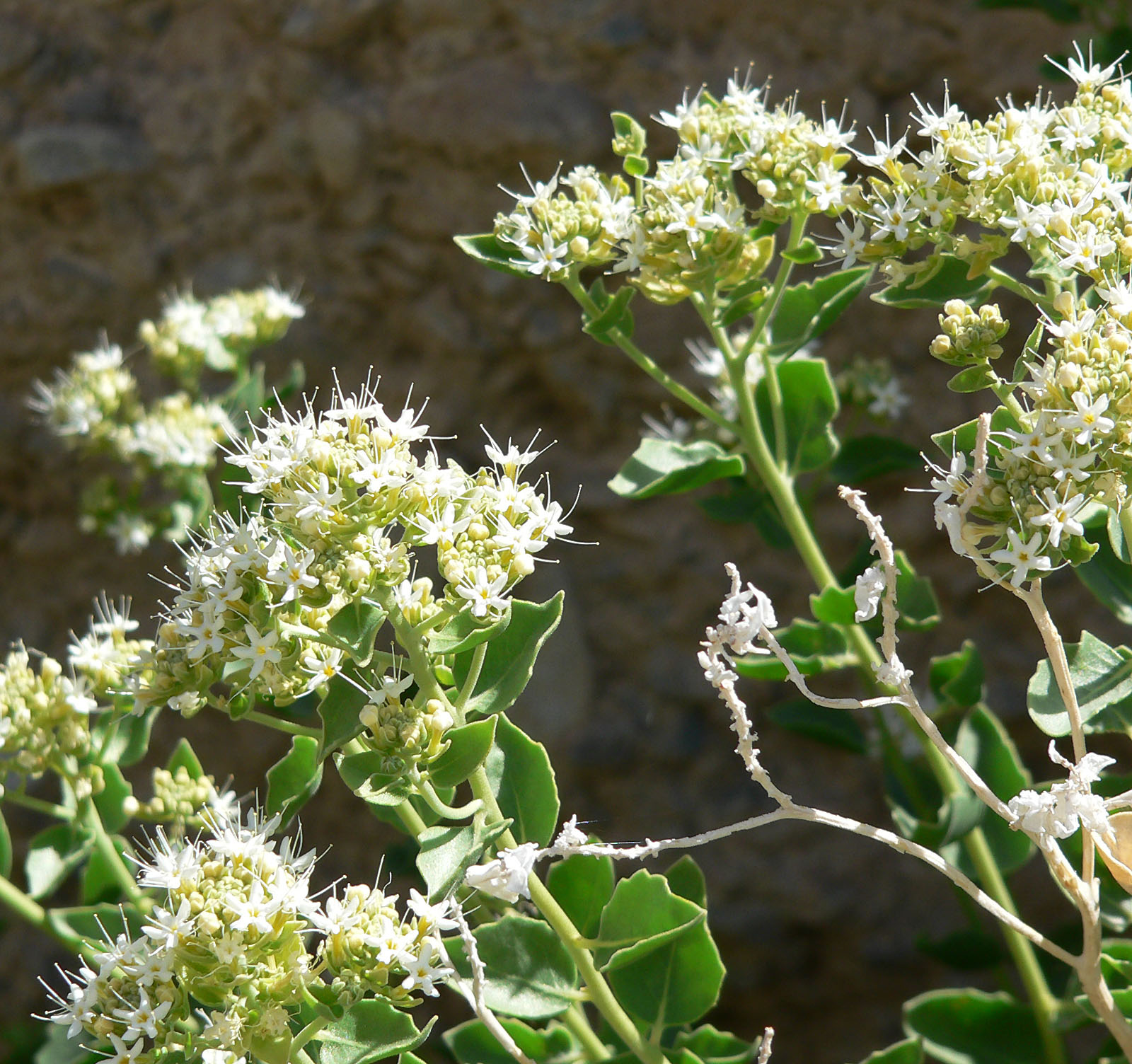

Scientific classification
- Kingdom: Plantae
- Clade: Tracheophytes
- Clade: Angiosperms
- Clade: Eudicots
- Clade: Asterids
- Order: Cornales
- Family: Loasaceae
- Genus: Petalonyx
- Species: P. nitidus

Binomial name
- Petalonyx nitidus S.Watson

= Petalonyx nitidus =

Species of flowering plant

Petalonyx nitidus is a species of flowering plant in the family Loasaceae known by the common name shinyleaf sandpaper plant. It is native to the deserts and desert mountains of the southwestern United States, where it grows in scrub, woodland, and other habitat. It is a clumpy subshrub made up of many rough-haired, erect or spreading stems growing 15 to 45 centimeters long. The leaves are oval, pointed, usually toothed or serrated, and up to 4 centimeters long. The inflorescence at the end of the stem is a crowded raceme of many flowers. The flower appears tubular, its white petals fused near the spreading tips but open lower, the long stamens extending well beyond the corolla, and unusual in that they emerge from outside the corolla.
