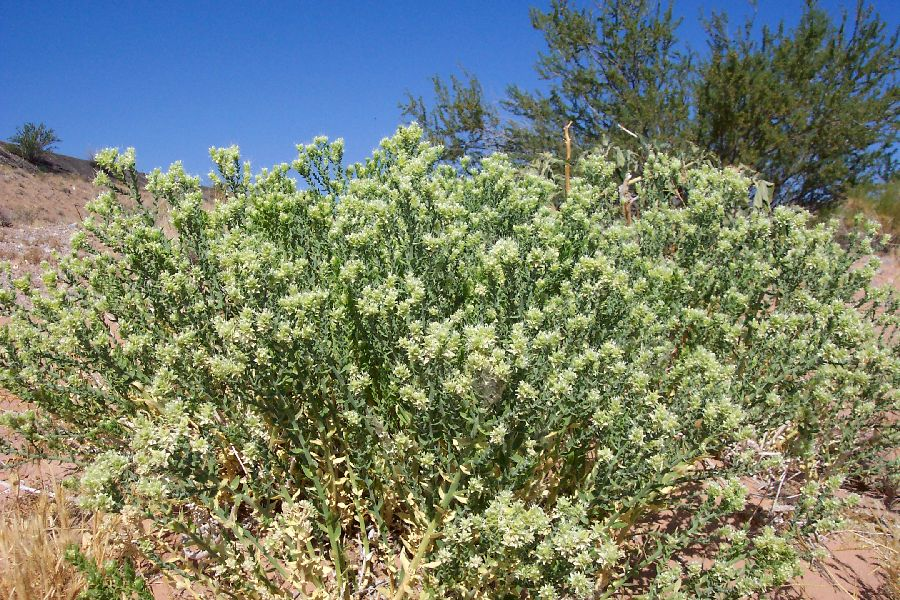

Conservation status
- Secure (NatureServe)

Scientific classification
- Kingdom: Plantae
- Clade: Tracheophytes
- Clade: Angiosperms
- Clade: Eudicots
- Clade: Asterids
- Order: Cornales
- Family: Loasaceae
- Genus: Petalonyx
- Species: P. thurberi

Binomial name
- Petalonyx thurberi A.Gray

= Petalonyx thurberi =

Species of flowering plant

Petalonyx thurberi is a species of flowering plant in the family Loasaceae known by the common names Thurber's sandpaper plant and common sandpaper plant. It is native to the deserts of the southwestern United States and northwestern Mexico, where it grows in sandy and scrubby habitat. It is a rounded or spreading, clumpy subshrub made up of many rough-haired stems approaching one meter in maximum height. The stems are lined with clasping leaves varying in shape from lance-shaped to triangular to oval and sometimes toothed. The inflorescence at the end of the stem is a small, crowded raceme of several flowers. The white flower appears tubular, its petals fused near the spreading tips but open lower, the stamens emerging from outside the corolla.

There are two subspecies, with the rarer, ssp. gilmanii (Death Valley sandpaper plant), limited to the deserts in and around Death Valley.
