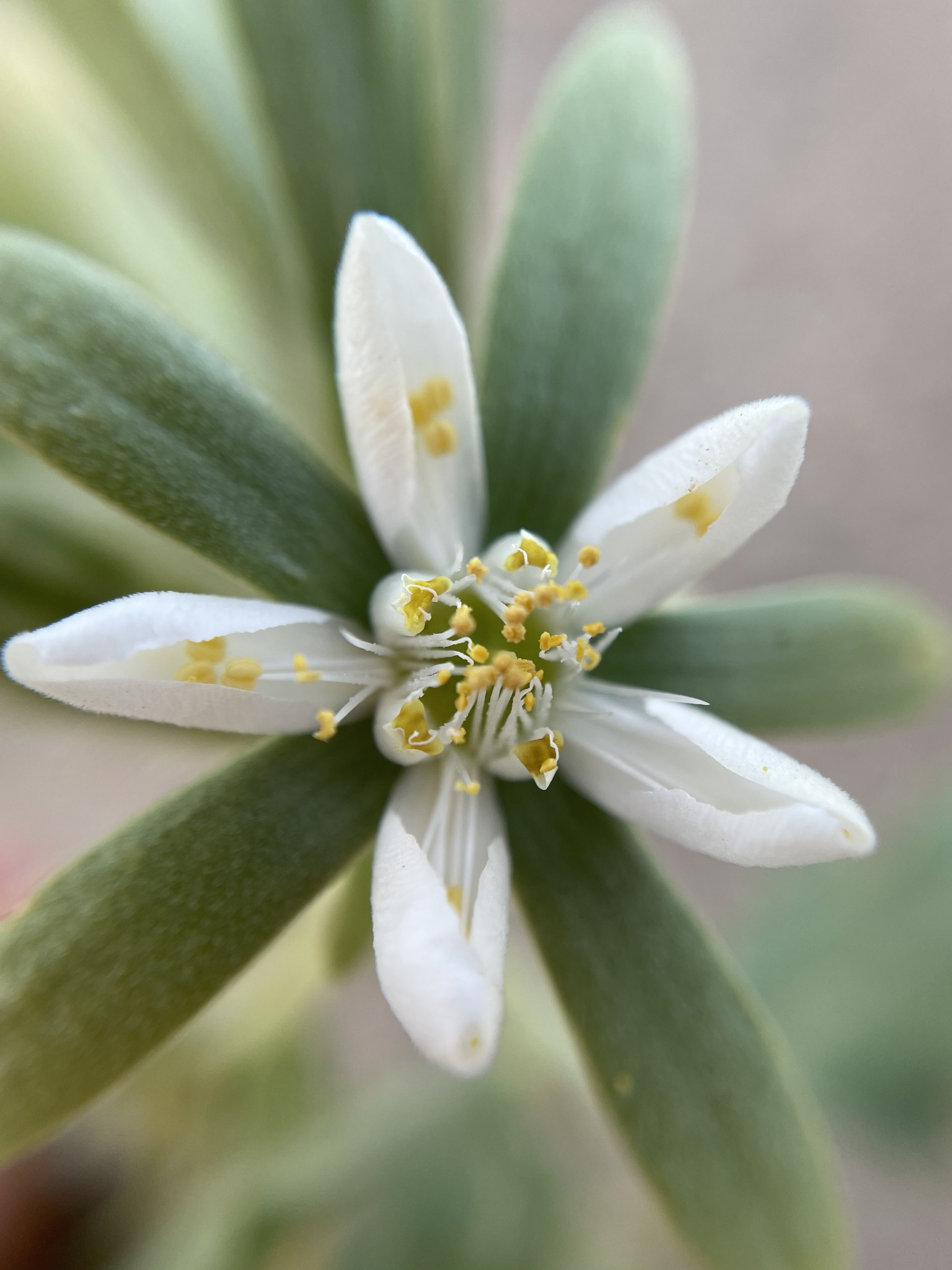

Conservation status
- Least Concern (SANBI Red List)

Scientific classification
- Kingdom: Plantae
- Clade: Tracheophytes
- Clade: Angiosperms
- Clade: Eudicots
- Clade: Asterids
- Order: Cornales
- Family: Loasaceae
- Genus: Kissenia
- Species: K. capensis

Binomial name
- Kissenia capensis Endl.

Synonyms
- Kissenia spathulata R.Br. ex T.Anderson

= Kissenia capensis =

Species of flowering plant

Kissenia capensis is a species of flowering plant in the genus Kissenia. It is native to Namibia and the Northern Cape Province of South Africa.

== Distribution ==
Kissenia capensis is found from Namibia to the Northern Cape of South Africa.

== Conservation status ==
Kissenia capensis is classified as Least Concern.
