= List of plants known as nettle =

Nettle refers to plants with stinging hairs, particularly those of the genus Urtica. It can also refer to plants which resemble Urtica species in appearance but do not have stinging hairs, such as dead nettle or false nettle listed below. Plants called "nettle" include:

- Ball nettle – Solanum carolinense
- Bull nettle
  - Cnidoscolus stimulosus, bull nettle, spurge nettle
  - Cnidoscolus texanus, Texas bull nettle
  - Cnidoscolus urens, bull nettle
  - Solanum elaeagnifolium, bull nettle, silver-leaf nettle, white horse-nettle
- Dead nettle, dumb nettle
  - Lamium, particularly Lamium album
- False nettle – Boehmeria
- Flame nettle – Coleus
- Hedge nettle – Stachys
- Hemp nettle – Galeopsis
- Horse nettle:
  - Agastache urticifolia – horse-nettle
  - Solanum carolinense – ball-nettle, Carolina horse-nettle
  - Solanum dimidiatum – western horse-nettle, robust horse-nettle
  - Solanum elaeagnifolium – bull nettle, silver-leaf nettle, white horse-nettle
  - Solanum rostratum – horse-nettle
- nettle tree or tree nettle:
  - Celtis
  - Various species of the genus Dendrocnide
  - Urera baccifera
  - Urtica ferox
- Nilgiri nettle, Himalayan giant nettle - Girardinia diversifolia
- Painted nettle – Coleus scutellarioides
- Rock nettle – Eucnide
- Shiny-leaved nettle – Dendrocnide photiniphylla
- Spurge nettle – Cnidoscolus
- Stinging nettle
  - Hesperocnide
  - most, but not all subspecies of Urtica dioica
  - Urtica gracilis
  - Urtica incisa
  - Urtica ferox
- Tree nettle - see nettle tree
- White nettle
  - Lamium album
  - Pipturus argenteus
- Wood nettle - Laportea canadensis
