= Plakothira =

Scientific classification
- Kingdom: Plantae
- Clade: Tracheophytes
- Clade: Angiosperms
- Clade: Eudicots
- Clade: Asterids
- Order: Cornales
- Family: Loasaceae
- Genus: Plakothira; J.Florence

Genus of plants

Plakothira is a genus of flowering plants belonging to the family Loasaceae.

Its native range is Marquesas.

Species:

- Plakothira frutescens J.Florence
- Plakothira parviflora J.Florence
- Plakothira perlmanii J.Florence
