= Fuertesia =

Scientific classification
- Kingdom: Plantae
- Clade: Tracheophytes
- Clade: Angiosperms
- Clade: Eudicots
- Clade: Asterids
- Order: Cornales
- Family: Loasaceae
- Genus: Fuertesia; Urb.
- Species: F. domingensis

Binomial name
- Fuertesia domingensis Urb.

Genus of Loasaceae plants

Fuertesia is a genus of flowering plants in the family Loasaceae. It has only one currently accepted species, Fuertesia domingensis, native to Hispaniola. It is a woody climbing liana.
