= Xylopodia =

Scientific classification
- Kingdom: Plantae
- Clade: Tracheophytes
- Clade: Angiosperms
- Clade: Eudicots
- Clade: Asterids
- Order: Cornales
- Family: Loasaceae
- Genus: Xylopodia; Weigend

Genus of flowering plants

Xylopodia is a genus of flowering plants belonging to the family Loasaceae.

Its native range is Peru, Bolivia, and northwest Argentina.

Species:

- Xylopodia klaprothioides Weigend
- Xylopodia laurensis C.M.Martín & C.A.Zanotti
