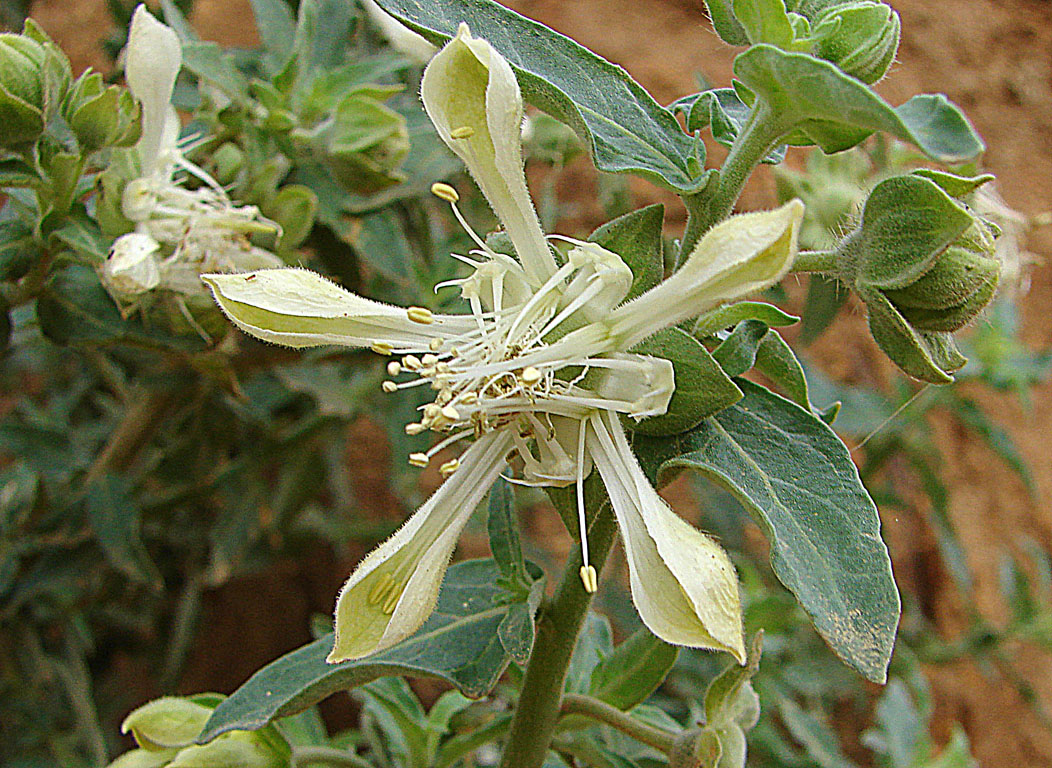

Scientific classification
- Kingdom: Plantae
- Clade: Tracheophytes
- Clade: Angiosperms
- Clade: Eudicots
- Clade: Asterids
- Order: Cornales
- Family: Loasaceae
- Genus: Presliophytum (Urb. & Gilg) Weigend

= Presliophytum =

Genus of plants

Presliophytum is a genus of flowering plants belonging to the family Loasaceae.

It is native to Peru, Chile and north-western Argentina.

The genus name of Presliophytum is in honour of Carl Borivoj Presl (1794–1852), a Czech botanist. The -phytum part of the name refers to phyte meaning 'plant'. It was first described and published in Taxon Vol.55 on page 467 in 2006.

== Known species ==
According to Kew:

- Presliophytum arequipense Weigend
- Presliophytum heucherifolium (Killip) Weigend
- Presliophytum incanum (Graham) Weigend
- Presliophytum malesherbioides (Phil.) R.H.Acuña & Weigend
- Presliophytum sessiliflorum (Phil.) R.H.Acuña & Weigend
