= Schismocarpus =

Scientific classification
- Kingdom: Plantae
- Clade: Tracheophytes
- Clade: Angiosperms
- Clade: Eudicots
- Clade: Asterids
- Order: Cornales
- Family: Loasaceae
- Genus: Schismocarpus; S.F.Blake

Genus of plants

Schismocarpus is a genus of flowering plants belonging to the family Loasaceae.

Its native range is Southern Mexico.

Species:

- Schismocarpus matudae Steyerm.
- Schismocarpus pachypus S.F.Blake
