= Aosa =

Scientific classification
- Kingdom: Plantae
- Clade: Tracheophytes
- Clade: Angiosperms
- Clade: Eudicots
- Clade: Asterids
- Order: Cornales
- Family: Loasaceae
- Genus: Aosa; Weigend

Genus of flowering plants

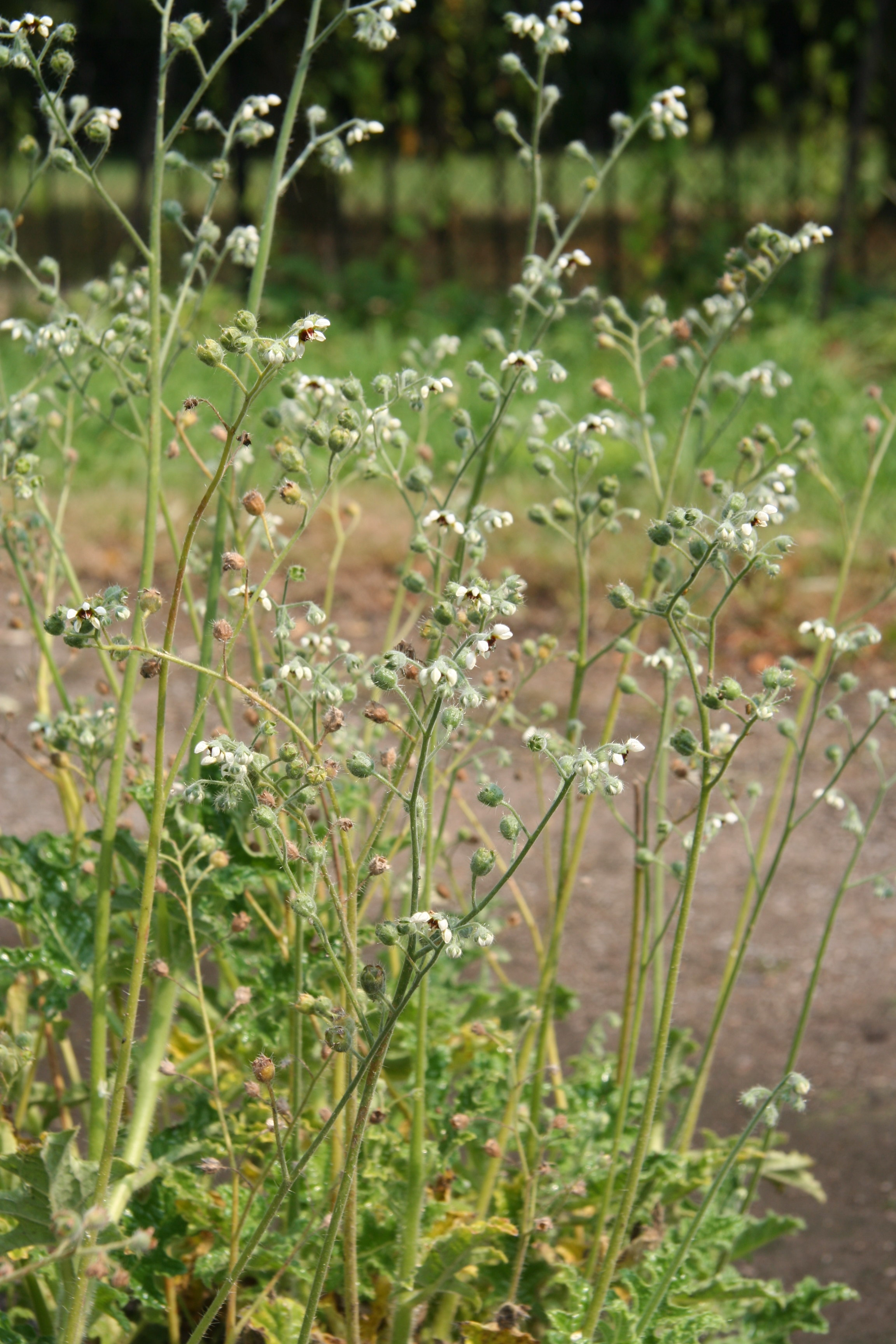
Aosa rupestris in the Botanical Garden, Dresden.

Aosa is a genus of flowering plants belonging to the family Loasaceae.

Its native range includes the Caribbean, Central America to Colombia, and Brazil.

Species:

- Aosa gilgiana (Urb.) Weigend
- Aosa grandis (Standl.) R.H.Acuña & Weigend
- Aosa parviflora (Schrad. ex DC.) Weigend
- Aosa plumieri (Urb.) Weigend
- Aosa rupestris (Gardner) Weigend
- Aosa sigmoidea Weigend
