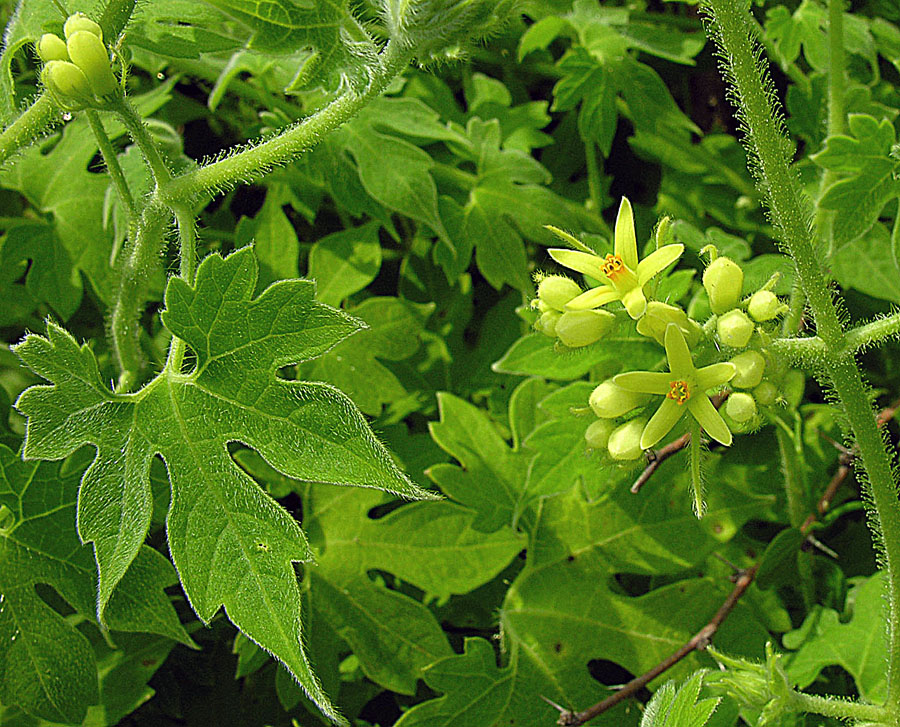
- Gronovia scandens

Scientific classification
- Kingdom: Plantae
- Clade: Tracheophytes
- Clade: Angiosperms
- Clade: Eudicots
- Clade: Asterids
- Order: Cornales
- Family: Loasaceae
- Subfamily: Gronovioideae
- Genus: Gronovia; Houst. ex L.

Species
- See text

= Gronovia =

Genus of Loasaceae plants

Gronovia is a genus of flowering plants in the family Loasaceae, native to Mexico, Central America and northwest South America. They are annual climbing herbs with irritating stinging hairs.

== Species ==
Currently accepted species include:

- Gronovia longiflora Rose
- Gronovia scandens L.
