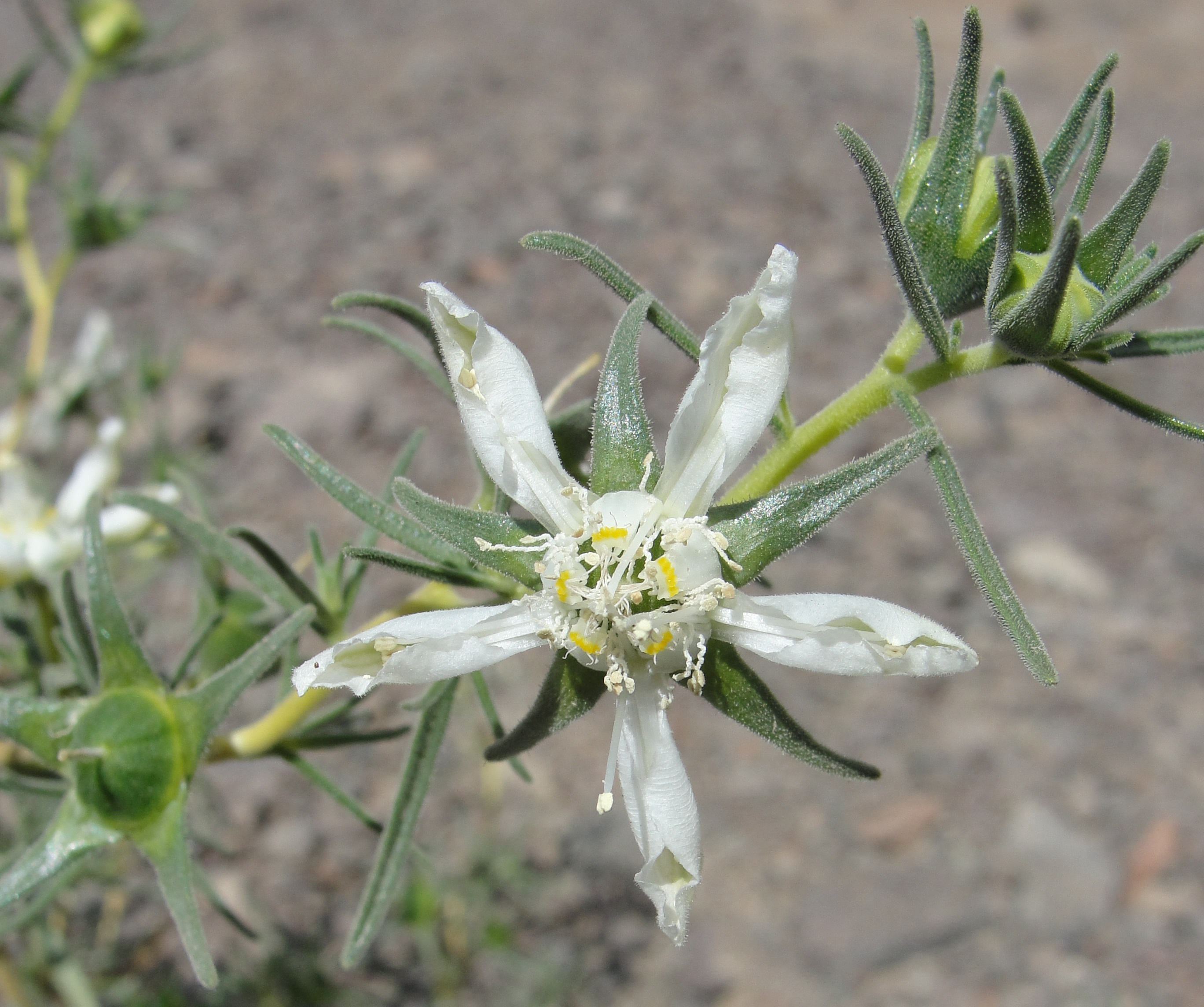
- Huidobria chilensis

Scientific classification
- Kingdom: Plantae
- Clade: Tracheophytes
- Clade: Angiosperms
- Clade: Eudicots
- Clade: Asterids
- Order: Cornales
- Family: Loasaceae
- Genus: Huidobria; Gay

= Huidobria =

Genus of flowering plants

Huidobria is a genus of flowering plants belonging to the family Loasaceae.

It is native to northern Chile.

The genus name of Huidobria is in honour of Francisco García de Huidobro Aldunate (1791–1852), a Chilean politician and director of the national library. He was also conservator at the natural history museum in Chile. The genus was first described and published in Fl. Chil. Vol.2 on page 438 in 1847.

Known species, according to Kew:

- Huidobria chilensis Gay
- Huidobria fruticosa Phil.
