= Blumenbachia =

Scientific classification
- Kingdom: Plantae
- Clade: Tracheophytes
- Clade: Angiosperms
- Clade: Eudicots
- Clade: Asterids
- Order: Cornales
- Family: Loasaceae
- Genus: Blumenbachia; Schrad.

Genus of flowering plants

Blumenbachia is a genus of flowering plants belonging to the family Loasaceae.

Its native range is Southeastern and Southern Brazil to Southern South America.

Species:

- Blumenbachia amana T.Henning & Weigend
- Blumenbachia catharinensis Urb. & Gilg
- Blumenbachia dissecta (Hook. & Arn.) Weigend & Grau
- Blumenbachia eichleri Urb.
- Blumenbachia espigneera Gay
- Blumenbachia exalata Weigend
- Blumenbachia hieronymi Urb.
- Blumenbachia insignis Schrad.
- Blumenbachia latifolia Cambess.
- Blumenbachia prietea Gay
- Blumenbachia scabra (Miers) Urb.
- Blumenbachia silvestris Poepp.
