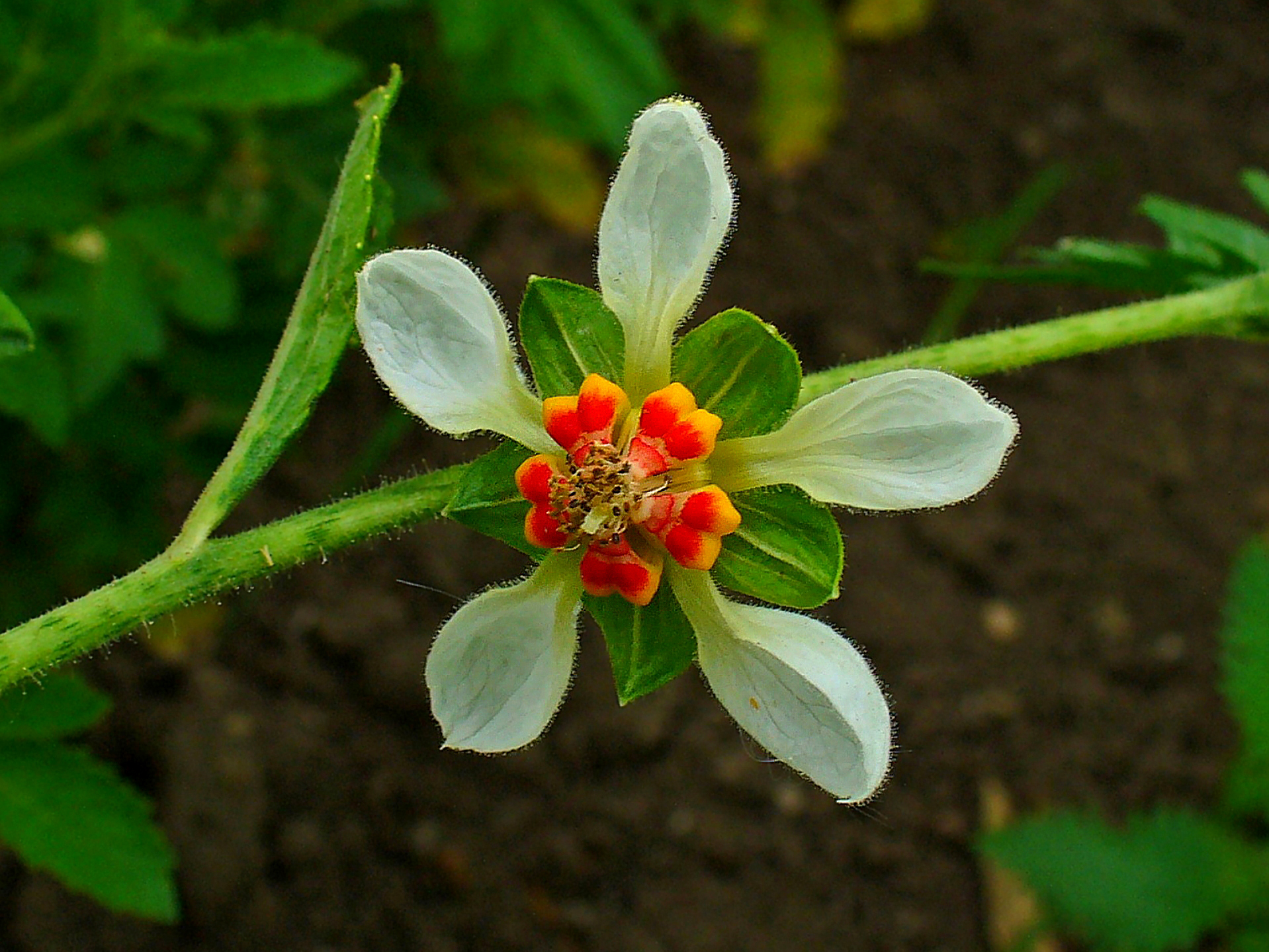

Scientific classification
- Kingdom: Plantae
- Clade: Tracheophytes
- Clade: Angiosperms
- Clade: Eudicots
- Clade: Asterids
- Order: Cornales
- Family: Loasaceae
- Genus: Loasa
- Species: L. vulcanica

Binomial name
- Loasa vulcanica André

= Loasa vulcanica =

Species of shrub

Loasa vulcanica is a shrub in the family Loasaceae native to Ecuador. The solitary 2.5 cm (0.98 in) flowers have five white, concave petals, each with a cluster of stamens resting in the cavity. There are also five heart-shaped staminodes with brightly colored concentric bands in this order: yellow, red, white, red and yellow. The simple, large-toothed leaves are covered with stinging hairs.
