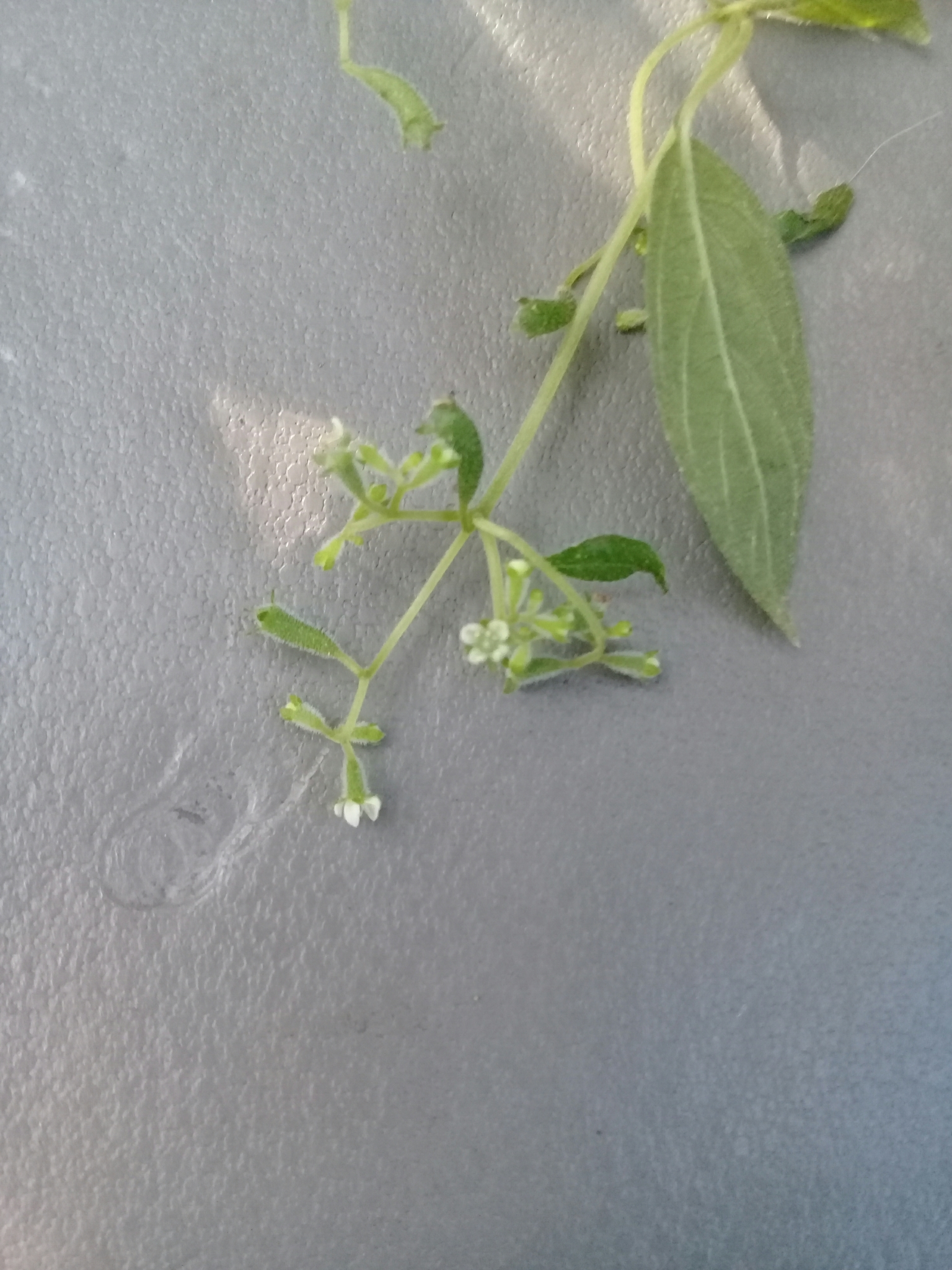
- Klaprothia fasciculata

Scientific classification
- Kingdom: Plantae
- Clade: Tracheophytes
- Clade: Angiosperms
- Clade: Eudicots
- Clade: Asterids
- Order: Cornales
- Family: Loasaceae
- Genus: Klaprothia; Kunth

Synonyms
- Ancyrostemma Poepp.; Sclerothrix C.Presl

= Klaprothia =

Genus of flowering plants

Klaprothia is a genus of flowering plants belonging to the family Loasaceae.

Its native range is Mexico to southern Tropical America and Hispaniola. It is found in the countries of Bolivia, Brazil, Colombia, Costa Rica, Ecuador, El Salvador, Galápagos, Guatemala, Haiti, Honduras, Mexico, Nicaragua, Panamá, Peru and Venezuela.

The genus name of Klaprothia is in honour of Martin Heinrich Klaproth (1743–1817), a German chemist. It was first described and published in (F.W.H.von Humboldt, A.J.A.Bonpland & C.S.Kunth) Nov. Gen. Sp. Vol.6 on page 121 in 1823.

== Species ==
According to Kew:

- Klaprothia fasciculata (C.Presl) Poston
- Klaprothia mentzelioides Kunth
