= Loasa =

- Loasa acerifolia

Scientific classification
- Kingdom: Plantae
- Clade: Tracheophytes
- Clade: Angiosperms
- Clade: Eudicots
- Clade: Asterids
- Order: Cornales
- Family: Loasaceae
- Genus: Loasa; Adans.

Species
- See text.

Genus of flowering plants

Loasa is a genus of flowering plants in the family Loasaceae. The genus contains 24 species native to South America. Species of Loasa are prickly herbs or shrubs that have nettle-like stinging hairs. Some species of Loasa are grown as ornamental plants and are known as Chile nettle. Its flowers have five yellow petals covering united stamens and distinctive large coloured nectaries. Caiophora is a closely related genus that also has stinging hairs and is found on rocky slopes of the Andes.

== Selected Species ==
- Loasa acanthifolia Lam.
- Loasa acerifolia Dombey ex A.Juss.
- Loasa argentina Urb. & Gilg
- Loasa arnottiana Gay
- Loasa caespitosa Phil.
- Loasa elongata Hook. & Arn.
- Loasa elongata Hook. & Arn.
- Loasa filicifolia Poepp.
- Loasa floribunda Hook. & Arn.
- Loasa hastata Killip
- Loasa heterophylla Hook. & Arn.
- Loasa humilis F.Phil.
- Loasa illapelina Phil.
- Loasa incurva R.L.Pérez-Mor. & Crespo
- Loasa insons Poepp.
- Loasa mollensis Muñoz-Schick & Trenq.
- Loasa multifida Gay
- Loasa nitida Desr.
- Loasa pallida Gillies ex Arn.
- Loasa paradoxa Urb. & Gilg
- Loasa placei Lindl.
- Loasa prostrata Gillies ex Arn.
- Loasa sclareifolia Juss.
- Loasa sigmoidea Urb. & Gilg
- Loasa tricolor Ker Gawl.
- Loasa triloba Juss.
- Loasa unguiculata Urb. & Gilg
- Loasa vulcanica
