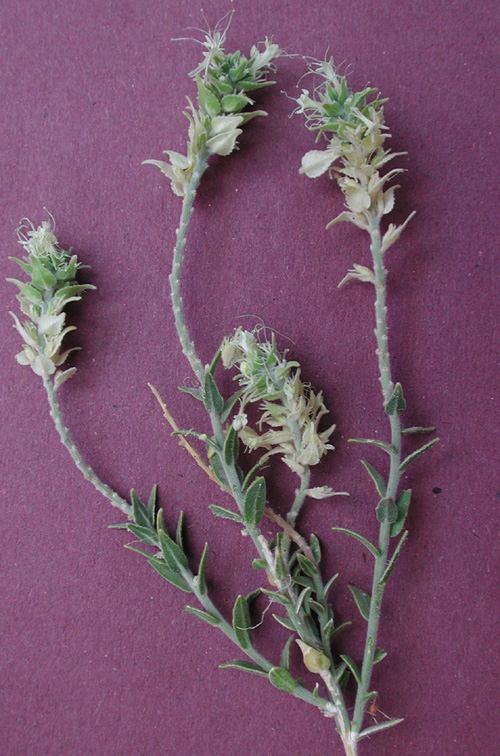
- Petalonyx thurberi

Scientific classification
- Kingdom: Plantae
- Clade: Tracheophytes
- Clade: Angiosperms
- Clade: Eudicots
- Clade: Asterids
- Order: Cornales
- Family: Loasaceae
- Genus: Petalonyx; Gray

Species
- 4-5 - see text

= Petalonyx =

Genus of flowering plants

Petalonyx is a small genus of flowering plants native to the southwestern United States and northern Mexico. They are known commonly as sandpaper plants, and are most often found in warm, dry desert regions. Sandpaper plants are subshrubs that get their common name from their rough foliage, which is covered in tiny, stiffly curved hairs. They bear racemes of claw-shaped flowers with long stamens extending well beyond the corolla, and unusual in that they emerge from outside the corolla.

Species:

- Petalonyx linearis - narrowleaf sandpaper plant
- Petalonyx nitidus - shinyleaf sandpaper plant
- Petalonyx parryi - Parry's sandpaper plant
- Petalonyx thurberi - Thurber's sandpaper plant
- Petalonyx crenatus
