= Preslia =

- Discipline: Botany
- Language: Czech, Slovak, English
- Edited by: Petr Pyšek

Publication details
- History: 1914–present
- Publisher: Czech Botanical Society (Czech Republic)
- Frequency: Quarterly
- Open access: Yes
- License: CC BY 4.0
- Impact factor: 4.4 (2023)

Standard abbreviations
- ISO 4: Preslia

Indexing
- ISSN: 0032-7786 (print); 2570-950X (web)
- OCLC no.: 880576592

Links
- Journal homepage

Preslia is a peer-reviewed scientific journal publishing original research papers on plant systematics, morphology, phytogeography, ecology and vegetation science, with a geographical focus on central Europe. It has been published by the Czech Botanical Society since 1914. The journal is named in honour of Bohemian botanists, brothers Jan Svatopluk Presl (1791–1849) and Karel Bořivoj Presl (1794–1852).
