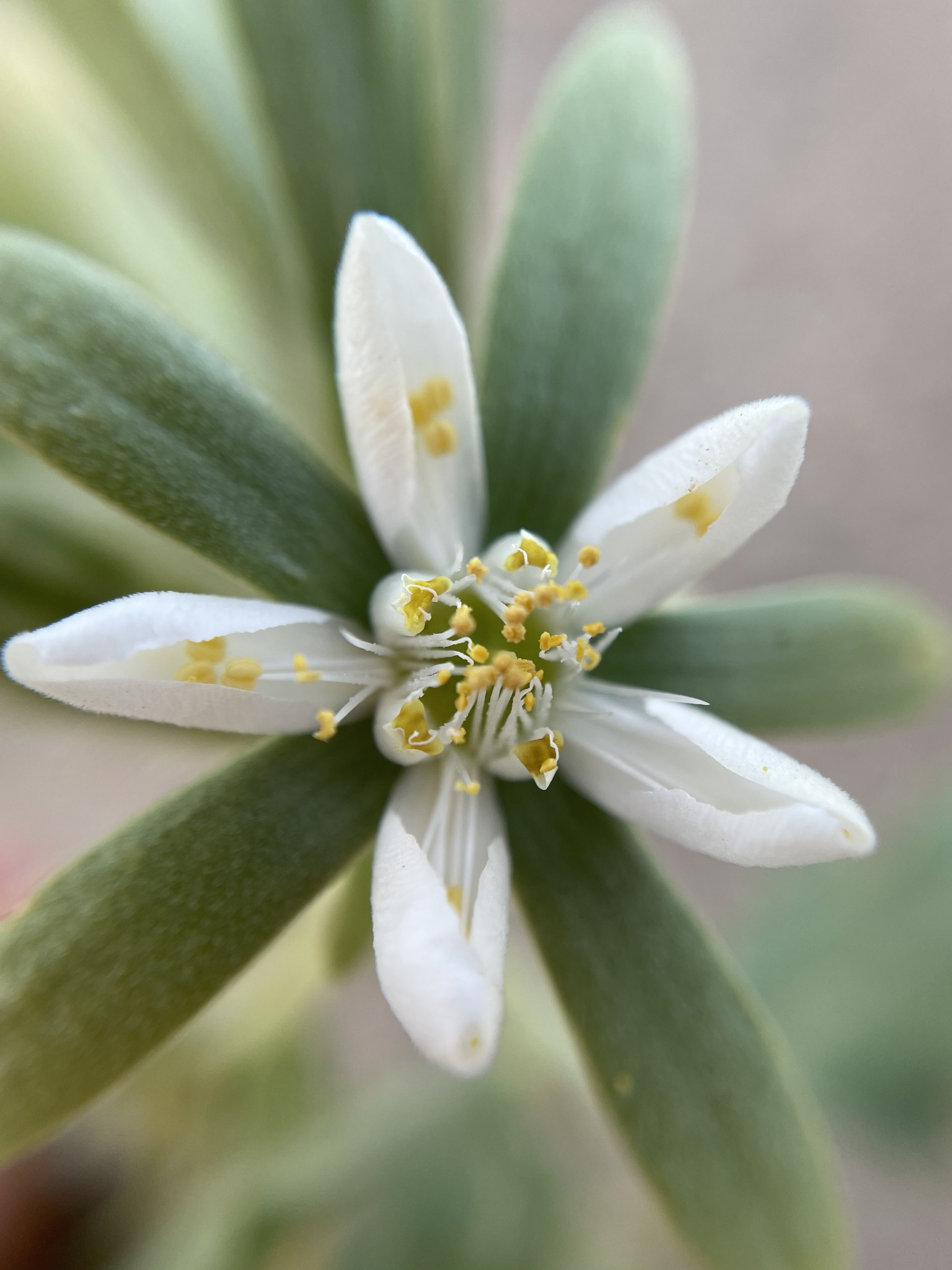
- Kissenia capensis

Scientific classification
- Kingdom: Plantae
- Clade: Tracheophytes
- Clade: Angiosperms
- Clade: Eudicots
- Clade: Asterids
- Order: Cornales
- Family: Loasaceae
- Genus: Kissenia; R.Br. ex Endl.

= Kissenia =

Genus of plants

Kissenia is a genus of flowering plants belonging to the family Loasaceae.

Its native range is from northeastern tropical Africa to the southwestern Arabian Peninsula, and Namibia to South Africa.

Species:

- Kissenia arabica R.Br. ex Chiov.
- Kissenia capensis Endl.
