= Maximilian Weigend =

German botanist

Maximilian Weigend (born September 25, 1969, in Erbendorf) is a German botanist.

== Biography ==
As a student, Weigend received first prize in 1987 and 1989 as part of the Federal President's history competition on the subject of environmental history and in 1992 from the South African Phycological Society for his studies on the phytochemistry of South African macroalgae.

In 1993, he graduated from the South African University of Natal-Pietermaritzburg and then moved to LMU Munich. As part of his research, he traveled to Venezuela, Colombia, Ecuador and Peru before commencing in July 1997 with his dissertation Nasa and the conquest of South America – Systematic Rearrangements in Loasaceae Juss. He received his doctorate degree magna cum laude. As part of this work, Weigend presented a complete revision of the flower nettle family (Loasaceae) and re-described numerous genera and species, but due to a technical error the taxa had to be revalidated in 2006. He received several awards for his dissertation.

From 1999, Weigend began research on the genera Ribes and Desfontainia; in 2000 he became an assistant professor at the Institute for Systematic Botany and Phytogeography at the Free University of Berlin. In 2011 he was appointed to the University of Bonn, where he succeeded Wilhelm Barthlott as director of the Botanical Garden, Bonn . Since then, he has also been deputy director of the Nees Institute for Plant Biodiversity.

Weigend has edited the Loasaceae for several standard works, such as in 2001 for the Flora de Colombia and in 2004 for the sixth volume of the Families and Genera of Vascular Plants.

Weigend is married, and is a father of two children.

- Works by or about Maximilian Weigend at the Internet Archive
