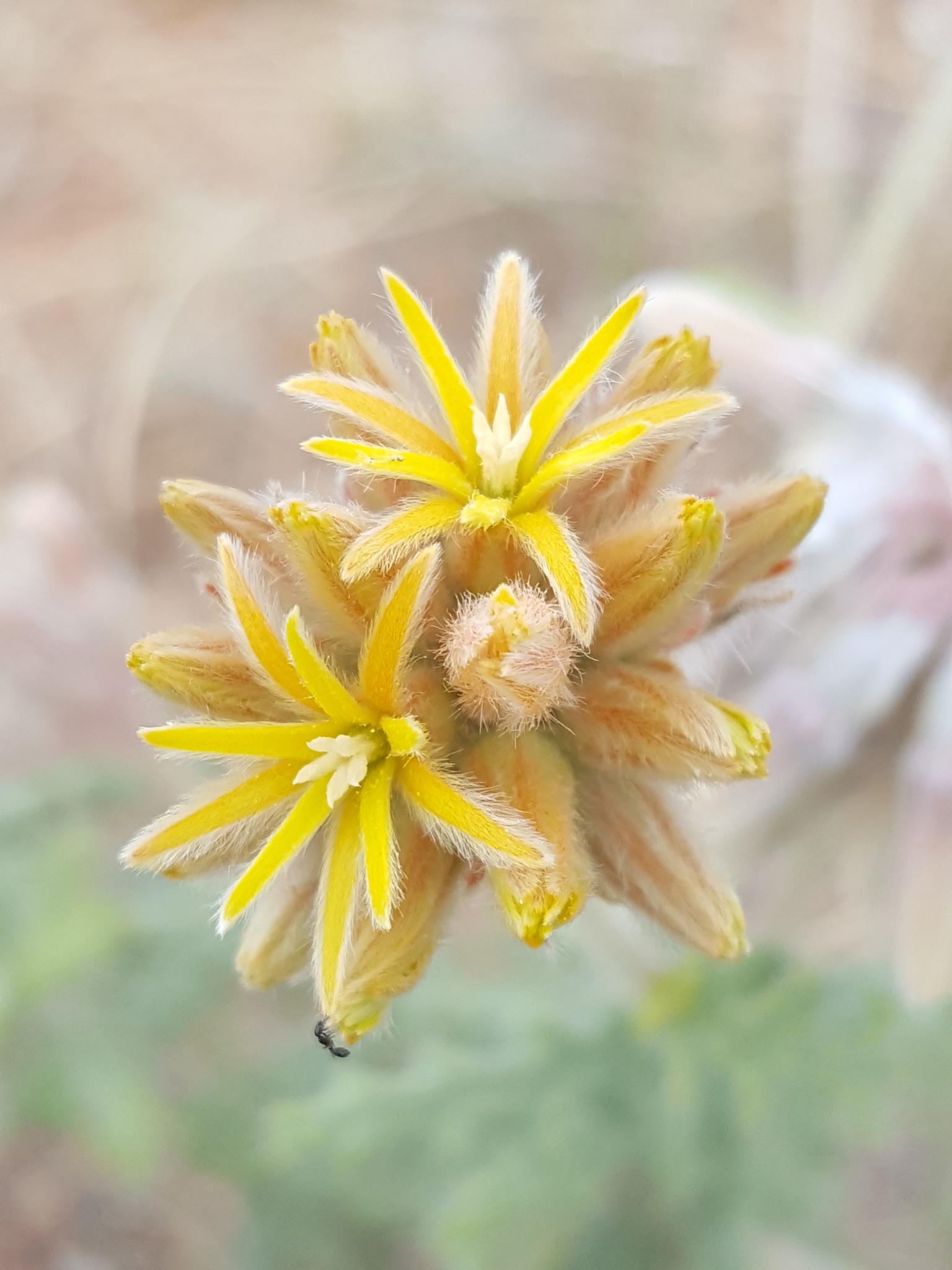

Scientific classification
- Kingdom: Plantae
- Clade: Tracheophytes
- Clade: Angiosperms
- Clade: Eudicots
- Clade: Asterids
- Order: Cornales
- Family: Loasaceae
- Genus: Cevallia; Lag. (1805)
- Species: C. sinuata

Binomial name
- Cevallia sinuata Lag. (1805)

Synonyms
- Cevallia albicans Gand. (1912 publ. 1913); Petalanthera hispida Nutt. (1834)

= Cevallia =

Genus of flowering plants

Cevallia sinuata or stinging serpent is a species of flowering plant belonging to the family Loasaceae. It is a perennial or subshrub native to northern Mexico and the southern central United States from Arizona to Oklahoma. It is the sole species in genus Cevallia.
