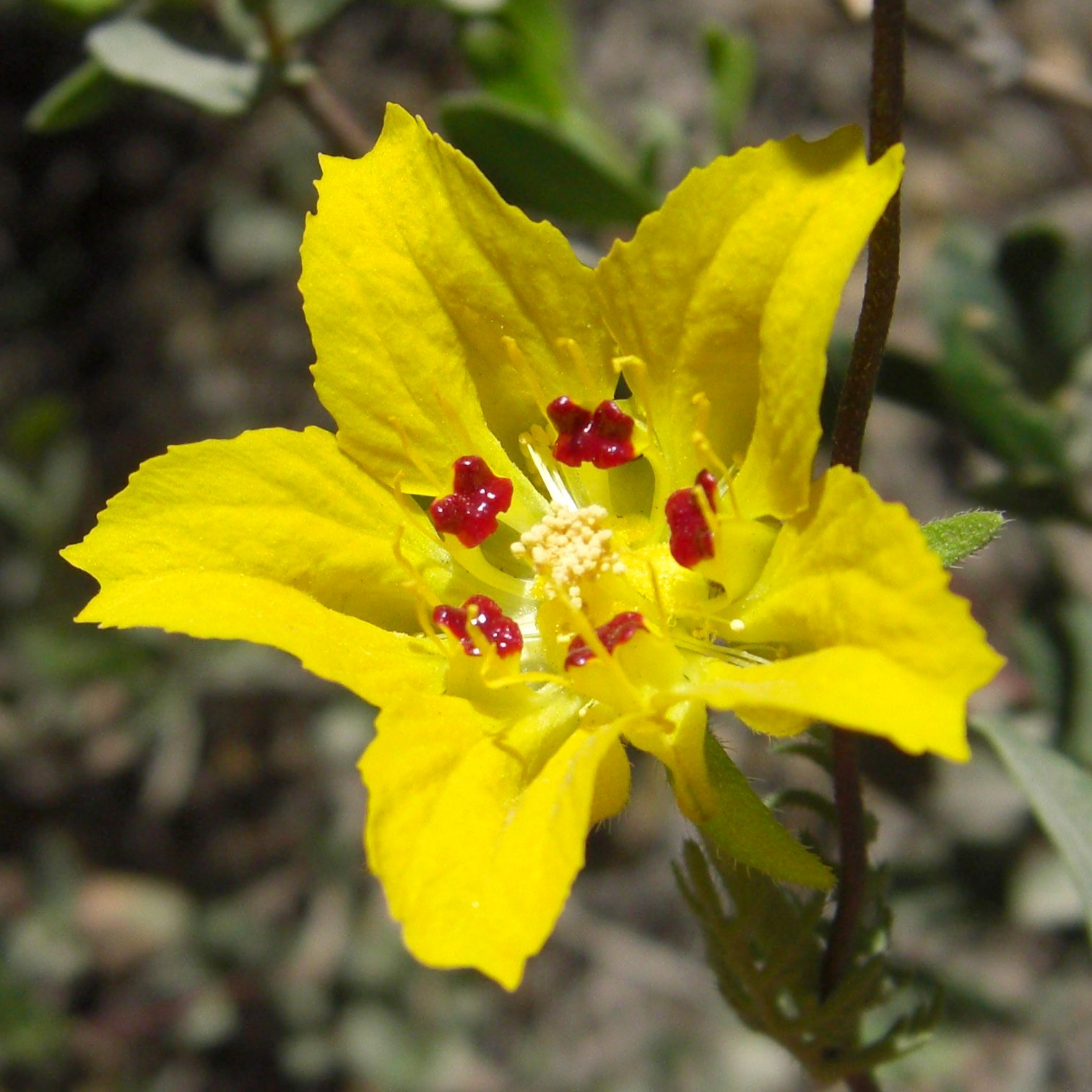
- Scyphanthus stenocarpus

Scientific classification
- Kingdom: Plantae
- Clade: Tracheophytes
- Clade: Angiosperms
- Clade: Eudicots
- Clade: Asterids
- Order: Cornales
- Family: Loasaceae
- Genus: Scyphanthus; Sweet

Species
- See text

Synonyms
- Grammatocarpus C.Presl (1831); Ochetocarpus Meyen (1834)

= Scyphanthus =

Genus of plants

Scyphanthus is a genus of ornamental plants in the family Loasaceae. It includes two species endemic to Central Chile.

- Scyphanthus elegans D.Don
- Scyphanthus stenocarpus (Poepp.) Urb. & Gilg
