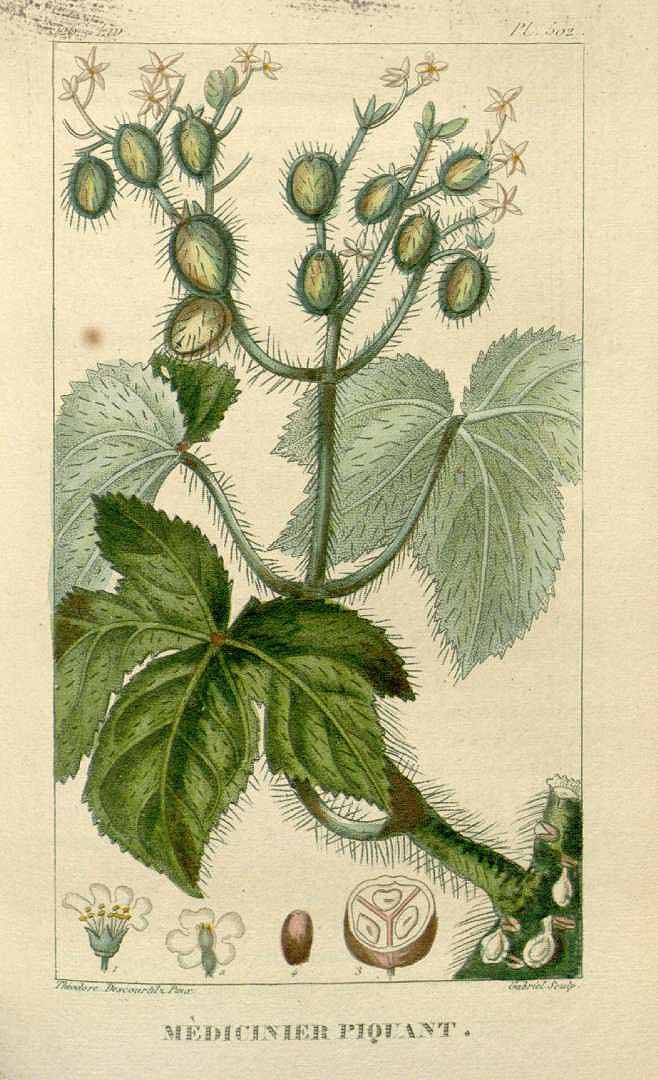
- Cnidoscolus urens by Jean-Theodore Descourtilz

Scientific classification
- Kingdom: Plantae
- Clade: Tracheophytes
- Clade: Angiosperms
- Clade: Eudicots
- Clade: Rosids
- Order: Malpighiales
- Family: Euphorbiaceae
- Genus: Cnidoscolus
- Species: C. urens

Binomial name
- Cnidoscolus urens (L.) Arthur

Synonyms
- Bivonea urens (L.) Arthur; Cnidoscolus michauxii Cham. & Schltdl.; Janipha urens (L.) Poir. ex Pohl; Jatropha urens L.; Jussieuia herbacea Houst.; Manihot urens (L.) Crantz

= Cnidoscolus urens =

Species of plant

Cnidoscolus urens is a perennial, tropical American stinging herb of the family Euphorbiaceae, and is one of some 100 species belonging to the genus Cnidoscolus (from Gk. knidē "nettle", skōlos "thorn", and Latin urens "burning"). The plant is locally known as bull nettle, spurge nettle, pringamosa, bringamosa and mala mujer ("evil woman").

This species has an erect stem and is herbaceous when young, turning woody with age and from 50 to 150 centimeters tall. Leaves are lobed and large, while the white flowers occur in cymes, producing a spiny 3-seeded capsule with seeds rich in fats and proteins, resembling those of Ricinus communis. Its carunculate seeds are usually dispersed by ants (myrmecochory) attracted by the edible elaiosome. The entire plant is covered in stinging hairs, and has a native range covering Central and South America, being found in Costa Rica, El Salvador, Guatemala, Honduras, Mexico, Nicaragua, Panama, Peru, Colombia and Venezuela.

Cnidoscolus urens is monoecious and self-compatible. Its male and female flowers appear superficially similar, but differ structurally. The principal pollinator during the dry season is a butterfly, Eurema daira, which does not discriminate between male and female flowers. Female flowers, making up only some 6% of the total, produce almost no nectar and appear to mimic males in order to receive attention from the pollen- and nectar-gathering insect. Male flowers usually function for only 1 day, while female flowers may remain functional for up to 7 days if unpollinated.

Cnidoscolus was separated from the Linnaean genus Jatropha on the basis of its stinging hairs or trichomes, that consist of a multi-cellular pedestal and a single, elongate, hollow cell with a slightly swollen tip. On being touched, the brittle swollen tip breaks off at an oblique angle, the sharpened end readily penetrates the skin, and the cell contents are injected as if by a hypodermic syringe. This poison leads to great irritation of the skin, a condition which may last several days. If part of the plant is eaten it causes swelling of the lips, flushing of the face, vomiting and even unconsciousness. Its latex is highly corrosive and may produce serious sores.

A study in Costa Rica revealed that larvae of Erinnyis ello, a moth of the family Sphingidae, trim the stinging hairs from the leaf petiole then constrict the vessels supplying latex to the leaf, after which it can safely eat the leaf.

== Ecology ==
Cnidoscolus urens is insect pollinated and is recorded to have been visited in northern Florida by Lasioglossum pectorale and Lasioglossum weemsi/leviense. '
