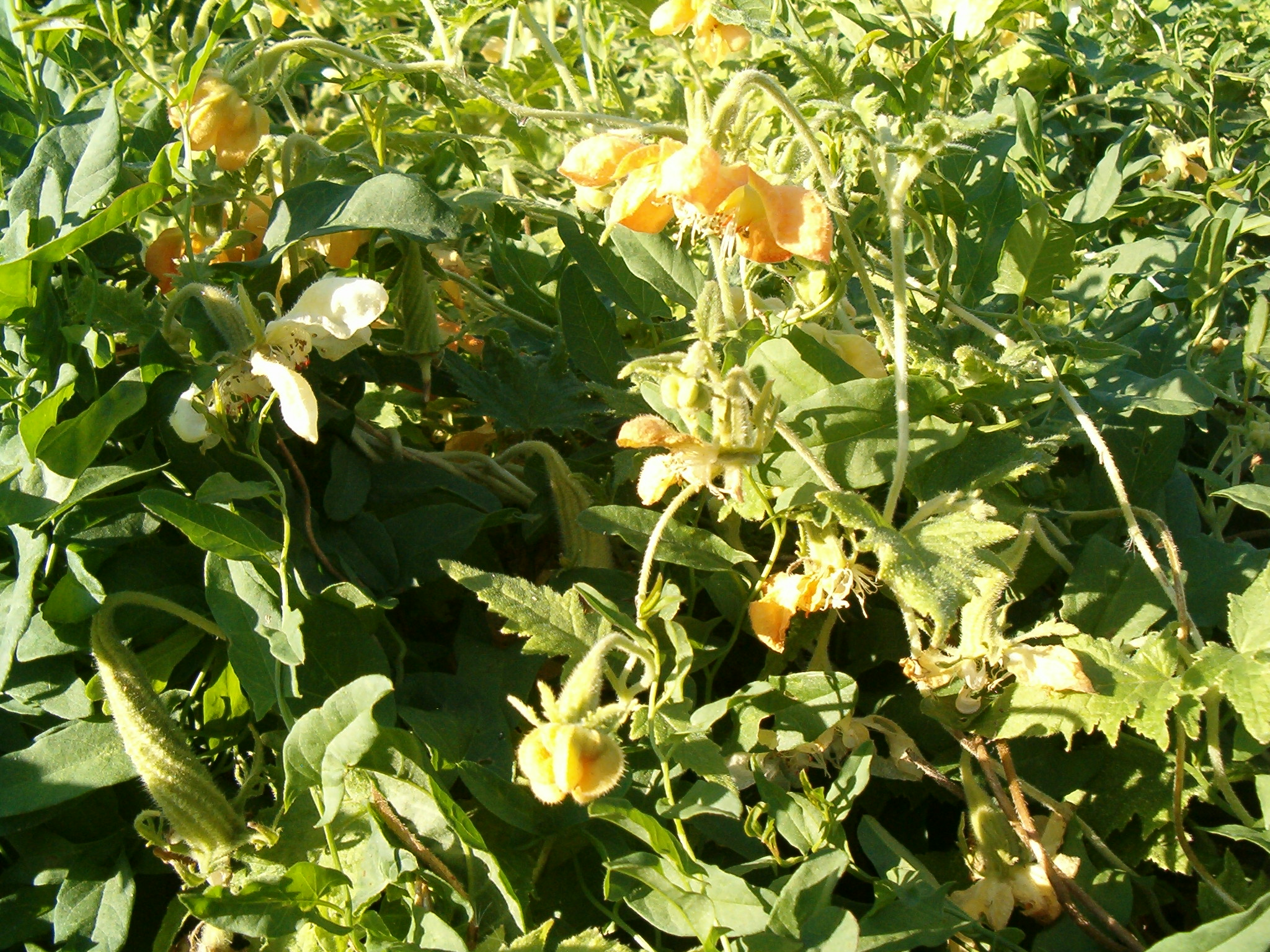

Scientific classification
- Kingdom: Plantae
- Clade: Tracheophytes
- Clade: Angiosperms
- Clade: Eudicots
- Clade: Asterids
- Order: Cornales
- Family: Loasaceae
- Genus: Caiophora; C.Presl

= Caiophora =

Genus of flowering plants

Caiophora is a genus of flowering plants belonging to the family Loasaceae.

Its native range is Western and Southern South America to Southern Brazil.

Species:

- Caiophora aconquijae Sleumer
- Caiophora andina Urb. & Gilg
- Caiophora arechavaletae (Urb.) Urb.
- Caiophora boliviana Urb. & Gilg
- Caiophora buraeavii Urb. & Gilg
- Caiophora canarinoides (Lenné & K.Koch) Urb. & Gilg
- Caiophora carduifolia C.Presl
- Caiophora cernua (Griseb.) Urb. & Gilg ex Kurtz
- Caiophora chuquisacana Urb. & Gilg
- Caiophora chuquitensis (Meyen) Urb. & Gilg
- Caiophora cirsiifolia C.Presl
- Caiophora clavata Urb. & Gilg
- Caiophora contorta (Desr.) C.Presl
- Caiophora coronata (Gillies ex Arn.) Hook. & Arn.
- Caiophora dederichiorum Mark.Ackermann & Weigend
- Caiophora deserticola Weigend & Mark.Ackermann
- Caiophora dumetorum Urb. & Gilg
- Caiophora espigneira (Gay) Urb. & Gilg
- Caiophora hibiscifolia (Griseb.) Urb. & Gilg
- Caiophora lateritia Klotzsch
- Caiophora macrantha Killip
- Caiophora madrequisa Killip
- Caiophora mollis (Griseb.) Urb. & Gilg
- Caiophora nivalis Lillo
- Caiophora patagonica (Speg.) Urb. & Gilg
- Caiophora pedicularifolia Killip
- Caiophora peduncularis (C.Presl) Weigend & Mark.Ackermann
- Caiophora pentlandii (Paxton) Paxton & Lindl.
- Caiophora pterosperma (G.Don) Urb. & Gilg
- Caiophora pulchella Urb. & Gilg
- Caiophora rosulata (Wedd.) Urb. & Gilg
- Caiophora rusbyana Urb. & Gilg ex Rusby
- Caiophora scarlatina Urb. & Gilg
- Caiophora sleumeri Slanis, M.C.Perea & A.Grau
- Caiophora spegazzinii Urb. & Gilg
- Caiophora stenocarpa Urb. & Gilg
- Caiophora tenuis Killip
- Caiophora tomentosula Urb. & Gilg
- Caiophora vargasii Standl. & F.A.Barkley
