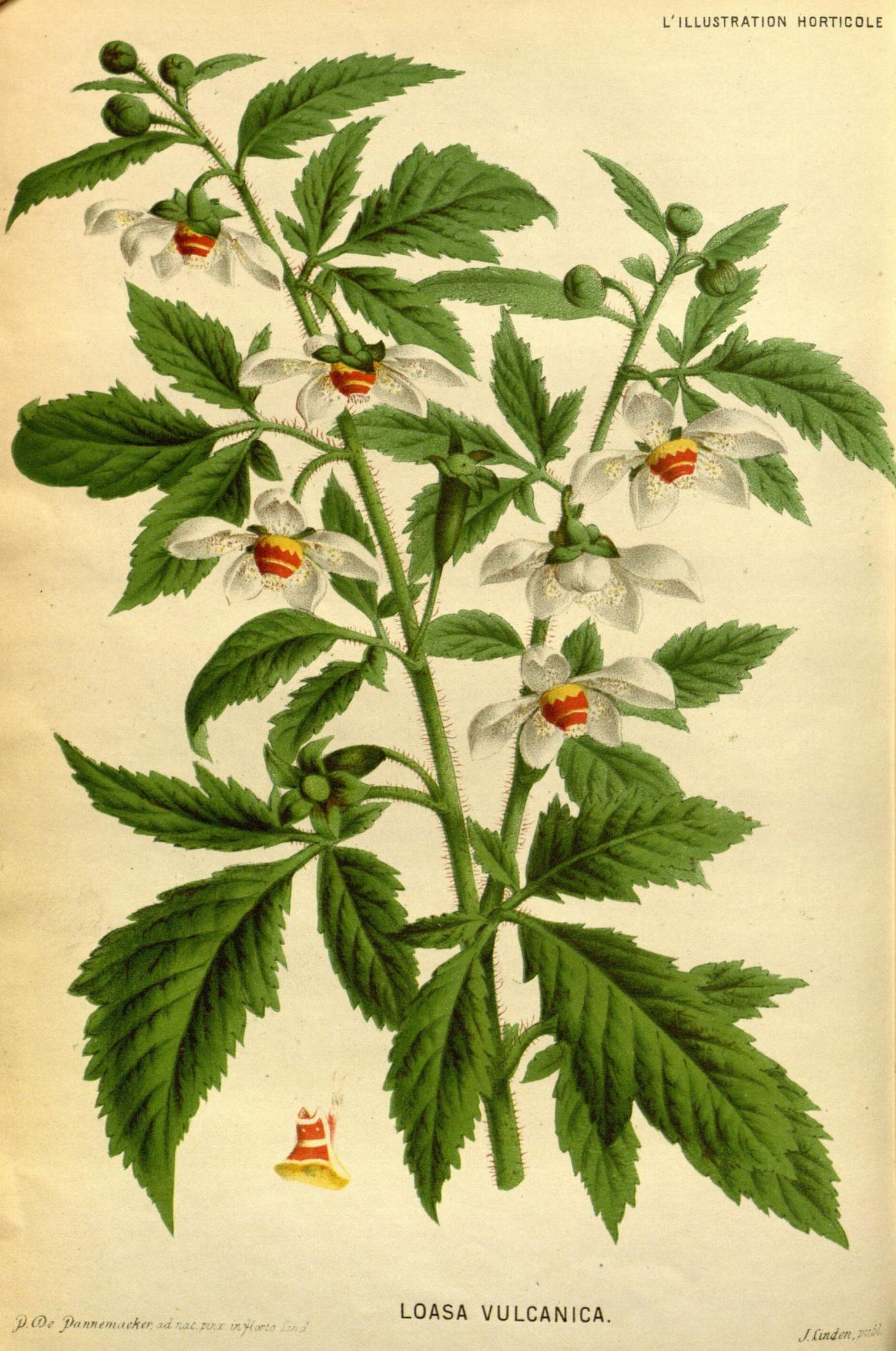
- Loasa vulcanica

Scientific classification
- Kingdom: Plantae
- Clade: Tracheophytes
- Clade: Angiosperms
- Clade: Eudicots
- Clade: Asterids
- Order: Cornales
- Family: Loasaceae; Juss.

Type genus
- Loasa Adans.

Genera
- See text

= Loasaceae =

Family of flowering plants

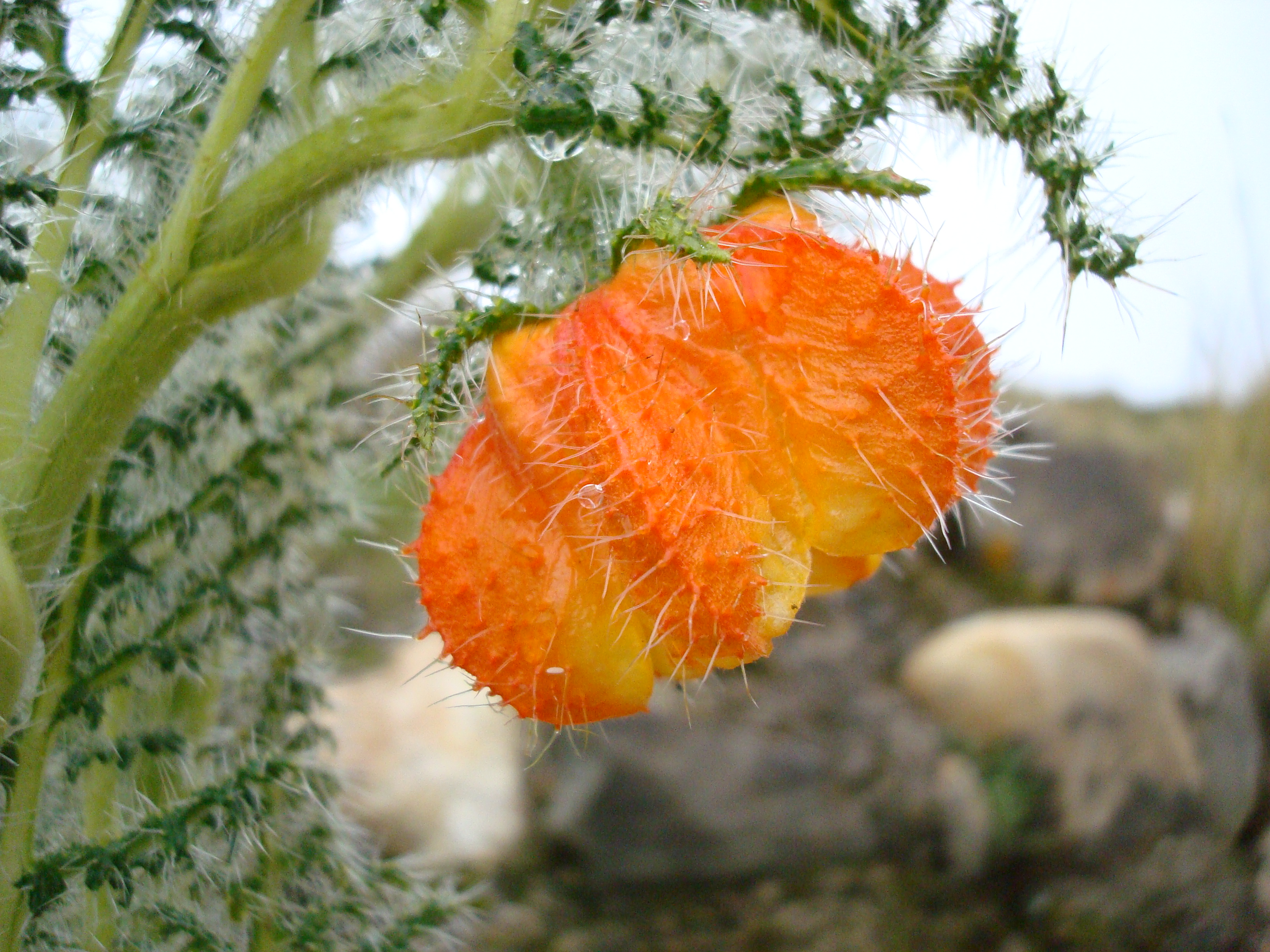
Caiophora

Loasaceae is a family of 15–20 genera and about 200–260 species of flowering plants in the order Cornales, native to the Americas and Africa. Members of the family include annual, biennial and perennial herbaceous plants, and a few shrubs and small trees. Members of the subfamily Loasoideae are known to exhibit rapid thigmonastic stamen movement when pollinators are present.

== Taxonomy ==
In the classification system of Dahlgren the Loasaceae were placed in the order Loasales in the superorder Loasiflorae (also called Loasanae). The Angiosperm Phylogeny Group system places them in the related order Cornales in the asterid clade.

=== Genera ===
21 genera are accepted:

- Aosa Weigend (sometimes included in Loasa)
- Blumenbachia Schrad.
- Caiophora C.Presl
- Cevallia Lag.
- Eucnide Zucc.
- Fuertesia Urb.
- Grausa Weigend & R.H.Acuña
- Gronovia Houst ex L.
- Huidobria Gay (sometimes included in Loasa)
- Kissenia R.Br. ex Endl.
- Klaprothia Kunth
- Loasa Adans.
- Mentzelia Plum ex L.
- Nasa Weigend (sometimes included in Loasa)
- Petalonyx A.Gray
- Pinnasa Weigend & R.H.Acuña
- Plakothira Florence
- Presliophytum (Urb. & Gilg) Weigend (sometimes included in Loasa)
- Schismocarpus S.F.Blake
- Scyphanthus Sweet
- Xylopodia Weigend
