= Mala mujer =

Mala mujer is a common name for several herbaceous plants in the genus Cnidoscolus with stinging hairs and may refer to:

- Cnidoscolus angustidens, native to Arizona and northwestern Mexico
- Cnidoscolus stimulosus, native to the southeastern United States from Louisiana to Virginia
- Cnidoscolus texanus, native to the south central United States

== Music ==
- "Mala Mujer", a song by Spanish recording artist C. Tangana
