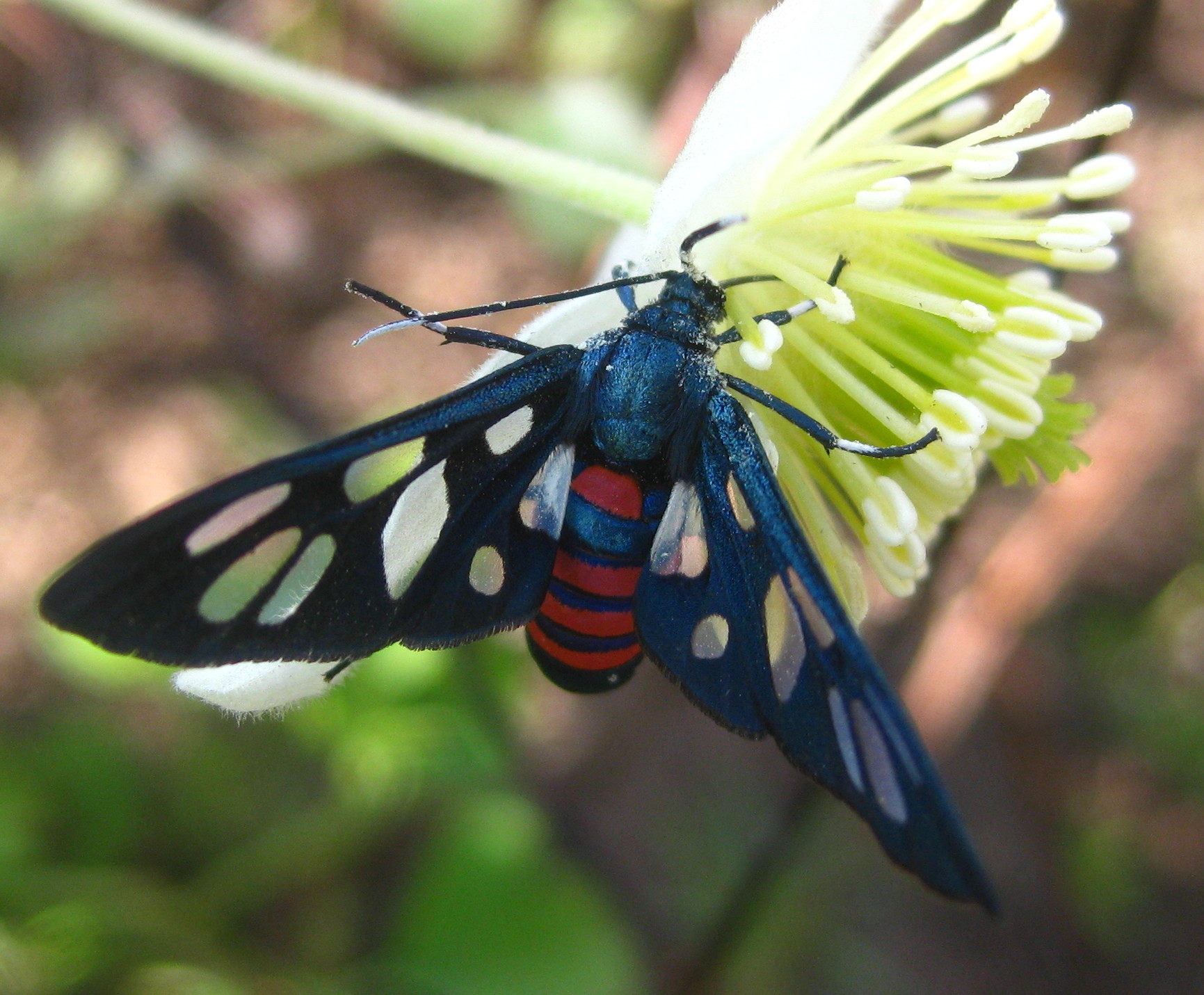

Scientific classification
- Kingdom: Animalia
- Phylum: Arthropoda
- Clade: Pancrustacea
- Class: Insecta
- Order: Lepidoptera
- Superfamily: Noctuoidea
- Family: Erebidae
- Subfamily: Arctiinae
- Genus: Amata
- Species: A. alicia

Binomial name
- Amata alicia (Butler, 1876)

Synonyms
- Zygaena alicia Butler, 1876; Syntomis alicia (Butler, 1876); Syntomis alicia var. apicalis Strand, 1909

= Amata alicia =

Species of insect

Amata alicia is a species of moth of the subfamily Arctiinae. It occurs throughout Africa, from Morocco to South Africa.

The adults look similar to Amata cerbera.

Larvae feed on coffee plants, Bidens pilosa, Cupressus, Dahlia and Manihot glaziovii.

The Amata alicia is commonly found in Angola, Botswana, Burundi, Cameroon, the Democratic Republic of Congo, Ethiopia, Gabon, Kenya, Mozambique, Morocco, Namibia, Nigeria, Rwanda, Somalia, South Africa, Tanzania, Zambia and Zimbabwe.

== Subspecies ==
- Amata alicia alicia
- Amata alicia damarensis (Grünberg, 1910)

Note: Caution with "Amata alicia hoggariensis" [sic] (Alberti & Alberti, 1978) in some online schemes, can be unjustified recombination and subsequent spelling of Amata mogadorensis hoggarensis (Alberti & Alberti, 1978)
