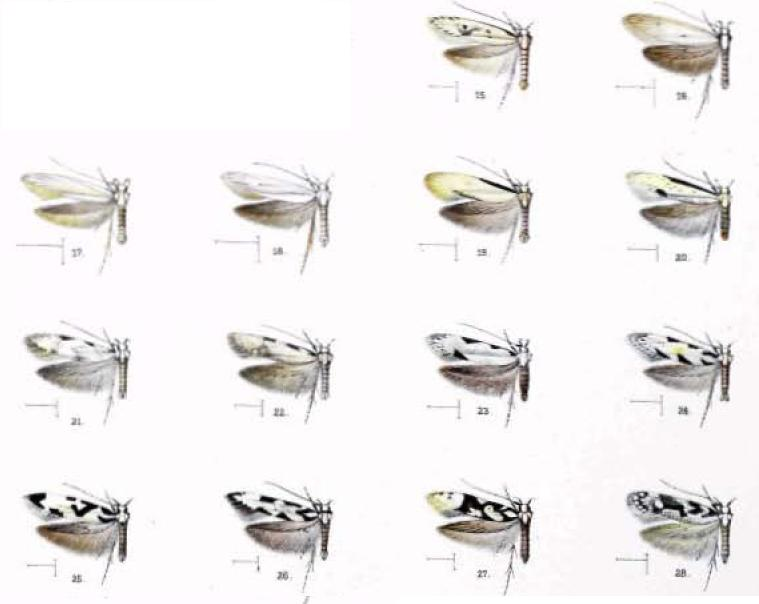
- Illustrations in Fauna Hawaiiensis: I5· Hyposmocoma phantasmatella, 16. Hyposmocoma ossea, 17· Hyposmocoma argentea, 18. Hyposmocoma subargentea, 19· Hyposmocoma lactea, 20. Hyposmocoma lacticretella, 21. Hyposmocoma persimilis, 22. Hyposmocoma trimaculata, 23· Hyposmocoma albonivea, 24· Hyposmocoma carbonentata, 25· Hyposmocoma alliterata, 26. Hyposmocoma nigrodentata, 27. Hyposmocoma obliterata, 28. Hyposmocoma bacillella

Scientific classification
- Domain: Eukaryota
- Kingdom: Animalia
- Phylum: Arthropoda
- Class: Insecta
- Order: Lepidoptera
- Family: Cosmopterigidae
- Genus: Hyposmocoma
- Species: H. lacticretella

Binomial name
- Hyposmocoma lacticretella Walsingham, 1907

= Hyposmocoma lacticretella =

Species of moth

Hyposmocoma lacticretella is a species of moth of the family Cosmopterigidae. It was first described by Lord Walsingham in 1907. It is endemic to the Hawaiian island of Maui. The type locality is Olinda, where it was collected at an elevation of 4,000 feet (1,200 m).
