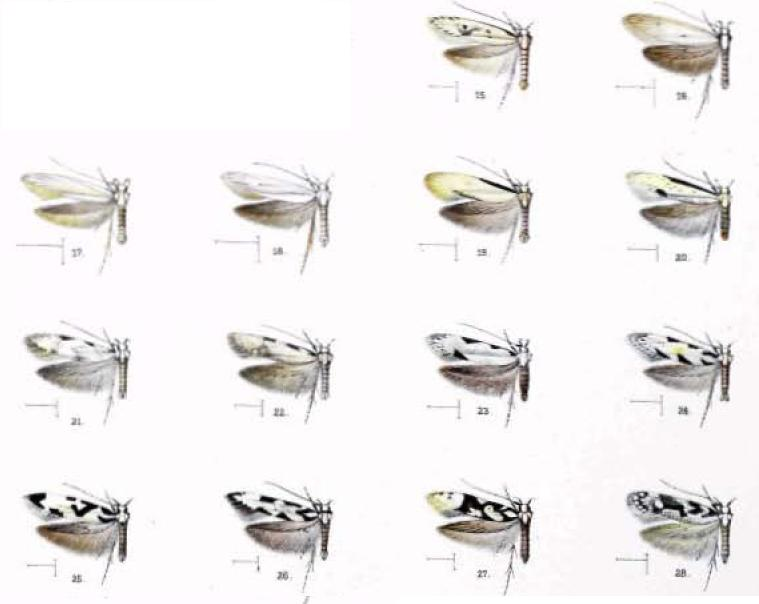
- Illustrations in Fauna Hawaiiensis: I5· Hyposmocoma phantasmatella, 16. Hyposmocoma ossea, 17· Hyposmocoma argentea, 18. Hyposmocoma subargentea, 19· Hyposmocoma lactea, 20. Hyposmocoma lacticretella, 21. Hyposmocoma persimilis, 22. Hyposmocoma trimaculata, 23· Hyposmocoma albonivea, 24· Hyposmocoma carbonentata, 25· Hyposmocoma alliterata, 26. Hyposmocoma nigrodentata, 27. Hyposmocoma obliterata, 28. Hyposmocoma bacillella

Scientific classification
- Domain: Eukaryota
- Kingdom: Animalia
- Phylum: Arthropoda
- Class: Insecta
- Order: Lepidoptera
- Family: Cosmopterigidae
- Genus: Hyposmocoma
- Species: H. lactea

Binomial name
- Hyposmocoma lactea Walsingham, 1907

= Hyposmocoma lactea =

Species of moth

Hyposmocoma lactea is a species of moth of the family Cosmopterigidae. It was first described by Lord Walsingham in 1907. It is endemic to the Hawaiian island of Kauai. The type locality is Halemanu, where it was collected at an elevation of 4,000 feet (1,200 m).
