= M. pentaphylla =

M. pentaphylla may refer to:

- Manihot pentaphylla, a milkspurge native to the Americas
- Mollugo pentaphylla, a herbaceous plant
