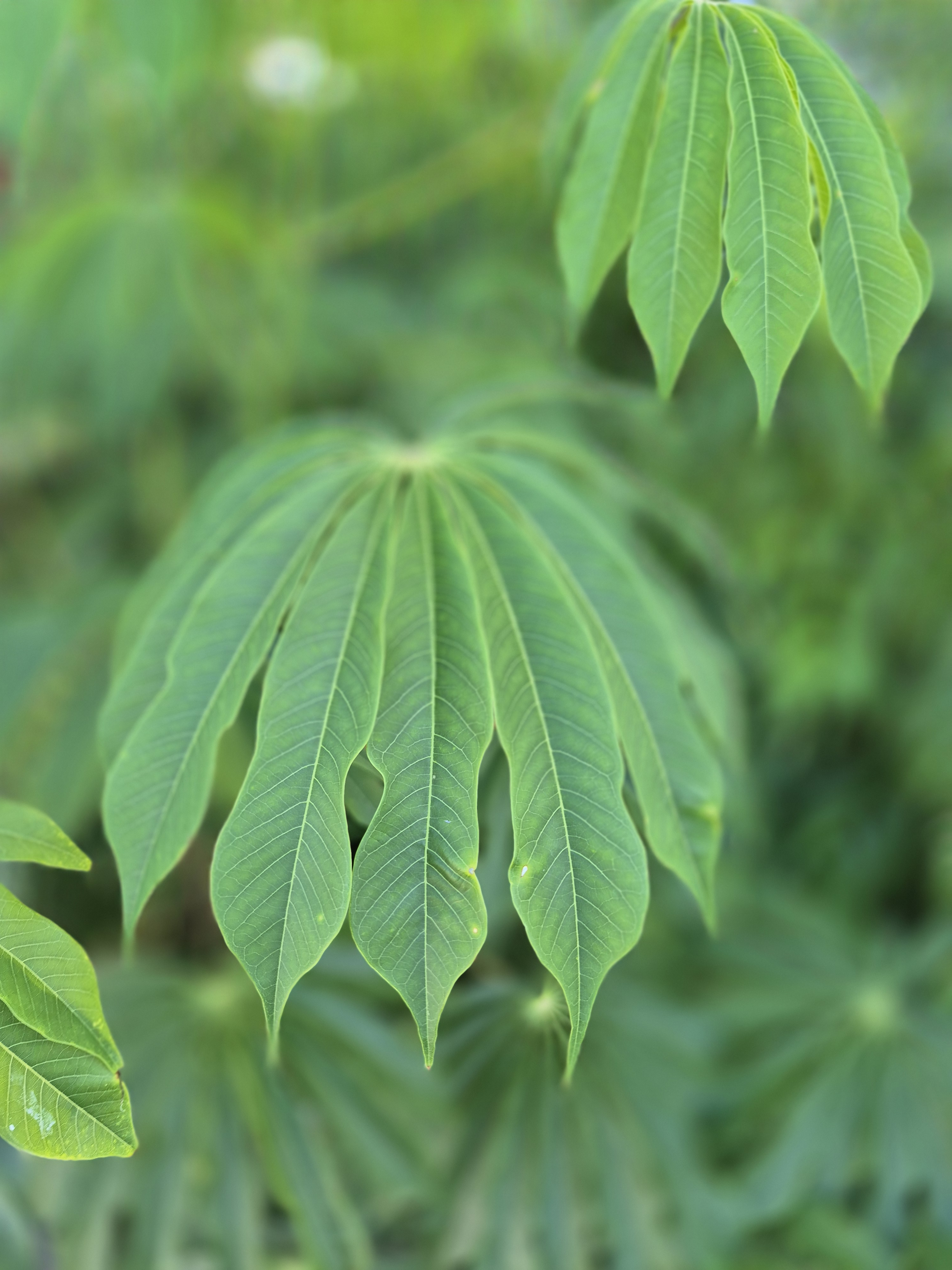
- Typical Manihot leaf (Manihot sp.)

Scientific classification
- Kingdom: Plantae
- Clade: Tracheophytes
- Clade: Angiosperms
- Clade: Eudicots
- Clade: Rosids
- Order: Malpighiales
- Family: Euphorbiaceae
- Subfamily: Crotonoideae
- Tribe: Manihoteae
- Genus: Manihot; Mill. 1754 not Adans. 1763

Type species
- Manihot esculenta Crantz.

Synonyms
- Hotnima A.Chev.; Janipha Kunth; Mandioca Link; Manihotoides D.J.Rogers & Appan

= Manihot =

Genus of trees

Manihot is a genus in the diverse milkspurge family, Euphorbiaceae. It was described as a genus in 1754.

Species of Manihot are monoecious trees, shrubs and a few herbs that are native to the Americas, from Arizona in the United States south to Argentina and Uruguay. The best known member of this genus is the widely cultivated cassava (Manihot esculenta).

Manihot species are used as food plants by the larvae of some species of Lepidoptera including Endoclita sericeus and Hypercompe hambletoni.

Species

1. Manihot acuminatissima Müll.Arg. – Goiás, Bahia
2. Manihot aesculifolia (Kunth) Pohl – Mexico, Central America
3. Manihot alutacea D.J.Rogers & Appan – Goiás
4. Manihot angustiloba (Torr.) Müll.Arg. – Mexico, Arizona
5. Manihot anisophylla (Griseb.) Müll.Arg. – N Argentina
6. Manihot anomala Pohl – South America
7. Manihot attenuata Müll.Arg. - Goiás
8. Manihot auriculata McVaugh – Jalisco, Nayarit
9. Manihot baccata Allem – Fr Guiana, NE Brazil
10. Manihot boliviana Pax & K.Hoffm. - Bolivia
11. Manihot brachyandra Pax & K.Hoffm. – Bahia
12. Manihot brachyloba Müll.Arg. – Central Amer, Dominican Rep, N South America
13. Manihot brachystachys Pax & K.Hoffm. - Brazil
14. Manihot brasiliana Mendoza et al. - Goiás, Brazil
15. Manihot breviloba – Sergipe
16. Manihot caerulescens Pohl – Brazil, Paraguay
17. Manihot carthagenensis (Jacq.) Müll.Arg. – N South America, Trinidad, Curaçao
18. Manihot catingae Ule – Bahia, Minas Gerais
19. Manihot caudata Greenm. – N Mexico
20. Manihot cecropiifolia – Goiás, Distrito Federal
21. Manihot chlorosticta Standl. & Goldman – Mexico
22. Manihot compositifolia Allem – Bahia
23. Manihot condensata D.J.Rogers & Appan – Bolivia
24. Manihot congesta Mendoza et al. - Goiás, Brazil
25. Manihot corymbiflora Pax & K.Hoffm. – Rio de Janeiro
26. Manihot crassisepala Pax & K.Hoffm. – México State, Morelos, Jalisco
27. Manihot crotalariiformis Pohl – Minas Gerais
28. Manihot davisiae Croizat – Arizona, Sonora, Chihuahua, Sinaloa
29. Manihot diamantinensis Allem – Bahia
30. Manihot dichotoma Ule – NE Brazil
31. Manihot divergens Pohl – Goiás, Distrito Federal, Minas Gerais
32. Manihot epruinosa Pax & K.Hoffm. – Piauí, Ceará, Paraíba, Pernambuco, Bahia
33. Manihot esculenta Crantz – from Mexico to Brazil
34. Manihot falcata D.J.Rogers & Appan – Goiás, Distrito Federal
35. Manihot filamentosa Pittier – NW Venezuela
36. Manihot flemingiana D.J.Rogers & Appan – Mato Grosso
37. Manihot foetida (Kunth) Pohl – C + N Mexico
38. Manihot fortalezensis Nassar, D.G.Ribeiro, Bomfim & P.T.C.Gomes – Ceará
39. Manihot fruticulosa (Pax) D.J.Rogers & Appan – Brazil
40. Manihot gabrielensis Allem – Goiás
41. Manihot gracilis Pohl – Paraguay, Brazil
42. Manihot grahamii Hook. – S Brazil, N Argentina, Paraguay, Uruguay
43. Manihot guaranitica Chodat & Hassl. – N Argentina, Paraguay, Bolivia
44. Manihot handroana Cruz – Minas Gerais
45. Manihot hassleriana – Paraguay
46. Manihot heptaphylla Ule – Bahia
47. Manihot hilariana Baill. – Minas Gerais
48. Manihot hunzikeriana Mart.Crov. – Rio Grande do Sul, Misiones
49. Manihot incisa - Goiás, Brazil
50. Manihot inflata Müll.Arg. – São Paulo, Rio de Janeiro, Paraná
51. Manihot irwinii D.J.Rogers & Appan – Goiás
52. Manihot jacobinensis Müll.Arg. – Mato Grosso, Bahia
53. Manihot janiphoides Müll.Arg. – São Paulo, Minas Gerais
54. Manihot jolyana Cruz – São Paulo
55. Manihot leptophylla Pax – NW South America
56. Manihot longepetiolata Pohl – Goiás, Minas Gerais
57. Manihot maracasensis Ule – Bahia
58. Manihot marajoara Huber – Pará, Amapá
59. Manihot mcvaughii V.W.Steinm. – Michoacán
60. Manihot membranacea Pax & K.Hoffm. – Mato Grosso
61. Manihot michaelis McVaugh – Colima, Jalisco
62. Manihot mirabilis Pax – Paraguay
63. Manihot mossamedensis Taub. – Goiás
64. Manihot nana Müll.Arg. – Goiás, Minas Gerais
65. Manihot neusana Nassar – Paraná
66. Manihot nogueirae Allem – Distrito Federal
67. Manihot oaxacana D.J.Rogers & Appan – Oaxaca
68. Manihot obovata J.Jiménez Ram. – Guerrero
69. Manihot oligantha Pax & K.Hoffm. – Goiás
70. Manihot orbicularis Pohl – Goiás
71. Manihot palmata Müll.Arg. – Rio de Janeiro
72. Manihot pauciflora Brandegee – Puebla, Oaxaca
73. Manihot paviifolia Pohl – Goiás
74. Manihot peltata Pohl – Goiás
75. Manihot pentaphylla Pohl – Brazil, Paraguay
76. Manihot peruviana Müll.Arg. – Loreto, San Martin
77. Manihot pilosa Pohl – E Brazil
78. Manihot pinatiloba Goiás, Brazil
79. Manihot pohliana Müll.Arg. – Bahia
80. Manihot pohlii Wawra – Espírito Santo, Rio de Janeiro
81. Manihot populifolia Pax – Paraguay
82. Manihot porphyrantha Goiás, Brazil
83. Manihot pringlei S.Watson – Tamaulipas, San Luis Potosí, Querétaro
84. Manihot procumbens Müll.Arg. – Minas Gerais, São Paulo, Paraguay
85. Manihot pruinosa Pohl – Mato Grosso, Goiás
86. Manihot pseudoglaziovii Pax & K.Hoffm. – Ceará, Pernambuco, Rio Grande do Norte, Paraíba
87. Manihot pulchrifolius M.J. Silva – Brazil
88. Manihot purpureocostata Pohl – Goiás
89. Manihot pusilla Pohl – Goiás
90. Manihot quinquefolia Pohl – Bahia
91. Manihot quinqueloba Pohl – Mato Grosso, Goiás
92. Manihot quinquepartita Huber ex D.J.Rogers & Appan – Amapá, Pará, Maranhão, Mato Grosso
93. Manihot reniformis Pohl – Bahia
94. Manihot reptans Pax – Goiás, Minas Gerais
95. Manihot rhomboidea Müll.Arg. – Mexico, Central America
96. Manihot rubricaulis I.M.Johnst. – Mexico
97. Manihot sagittatopartita Pohl – Bahia, Goiás, Minas Gerais
98. Manihot salicifolia Pohl – Mato Grosso, Goiás
99. Manihot sparsifolia Pohl – Goiás
100. Manihot stipularis Pax – Distrito Federal, Goiás
101. Manihot stricta Baill. – Peru, Mato Grosso, Goiás
102. Manihot subspicata Rogers & Appan – Coahuila, Nuevo León, Tamaulipas
103. Manihot surinamensis D.J.Rogers & Appan – Venezuela, the 3 Guianas
104. Manihot tenella Müll.Arg. – São Paulo, Paraguay
105. Manihot tomatophylla Standl. – Morelos, Jalisco, Michoacán
106. Manihot tomentosa Pohl – Goiás, Minas Gerais
107. Manihot triloba (Sessé) McVaugh ex Miranda – Mexico
108. Manihot tripartita (Spreng.) Müll.Arg. – Brazil, Paraguay
109. Manihot triphylla Pohl – Distrito Federal, Goiás, Minas Gerais
110. Manihot tristis Müll.Arg. – Venezuela, the 3 Guianas, N Brazil
111. Manihot variifolia Pax & K.Hoffm. – Paraguay
112. Manihot violacea Pohl – Brazil
113. Manihot walkerae Croizat – Texas, Tamaulipas
114. Manihot websteri D.J.Rogers & Appan – Puebla, Oaxaca
115. Manihot weddelliana Baill. – Goiás
116. Manihot xavantinensis D.J.Rogers & Appan – Mato Grosso
117. Manihot zehntneri Ule – Bahia

variety treated as a species

1. Manihot carthaginensis subsp. glaziovii = Manihot glaziovii (Müll.Arg.) Allem

formerly included

moved to Aleurites Cnidoscolus Jatropha

1. M. curcas – Jatropha curcas
2. M. diversifolia – Jatropha diversifolia
3. M. gossypiifolia – Jatropha gossypiifolia
4. M. herbacea – Cnidoscolus urens
5. M. moluccana – Aleurites moluccanus
6. M. multifida – Jatropha multifida
7. M. spinosissima – Cnidoscolus vitifolius
8. M. urens – Cnidoscolus urens

== Pollination ==
Monoecy was demonstrated by Jennings 1963 and George & Shifriss 1967.
