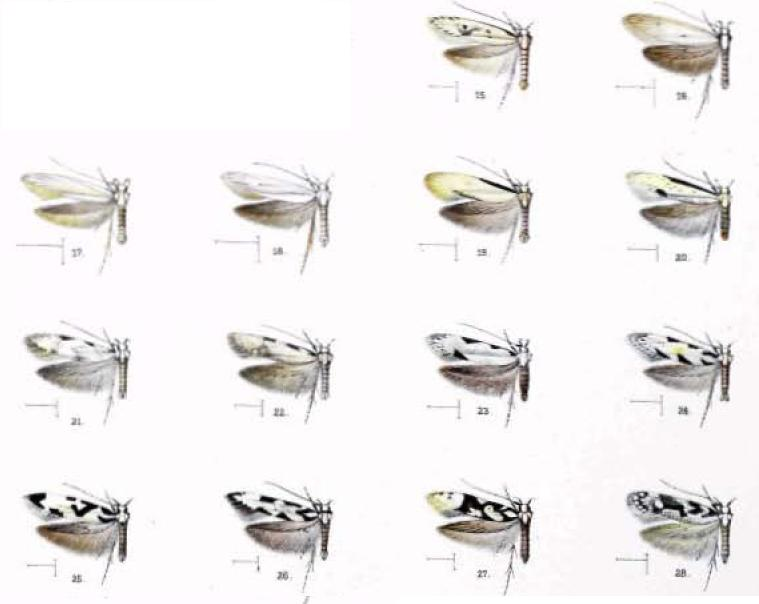
- Illustrations in Fauna Hawaiiensis: I5· Hyposmocoma phantasmatella, 16. Hyposmocoma ossea, 17· Hyposmocoma argentea, 18. Hyposmocoma subargentea, 19· Hyposmocoma lactea, 20. Hyposmocoma lacticretella, 21. Hyposmocoma persimilis, 22. Hyposmocoma trimaculata, 23· Hyposmocoma albonivea, 24· Hyposmocoma carbonentata, 25· Hyposmocoma alliterata, 26. Hyposmocoma nigrodentata, 27. Hyposmocoma obliterata, 28. Hyposmocoma bacillella

Scientific classification
- Kingdom: Animalia
- Phylum: Arthropoda
- Clade: Pancrustacea
- Class: Insecta
- Order: Lepidoptera
- Family: Cosmopterigidae
- Genus: Hyposmocoma
- Species: H. persimilis

Binomial name
- Hyposmocoma persimilis Walsingham, 1907

= Hyposmocoma persimilis =

Species of moth

Hyposmocoma persimilis is a species of moth of the family Cosmopterigidae. It was first described by Lord Walsingham in 1907. It is endemic to the island of Hawaii. The type locality is Kona.
