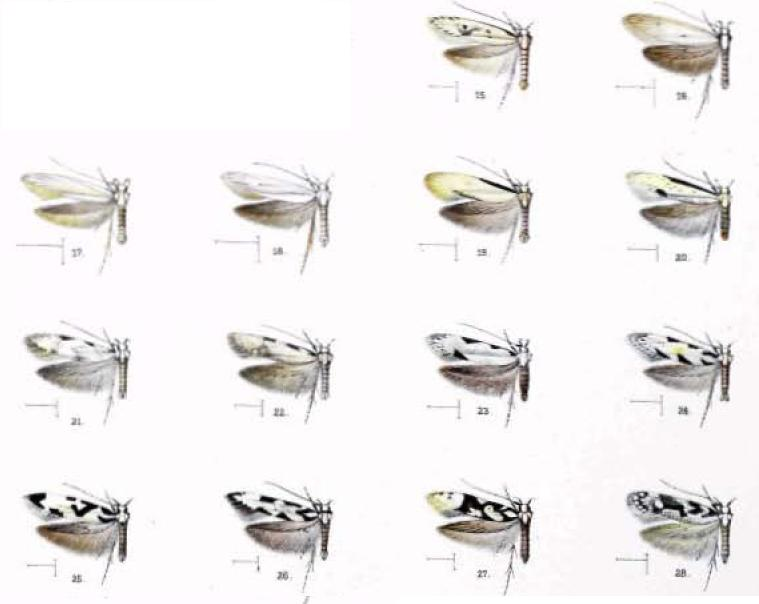
- Illustrations in Fauna Hawaiiensis: I5· Hyposmocoma phantasmatella, 16. Hyposmocoma ossea, 17· Hyposmocoma argentea, 18. Hyposmocoma subargentea, 19· Hyposmocoma lactea, 20. Hyposmocoma lacticretella, 21. Hyposmocoma persimilis, 22. Hyposmocoma trimaculata, 23· Hyposmocoma albonivea, 24· Hyposmocoma carbonentata, 25· Hyposmocoma alliterata, 26. Hyposmocoma nigrodentata, 27. Hyposmocoma obliterata, 28. Hyposmocoma bacillella

Scientific classification
- Domain: Eukaryota
- Kingdom: Animalia
- Phylum: Arthropoda
- Class: Insecta
- Order: Lepidoptera
- Family: Cosmopterigidae
- Genus: Hyposmocoma
- Species: H. bacillella

Binomial name
- Hyposmocoma bacillella Walsingham, 1907

= Hyposmocoma bacillella =

Species of moth

Hyposmocoma bacillella is a species of moth of the family Cosmopterigidae. It was first described by Lord Walsingham in 1907. It is endemic to the Hawaiian island of Kauai. The type localities are Halemanu and Kaholuamano, where it was collected at an elevation of 4,000 feet (1,200 m).

The larvae feed on Metrosideros species.

It lives in an elongate conical case, with overlapping lip at the anterior end, the narrower posterior end being obtuse and the whole case having much the appearance of a piece of birch bark, but somewhat darker on the upper than on the under side, the division between the darker and lighter portions being straight and clearly defined. For pupation the case is attached by a short, stiff, thick silken stem from the middle of its underlip to the midrib of the leaf. The case is suspended parallel with the plane of the leaf, two or three fine silk threads attaching its anal extremity to the leaf.

— Walsingham, 1907:602
