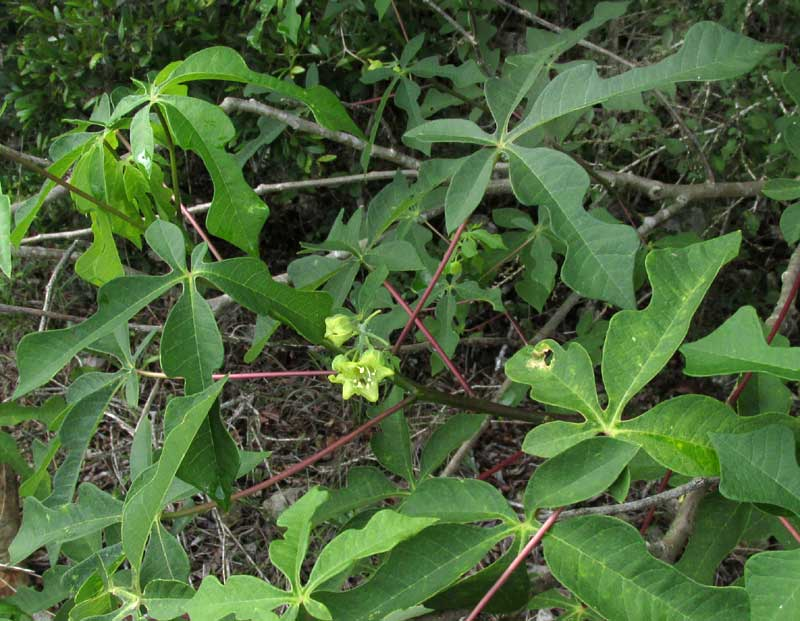
- Manihot aesculifolia leaves and flowers

Scientific classification
- Kingdom: Plantae
- Clade: Tracheophytes
- Clade: Angiosperms
- Clade: Eudicots
- Clade: Rosids
- Order: Malpighiales
- Family: Euphorbiaceae
- Genus: Manihot
- Species: M. aesculifolia

Binomial name
- Manihot aesculifolia (Kunth) Pohl

Synonyms
- List: Janipha aesculifolia Kunth; Janipha aesculifolia (Kunth) Steud; Manihot gualanensis S.F. Blake; Manihot intermedia Weath.; Manihot olfersiana Pax

= Manihot aesculifolia =

Species of plant

Manihot aesculifolia, commonly known as buckeye-leafed cassava, is a tuberous shrub or tree native from Mexico south through Central America, in seasonal tropical forests. Its tubers are edible, but not as productive as the extensively cultivated cassava, or manioc. This is a "wild cassava."

== Description ==
Here are noteworthy features of Manihot aesculifolia:

- Stems up to 7 m (23 ft) tall produce large tubers which are brown, rough and flaky, but which inside are creamy white. All parts of the plant are hairless, and exude a milk sap when injured.
- Leaves arise singly along the stem on petioles up to 20 cm (7.9 in) long, with blades up 30 cm (12 in) in length and up to 10 cm (3.9 in) wide. Blades are very deeply lobed into 5-9 parts radiating outward from the point of attachment with the petiole.
- Inflorescences usually are much-branched panicles at the tips of stems. They are up to 45 cm (18 in) long, and bear both male and female flowers, which are interspersed.
- Male flowers bearing corolla-like tepals about 13 mm (1/2 in) long range in color from pure greenish yellow to various purple hues. The tepals are divided shallowly divided into 5 lobes. Ten stamens are up to 9 mm (3/8 in) long. Female flowers, nearly the same size, lack the stamens, but do have a plump pistil about 6 mm (1/4 in) long conspicuously topped with a 3-lobed stigma; these parts are missing in male flowers.
- Capsular-type fruits, arranged in long clusters, are green, slightly warty, almost spherical, and about 15 mm (5/8 in) across. They arise from pedicels about 1 cm (3/8 in) long, which are slightly curved downwards.
- Oblong seeds are about 1.5 cm (5/8 in) long, a bit thin and flat, with the top side bearing conspicuous horizontal stripes. There's a broad, prominent caruncle, a kind of elaiosome, attached to the seed.

== Distribution ==
Manihot aesculifolia is native to Mexico and all countries of Central America.

== Habitat ==
In Mexico's Yucatan Peninsula, Manihot aesculifolia inhabits low- and medium-height seasonal tropical forest. On Mexico's Pacific coast, in the state of Colima, it inhabits tropical forests with deciduous leaves. In Nicaragua's Pacific side it is common in tropical deciduous forests and spiny scrub up to 1,000 m (3,300 ft) in elevation.

== As human food ==
=== In home gardens ===
In Mexico's Yucatan Peninsula, Maya and mestizo communities often grow Manihot aesculifolia in home gardens.

=== As naturally occurring food ===
The "Zero Hunger Challenge" web page of the United Nations' Food and Agriculture Organization lists Manihot aesculifolia, as its first example of the importance of forests in food security. The tubers of the species are gathered widely.

== Taxonomy ==
In 1817, Manihot aesculifolia was first formally described under the name Janipha aesculifolia, by Carl Sigismund Kunth, who dealt with specimens collected by Alexander von Humboldt and Aimé Bonpland during their American Expedition of 1799–1804. Accompanying the description was the remark that the taxon grew on the shore of the Bay of Campeche : "Crescit in litore Sinus Campechensis". Humboldt and Bonpland had visited the Bay of Compeche as they exited Mexico at Veracruz in early 1804. The taxon Manihot aesculifolia was established by Johann Baptist Emanuel Pohl in 1827 when he transferred Junipha aesculifoia Humb. et Bonpl. to the genus Manihot.

=== Phylogeny ===
Before genetic analysis of species, on the basis of morphological characters, Manihot aesculifolia was thought to be the origin of the widely cultivated cassava, Manihot esculenta, also called manioc. However, phylogenetic analysis using molecular markers suggests a possible domestication of cassava from taxa in Brazil.

=== Etymology ===
The genus name Manihot derives from the Tupi-Guarani name manioca, which means "cassava".

The species name aesculifolia is based on the genus Aesculus. The -folia part is a borrowing from the Latin folium, meaning "leaf." Therefore, "like leaves of the genus Aesculus", among whose species are the buckeyes giving rise to the English name.

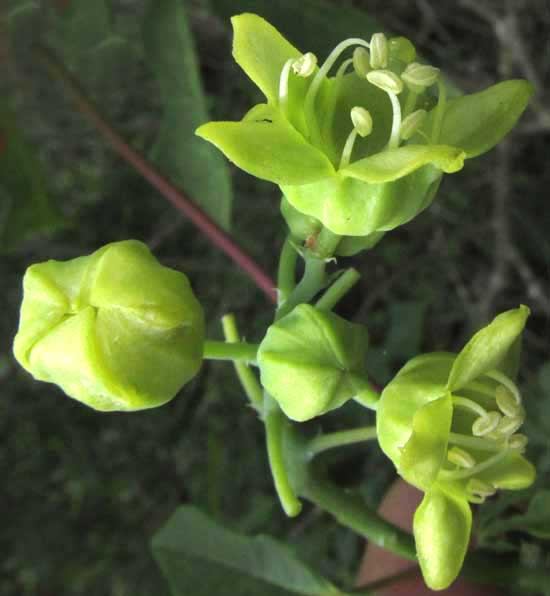
Male flowers

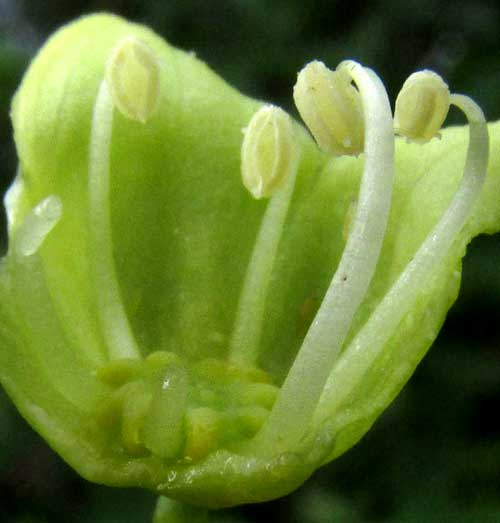
Dissected male flower

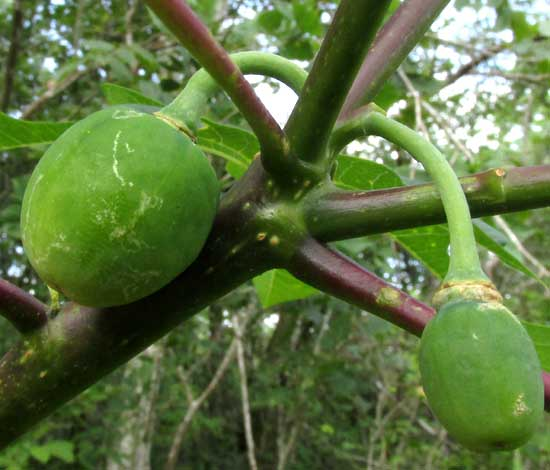
Immature fruits

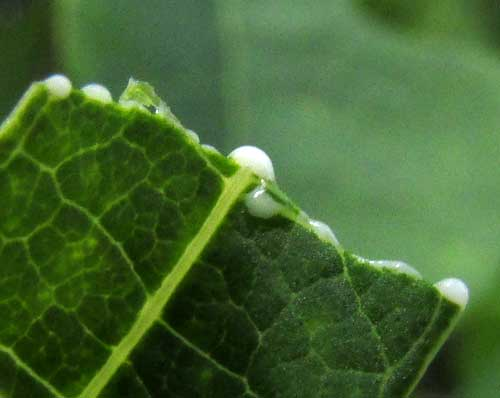
Milky sap exuding from torn leaf
