= Cnidoscolus regina =

Conservation status
- Critically Endangered (IUCN 3.1)

Scientific classification
- Kingdom: Plantae
- Clade: Embryophytes
- Clade: Tracheophytes
- Clade: Spermatophytes
- Clade: Angiosperms
- Clade: Eudicots
- Clade: Rosids
- Order: Malpighiales
- Family: Euphorbiaceae
- Genus: Cnidoscolus
- Species: C. regina

Binomial name
- Cnidoscolus regina (León) Radcl.-Sm. & Govaerts

Synonyms
- Jatropha regina León; Victorinia regina (León) León

Species of flowering plant

Cnidoscolus regina is a species of flowering plant in the family Euphorbiaceae. It is endemic to Cuba.
