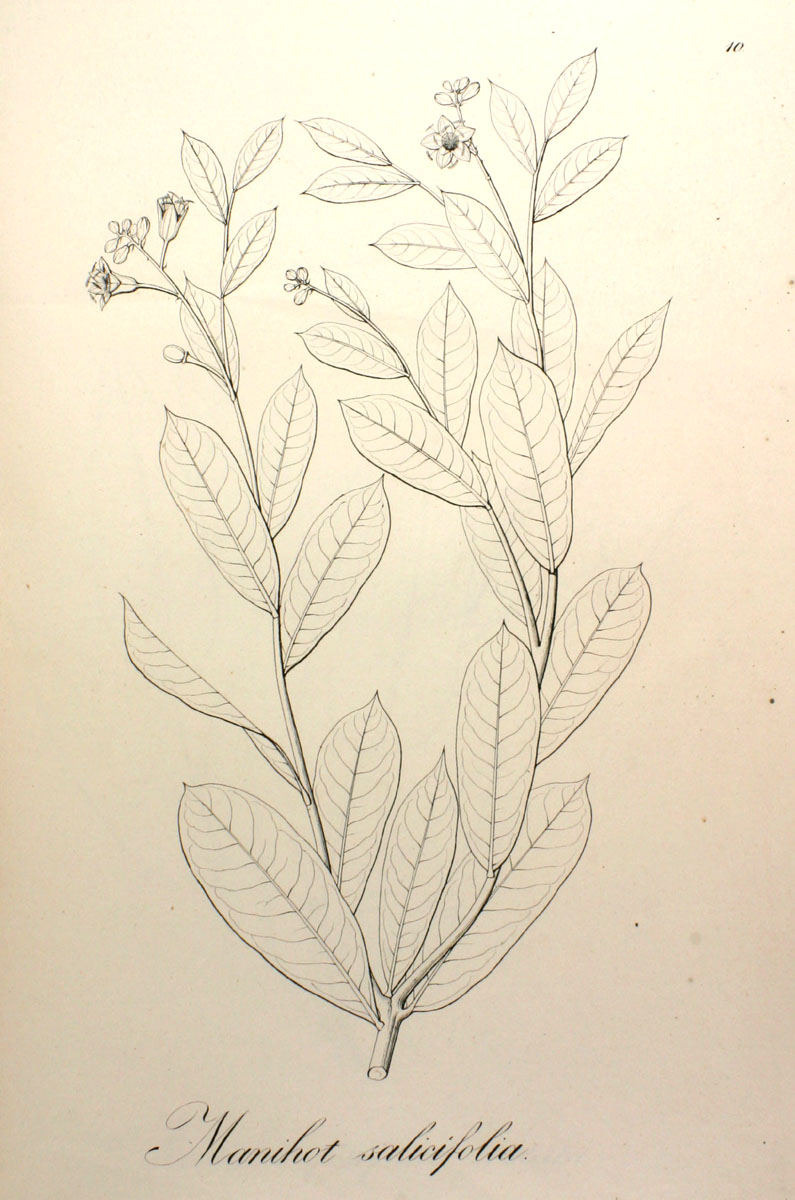
- Manihot salicifolia

Scientific classification
- Kingdom: Plantae
- Clade: Tracheophytes
- Clade: Angiosperms
- Clade: Eudicots
- Clade: Rosids
- Order: Malpighiales
- Family: Euphorbiaceae
- Subfamily: Crotonoideae
- Tribe: Manihoteae; Pax

Genera
- Cnidoscolus - bull nettle; Manihot

= Manihoteae =

Tribe of flowering plants

Manihoteae is a tribe of the subfamily Crotonoideae, under the family Euphorbiaceae. It comprises 2 genera.

== See also ==
- Taxonomy of the Euphorbiaceae
