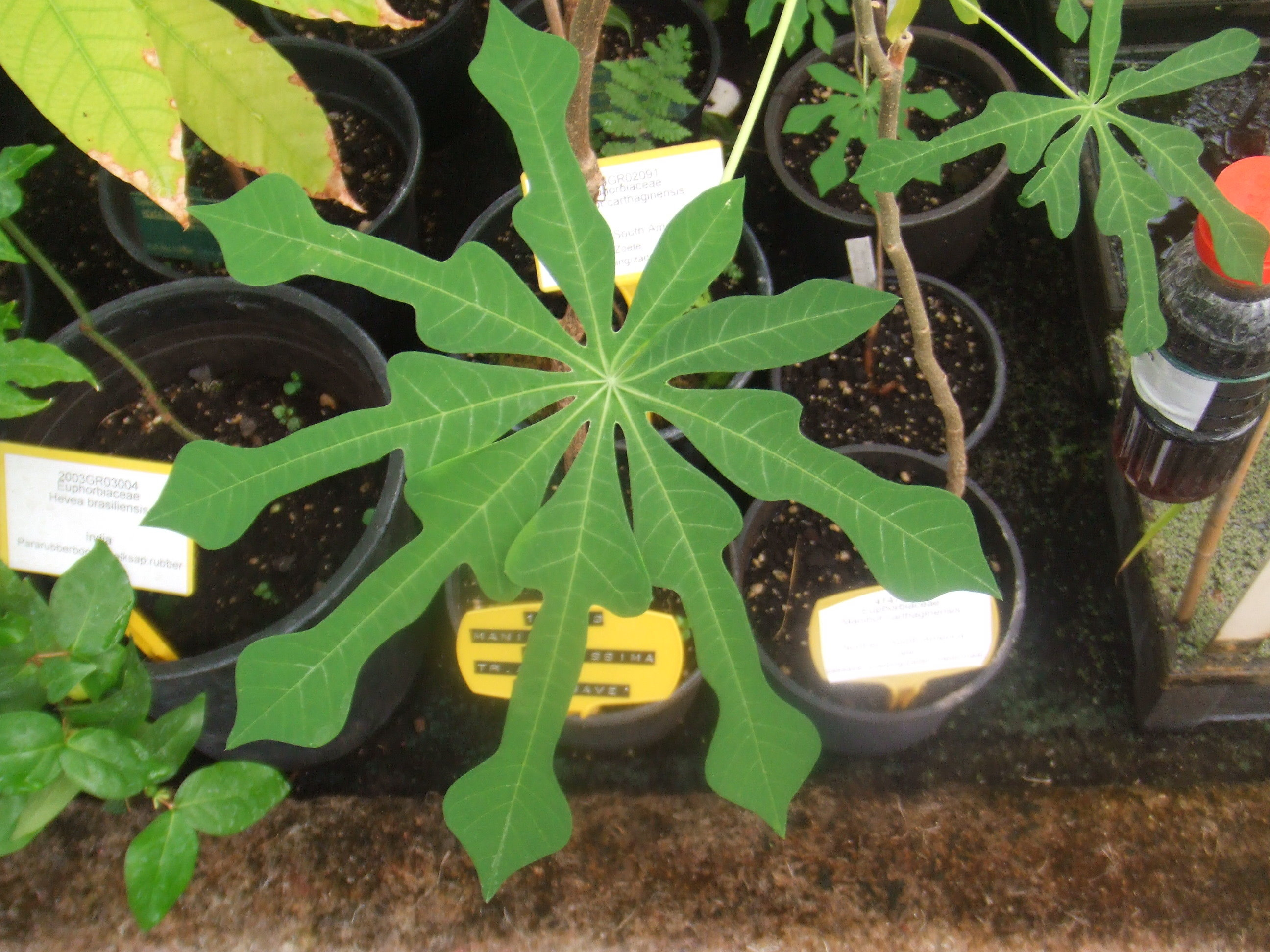
- Leaves of Manihot grahamii

Scientific classification
- Kingdom: Plantae
- Clade: Tracheophytes
- Clade: Angiosperms
- Clade: Eudicots
- Clade: Rosids
- Order: Malpighiales
- Family: Euphorbiaceae
- Genus: Manihot
- Species: M. grahamii

Binomial name
- Manihot grahamii Hook.

Synonyms
- Janipha loeflingii var. multifida Graham; Manihot dulcis var. multifida (Graham) Pax; Manihot enneaphylla Pax & K.Hoffm.; Manihot lobata (Chodat & Hassl.) Pax; Manihot loeflingii Müll.Arg.; Manihot loeflingii var. multifida (Graham) Müll.Arg.; Manihot palmata var. multifida (Graham) Müll.Arg.; Manihot tweedieana Müll.Arg.; Manihot tweedieana var. lobata Chodat & Hassl.; Manihot tweedieana f. nana Chodat & Hassl.

= Manihot grahamii =

Species of tree

Manihot grahamii is a shrub or treelet in the family Euphorbiaceae.

This fast-growing species is closely related to Manihot esculenta, the edible tapioca. Growing up to 3 metres (10 feet) tall, it bears striking palmate leaves, and pale green bell-shaped flowers in summer. It is native to South America, including southern Brazil, Uruguay, Paraguay and Argentina.

== Gallery ==
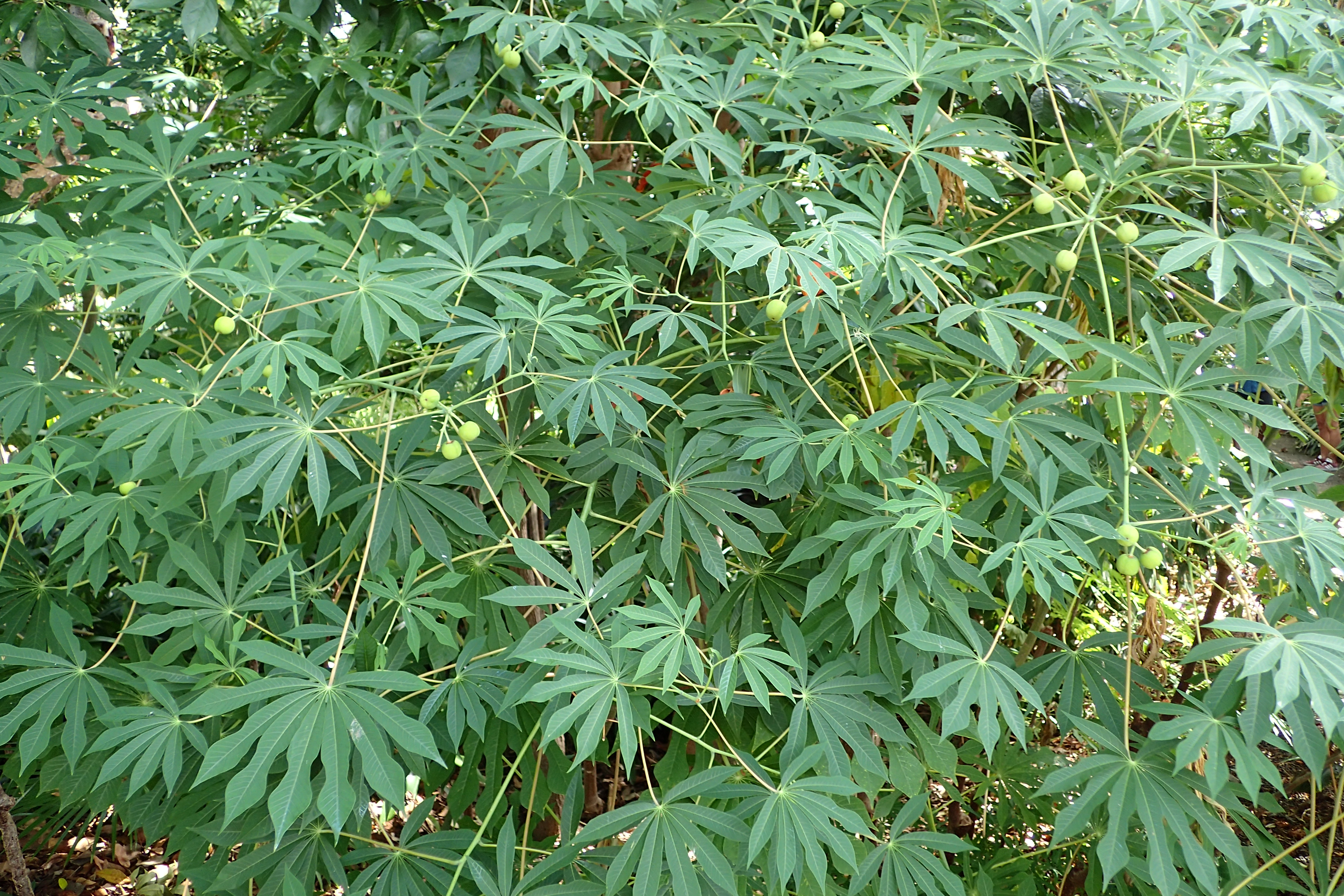
Tapioca shrubs

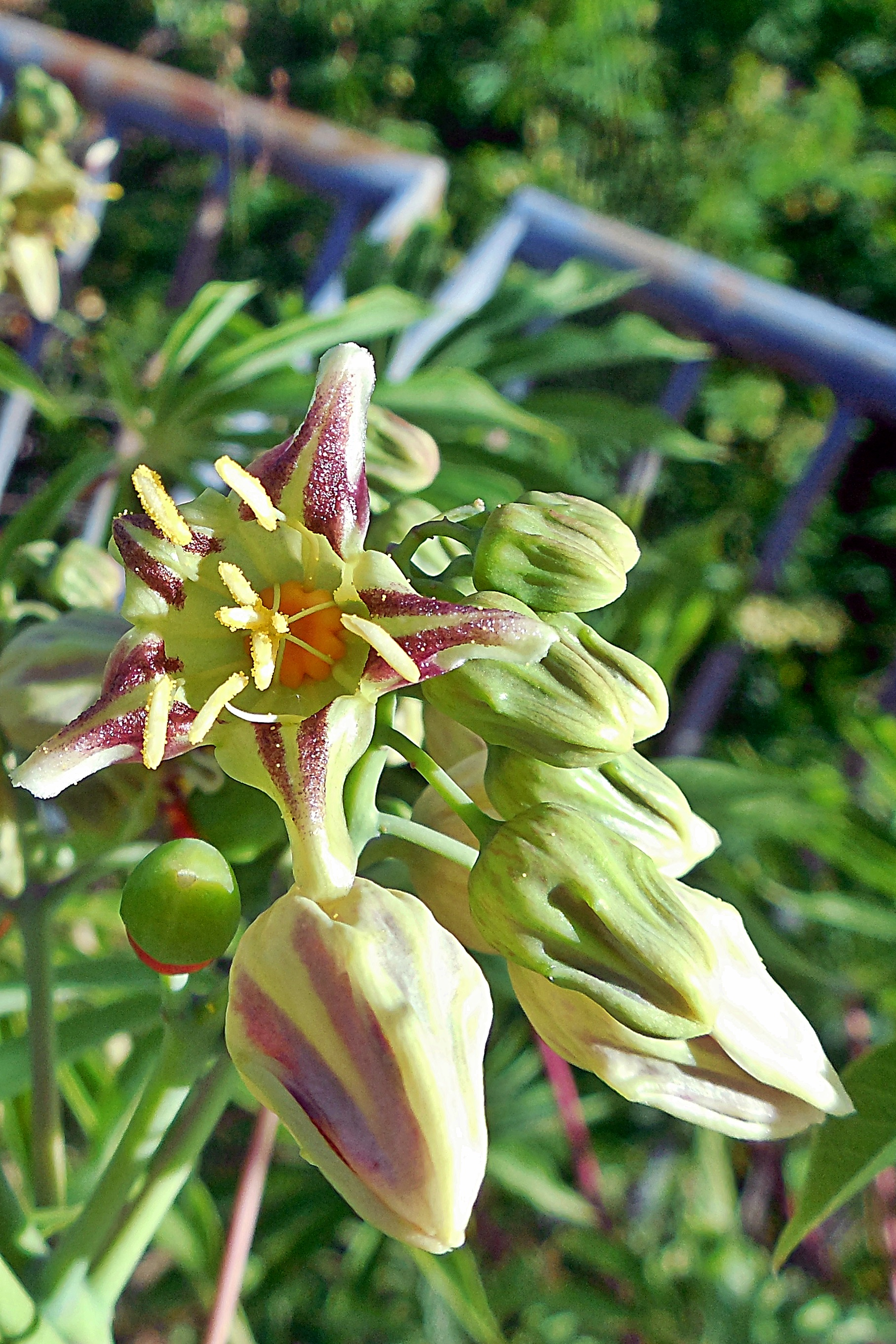
Inflorescence

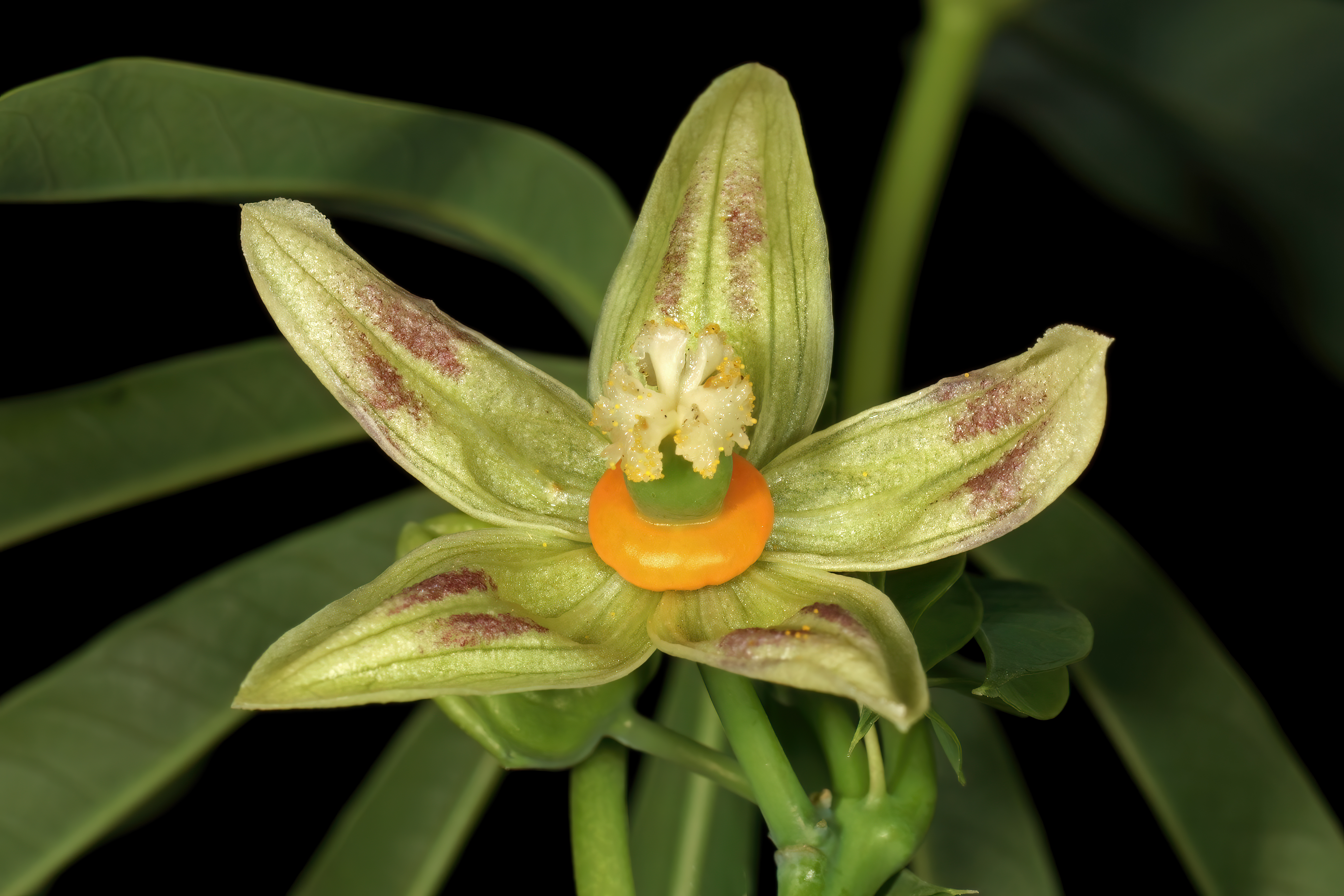
Flower

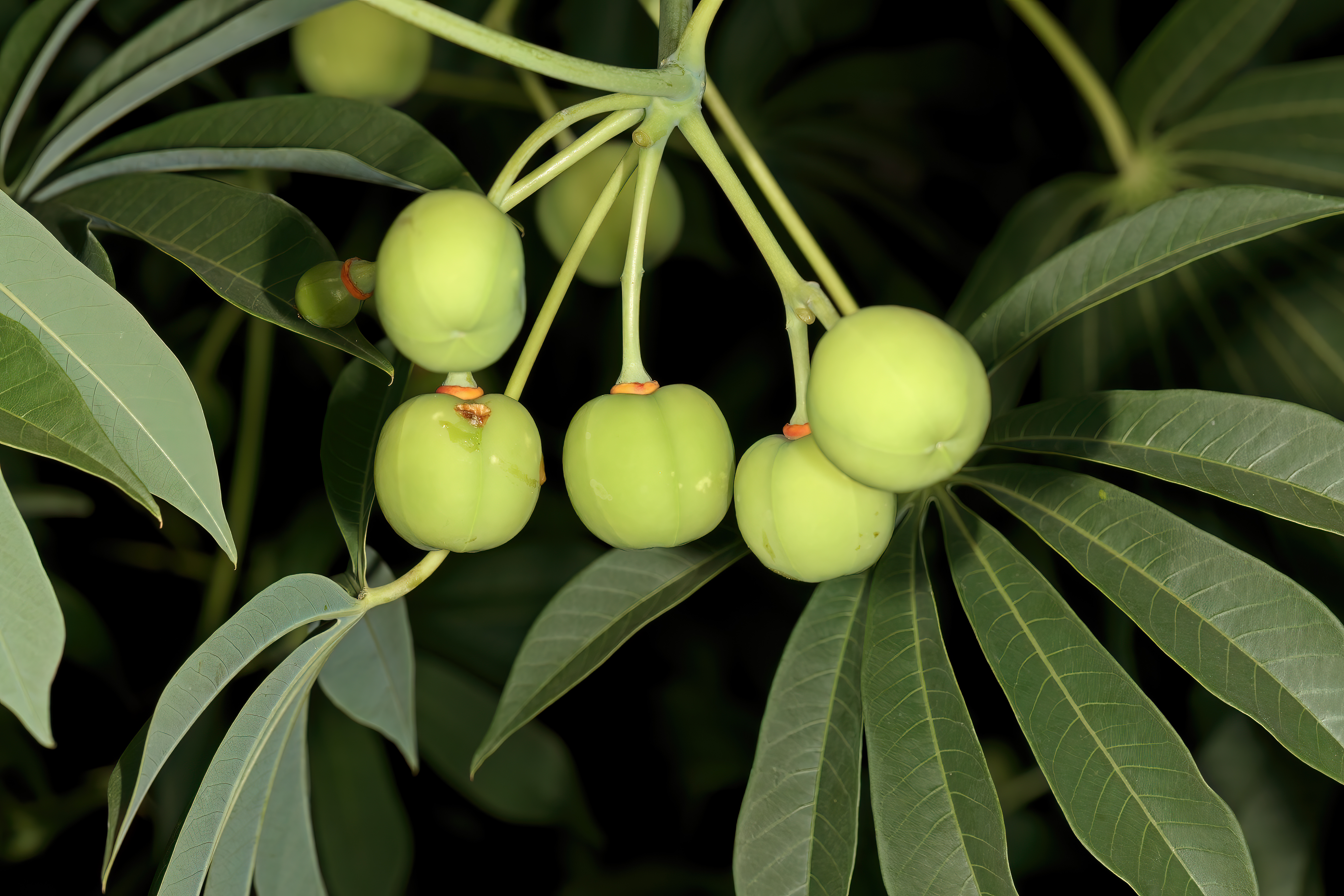
Fruits

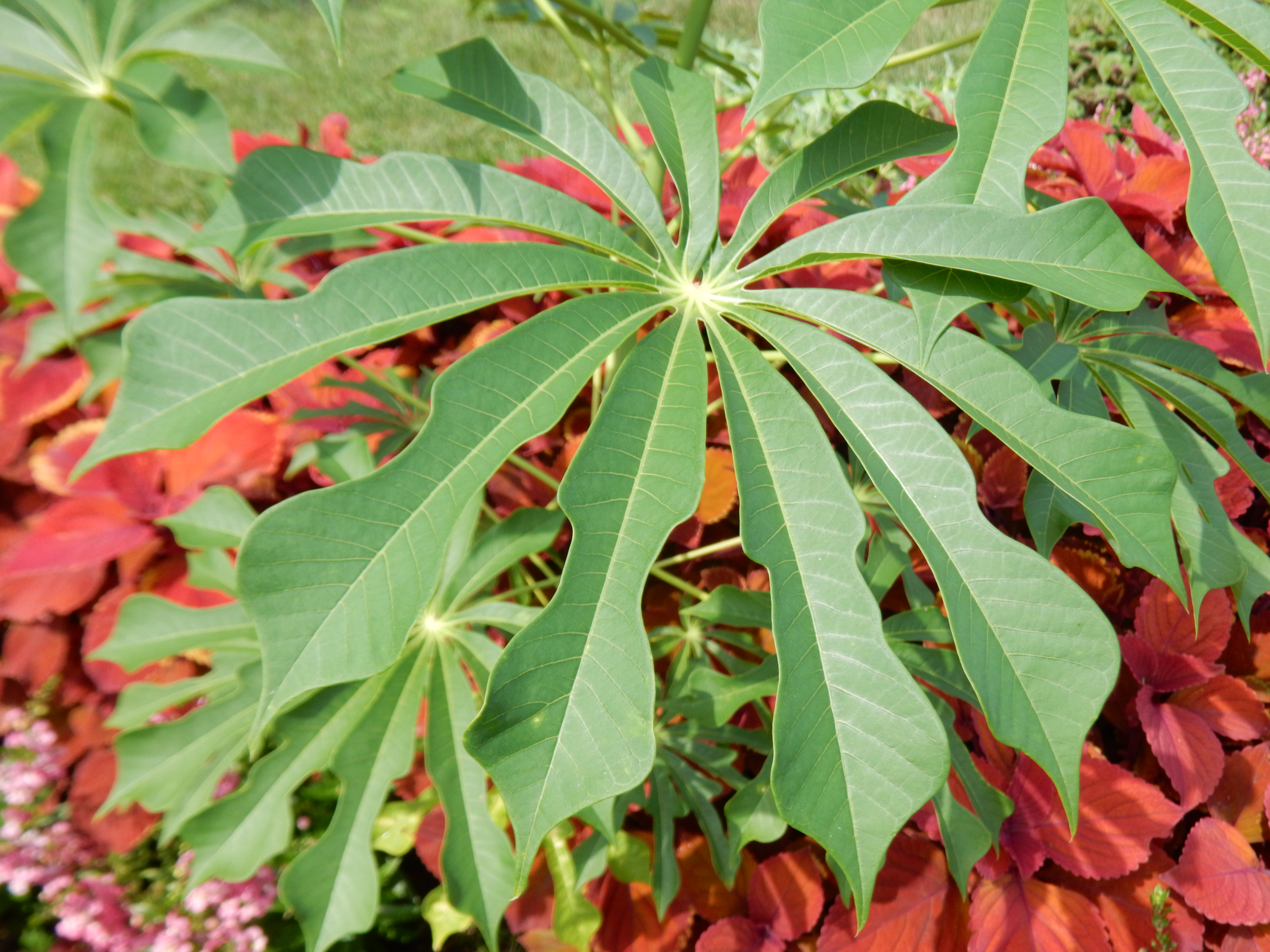
Foliage

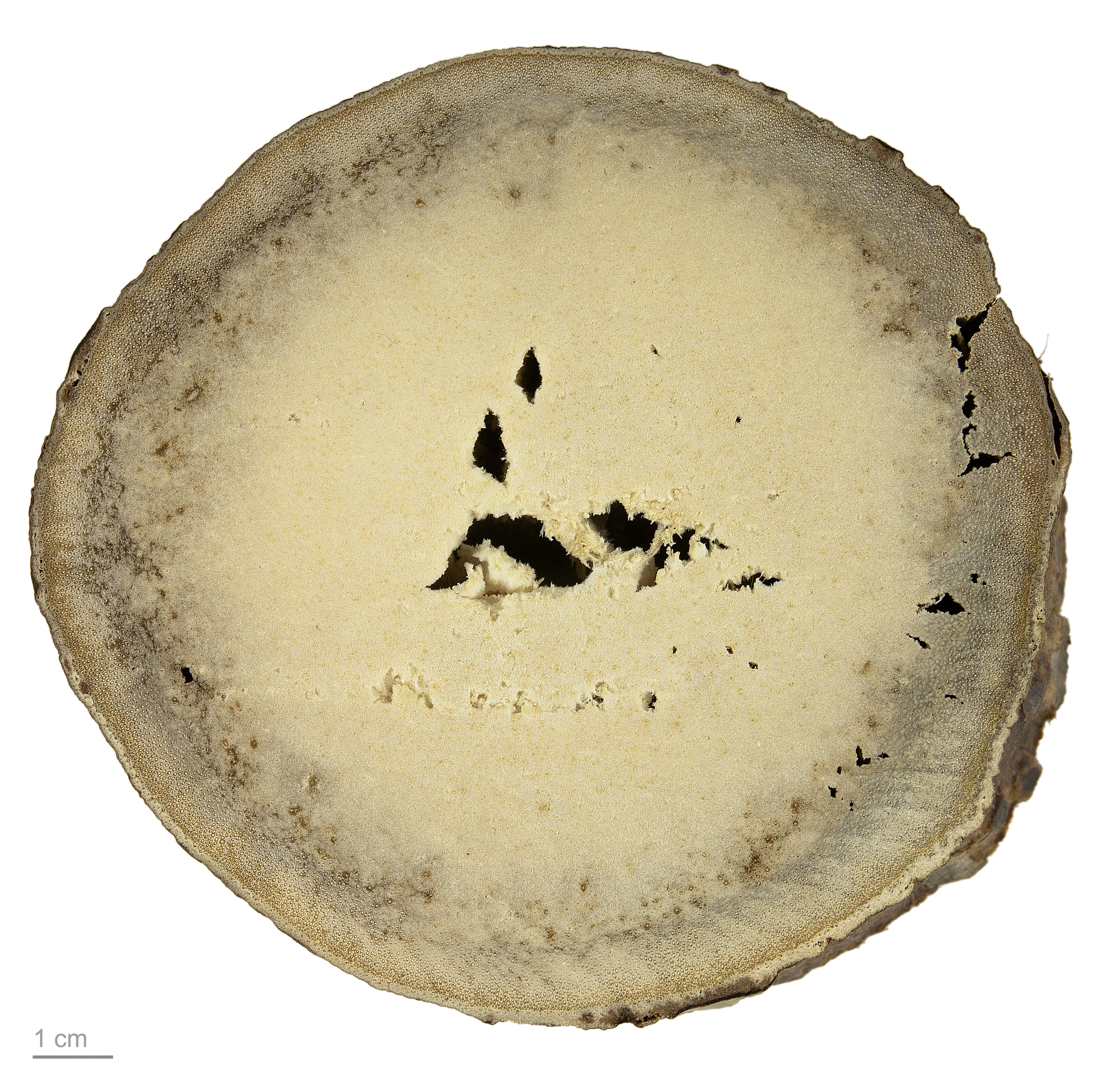
Wood - MHNT
