= Manihot pulchrifolius =

Scientific classification
- Kingdom: Plantae
- Clade: Tracheophytes
- Clade: Angiosperms
- Clade: Eudicots
- Clade: Rosids
- Order: Malpighiales
- Family: Euphorbiaceae
- Genus: Manihot
- Species: M. pulchrifolius

Binomial name
- Manihot pulchrifolius M.J.Silva

Species of shrub

Manihot pulchriforius is a flowering shrub that ranges from 1–2.5 metres (3 1/2–8 feet) tall and produces deep red or purple flowers, as well as dark green fruit with purple wings. It grows in the preserved mountains of Serra Dourada, in the state of Goiás, Brazil, and is commonly found growing on rocky outcrops 900–1,000 m (3,000–3,300 ft) in elevation.
