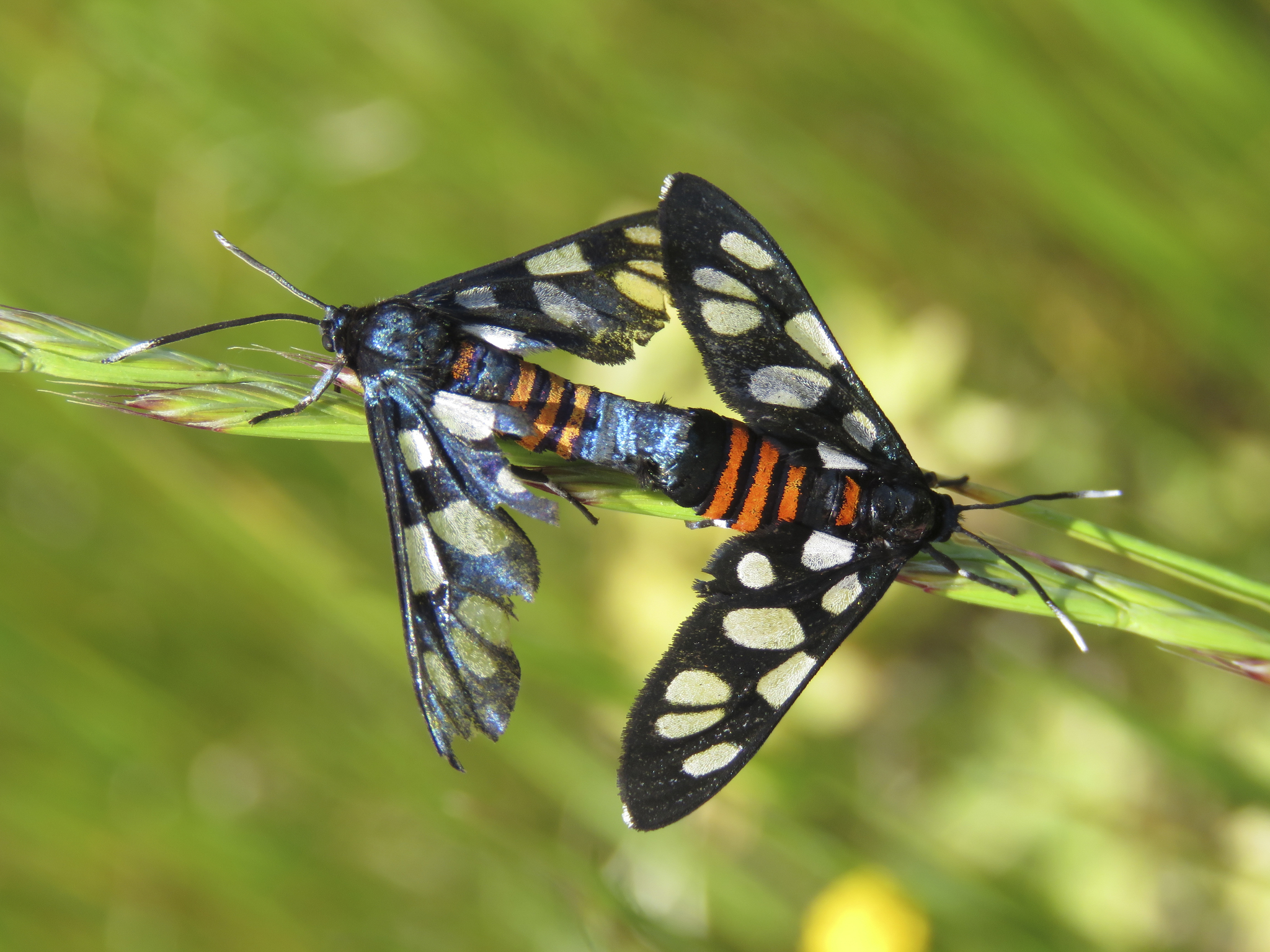

Scientific classification
- Kingdom: Animalia
- Phylum: Arthropoda
- Clade: Pancrustacea
- Class: Insecta
- Order: Lepidoptera
- Superfamily: Noctuoidea
- Family: Erebidae
- Subfamily: Arctiinae
- Genus: Amata
- Species: A. cerbera

Binomial name
- Amata cerbera (Linnaeus, 1764)

Synonyms
- Sphinx cerbera Linnaeus, 1764; Syntomis fantasia Butler, 1876; Syntomis cerbera hanningtoni Seitz, 1926

= Amata cerbera =

Heady maiden

Species of moth

Amata cerbera, the heady maiden, is a moth of the subfamily Arctiinae. It was described by Carl Linnaeus in 1764. It has an extensive range in sub-Saharan Africa.

== Range ==
It is found in Angola, the DRC, Gabon, Ghana, Guinea, Guinea-Bissau, Kenya, Malawi, Nigeria, Senegal, Sierra Leone, South Africa, Tanzania and Uganda.

== Food plants ==
The larvae feed on Rumex, Corylus, Plantago and Rubus species, but have also been recorded feeding on various grasses (including Festuca and Anthoxanthum) as well as Thapsia, Taraxacum, Urtica and Sonchus species, and even hay and paper.

== Description ==
Upperside: Antennae and head black. Thorax and abdomen shining blueish green; the latter having on the middle three rings of scarlet extending from side to side, but not meeting underneath. Anterior wings dark green, with six transparent spots like glass on them; the smallest, near the base, is round; three others, placed next the external margin, are oblong; the other two, which are in the middle, are oval and triangular. Posterior wings dark green, with two transparent spots; the largest next the shoulders; the other, which is round and small, beyond the middle.

Underside: Breast, abdomen, and legs shining mazarine blue, inclining to green; on the former is a small red spot, close to the shoulders of the superior wings. The hinder legs have one joint white. Wings of the same colour as on the upper side.

== Subspecies ==
- Amata cerbera cerbera
- Amata cerbera hanningtoni (Seitz, 1926) – DRC, Malawi, Tanzania
