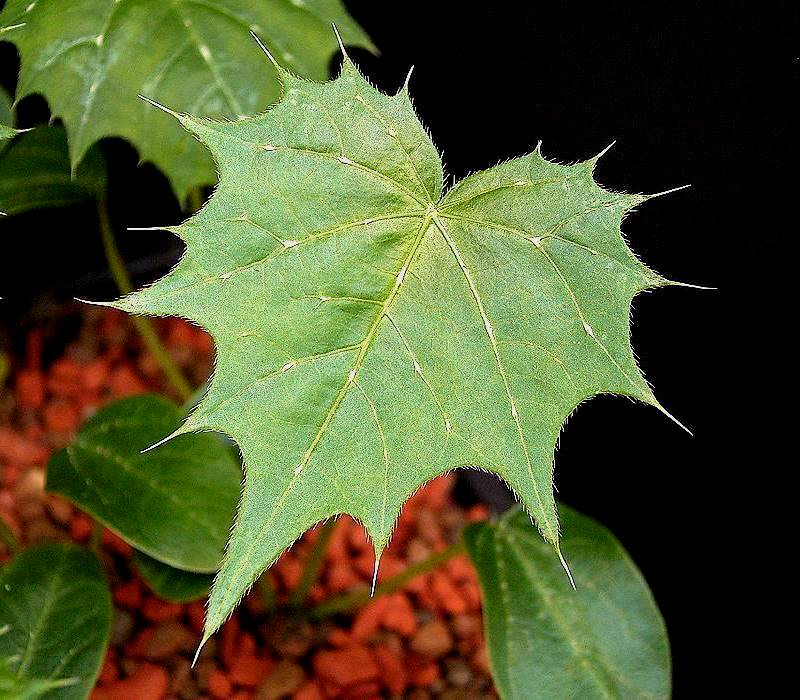

Scientific classification
- Kingdom: Plantae
- Clade: Tracheophytes
- Clade: Angiosperms
- Clade: Eudicots
- Clade: Rosids
- Order: Malpighiales
- Family: Euphorbiaceae
- Genus: Cnidoscolus
- Species: C. angustidens

Binomial name
- Cnidoscolus angustidens Torr.

Synonyms
- Jatropha angustidens (Torr.) Müll.Arg.; Cnidoscolus pringlei I.M.Johnst.; Jatropha pringlei (I.M.Johnst.) Standl.; Jatropha calyculata Pax & K.Hoffm.; Cnidoscolus calyculatus (Pax & K.Hoffm.) I.M.Johnst., Cnidoscolus orbiculatus Lundell

= Cnidoscolus angustidens =

Species of flowering plant

Cnidoscolus angustidens, with the common name mala mujer, is an herbaceous perennial plant in the spurge family (Euphorbiaceae).

It is native to the Sonoran Desert mountains of southeastern Arizona and Northwestern Mexico, and further south in Mexico.

"Mala mujer" is Spanish for "bad woman", referring to its stinging hairs which cause severe contact dermatitis.

Subspecies

1. Cnidoscolus angustidens subsp. angustidens - Arizona, Mexico
2. Cnidoscolus angustidens subsp. calyculatus (Pax & K.Hoffm.) Breckon ex Fern.Casas - Michoacán
3. Cnidoscolus angustidens subsp. dentatus Breckon ex Fern.Casas - Jalisco, Guerrero, Puebla
4. Cnidoscolus angustidens subsp. orbiculatus (Lundell) Breckon ex Fern.Casas - C + S Mexico
