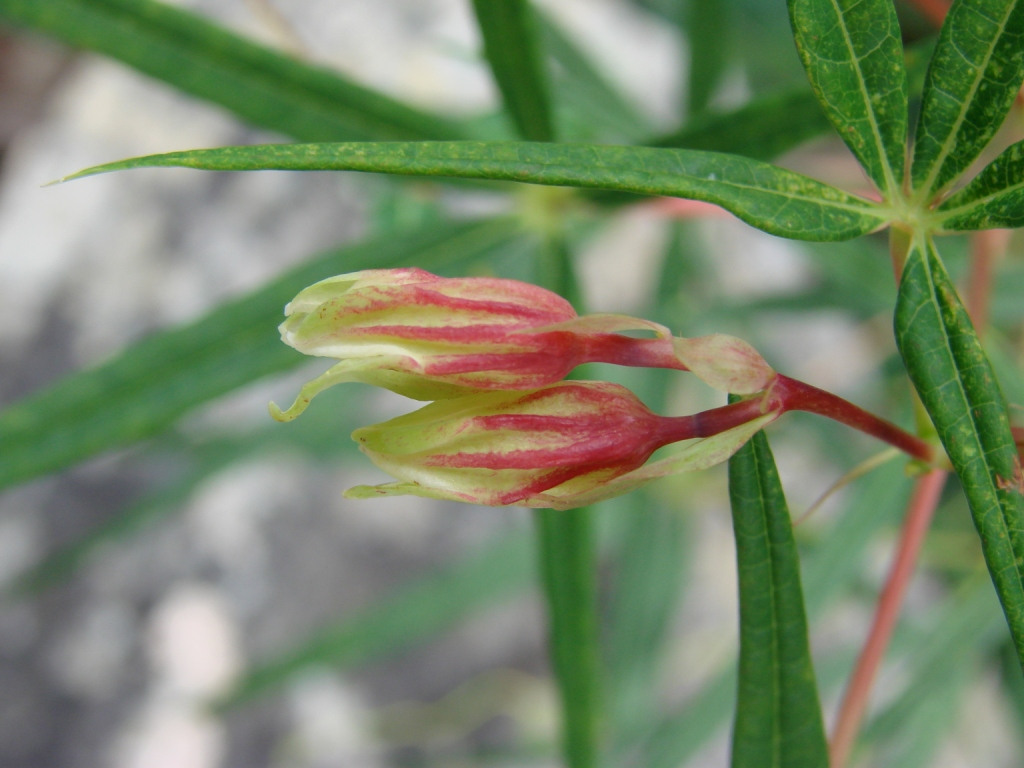
- A M. pentaphylla specimen in Goiás, Brazil

Scientific classification
- Kingdom: Plantae
- Clade: Tracheophytes
- Clade: Angiosperms
- Clade: Eudicots
- Clade: Rosids
- Order: Malpighiales
- Family: Euphorbiaceae
- Genus: Manihot
- Species: M. pentaphylla

Binomial name
- Manihot pentaphylla H.S. Irwin et al.

Synonyms
- Jatropha pentaphylla (Pohl) Steud.; Manihot uleana Pax & K.Hoffm.

= Manihot pentaphylla =

Species of flowering plant

Manihot pentaphylla is a crotonoid species in the spurge family. It has the synonyms Jatropha pentaphylla and Manihot uleana. M. pentaphylla was first described by H. S. Irwin et al. based on a specimen found in Goiás, Brazil. Two subspecies are known, M. pentaphylla pentaphylla and M. pentaphylla graminifolia, both of which are on the IUCN Red List.
