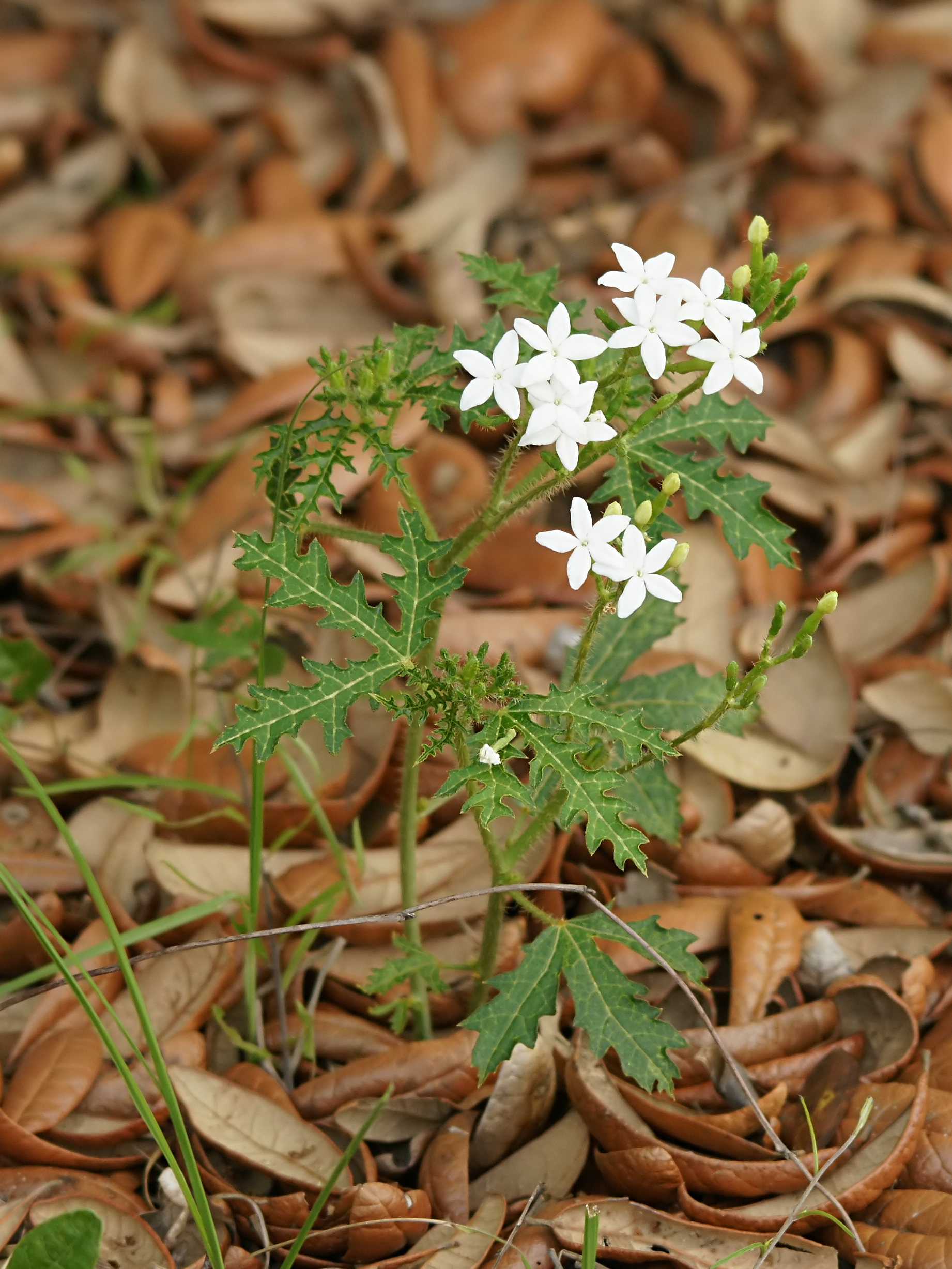

Scientific classification
- Kingdom: Plantae
- Clade: Tracheophytes
- Clade: Angiosperms
- Clade: Eudicots
- Clade: Rosids
- Order: Malpighiales
- Family: Euphorbiaceae
- Genus: Cnidoscolus
- Species: C. stimulosus

Binomial name
- Cnidoscolus stimulosus (Michx.) Engelm. & Gray

Synonyms
- Cnidoscolus urens var. stimulosus (Michx.) Govaerts; Jatropha stimulosa Michx.

= Cnidoscolus stimulosus =

Species of flowering plant

Cnidoscolus stimulosus, the bull nettle, spurge nettle, stinging nettle, tread-softly or finger rot, is a perennial herb covered with stinging hairs, native to southeastern North America. A member of the family Euphorbiaceae (spurge family), it is not a true nettle. It prefers sandy, well-drained soil and mostly exists in pine/blackjack oak forests on sandhills, rims of Carolina bays, dunes, dry pastures, fields and roadsides.

== Description ==
Cnidoscolus stimulosus is an herbaceous, erect or reclining plant that grows 5–100 cm (2–40 in) tall.

The green leaves of this plant are alternate, consisting of three to five dentate lobes. The large, white flowers have five petals. Male and female flowers are on different plants (monoecious). Flowers occur throughout the spring and summer followed by a small capsule that produces three large seeds. The entire plant above ground, including the flower petals, is covered with stinging hairs. The tap root can be used as an excellent potato substitute, tasting like pasta.

As the common names imply, the urticating hairs on this plant contain a caustic irritant that inflicts a painful sting to those who contact it with bare skin. It can cause a painful, irritating rash and can cause more serious reactions in some people.

== Distribution and habitat ==
C. stimulosus is native to the southeastern United States Coastal Plains. It ranges from Louisiana and Florida north to Virginia and Kentucky, excluding Tennessee and Arkansas.

This species is found on deep, well drained, sandy soil in sparsely-canopied uplands. It also grows in disturbed areas, such as old fields, roadsides, railways, bulldozed clearings, and residential lawns.

== Etymology and names ==
The species name stimulosus comes from the Latin stimulus, meaning "goad" or "prod". This plant is also known as bull nettle and mala mujer (Spanish for "bad woman" or witch), though the latter name is applied to several other plants with similar properties.

== Ecology ==
Seeds from C. stimulosus are dispersed ballistically, with the seed being forcefully expelled after the fruit matures and dries. The seeds have elaiosomes and are collected by ants, which aid in their dispersal.
