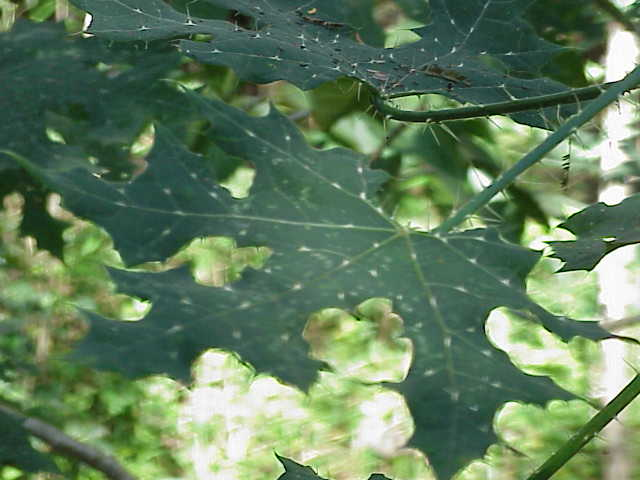
- Cnidoscolus souzae

Scientific classification
- Kingdom: Plantae
- Clade: Tracheophytes
- Clade: Angiosperms
- Clade: Eudicots
- Clade: Rosids
- Order: Malpighiales
- Family: Euphorbiaceae
- Subfamily: Crotonoideae
- Tribe: Manihoteae
- Genus: Cnidoscolus; Pohl

Synonyms
- Bivonea Raf.; Jussieuia Houst.; Victorinia Léon

= Cnidoscolus =

Genus of flowering plants

Cnidoscolus is a genus of plants in the family Euphorbiaceae that was erected in 1827. The group is widespread across much of North and South America, including the West Indies.

The name is derived from the Greek words κνίδη (knide), meaning "nettle," and σκόλοψ (skolops), meaning "thorn" or "prickle."

Species

1. Cnidoscolus aconitifolius - Mexico, Central America
2. Cnidoscolus acrandrus - Dominican Rep
3. Cnidoscolus aculeatissimus - Goiás, Minas Gerais, Rio de Janeiro
4. Cnidoscolus adenoblepharus - Bahia
5. Cnidoscolus adenochlamys - N Brazil, the Guianas
6. Cnidoscolus aequatoriensis - Ecuador
7. Cnidoscolus albibracteatus - Guerrero
8. Cnidoscolus albidus - NE Mexico
9. Cnidoscolus albomaculatus - Paraguay, S Brazil, NE Argentina
10. Cnidoscolus angustidens - Mexico, Arizona
11. Cnidoscolus appendiculatus - Paraguay, Misiones
12. Cnidoscolus aurelii - Tocantins
13. Cnidoscolus autlanensis - Jalisco
14. Cnidoscolus bahianus - Brazil
15. Cnidoscolus basiacanthus - Peru
16. Cnidoscolus beckii - Bolivia
17. Cnidoscolus bellator - W Cuba
18. Cnidoscolus byssinus - Bahia
19. Cnidoscolus cajamarcensis - Peru
20. Cnidoscolus calcareus - Mato Grosso do Sul
21. Cnidoscolus calyptratus - Goiás
22. Cnidoscolus calyptrodontus - Bahia
23. Cnidoscolus ceballosii - Bahia
24. Cnidoscolus cervii - Mato Grosso do Sul
25. Cnidoscolus conicus - Minas Gerais
26. Cnidoscolus diacanthus - Peru
27. Cnidoscolus egregius - Puebla, Oaxaca
28. Cnidoscolus elasticus - N + C Mexico
29. Cnidoscolus fimbriatus - Venezuela
30. Cnidoscolus froesii - Brazil
31. Cnidoscolus graminifolius - Tocantins
32. Cnidoscolus guatimalensis - Guatemala
33. Cnidoscolus halteris - Pernambuco, Bahia
34. Cnidoscolus hamosus - E Brazil
35. Cnidoscolus hypokerinus - Bahia
36. Cnidoscolus hypoleucus - Peru
37. Cnidoscolus inaequalis - Goiás, Mato Grosso do Sul
38. Cnidoscolus infestus - E Brazil
39. Cnidoscolus jaenensis - Peru
40. Cnidoscolus kunthianus - Colombia, Venezuela, Guyana
41. Cnidoscolus leuconeurus - Paraguay
42. Cnidoscolus liebmannii - Puebla
43. Cnidoscolus liesneri - Cajamarca
44. Cnidoscolus loasoides - Paraguay, NE Argentina
45. Cnidoscolus lombardii - Minas Gerais
46. Cnidoscolus longibracteatus - Guatemala
47. Cnidoscolus longipes - Colombia
48. Cnidoscolus maculatus - Baja California Sur, Sonora, Colima
49. Cnidoscolus magni-gerdtii - Bahia
50. Cnidoscolus maracayensis - Canindeyú
51. Cnidoscolus matosii - E Cuba
52. Cnidoscolus megacanthus - Oaxaca, Central America
53. Cnidoscolus minarum - Bahia, Minas Gerais
54. Cnidoscolus mitis - Mato Grosso
55. Cnidoscolus monicanus - Michoacán
56. Cnidoscolus monsanto - Bahia
57. Cnidoscolus multilobus - Mexico, Central America
58. Cnidoscolus oligandrus - SE Brazil
59. Cnidoscolus orientensis - Bolivia
60. Cnidoscolus palmeri - Baja California Sur, Sonora
61. Cnidoscolus paucistamineus - Mato Grosso, Mato Grosso do Sul
62. Cnidoscolus pavonianus - Peru
63. Cnidoscolus piranii - Bahia
64. Cnidoscolus populifolius - Bahia
65. Cnidoscolus pteroneurus - Paraguay
66. Cnidoscolus pubescens - Brazil
67. Cnidoscolus pyrophorus - Peru
68. Cnidoscolus quercifolius - E Brazil
69. Cnidoscolus rangel - Pinar del Río
70. Cnidoscolus regina - Sierra Sagua Baracoa in Cuba
71. Cnidoscolus rostratus - C + SW Mexico
72. Cnidoscolus rotundifolius - NE Mexico
73. Cnidoscolus rupestris - Bahia
74. Cnidoscolus rzedowskii - Querétaro, Guanajuato
75. Cnidoscolus sellowianus - Brazil
76. Cnidoscolus serrulatus - Paraguay
77. Cnidoscolus shrevei - Durango, Coahuila
78. Cnidoscolus sinaloensis - Sinaloa, Nayarit
79. Cnidoscolus souzae - S Mexico, Belize, Guatemala
80. Cnidoscolus spathulatus - Goiás, São Paulo
81. Cnidoscolus spinosus - SW Mexico
82. Cnidoscolus stimulosus - SE USA
83. Cnidoscolus subinteger - Paraguay, Mato Grosso do Sul
84. Cnidoscolus tehuacanensis - Puebla, Oaxaca
85. Cnidoscolus tepiquensis - Sinaloa, Jalisco, Nayarit
86. Cnidoscolus texanus - SC USA
87. Cnidoscolus tridentifer - Mato Grosso do Sul
88. Cnidoscolus tubulosus - from Mexico to Argentina
89. Cnidoscolus ulei - Bahia
90. Cnidoscolus urens - Mexico, Central + South America, West Indies, SE USA
91. Cnidoscolus urentissimus - Espírito Santo, Minas Gerais
92. Cnidoscolus urnigerus - E Brazil
93. Cnidoscolus vitifolius - Brazil, Bolivia, NW Argentina

formerly included

moved to Astraea Jatropha

- C. obtusifolius - Jatropha mutabilis
- C. surinamensis - Astraea lobata
