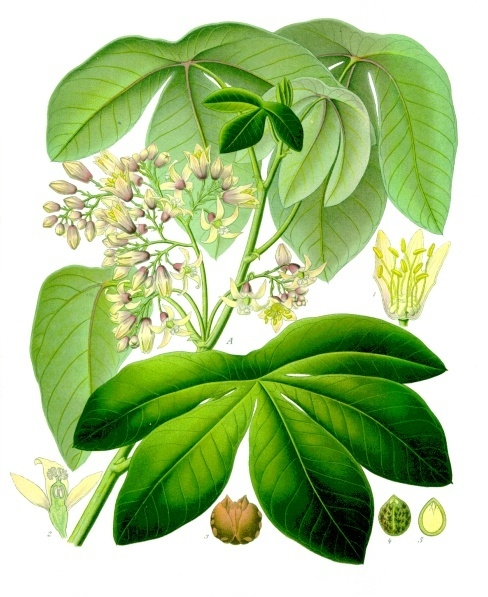

Scientific classification
- Kingdom: Plantae
- Clade: Embryophytes
- Clade: Tracheophytes
- Clade: Angiosperms
- Clade: Eudicots
- Clade: Rosids
- Order: Malpighiales
- Family: Euphorbiaceae
- Genus: Manihot
- Species: M. carthaginensis
- Subspecies: M. c. subsp. glaziovii

Trinomial name
- Manihot carthaginensis subsp. glaziovii Allem

Synonyms
- Manihot glaziovii Müll.Arg.

= Manihot carthaginensis subsp. glaziovii =

Tree cassava

Subspecies of flowering plant

Manihot carthaginensis subsp. glaziovii, also known as Manihot glaziovii, the tree cassava or Ceara rubber tree, is a species of deciduous flowering plant in the spurge family, Euphorbiaceae, that is native to eastern Brazil.

== Description ==
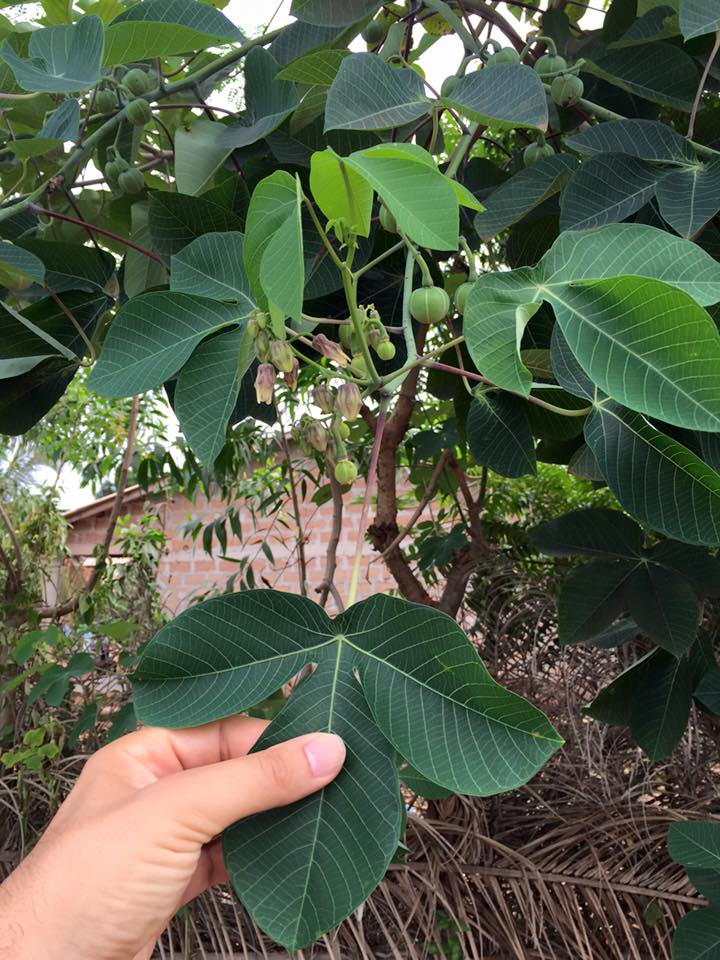
Cotonou, Benin

- Leaves - palmipartite, peltate; lobes broadly ovate to obovate; green above, glaucous beneath.
- Flowers - show branched inflorescence. Unisexual flowers are greenish-white or pale yellow with reddish markings.
- Fruit - globose.

== Common names ==
- French - manioc de ceara, maniçoba, ceara, caouchouc de ceara
- Portuguese - maniçoba
- Swahili - mpira
- Yoruba - gbaguda

== Uses ==
The tree cassava was used a source of rubber, instead of Hevea brasiliensis throughout the world. The plant is introduced largely in the world, but now it is classified as one of the highly invasive plant of the world.

This species is useful in cassava breeding because it is a wild relative. Several quantitative trait loci (QTLs) are known to be usable or in use for introgression into cultivated cassava. This includes those for cassava brown streak disease resistance found by Abaca et al., 2013 and four found by Nzuki et al., 2017.

== Invasiveness ==
The species is invasive in New Caledonia.
