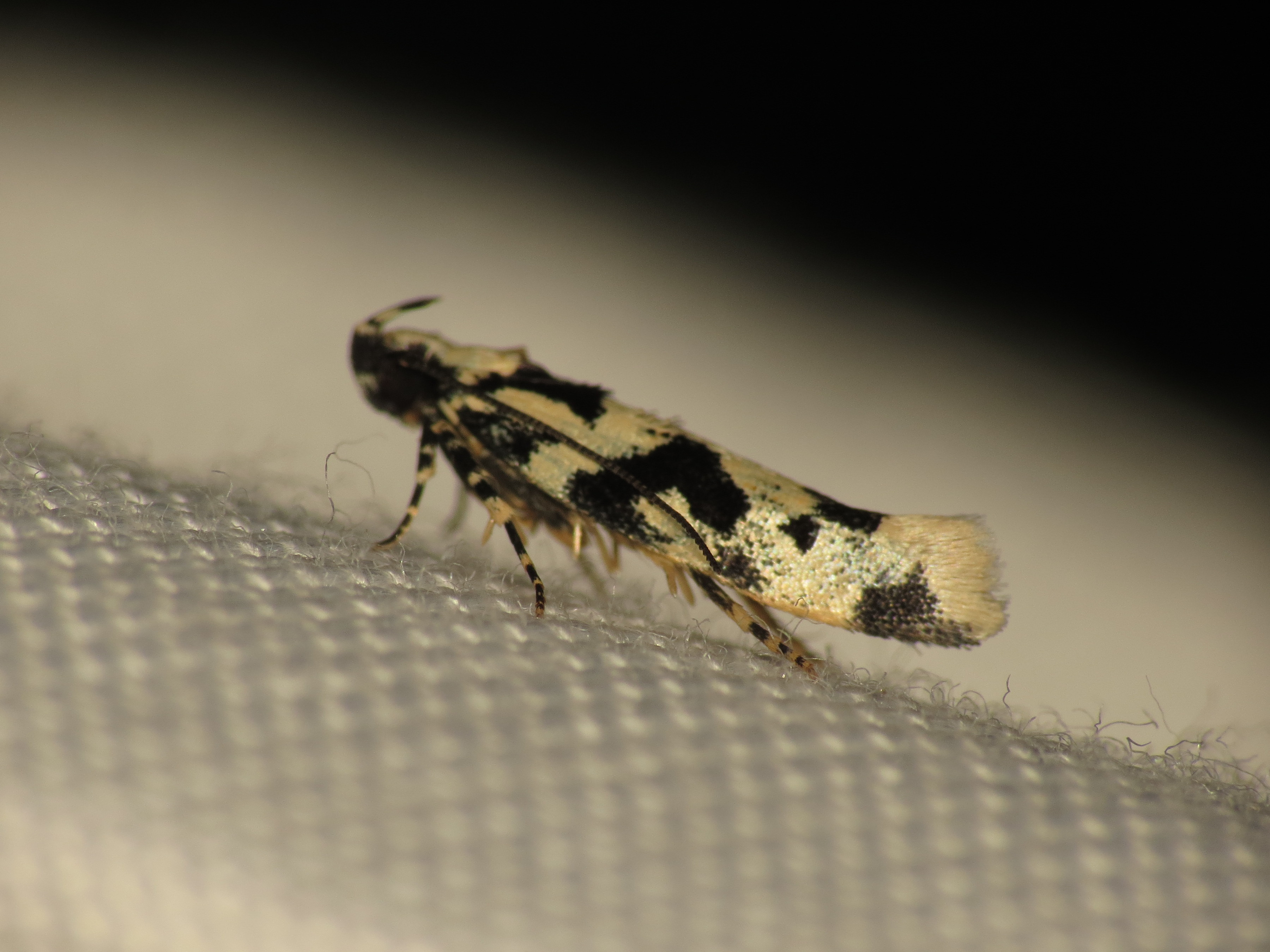

Scientific classification
- Domain: Eukaryota
- Kingdom: Animalia
- Phylum: Arthropoda
- Class: Insecta
- Order: Lepidoptera
- Family: Cosmopterigidae
- Genus: Hyposmocoma
- Species: H. alliterata

Binomial name
- Hyposmocoma alliterata Walsingham, 1907

= Hyposmocoma alliterata =

Species of moth

Hyposmocoma alliterata is a species of moth of the family Cosmopterigidae. It was first described by Lord Walsingham in 1907. It is endemic to the Hawaiian islands of Oahu, Molokai, Maui and Hawaii. This species is thought to range from the lowlands to the highlands, where it is most abundant.

The larvae feed amongst lichens on trees trunks of Acacia koa, Aleurites moluccanus, Boehmeria, Manihot glaziovii, Prosopis and Sophora. Its larvae are at times common on the trunks of living trees.

Larvae in a broad, flat, rounded-oval case coming to a point in front. The case really is not so broad, but has a broad extension on sides and rear made of a single layer of round bits of epidermis from the bark, forming a mosaic of the coloration of the bark of the tree on which it lives, and thus not seen by the casual observer

— Otto Herman Swezey, 1910:140
