= List of Little Picacho Wilderness flora =

Coordinates: 32°56′21″N 114°34′08″W

The flora of the Little Picacho Wilderness located in southeastern Imperial County, Southern California. It is within the Colorado Desert subregion, of the Sonoran Desert ecoregion

The Little Picacho Wilderness is located in the southern portion of the Lower Colorado River Valley, with its eastern side along the Colorado River (Little Picacho Wash runs ~ 1.5 miles (2 km) downstream); and is 10 miles (16 km) north of Yuma, Arizona and Winterhaven, California. The wilderness area protects a region of the southeastern Chocolate Mountains.

== Complete list of flora: Genus-species-(binomials) ==
- Acacia greggii
- Amsinckia menziesii var. intermedia
- Asclepias subulata
- Bebbia juncea
- Cercidium floridum
- Chaenactis fremontii
- Chorizanthe rigida
- Cryptantha angustifolia
- Dalea albiflora
- Encelia farinosa
- "ReDir" Eriogonum ssp.
  - Desert trumpet
- "ReDir" Euphorbia albomarginata
- Fagonia laevis
- Ferocactus wislizeni
- "ReDir" Fouquieria splendens (Ocotillo)
- Geraea canescens
- Hibiscus denudatus
- Hyptis emoryi
- Krameria grayi
- Larrea tridentata
- Lupinus arizonicus
- Nicotiana obtusifolia
- Olneya tesota
- Opuntia acanthocarpa
  - (syn: Cylindropuntia acanthocarpa
- Opuntia basilaris
- Parkinsonia florida — (Blue Paloverde)
- Peucephyllum schottii
- Phacelia spp. — (Scorpionweed)
  - Phacelia crenulata subsp.
- Prosopis ssp. — (Mesquite)
- Psyllium ssp.
- Psorothamnus spinosus
- Sphaeralcea ambigua

== Perennials ==
=== Perennials: Common name ===
- Beavertail Cactus
- Bebbia—Chuckwalla's Delight
- Brittlebush
- Buckhorn Cholla
- Catclaw Acacia
- Creosote bush
- Desert fir
- Desert Globemallow
- Desert Ironwood
- Desert Lavender
- Fishhook Barrel Cactus
- Mesquite — (Prosopis ssp.)
- Rush Milkweed
  - Desert Milkweed, Leafless Milkweed
- Ocotillo
- Blue Palo Verde
- Rock Hibiscus
- Smoketree (Psorothamnus)
  - Smokethorn'
- White Ratany

=== Perennials: Genus-species-(binomials) ===
- Acacia greggii
- Asclepias subulata
- Bebbia juncea
- Cercidium floridum
- Encelia farinosa
- Ferocactus wislizeni
- "ReDir" Fouquieria splendens
- Hibiscus denudatus
- Hyptis emoryi
- Krameria grayi
- Larrea tridentata
- Olneya tesota
- Opuntia acanthocarpa
  - (syn: Cylindropuntia acanthocarpa
- Opuntia basilaris
- Peucephyllum schottii
- Prosopis ssp. — (Mesquite)
- Psorothamnus spinosus
- Sphaeralcea ambigua

==== Trees, perennials: Common name ====
- Catclaw Acacia
- Desert Ironwood
- Blue Palo Verde
- Smoketree (Psorothamnus)
  - Smokethorn

==== Trees, perennials: Genus-species-(binomials) ====
- Acacia greggii
- Cercidium floridum
- Olneya tesota
- Parkinsonia florida
- Psorothamnus spinosus

== Annuals ==
=== Common name ===
- Arizona Lupine
- California Fagonbush
- 'Chicura
- Common Fiddleneck
- Desert Sunflower
- Desert Tobacco
- Desert trumpet
- Fremont's pincushion
- Narrow-leaved Popcorn Flower
- Plantago — (Psyllium ssp.)
- Rattlesnake Weed
- Rigid Spiny Herb
- Scorpionweed — (Phacelia spp.)
  - Notch-leaved Phacelia
- Scruffy Prairie Clover
- White-bract Stick Leaf
  - White-bract Blazing Star

=== Genus-species ===
- Amsinckia menziesii var. intermedia
- Chaenactis fremontii
- Chorizanthe rigida
- Cryptantha angustifolia
- Dalea albiflora
- "ReDir" Eriogonum ssp.
  - Eriogonum inflatum — (Desert trumpet)
- "ReDir" Euphorbia albomarginata
- Fagonia laevis
- Geraea canescens
- Lupinus arizonicus
- Mentzelia involucrata
- Nicotiana obtusifolia
- Phacelia spp. — (Scorpionweed)
  - Phacelia crenulata subsp.
- Psyllium ssp.

== See also ==
- List of southern LCRV flora by region
