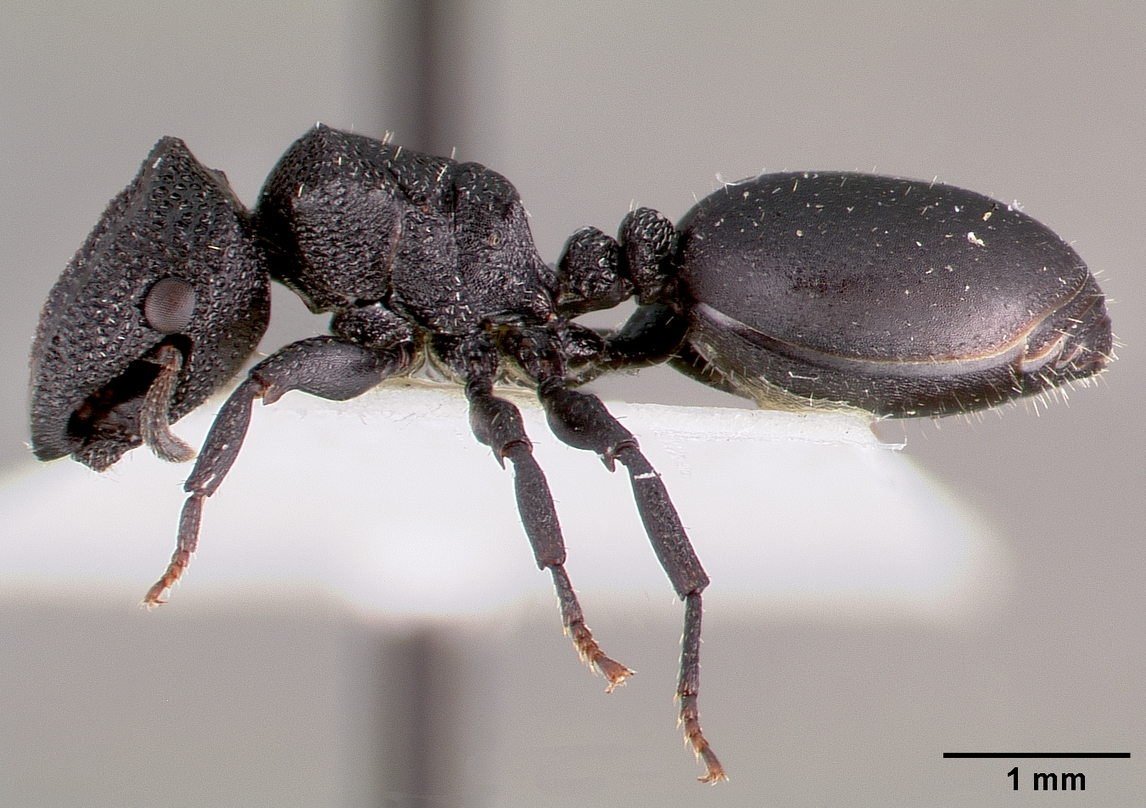
- Cephalotes rohweri worker

Scientific classification
- Kingdom: Animalia
- Phylum: Arthropoda
- Clade: Pancrustacea
- Class: Insecta
- Order: Hymenoptera
- Family: Formicidae
- Subfamily: Myrmicinae
- Genus: Cephalotes
- Species: C. rohweri

Binomial name
- Cephalotes rohweri (Wheeler, 1916)

= Cephalotes rohweri =

Species of ant

Cephalotes rohweri is a species of arboreal ant of the genus Cephalotes, characterized by an odd shaped head, and the ability to "parachute" by steering their fall if they drop off of the tree they're on. Giving their name also as gliding ants.

== Characteristics ==
Cephalotes rohweri is most commonly found in the Sonoran Desert, where it establishes nests in abandoned beetle cavities in Palo Verde trees (Parkinsonia florida or Cercidium floridum). They feed primarily on the pollen of these trees, and thus have little or no need to venture to the ground. However, they are capable of consuming other foods, and it has even been suggested that they may occasionally forage on the ground to do so. Colonies range in size between ~50-200/300 individuals, and frequently have multiple reproductive queens. Because brood require several months to mature into adults, queens cannot adjust the ratio of soldiers to workers quickly enough to adapt to changing threats. Therefore, an effective strategy of soldier (major) deployment has evolved to maximize survival.
