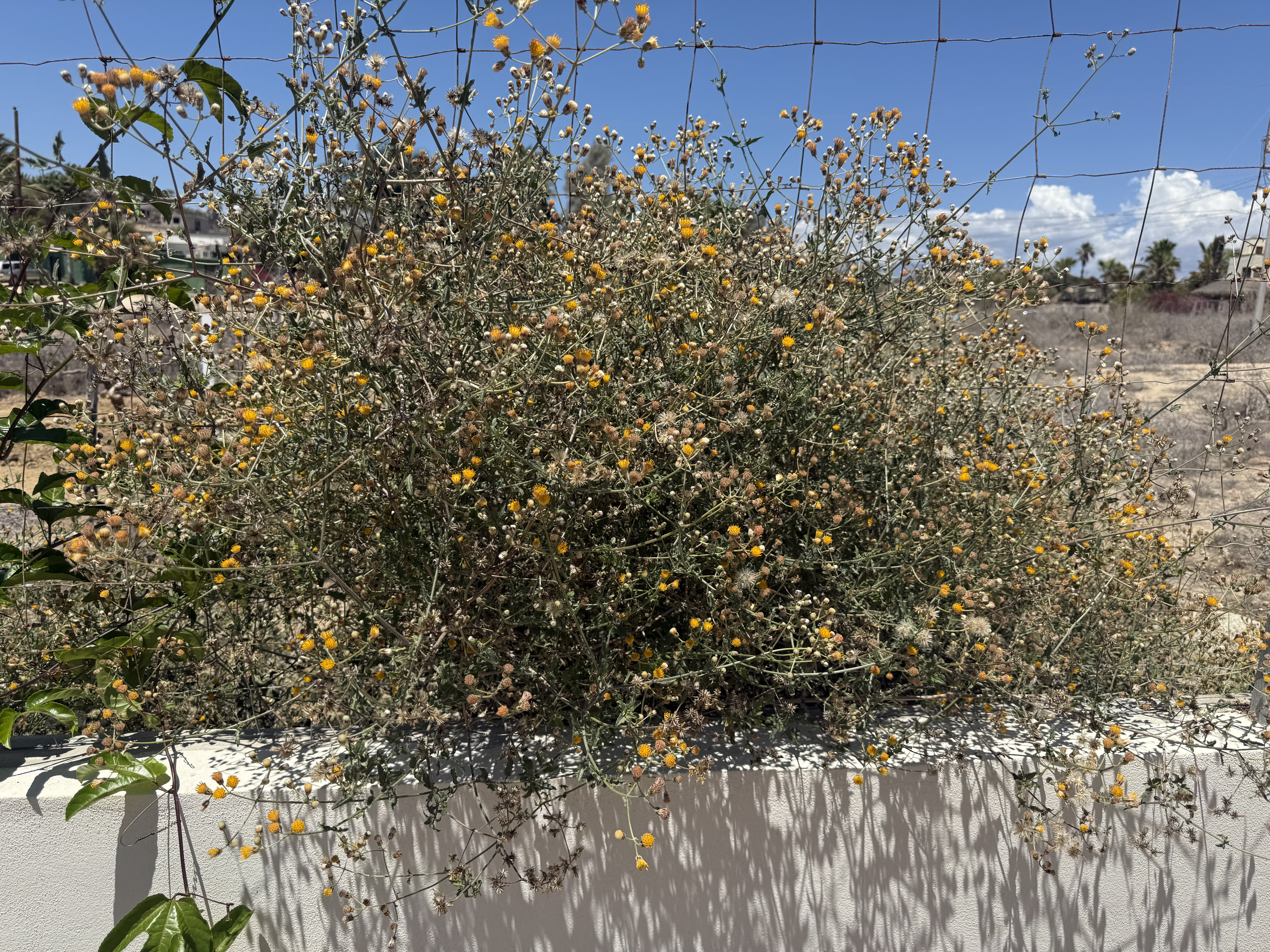

Scientific classification
- Kingdom: Plantae
- Clade: Tracheophytes
- Clade: Angiosperms
- Clade: Eudicots
- Clade: Asterids
- Order: Asterales
- Family: Asteraceae
- Genus: Bebbia
- Species: B. juncea
- Variety: B. j. var. atriplicifolia

Trinomial name
- Bebbia juncea var. atriplicifolia (A. Gray) I.M.Johnst., 1924.

Synonyms
- List: Bebbia atriplicifolia (A.Gray) Greene; Carphephorus atriplicifolius A.Gray

= Bebbia juncea var. atriplicifolia =

Species of flowering plant

Bebbia juncea var. atriplicifolia is variety of sweetbush belonging to the Asteraceae family. It is endemic to the state of Baja California Sur, Mexico, where it commonly grows along fences, forming natural hedges. It is also known as Cape sweetbush.

== Description ==
Bebbia juncea var. atriplicifolia is a flowering plant that grows to 6–8 ft (1.8–2.4 m) high, with many stems that have a tendency to hang over other plants. Its flowers are orange-yellow with a reportedly pleasant odor. It is a composite flower plant with a hispidulous stem that is sometimes glabrous. The leaves are petioled with triangular-ovate blades, 2 to 5 cm (0.79 to 1.97 in) long and 0.6 to 4 cm (0.24 to 1.57 in) wide that are hastately lobed or toothed. The flower heads may be several to numerous, cymose-panicled, with pedicels that are usually stipitate-glandular and hispidulous. The involucre is less pubescent and the phyllaries acute or acuminate.

== Distribution and habitat ==
Bebbia juncea var. atriplicifolia is found in sandy soils of desert and dry shrub biome in the Mexican state of Baja California Sur, where it is endemic.

== Taxonomy ==
The species was originally described as Carphephorus atriplicifolia by Asa Gray in 1861. It was later recategorized as Bebbia atriplicifolia by Asa Gray and Edward Lee Greene in 1885. It is primarily treated as a variety of Bebbia juncea per Asa Gray and I.M.Johnst (1924). The type specimen is from Cabo San Lucas.

== Gallery ==
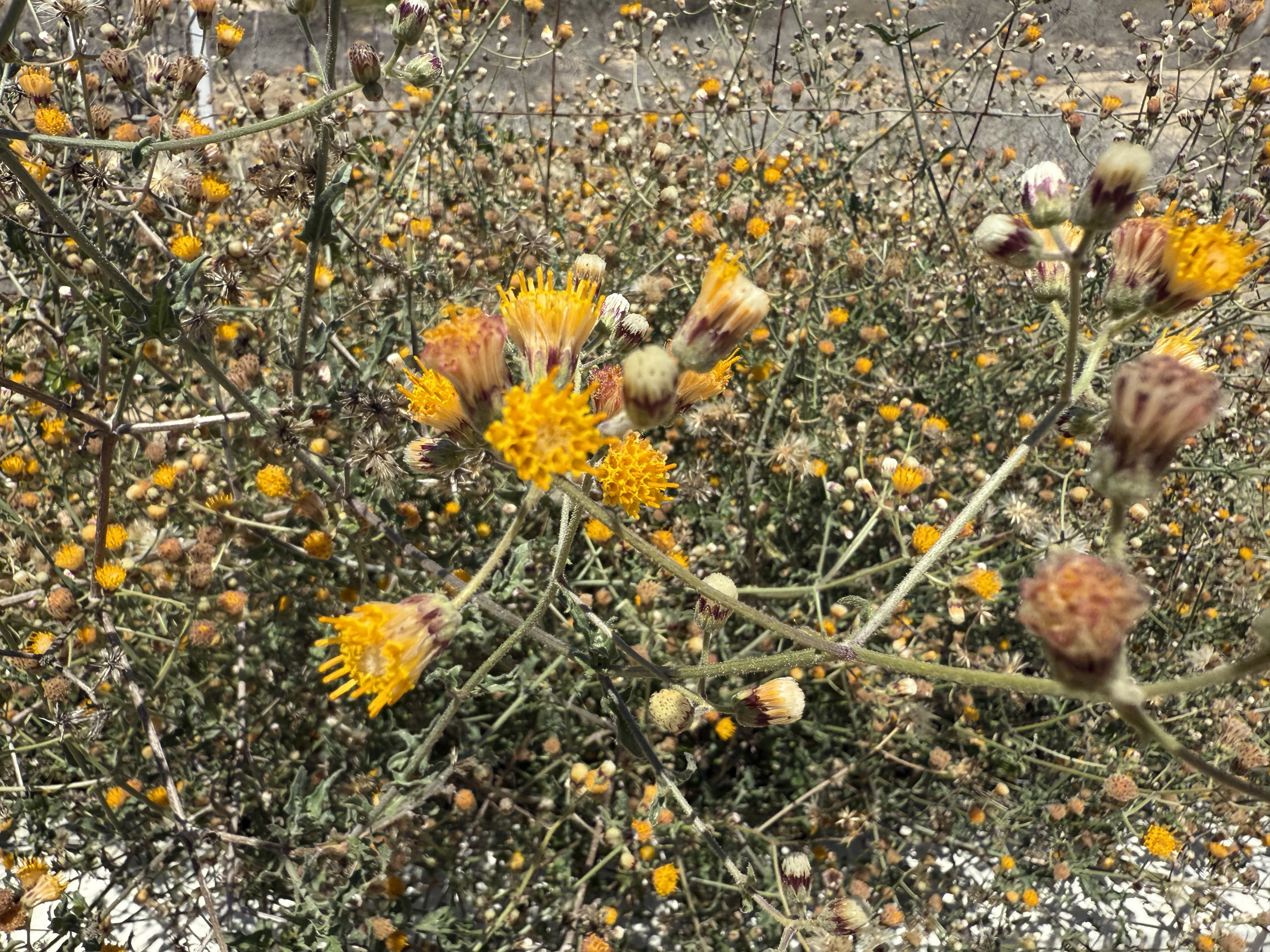
Cape sweetbush flowers

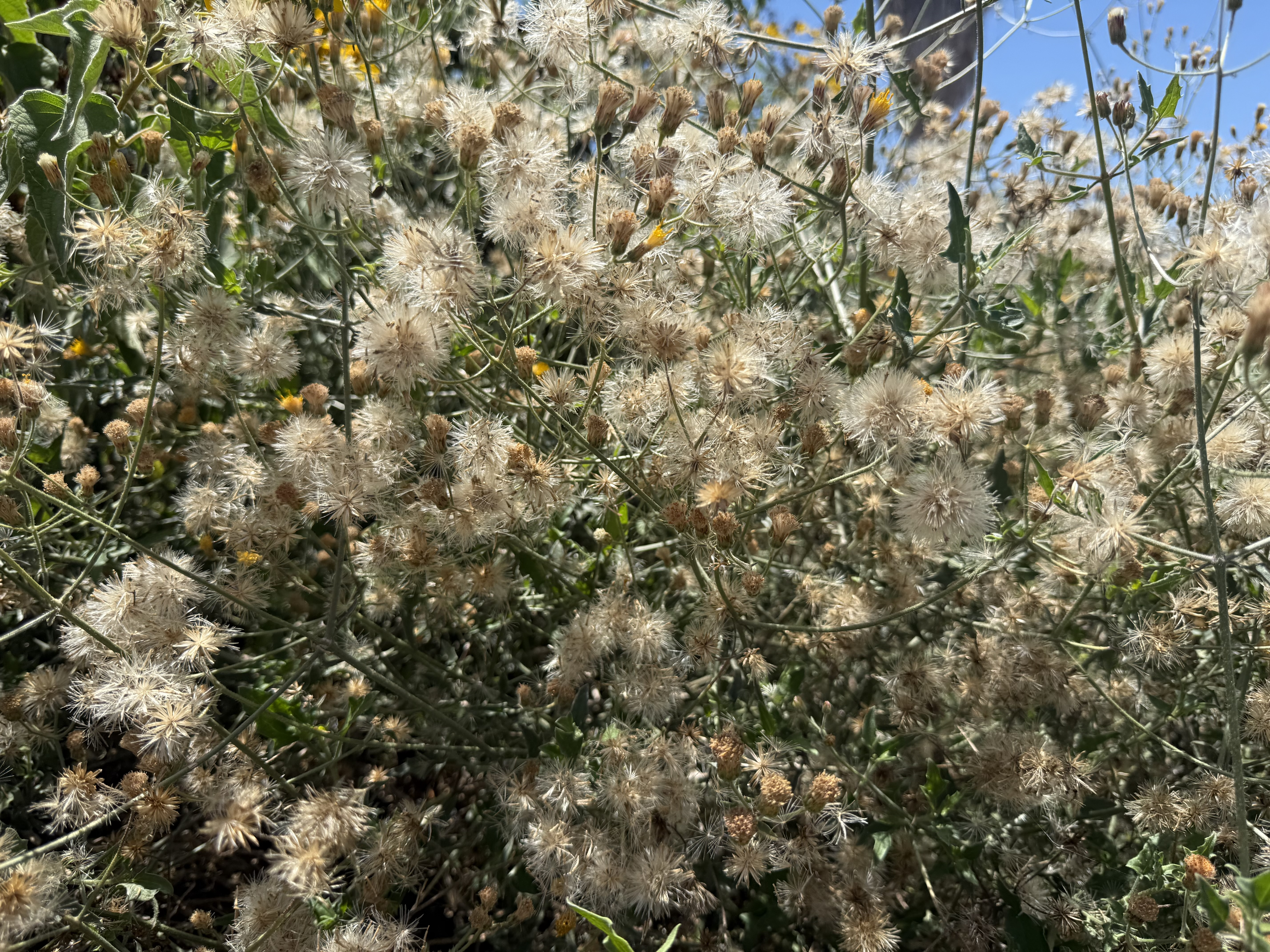
Cape sweetbush flowers in seed

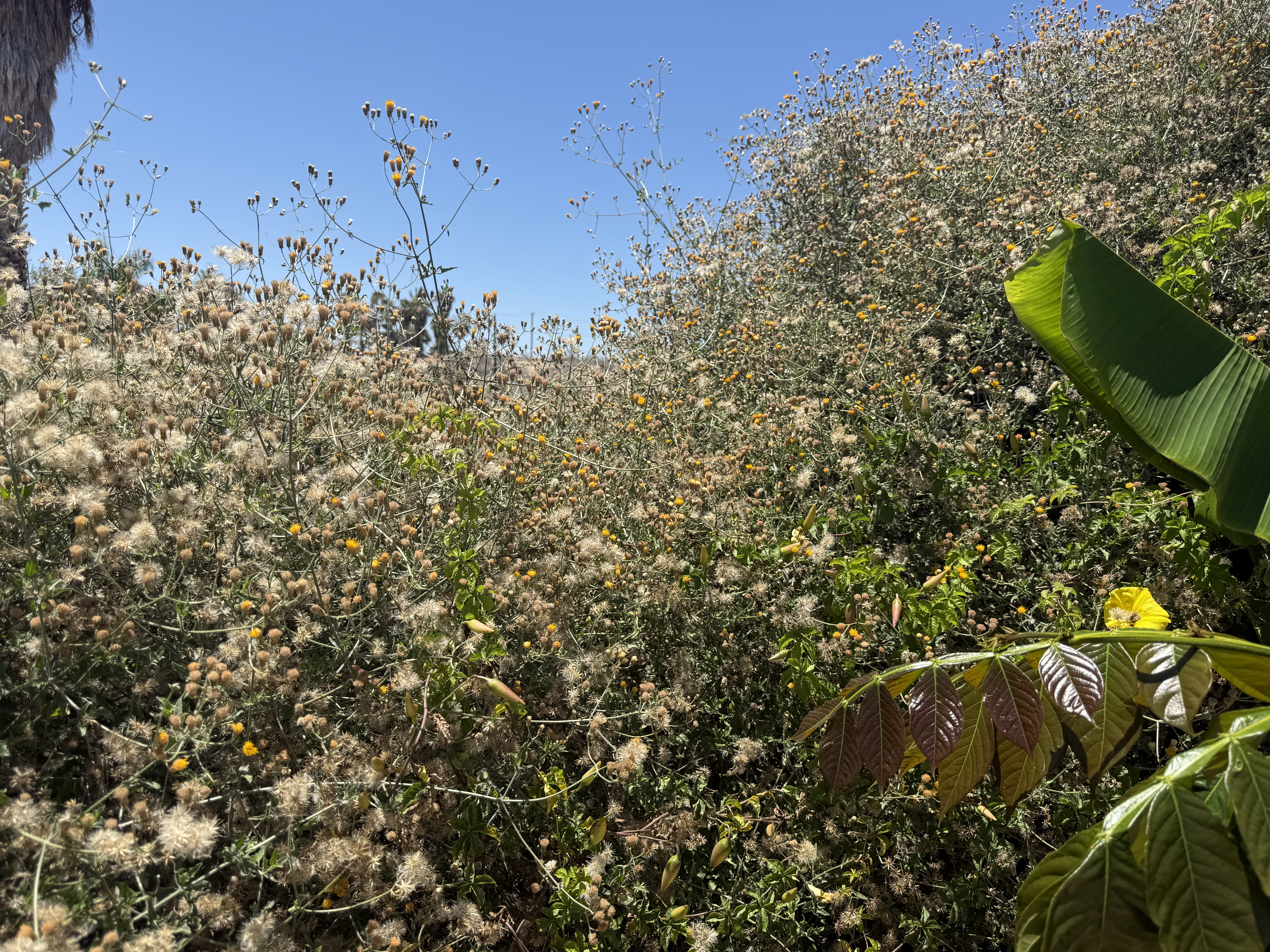
Example of a Cape sweetbush hedging along a fence
