= Rattlesnake master =

Rattlesnake master may refer to:

- Eryngium aquaticum, rattlesnakemaster; native to eastern North America
- Eryngium yuccifolium, rattlesnake master; a common herbaceous perennial plant, native to the tallgrass prairies of central North America
- Agave virginica, rattlesnake master; a species of flowering plant related to agaves

== See also ==
- Rattlesnake weed
