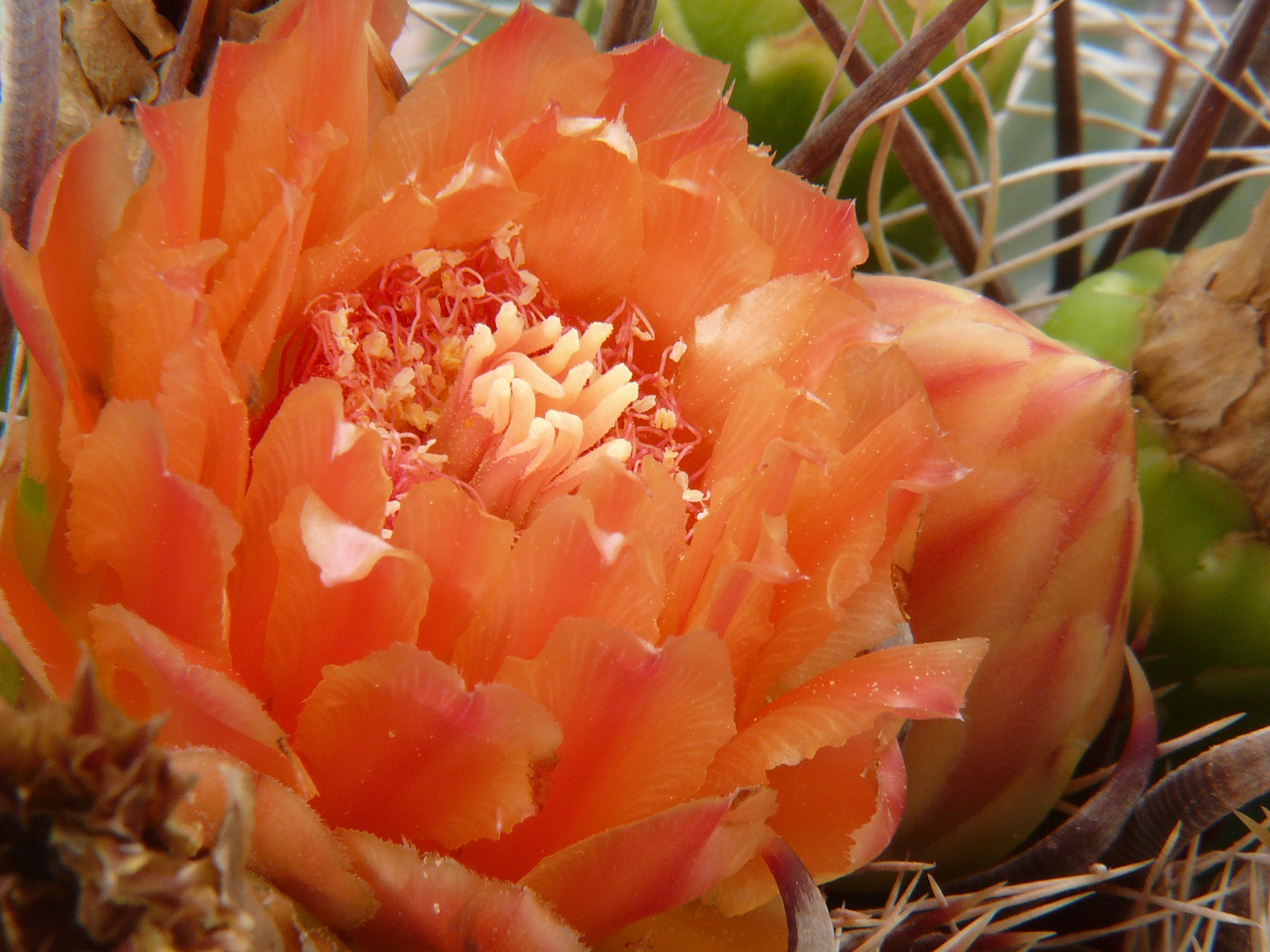

Conservation status
- Vulnerable (IUCN 3.1)

Scientific classification
- Kingdom: Plantae
- Clade: Embryophytes
- Clade: Tracheophytes
- Clade: Angiosperms
- Clade: Eudicots
- Order: Caryophyllales
- Family: Cactaceae
- Subfamily: Cactoideae
- Genus: Ferocactus
- Species: F. wislizeni

Binomial name
- Ferocactus wislizeni (Engelm.) Britt. & Rose

Synonyms
- List: Echinocactus wislizeni Engelm. 1848; Echinocactus arizonicus R.E.Kunze 1909; Echinocactus falconeri Orcutt 1902; Echinocactus wislizeni var. albispinus Toumey 1895; Echinocactus wislizeni f. albispinus (Toumey) Schelle 1926; Echinocactus wislizeni var. albus Costantin & Poiss. 1907; Echinocactus wislizeni var. decipiens Engelm. 1878 publ. 1879; Echinocactus wislizeni var. latispinus Schelle 1907; Echinocactus wislizeni f. phoeniceus (R.E.Kunze) Schelle 1926; Echinocactus wislizeni var. phoeniceus R.E.Kunze 1913; Ferocactus arizonicus (R.E.Kunze) Orcutt 1926; Ferocactus falconeri (Orcutt) Orcutt 1926; Ferocactus phoeniceus (R.E.Kunze) Orcutt 1926; Ferocactus wislizeni subsp. ajoensis Fencl & Kalas 2013; Ferocactus wislizeni var. ajoensis Fencl & Kalas 2012; Ferocactus wislizeni var. albispinus (Toumey) Y.Itô 1952; Ferocactus wislizeni var. flalconeri (Orcutt) Y.Itô 1981; Ferocactus wislizeni var. phoeniceus (R.E.Kunze) Y.Itô 1952

= Ferocactus wislizeni =

Species of cactus

Ferocactus wislizeni, the fishhook barrel cactus, also called Arizona barrel cactus, candy barrel cactus, and Southwestern barrel cactus, is a species of flowering plant in the cactus family Cactaceae, native to northern Mexico and the southern United States. It is a ball-shaped cactus eventually growing to a cylindrical shape, with spiny ribs and red or yellow flowers in summer.

Some sources mistakenly spell the epithet "wislizenii." The correct spelling is with one "i," per ICN article 60C.2.

== Description ==
The fishhook barrel cactus typically grows to a diameter of roughly 2.25 ft (0.69 m) and a height of 3–6 ft (0.91–1.83 m). However, specimens as wide as 3 ft (0.91 m) and tall as 10 ft (3.0 m) have been recorded. The common name comes from the spines, which are thick and hooked. It has a leathery asparagus green cortex (skin) with approximately 15-28 ribs per cactus. Its flowers are yellow to red-orange and appear atop the cactus fruit during the summer months. The fruits are green when unripe, yellow after the flower dries up, and persist atop the cactus long after the flower is gone, sometimes for more than a year.

In adulthood, fishhook barrel cacti generally lean southward, toward the sun, earning them the nickname "compass barrel cactus." One theory about why this happens is, the afternoon sun is so intense it slows the growth on the exposed side, causing the plant to grow unevenly. Older barrels can lean so far they uproot themselves and fall over, especially after heavy rains when the soil is loose. Its life cycle is 50–100 years.

Like Sclerocactus, Ferocactus typically grows in areas where water flows irregularly or depressions where water can accumulate for short periods of time. They are not associated with washes and arroyos but rather grow along rocky ridges and open bajadas.

The "fishhook" spines and the armored web of spines enclosing the cactus body are a defense against herbivory. Rarely a mature barrel cactus is found hollowed out by javelina but overall prickly pear experience much higher levels of damage from more species. Barrel cactus spines pose an extreme hazard for handling, penetrating boots and gloves. The roots are quite long but very shallow.

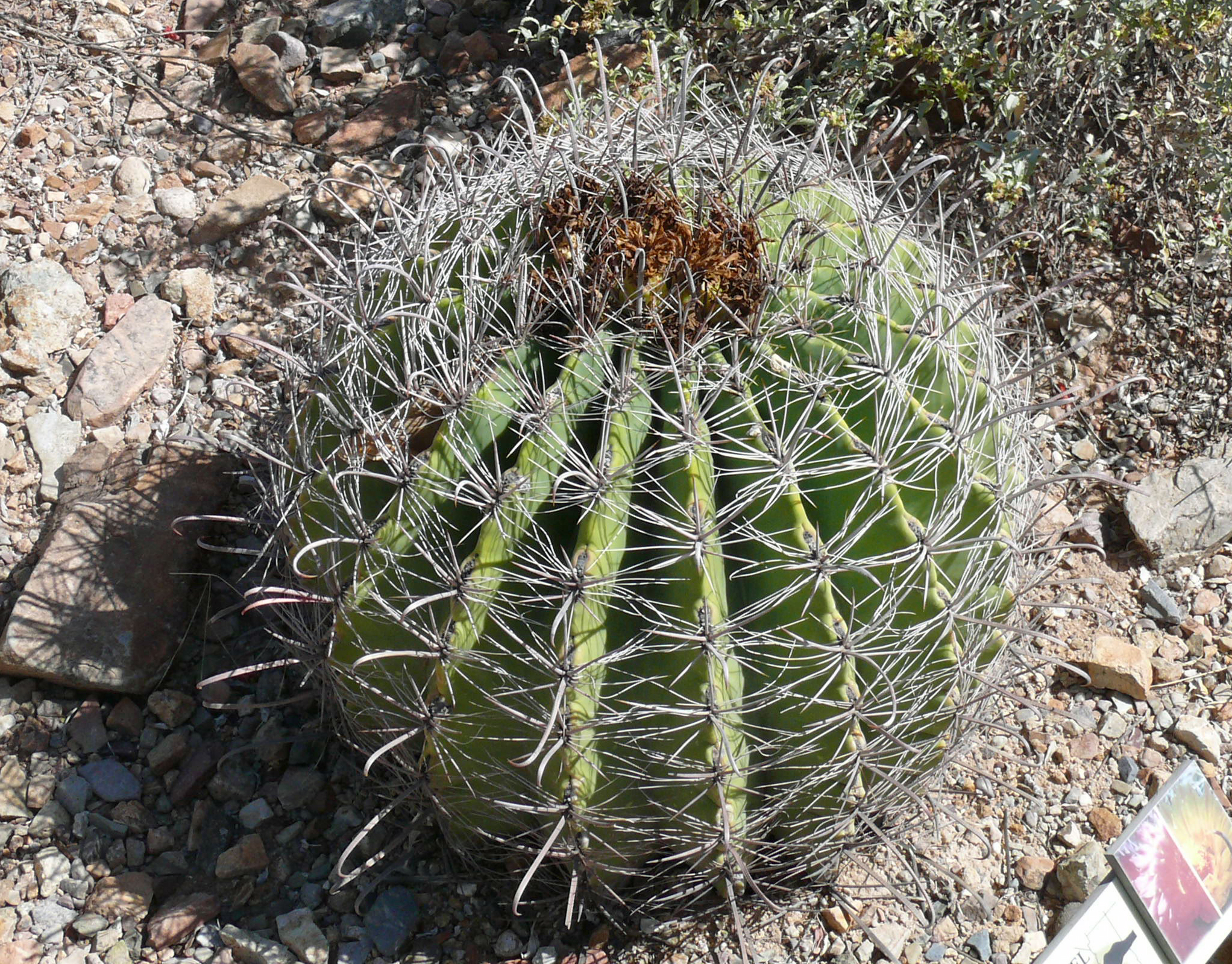
Young Fishhook barrel cactus (Ferocactus wislizeni)

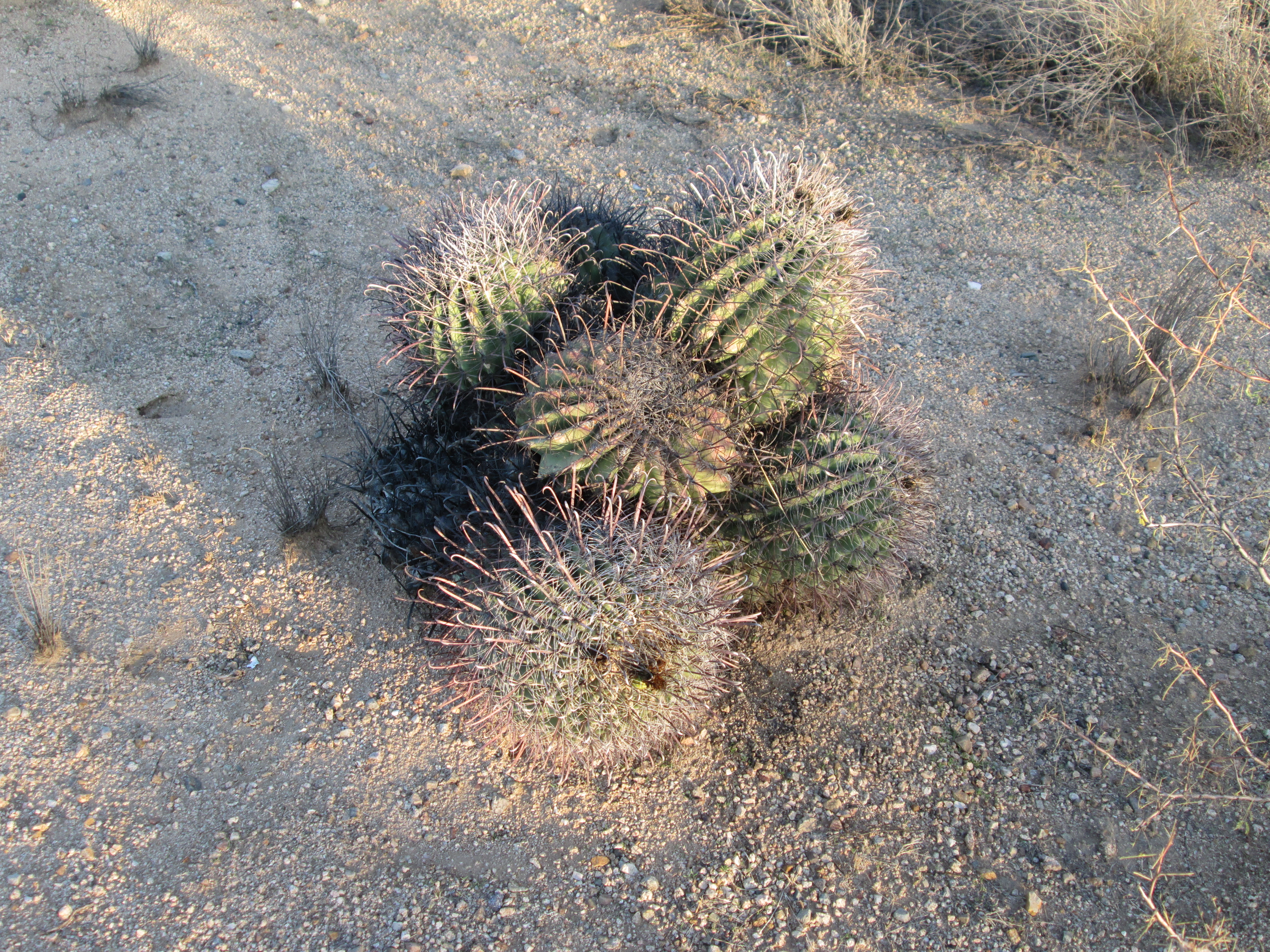
Fishhook barrel cactus cluster near Sahuarita, Arizona.

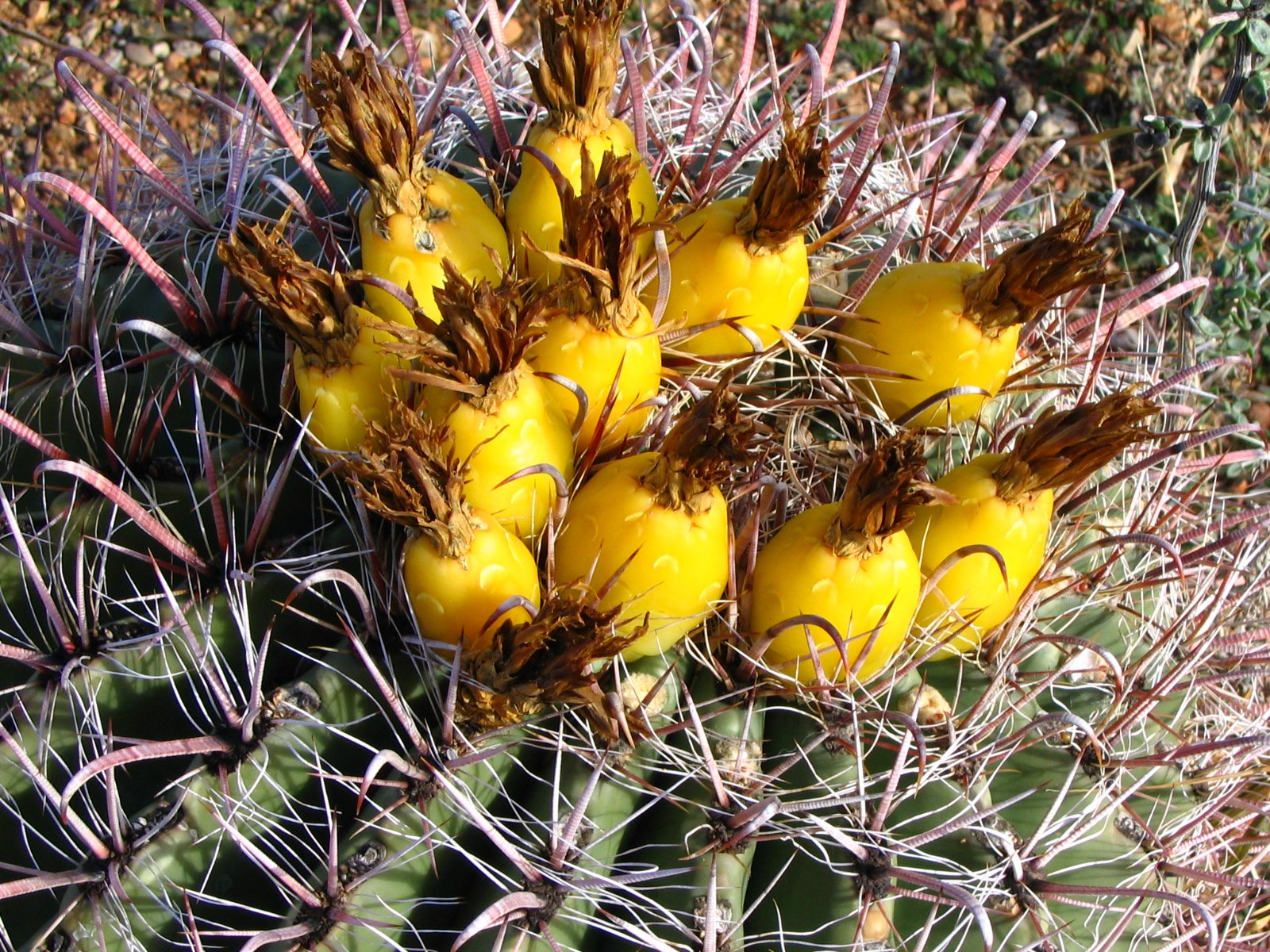
Fruit atop a fishhook barrel cactus.

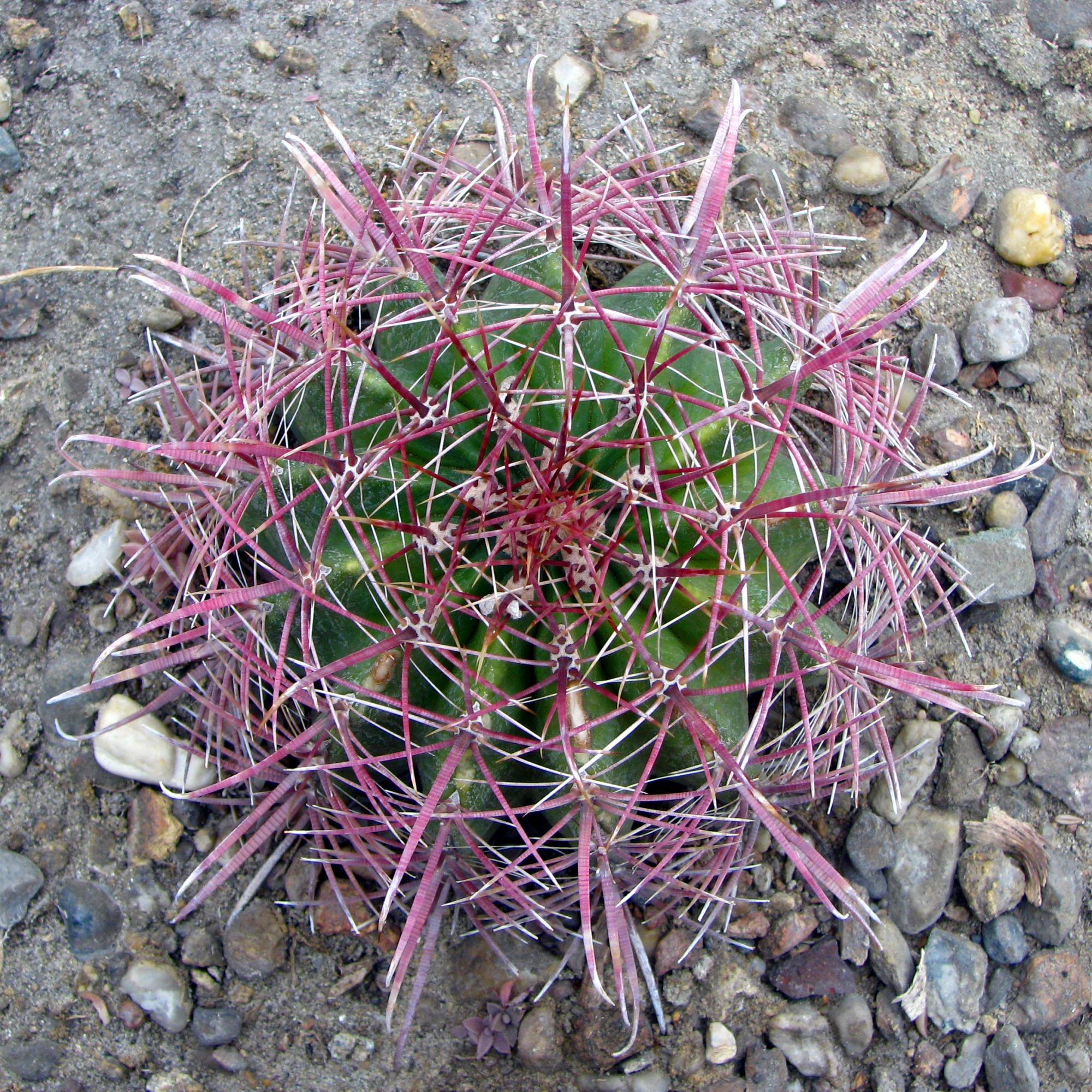
Top view of young Fishhook Barrel

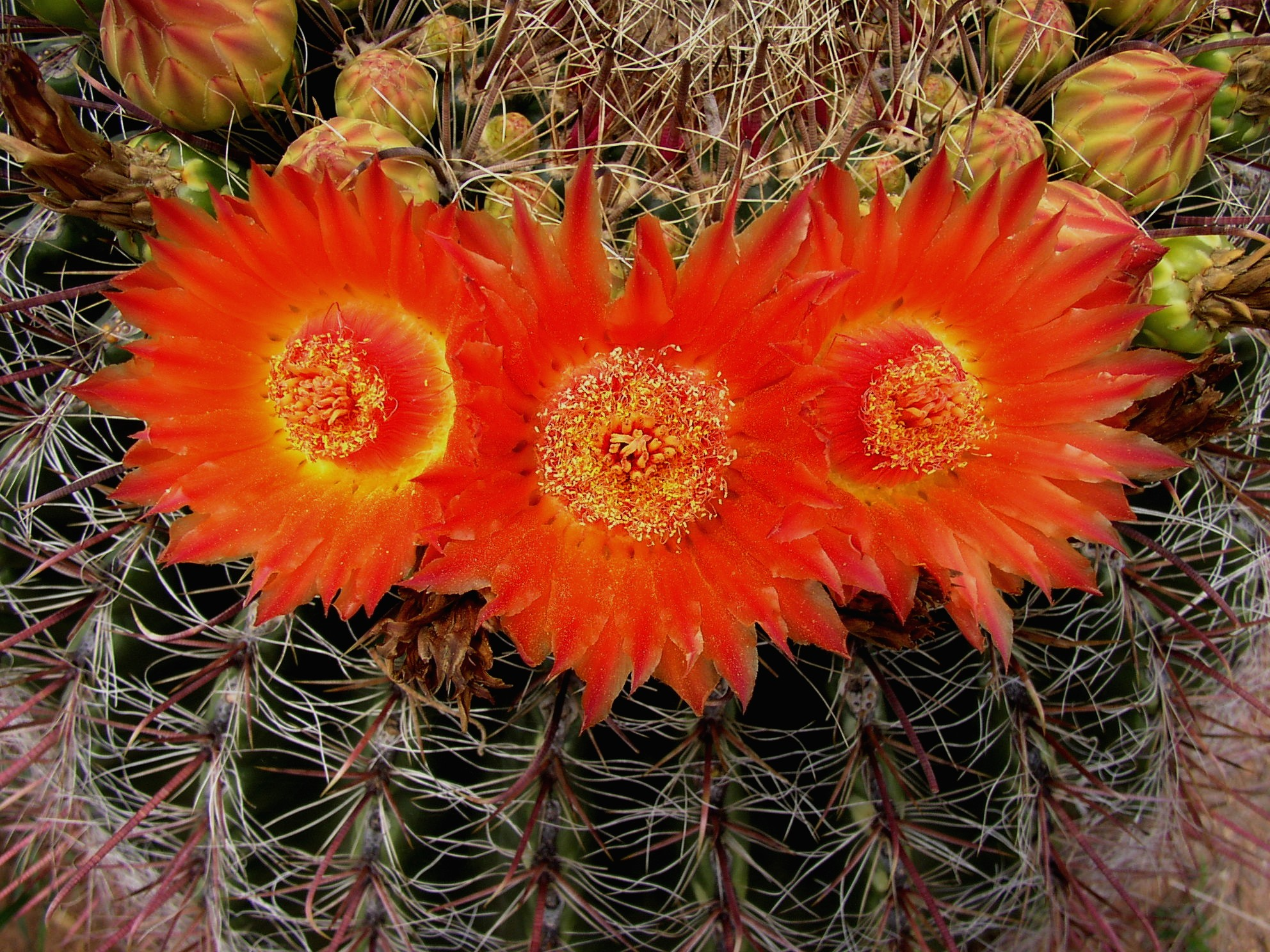
Flowers

== Distribution ==
The fishhook barrel cactus is native to southwestern United States and northwestern Mexico. More specifically, it can be found in southern Arizona, southern New Mexico, El Paso County, Texas and northern Sonora, Sinaloa, and Chihuahua, Mexico. It grows in gravelly or sandy soil, more commonly on bajadas than steep slopes, at 1000 to 5300 feet (300–1600 m) elevation. It prefers full sun, and does well in hot arid climates. It is, however, frost-tolerant to 5 °F (-15 °C)

=== Ecology ===
The flowers are pollinated by cactus bees (Lithurge spp.). Mule deer, birds, Antelope Ground Squirrels and javelina eat the fruit. The birds especially like the seeds. The people of the Sonoran Desert use the fruit for candy and jelly. The Seri and O'odham eat the flowers and use the fruit, which is sour, as emergency food. Tradition says that the barrel cactus is a source of water for people lost without water in the desert. There are records of the southwestern Native Americans using it for that purpose, but the water contains oxalic acid and is likely to cause diarrhea if ingested on an empty stomach.

The skin thickens with age, making older cacti more fire resistant. Even so, average mortality due to fire is 50 to 67 percent within the first two years following fire.

In urban areas, the Fishhook Barrel is valued as an ornamental plant. It is drought tolerant and good for xeriscaping, and it is also a low-maintenance full-sun plant.

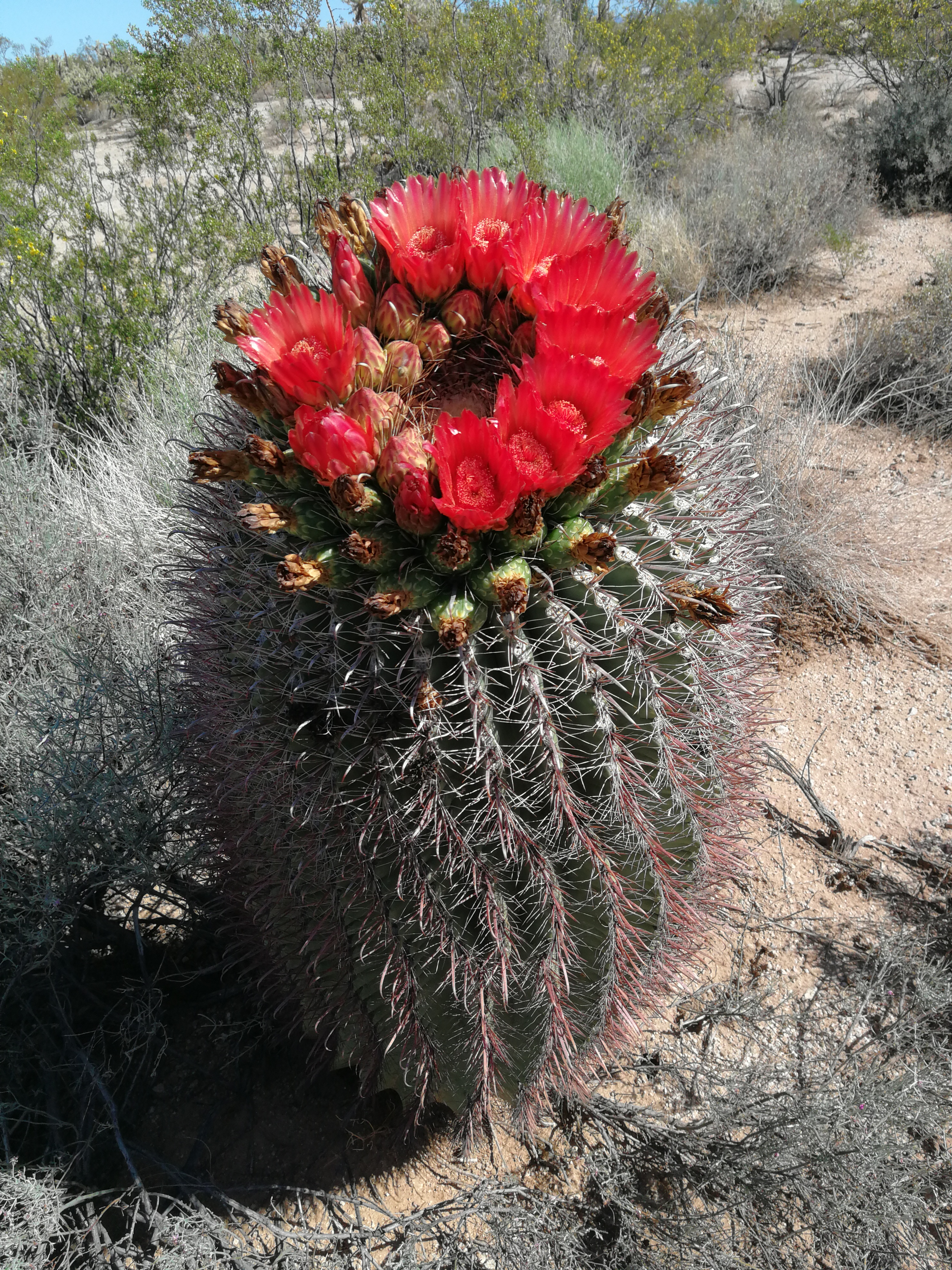
Ferocactus wislizeni habitat near Florence, Arizona.

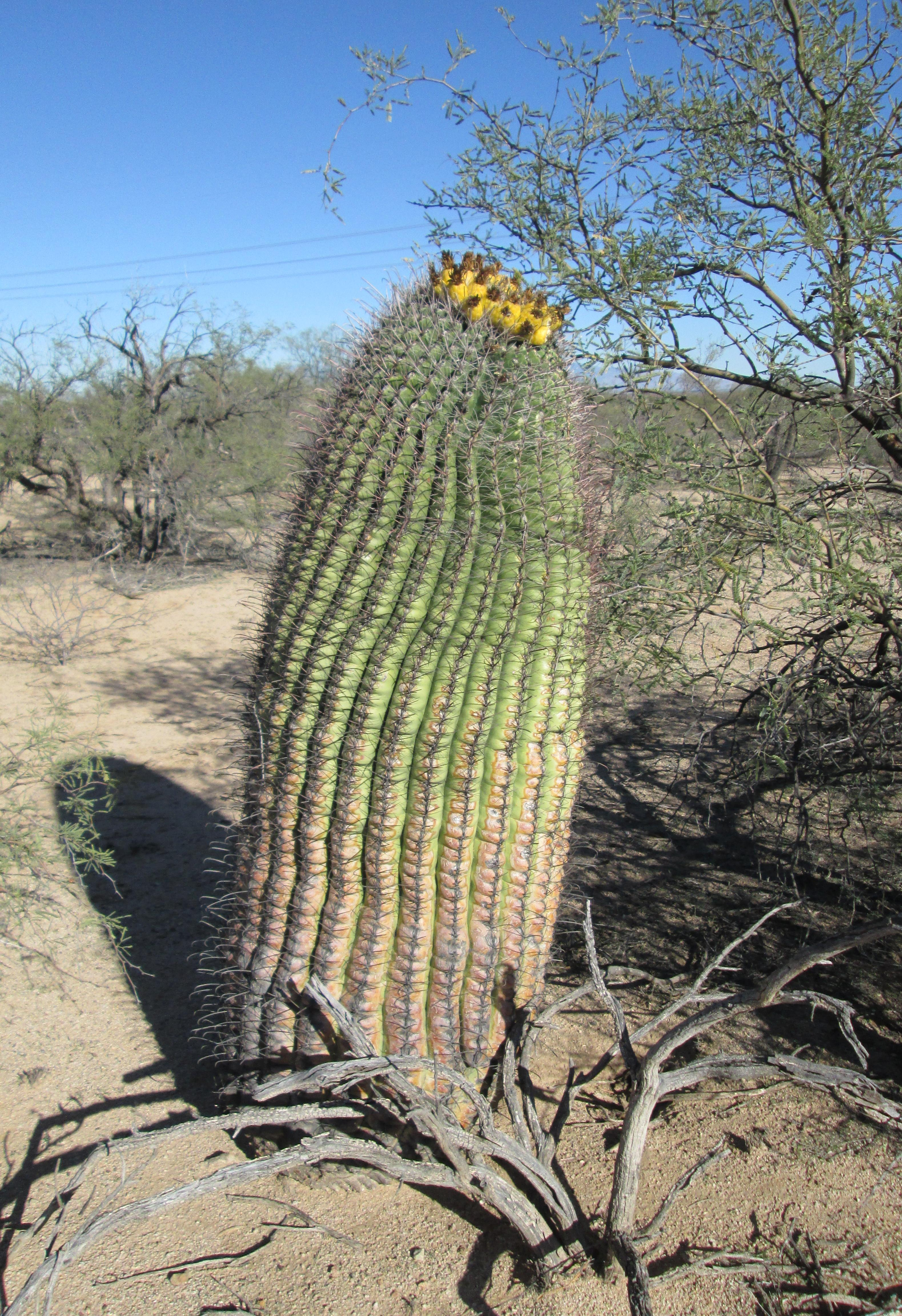
Large fishhook barrel cactus near Sahuarita, Arizona

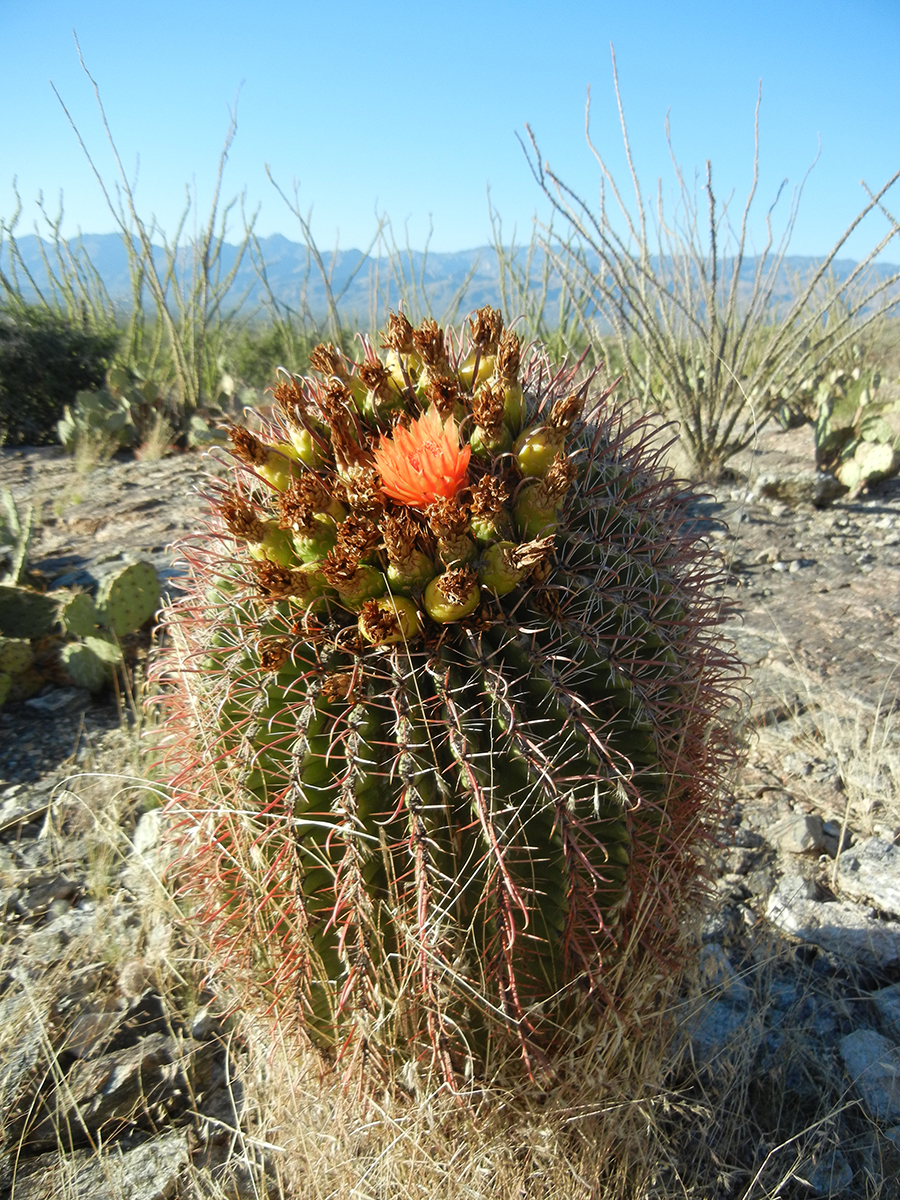
Fishhook barrel cactus in Saguaro National Park

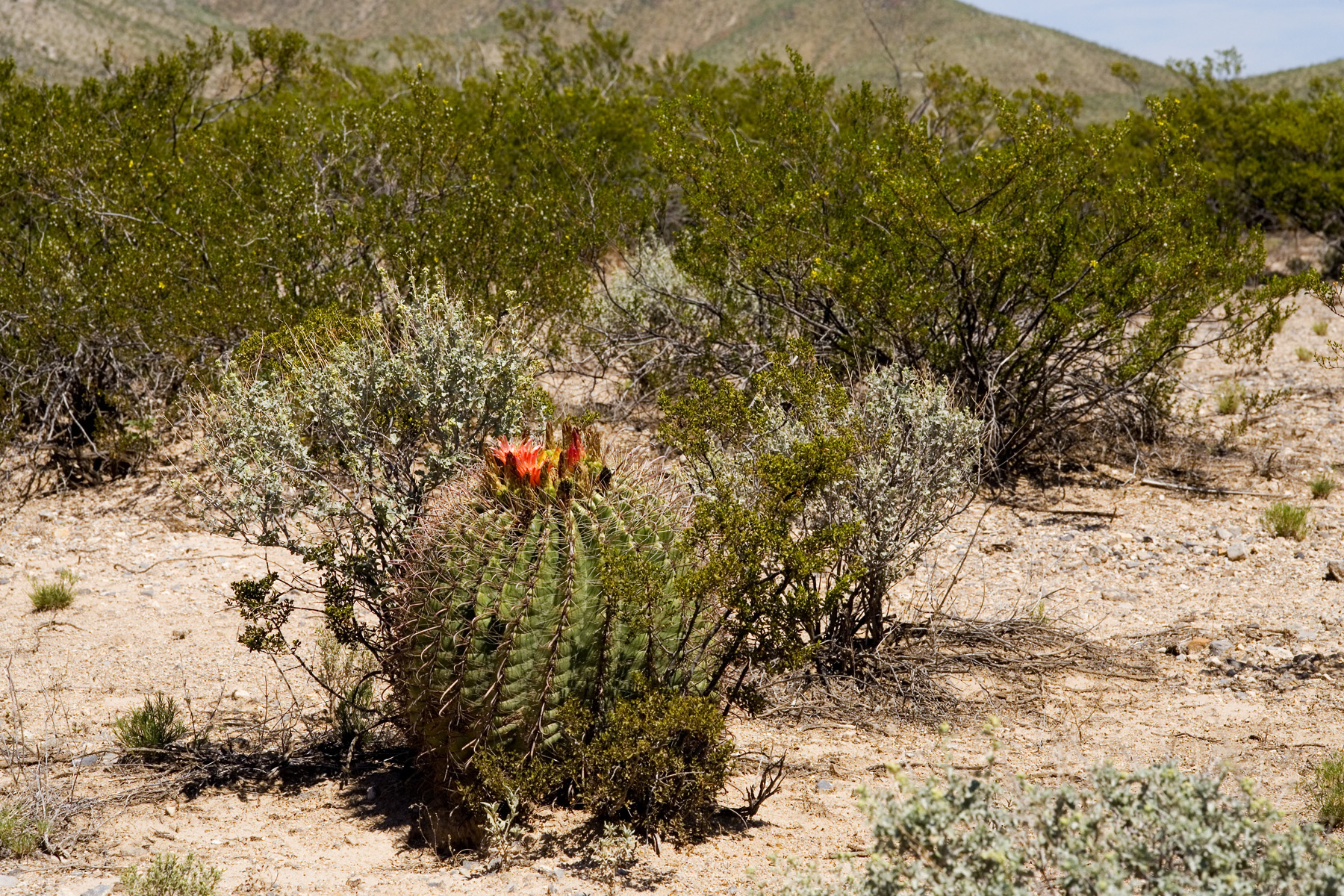
Ferocactus wislizenii, growing in habitat in Hidalgo County, New Mexico

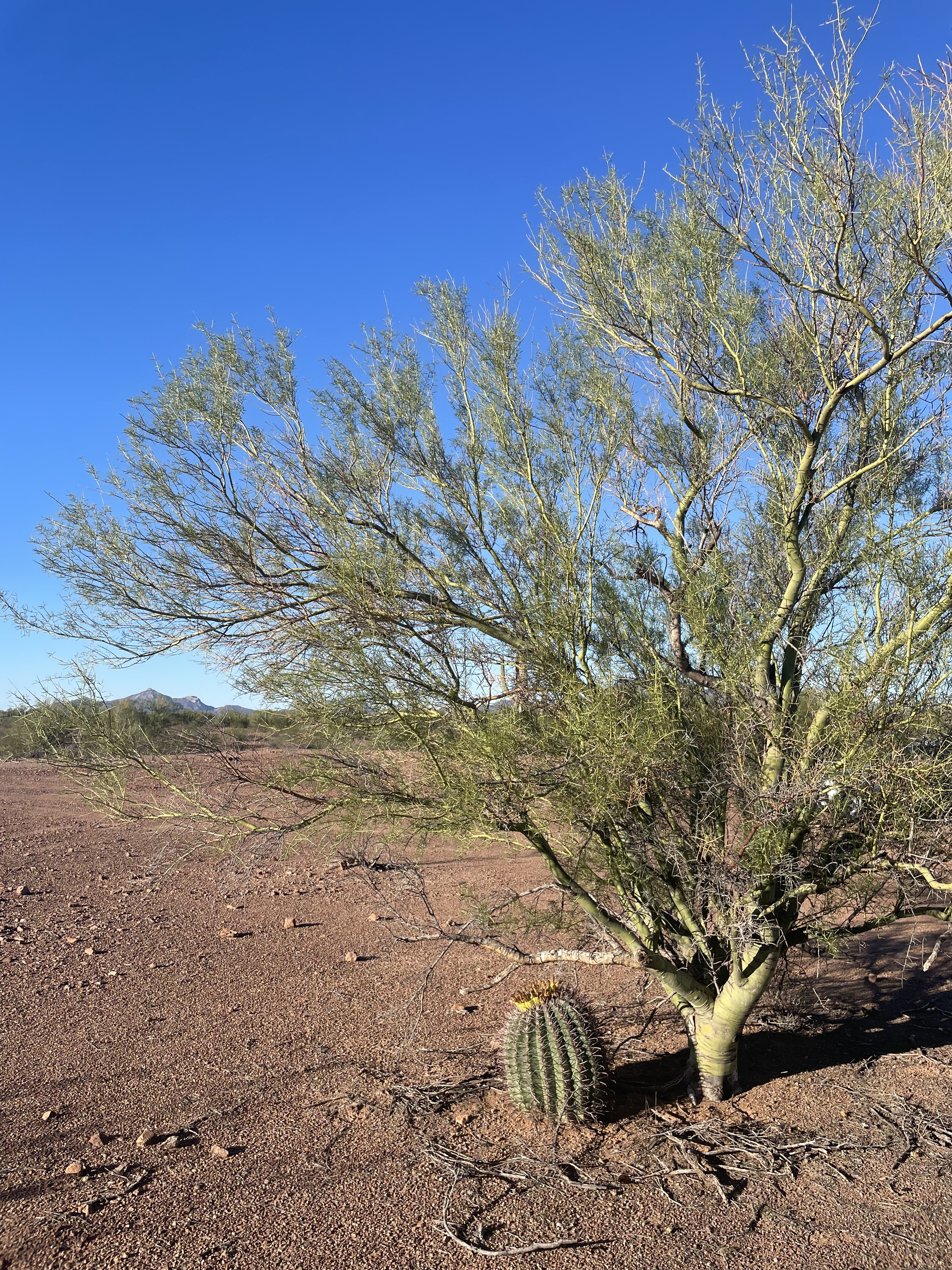
Fishhook Cactus growing beneath a Palo Verde tree in Ironwood Forest National Monument.

== Taxonomy ==
This species was first described as Echinocactus wislizeni in 1848 by George Engelmann. Nathaniel Lord Britton and Joseph Nelson Rose placed the species in the genus Ferocactus in 1922.
