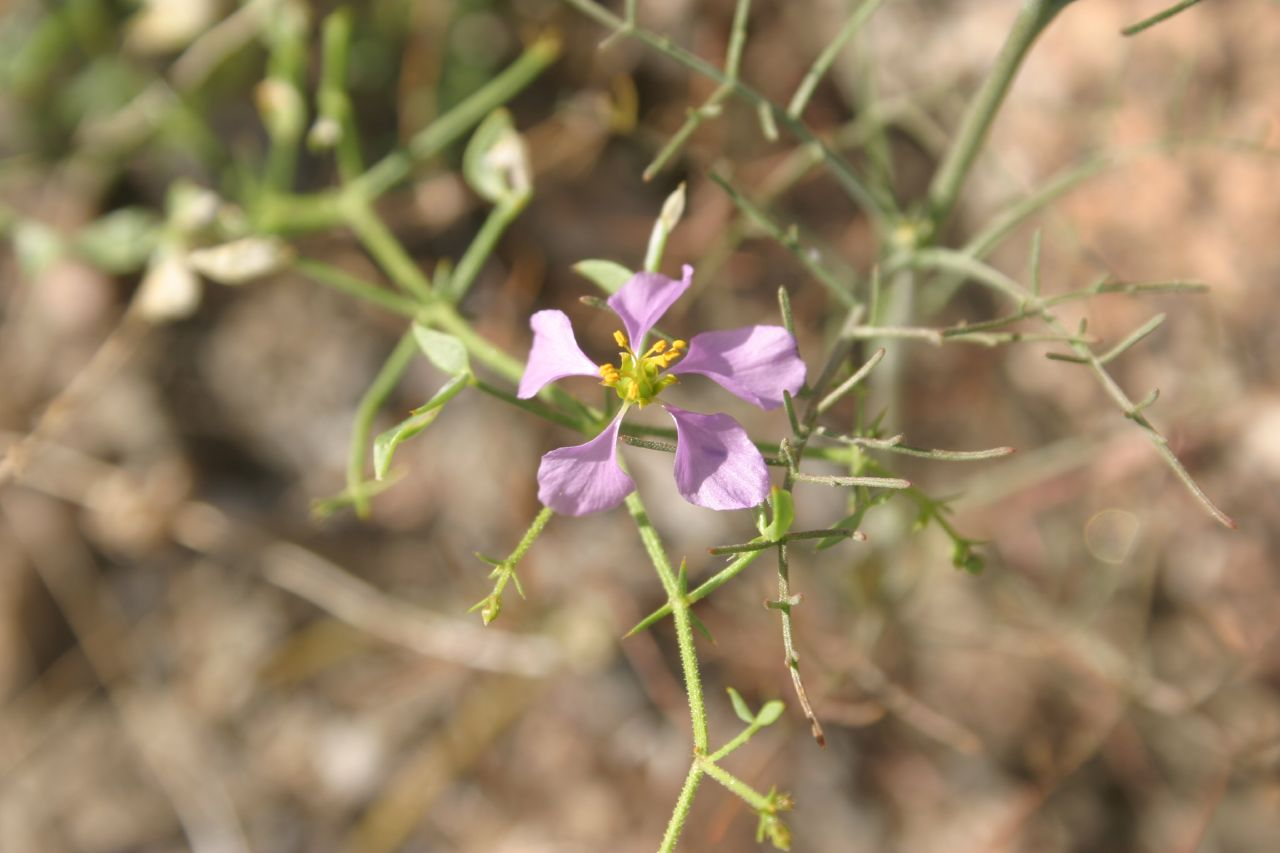

Conservation status
- Apparently Secure (NatureServe)

Scientific classification
- Kingdom: Plantae
- Clade: Tracheophytes
- Clade: Angiosperms
- Clade: Eudicots
- Clade: Rosids
- Order: Zygophyllales
- Family: Zygophyllaceae
- Genus: Fagonia
- Species: F. pachyacantha

Binomial name
- Fagonia pachyacantha Rydb.

= Fagonia pachyacantha =

Species of flowering plant

Fagonia pachyacantha is a species of flowering plant in the caltrop family known by the common name sticky fagonbush. It is native to the Sonoran Desert of northwest Mexico in Sonora and the Lower Colorado River Valley area at the California and Arizona border.

== Description ==
Fagonia pachyacantha is a spreading perennial herb not more than 1 metre (3.3 ft) in height with very glandular stems and foliage. Each leaf is divided into three flat, green leaflets and there are straight, pointed, spine-like stipules at the base of each set.

Flowers, each about 1.5 centimeters wide, appear in the axils of the sparse leaves. The flower has five purplish pink petals with bases narrowed to thin claws. The fruit is a rounded capsule about half a centimeter long.
