= Rattlesnake weed =

Rattlesnake weed may refer to several plant species used in folk medicine to treat snakebites, such as:

- Daucus pusillus
- Euphorbia albomarginata
- Hieracium venosum
- Stachys floridana

== See also ==
- Rattlesnakemaster
