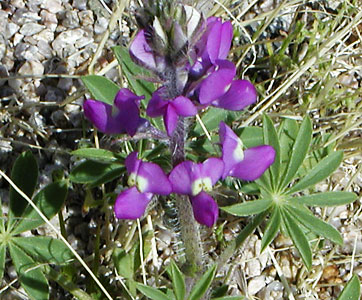

Scientific classification
- Kingdom: Plantae
- Clade: Tracheophytes
- Clade: Angiosperms
- Clade: Eudicots
- Clade: Rosids
- Order: Fabales
- Family: Fabaceae
- Subfamily: Faboideae
- Genus: Lupinus
- Subgenus: Lupinus subg. Platycarpos
- Species: L. arizonicus

Binomial name
- Lupinus arizonicus S.Watson

= Lupinus arizonicus =

Species of legume

Lupinus arizonicus, the Arizona lupine, is a flowering plant in the legume family Fabaceae, native to the Mojave and Sonoran Deserts of North America, where it can be found growing in open places and sandy washes below 1,100 metres (3,600 ft) elevation. It is common around Joshua Tree National Park and Death Valley National Park in California.

== Description ==
It is an annual plant growing to 10–50 centimetres (3.9–19.7 in) in height. The leaves are palmately compound with 6–10 leaflets, each leaflet 1–4 centimetres (0.39–1.57 in) long and 5–10 millimetres (0.20–0.39 in) broad, on a 2.5–7 centimetres (0.98–2.76 in) long petiole. The flowers are magenta to dark pink, 7–10 mm long, with 20–50 or more flowers in a tall spike. It is a host of the moth species, Helicoverpa zea.
