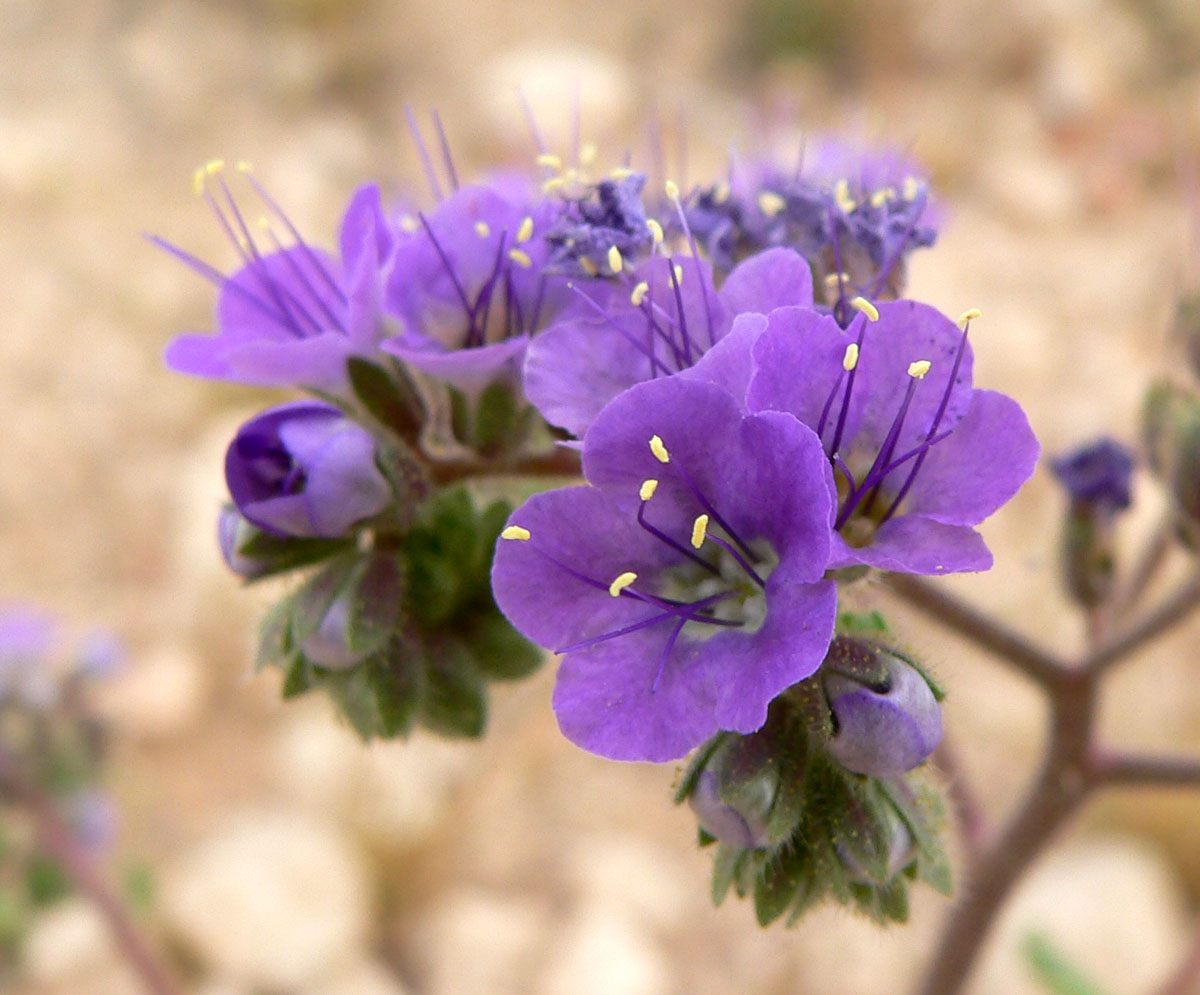

Conservation status
- Secure (NatureServe)

Scientific classification
- Kingdom: Plantae
- Clade: Tracheophytes
- Clade: Angiosperms
- Clade: Eudicots
- Clade: Asterids
- Order: Boraginales
- Family: Hydrophyllaceae
- Genus: Phacelia
- Species: P. crenulata

Binomial name
- Phacelia crenulata Torr. ex S.Watson

= Phacelia crenulata =

Species of plant

Phacelia crenulata is a species of flowering plant in the waterleaf family, Hydrophyllaceae. Its common names include notch-leaf scorpion-weed, notch-leaved phacelia, cleftleaf wildheliotrope, and heliotrope phacelia. Phacelia crenulata has an antitropical distribution, a type of disjunct distribution where a species exists at comparable latitudes on opposite sides of the equator, but not at the tropics. In North America, it is native to the southwestern United States as far east as Colorado and New Mexico, and Baja California and Sonora in Mexico. In South America, it is native to southern Peru, western Bolivia, and northern Chile.

== Description ==
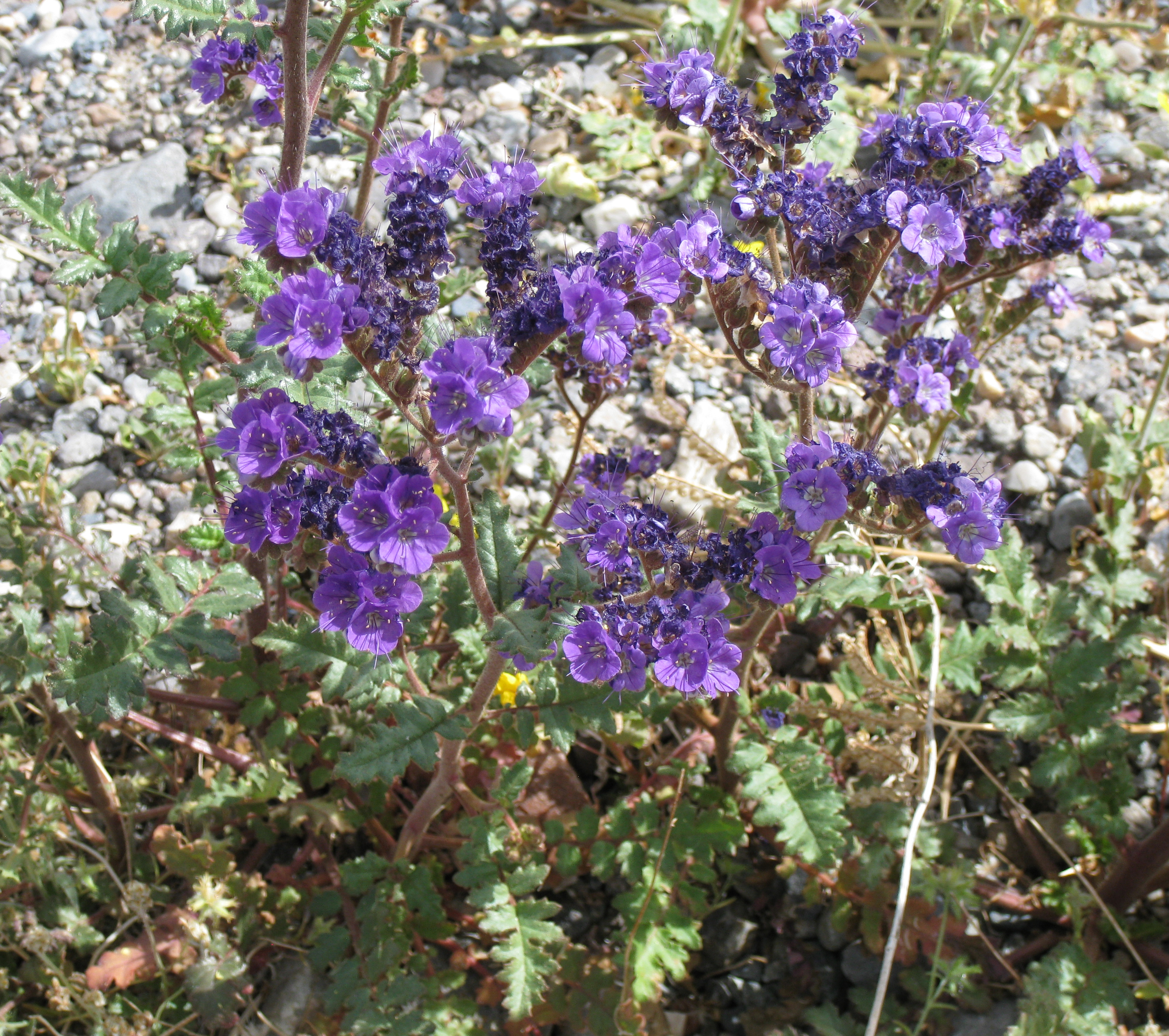
Phacelia crenulata flowers and leaves

This species is an aromatic annual plant growing up to 80 centimeters (32 in) tall. It is coated in stiff, glandular hairs. The leaves are 2 to 12 centimeters long, the largest occurring around the base of the stem and those higher on the stem much smaller. They are generally oblong in shape with wavy or lobed edges. The inflorescence is a coiled cyme of several flowers. The flower has a bell-shaped purple or blue corolla up to a centimeter long. The corolla has a white tube and sometimes a white throat. The stamens and style are well exserted from mouth of the flower. The fruit is a somewhat rounded capsule a few millimeters wide.

== Taxonomy ==
There are two to five varieties of the species, including:

- P. crenulata var. ambigua – rangewide; purple flowers up to 10 millimeters long
- P. crenulata var. crenulata – California to Utah; purple flowers up to 7 millimeters long
- P. crenulata var. minutiflora – California, Arizona, Baja California; white-throated lavender to blue flowers up to 4 millimeters long

The varieties can intergrade in some areas.

== Impacts ==
As do many other phacelias, this species causes contact dermatitis.
