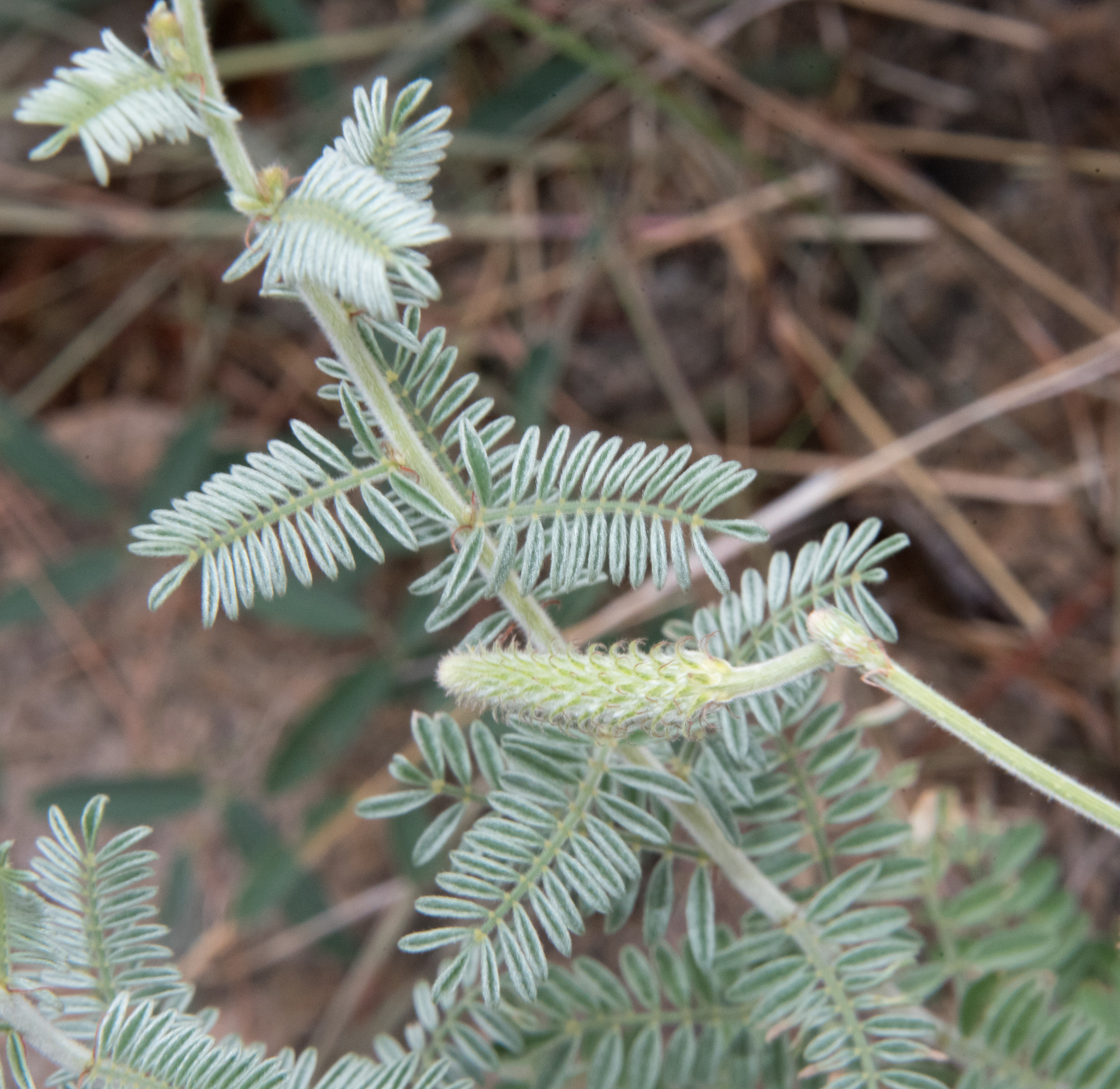

Conservation status
- Apparently Secure (NatureServe)

Scientific classification
- Kingdom: Plantae
- Clade: Embryophytes
- Clade: Tracheophytes
- Clade: Angiosperms
- Clade: Eudicots
- Clade: Rosids
- Order: Fabales
- Family: Fabaceae
- Subfamily: Faboideae
- Genus: Dalea
- Species: D. albiflora

Binomial name
- Dalea albiflora A. Gray

= Dalea albiflora =

Species of legume

Dalea albiflora, the whiteflower prairie clover or scruffy prairie clover, is a perennial subshrub or herb of the subfamily Faboideae in the pea family-(Fabaceae). It is found in the southwestern United States and Northwestern Mexico in the states of Arizona, New Mexico, Sonora, and Chihuahua.

Whiteflower prairie clover is a low-lying subshrub with horizontal spreading gray-green pinnate leaves. The flowers are vertical with multiple inflorescences; both flowers and leaves are extremely oily and resinous, and leave perfume-like odors on any surface: hands, boots, etc.

== Western Sonoran Desert specifics ==
In the western Sonoran Desert of southwest Arizona, scruffy prairie clover can be found throughout flatland mesas. It is also found in mountainous regions, for example the Muggins Mountains Wilderness on south and southwest facing ridgelines and flats.
