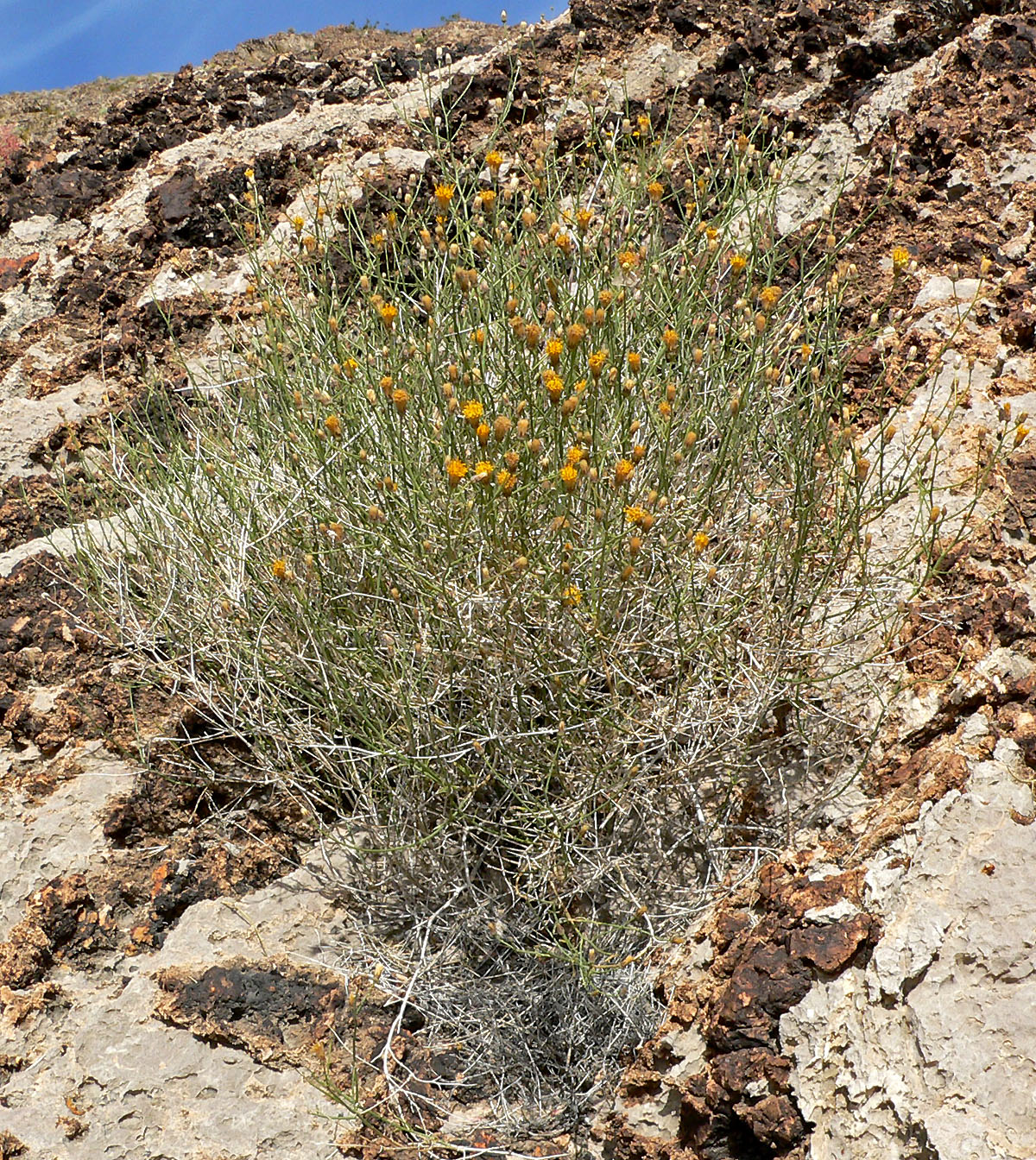
- Bebbia juncea var. aspera

Scientific classification
- Kingdom: Plantae
- Clade: Tracheophytes
- Clade: Angiosperms
- Clade: Eudicots
- Clade: Asterids
- Order: Asterales
- Family: Asteraceae
- Subfamily: Asteroideae
- Tribe: Millerieae
- Genus: Bebbia; Greene
- Species: B. juncea

Binomial name
- Bebbia juncea (Benth.) Greene

Synonyms
- Of the genus: Carphephorus section Kuhniodes Benth.; Of the species: Carphephorus junceus Benth.

= Bebbia =

Sweetbush

Genus of flowering plants

Bebbia, common name sweetbush, is a genus of aromatic shrubs in the family Asteraceae. Its only species is Bebbia juncea.

It is native to the southwestern United States (California, Nevada, Arizona, southwestern Utah, southwestern New Mexico, and extreme western Texas (El Paso County)) and northern Mexico (Sonora, Baja California, Baja California Sur). It bears plentiful yellow discoid flowers.

== Varieties ==
As of May 2024, Plants of the World Online accepted three varieties of Bebbia juncea:

- Bebbia juncea var. aspera Greene
- Bebbia juncea var. atriplicifolia (A.Gray) I.M.Johnst.
- Bebbia juncea var. juncea
