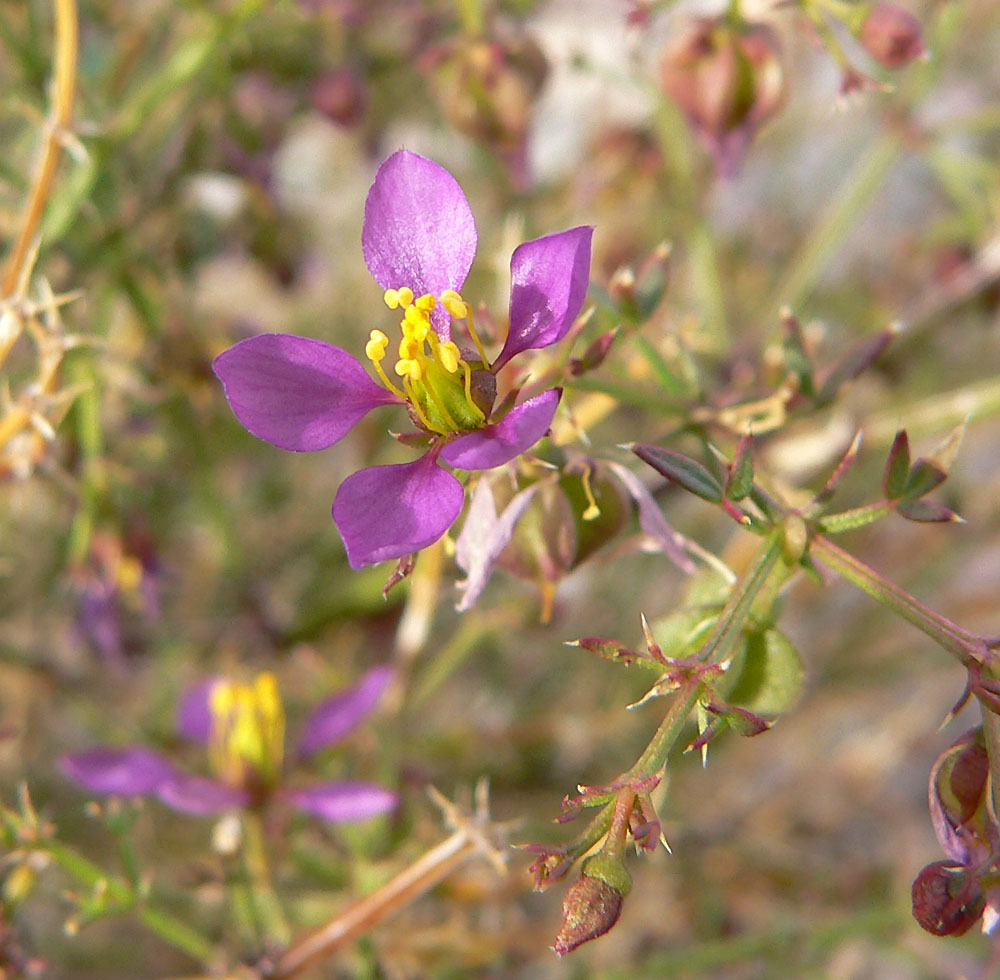

Conservation status
- Apparently Secure (NatureServe)

Scientific classification
- Kingdom: Plantae
- Clade: Tracheophytes
- Clade: Angiosperms
- Clade: Eudicots
- Clade: Rosids
- Order: Zygophyllales
- Family: Zygophyllaceae
- Genus: Fagonia
- Species: F. laevis

Binomial name
- Fagonia laevis Standl.

Synonyms
- Fagonia californica

= Fagonia laevis =

Species of flowering plant

Fagonia laevis, the California fagonbush, is a species of plant in the Zygophyllaceae, the caltrop family. It is a perennial subshrub of the southwestern United States and Northwestern Mexico desert regions in California, southern Nevada, Arizona, southwest Utah, Sonora, Baja California and Baja California Sur. It thrives upon hot, dry, slopes and hillsides that also receive seasonal-(winters of the Southwest) or monsoon moisture.

== Description ==
The California fagonbush is a spreading ground-hugging plant. As a cousin to the creosote bush, it has similar waxy leaves being an adaptation to desert temperatures. Leaves are dark green, to 1/2 in long, narrow and composed of three leaflets. This subshrub is found in the "Creosote Bush scrub community" of plants-(southern Mojave Desert, northwestern and western Sonoran Desert, and 'Baja Peninsula deserts').

The plant is open, and runnery, forms mounds up to 18 inches (5 dm) tall. It is a ground cover upon rocks and hillsides, and can hide the actual surface beneath it.

The flowers are star-shaped, 5-petal, and solitary, some plants showing more than others. They are purple-lavender in color, with white near the center. The plant has opposite leaves, trifoliate with spinescent stipules, a pink corolla and smooth fruits.
