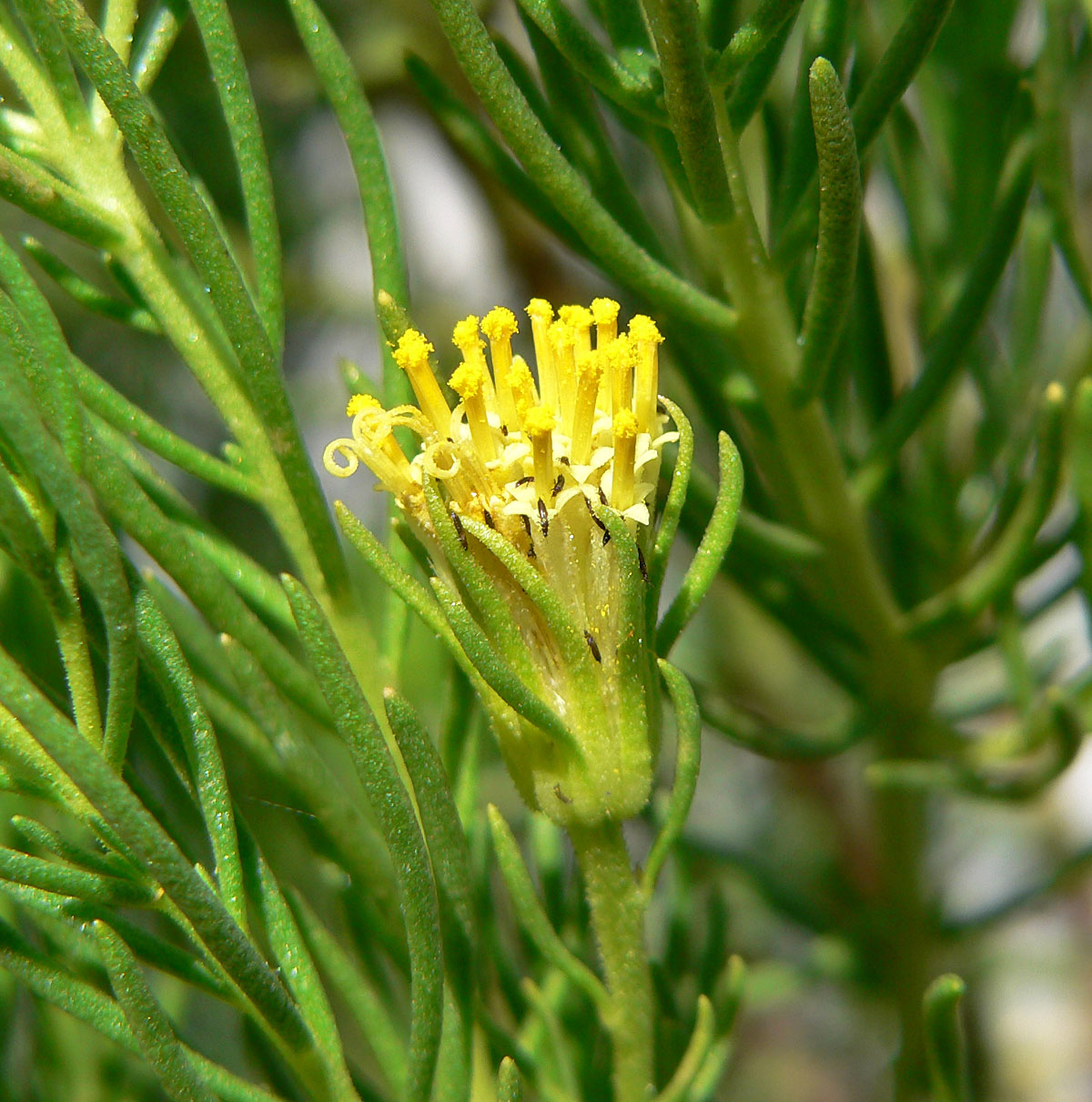

Conservation status
- Secure (NatureServe)

Scientific classification
- Kingdom: Plantae
- Clade: Tracheophytes
- Clade: Angiosperms
- Clade: Eudicots
- Clade: Asterids
- Order: Asterales
- Family: Asteraceae
- Subfamily: Asteroideae
- Tribe: Bahieae
- Genus: Peucephyllum; A.Gray
- Species: P. schottii

Binomial name
- Peucephyllum schottii A.Gray

Synonyms
- Inyonia M.E. Jones

= Peucephyllum =

Genus of flowering plants

Peucephyllum is a monotypic genus of flowering plants containing the single species Peucephyllum schottii. Its common names include pygmy cedar, Schott's pygmy cedar, desert fir, and desert pine. It is not a cedar, fir, or pine, but a member of the aster family, Asteraceae. It is a leafy evergreen shrub with glandular, resinous foliage. It flowers in yellow flower heads which have only disc florets. The fruits are woody, bristly seeds with a pappus. This plant is native to the deserts of Arizona, California, Nevada, and Utah in the United States and Baja California and Sonora in northern Mexico.

The species form is similar to that of the common creosote bush (Larrea tridentata): small, greenish, and hemispherical with similar yellow flowers in the spring.
