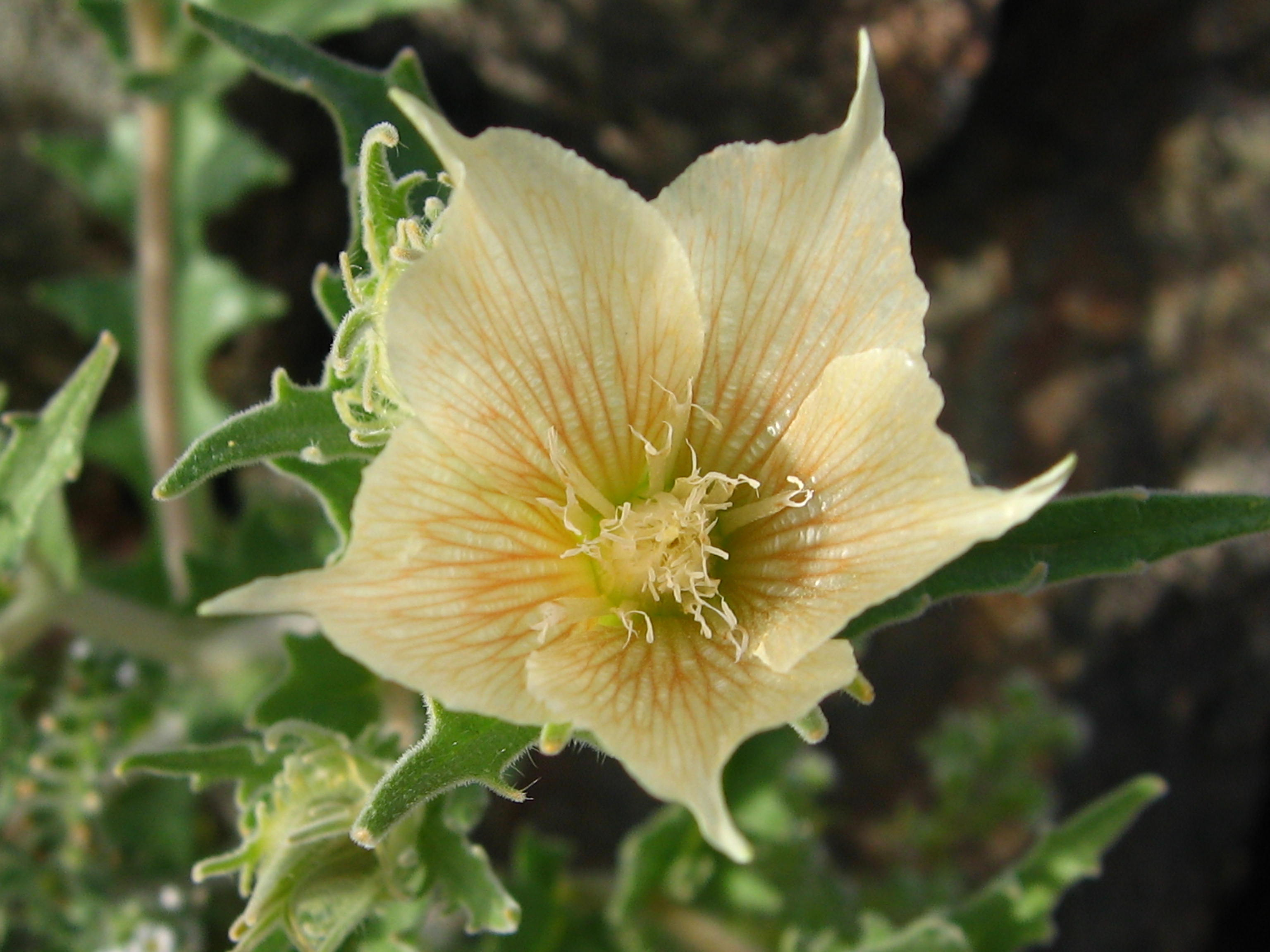

Scientific classification
- Kingdom: Plantae
- Clade: Tracheophytes
- Clade: Angiosperms
- Clade: Eudicots
- Clade: Asterids
- Order: Cornales
- Family: Loasaceae
- Genus: Mentzelia
- Species: M. involucrata

Binomial name
- Mentzelia involucrata S.Watson

= Mentzelia involucrata =

Species of flowering plant

Mentzelia involucrata is a species of Mentzelia native to the Mojave and Sonoran Desert of North America as well as places in Nevada, Arizona and Baja California (Mexico). Its common names include kuʼu, sand blazing star and white-bract blazing star.

== Description ==
Mentzelia involucrata is an annual plant growing to a height of 3–32 cm, with larger leaves forming a basal rosette, and smaller leaves along the stem. The leaves are between 2 and 18 cm long, with an irregularly toothed margin. They are also known to be sessile with leaves that range from lanceolate to elliptic.

The flowers are generally borne singly, and subtended by 4–5 bracts; they have five sepals 7–23 mm long and five cream-yellow petals 13–62 mm long. The fruit is 14–22 mm long and 5–10 mm wide, and contains rough ash-white seeds that are 1–3 cm long. The bracts of this species are distinctive in that they are almost entirely white, with a green border. The involucrata is of interest because it is involved in a competition for pollinators that has resulted in mimicry. It produces nectar to attract bees of the genus Xeralictus. In areas where their range overlaps, Mohavea confertiflora (Ghost Flower), which does not produce nectar, has adapted a morphology resembling Mentzelia involucrata. Recent studies have suggested that in addition to mimicry of M. involucrata, Mohavea confertiflora flowers contain marks that resemble female Xeralictus, to attract male bees that would otherwise ignore the flowers .

The habitat of the Mentzelia involucrata includes open, rocky or sandy places with creosote-bush scrubs, washes, fans, and steep slopes. They are typically found in elevations greater than 50 meters and just below 900 meters.

=== Ethnobotany ===
Mentzelia seeds have been identified as a staple food source for Native American tribes of the Great Basin. In an ethnobotanical study of the Kawaiisu people, Zigmond (1981) noted that Mentzelia (kuʼu) was mentioned whenever his informants were asked to list important foods, and its gathering appeared frequently in mythology.

The seeds were gathered in June after flowers lost their petals, and used immediately or stored. They were parched with hot coals, then ground on a metate; the resulting food had a peanut butter-like consistency. Zigmond also claimed that clay pots were filled with Mentzelia seeds before firing, but others have questioned whether this would be possible without destroying the pots through heat shock.
