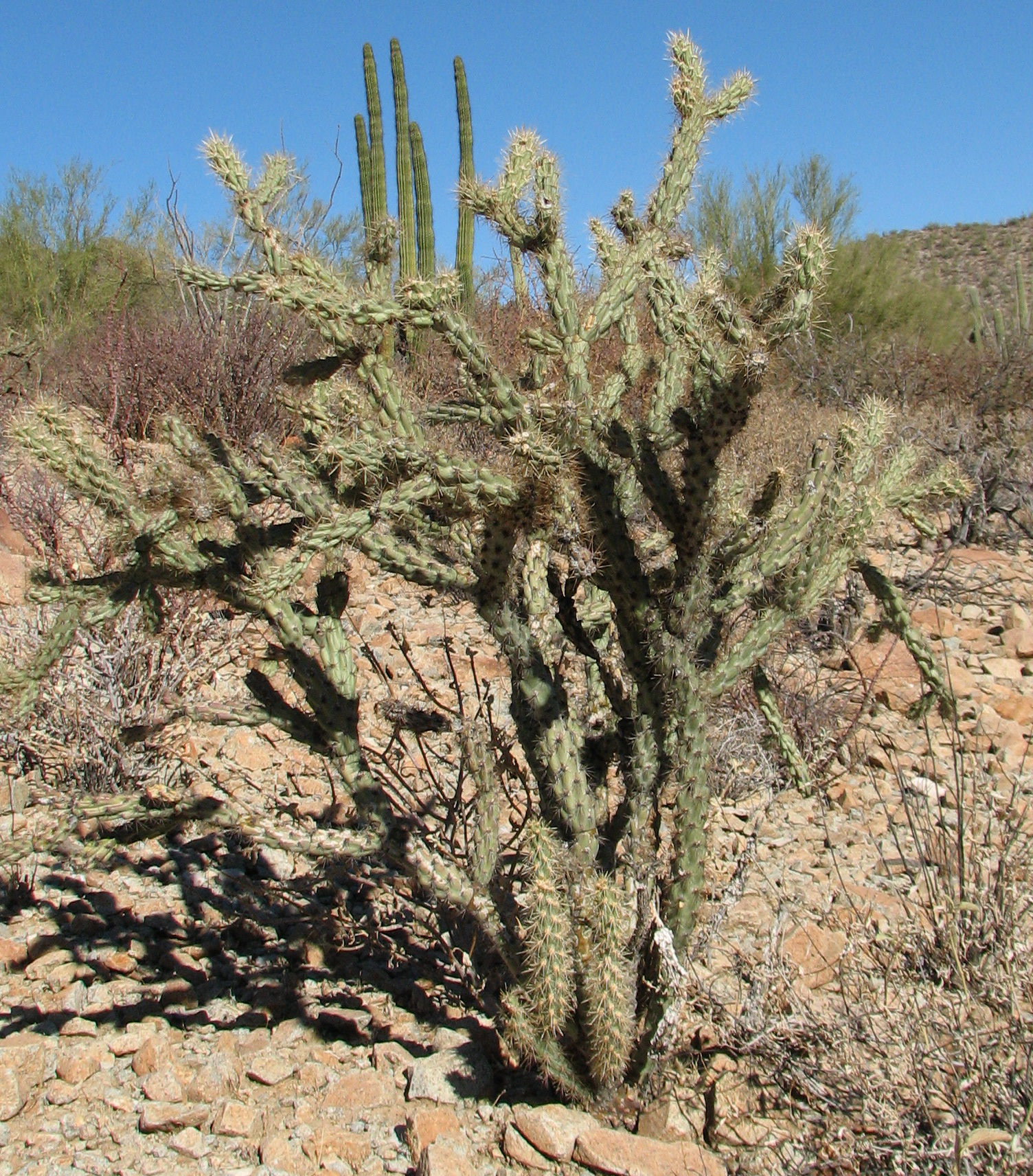

Conservation status
- Least Concern (IUCN 3.1)

Scientific classification
- Kingdom: Plantae
- Clade: Tracheophytes
- Clade: Angiosperms
- Clade: Eudicots
- Order: Caryophyllales
- Family: Cactaceae
- Genus: Cylindropuntia
- Species: C. acanthocarpa

Binomial name
- Cylindropuntia acanthocarpa Engelm. & J.M. Bigelow

Synonyms
- Opuntia acanthocarpa

= Cylindropuntia acanthocarpa =

Species of cactus

Cylindropuntia acanthocarpa, commonly referred to as buckhorn cholla, is a cholla native to the Mojave, Sonoran, and Colorado Deserts of North America. Along with Cylindropuntia bigelovii (the "teddy bear" cholla), it is the most common cholla found in these deserts.

== Varieties ==
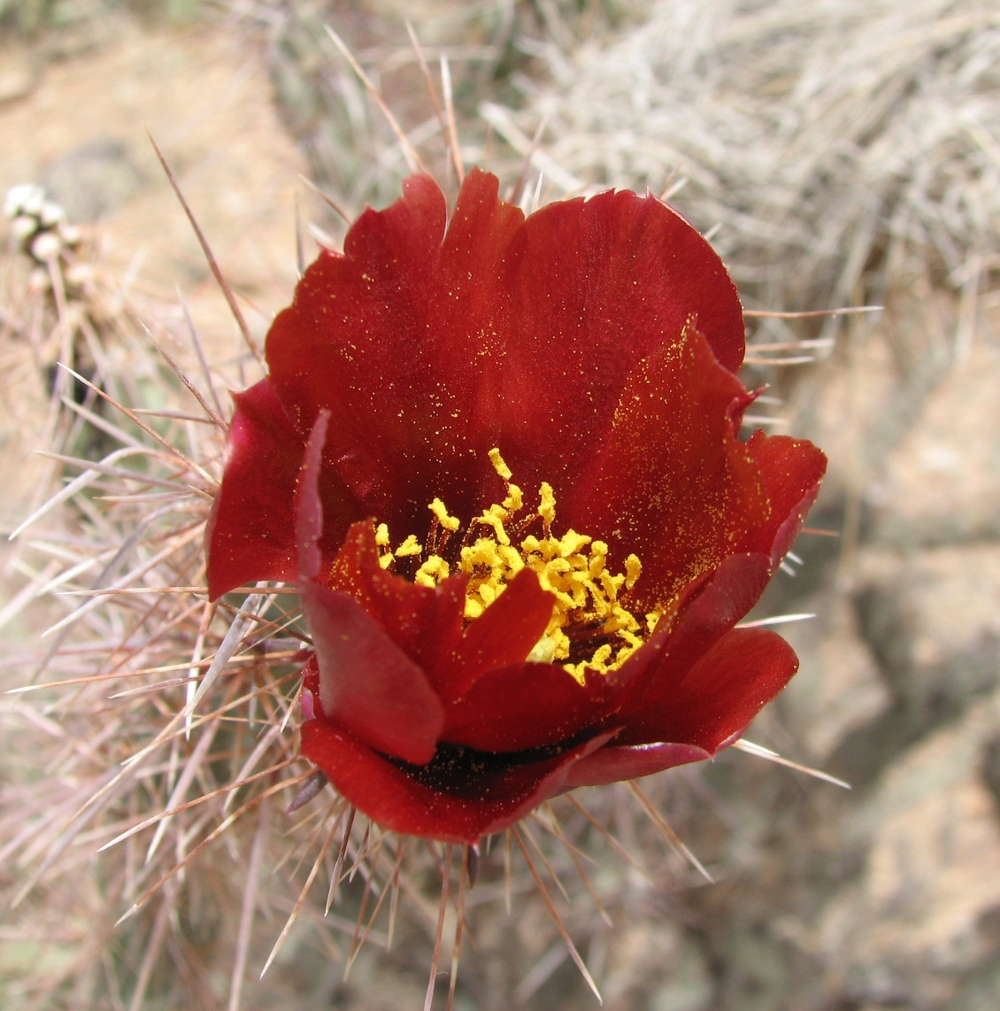
Flower

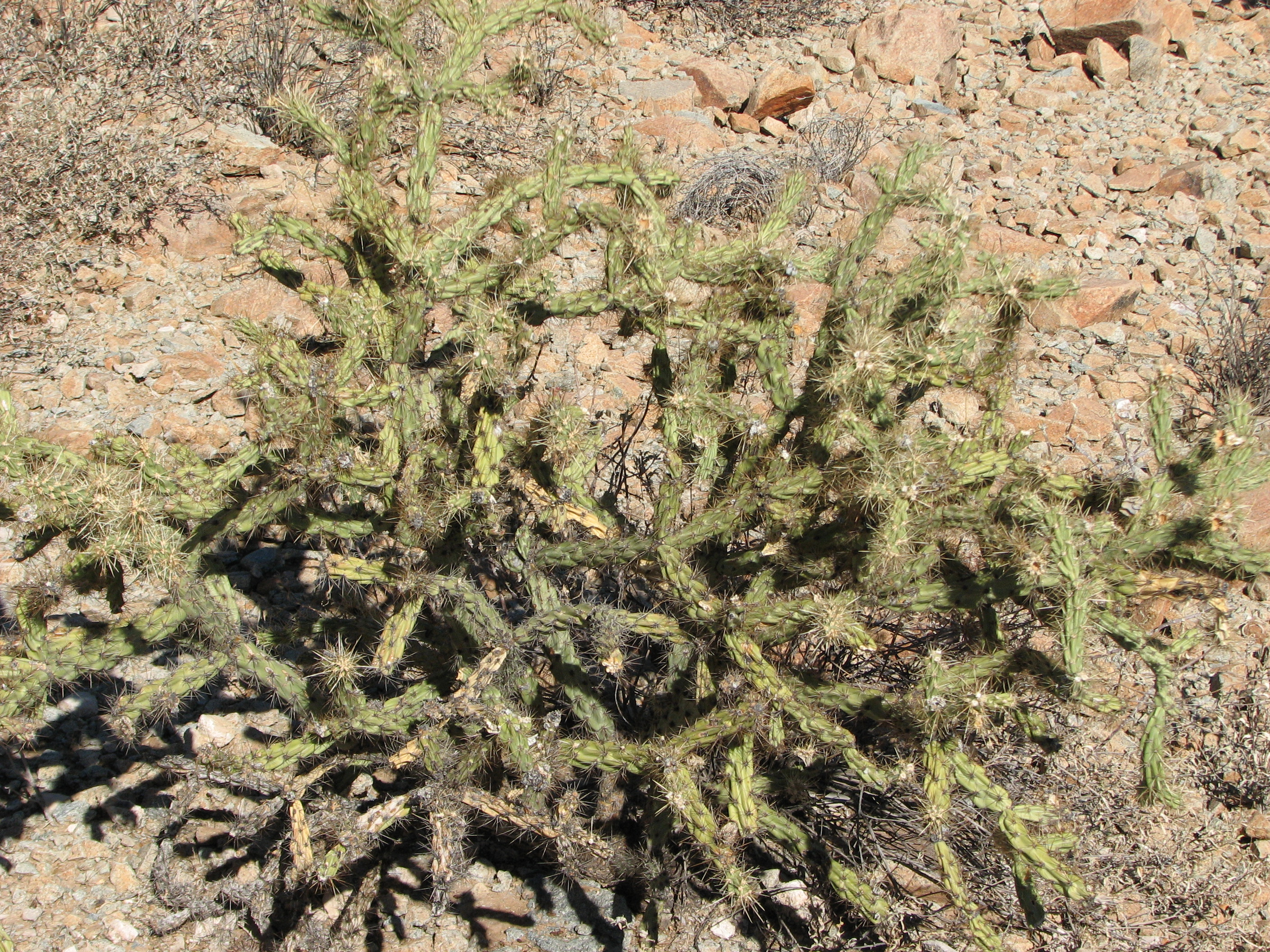
During winter dryness.

There are a number of recognized varieties include:

- Cylindropuntia acanthocarpa var. acanthocarpa
- Cylindropuntia acanthocarpa var. coloradensis — L.D. Benson; Colorado buckhorn cholla.
- Cylindropuntia acanthocarpa var. ganderi — (C.B. Wolf) L.D. Benson
- Cylindropuntia acanthocarpa var. major — Engelm. & J.M. Bigelow
- Cylindropuntia acanthocarpa var. ramosa — Peebles
- Cylindropuntia acanthocarpa var. thornberi — (Thornber & Bonker) L.D. Benson; Thornber's buckhorn cholla.

== Ethnobotany ==
- Early spring was called ko'oak macat (the painful moon) by the Tohono O'odham because of scarce food supplies. During this season, they turned to cacti for food and pit-roasted thousands of calcium-rich cholla flower buds.[1]
- Today's O'odham people still pit-roast or boil the cholla buds, which taste like asparagus tips.
