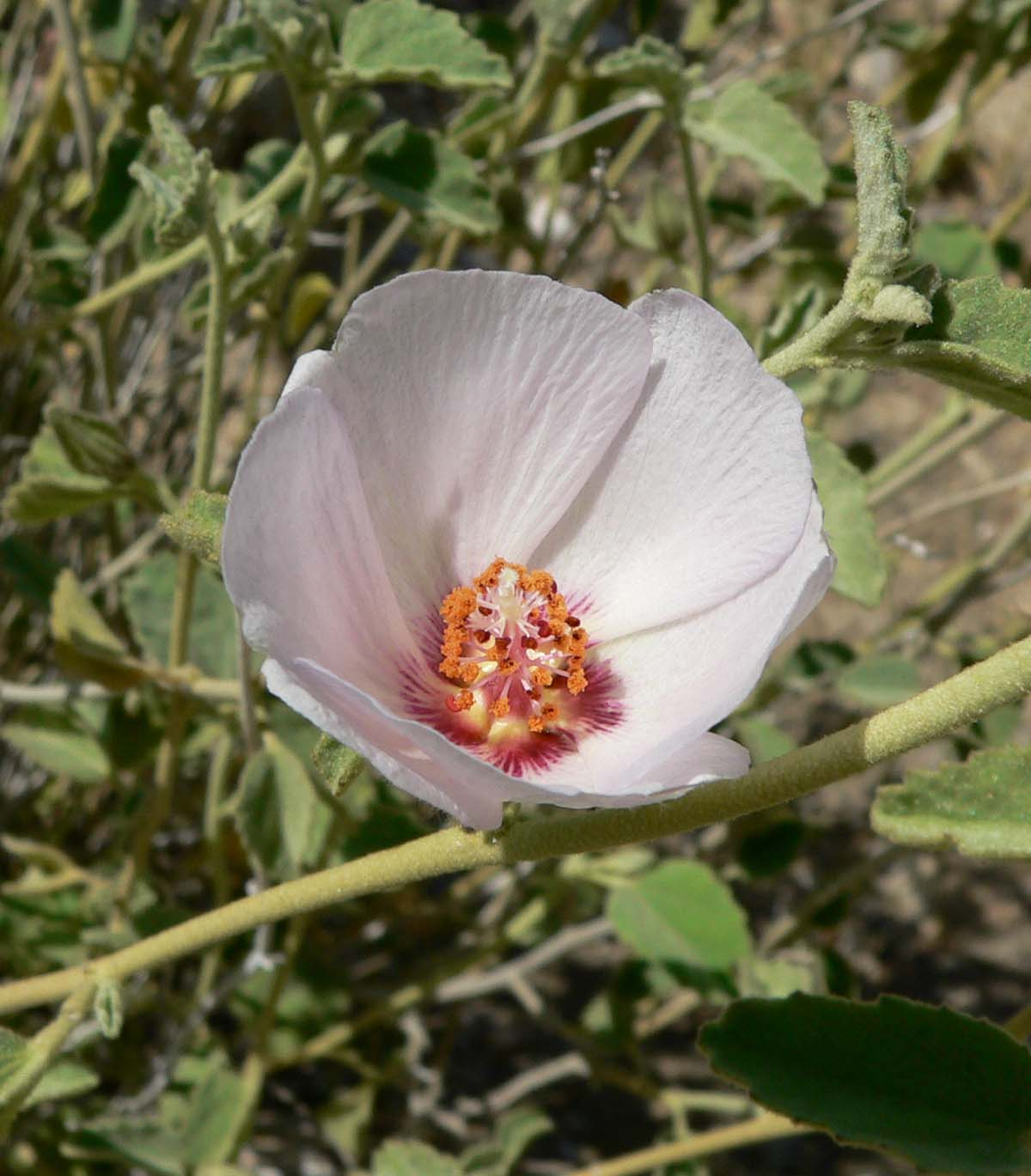

Scientific classification
- Kingdom: Plantae
- Clade: Tracheophytes
- Clade: Angiosperms
- Clade: Eudicots
- Clade: Rosids
- Order: Malvales
- Family: Malvaceae
- Genus: Hibiscus
- Species: H. denudatus

Binomial name
- Hibiscus denudatus Benth.

= Hibiscus denudatus =

Species of flowering plant

Hibiscus denudatus (common names: paleface, rock hibiscus) is a perennial shrub of the mallow family, Malvaceae. It is in the rosemallow genus, Hibiscus.

It is found in the southwest of North America in the southwestern United States and northern Mexico in the states of extreme southeast California, southern Nevada, southern Arizona and New Mexico, southwest Texas, Baja California-north, Sonora, Chihuahua, and Coahuila. It can be found in the Colorado and Sonoran Deserts, and in the east to the Chihuahuan Desert.

In California, Rock Hibiscus is exclusive to the southeast, the Colorado Desert-(northwestern Sonoran Desert) and neighboring Baja California state, Mexico.

== Plant form ==
The form of the plant is somewhat straggly vertical branches reaching 2–4 feet (1.5 m), and not always a wide, full shrub. The leaves are small to 1½ in and about the same in width, and finely toothed. The leaves are a medium yellow green, hairy-surfaced, and elliptical to ovoid in shape.

The flower is a pale white, hence the name paleface, or pale light lavender to light pink. The petals can be rice paper thin, and on some plants nearly translucent; the flower petals are broad and roundish, also overlapping; the entire flower is a broad cup shape. One vertical branch will often have a terminal flower, and axial flowers along the branch. The flowers will bloom depending on seasonal temperatures starting in January to the end of late summer/fall in October.

The plant can be found in desert washes, also rocky slopes, and mesas, up to 2,000 feet (610 m) elevation. In the southwest Arizona deserts in the western Sonoran Desert, it can be found in the desert washes with desert lavender which has a similar color and shaped leaf; the desert lavender often blooms before Rock Hibiscus.

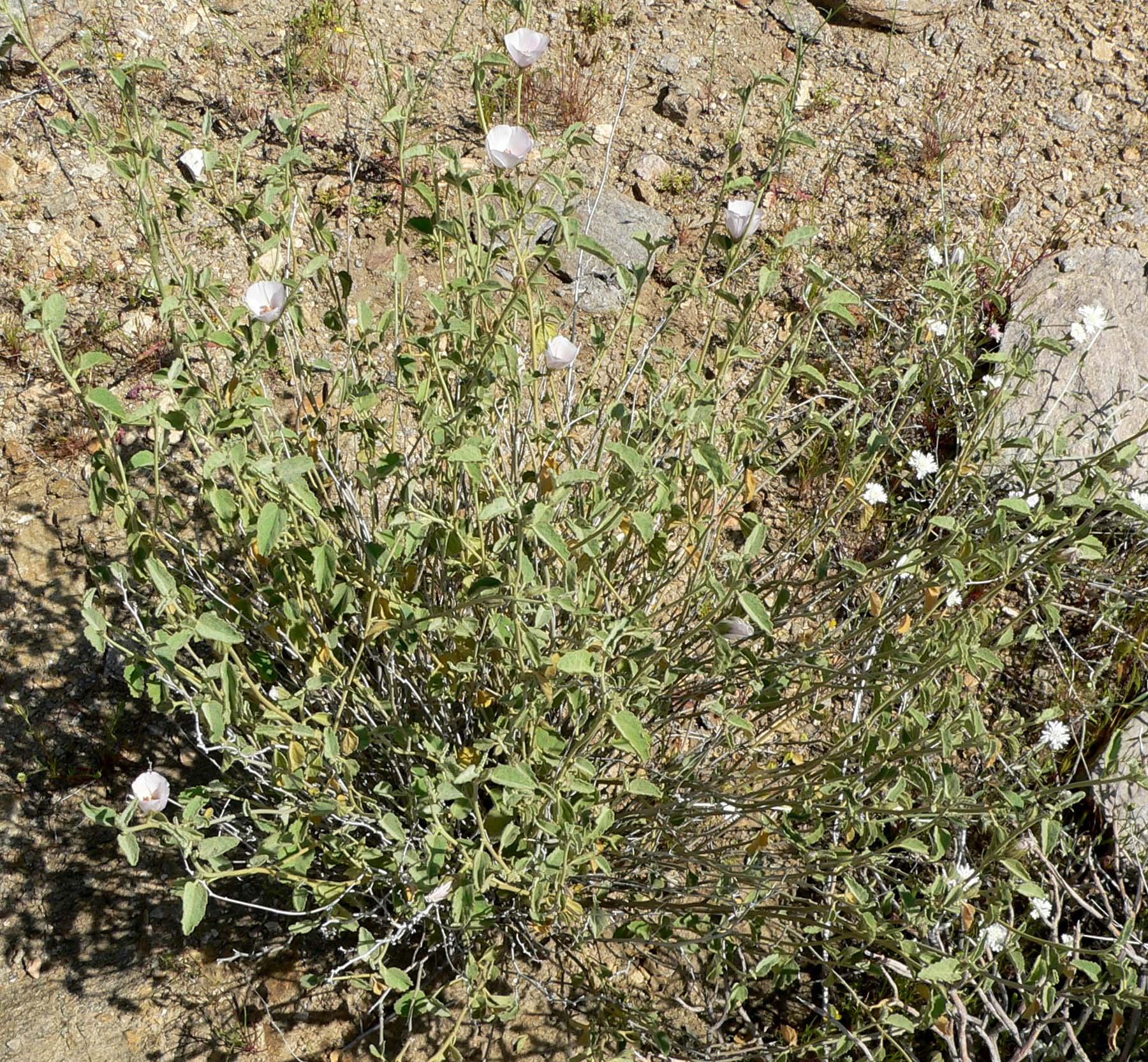

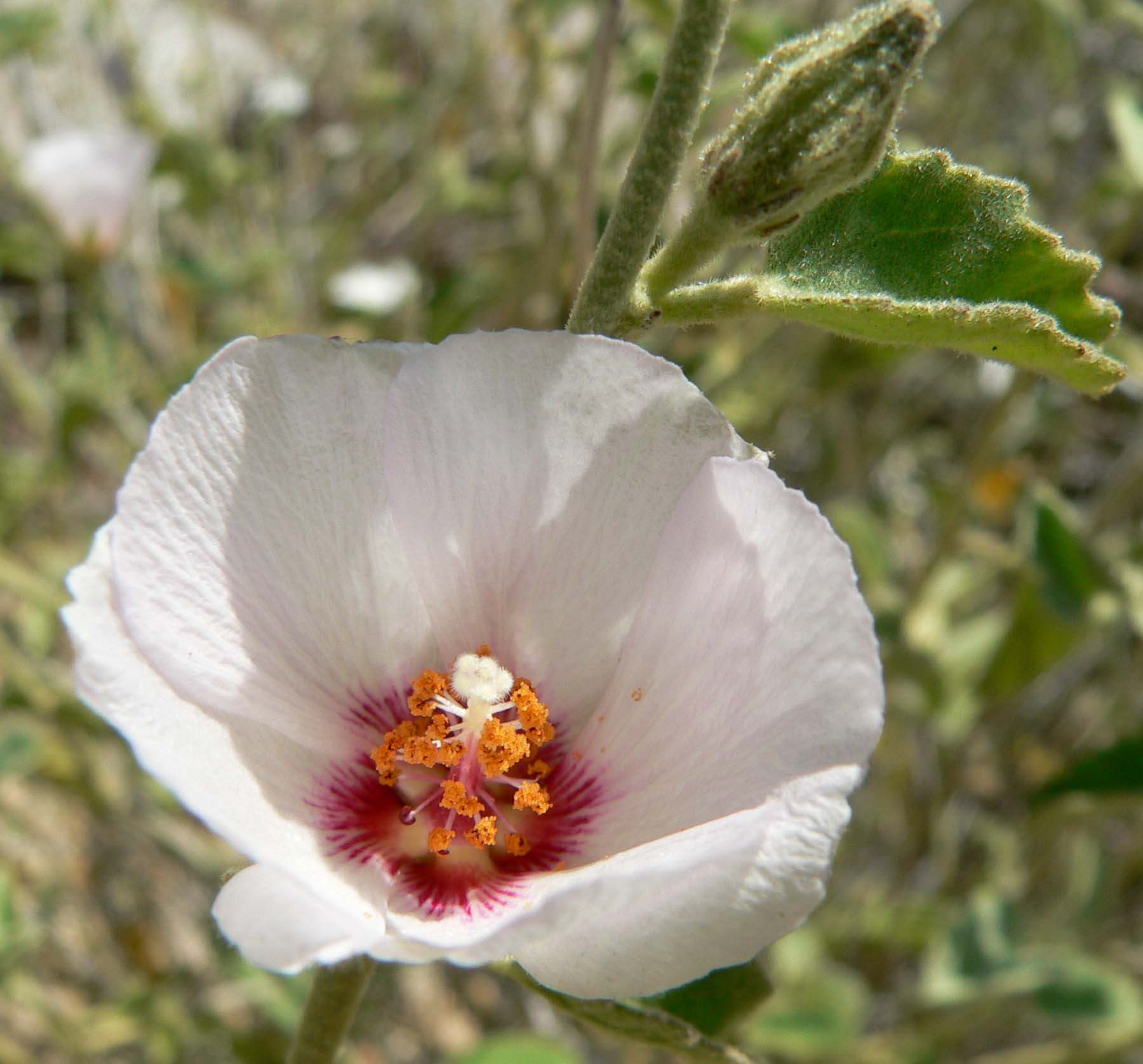

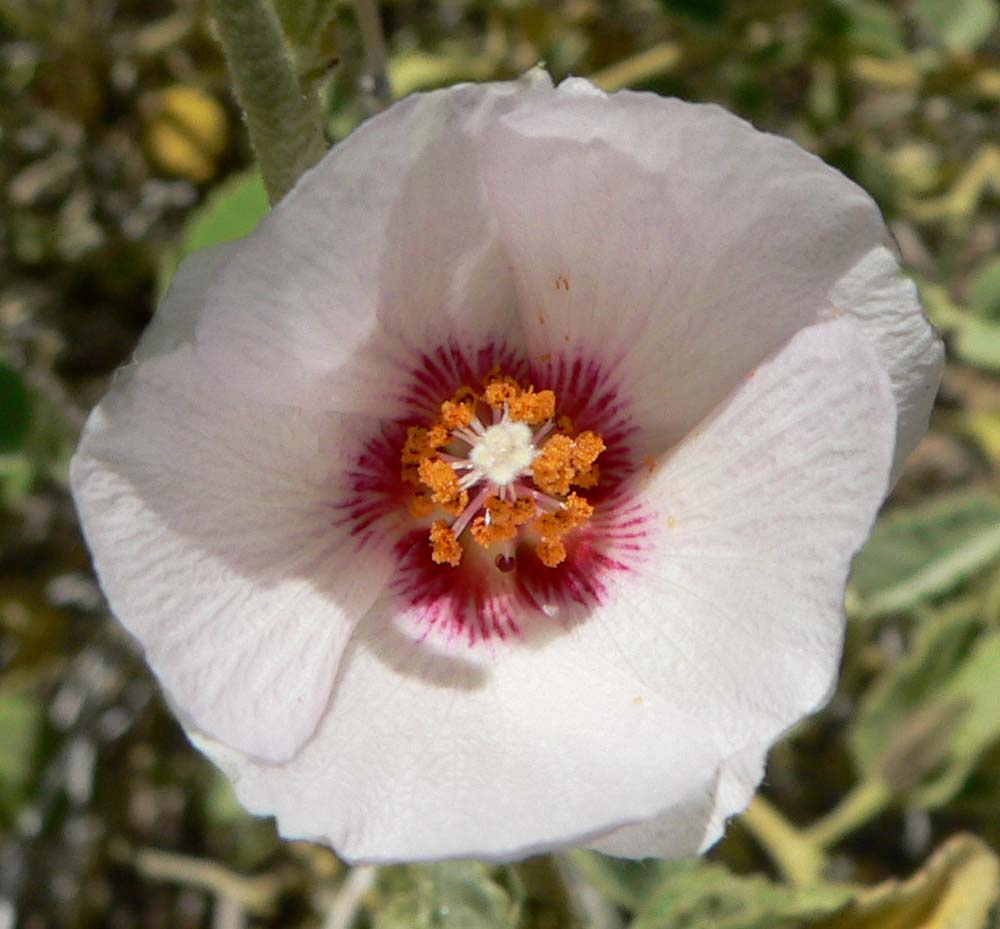
