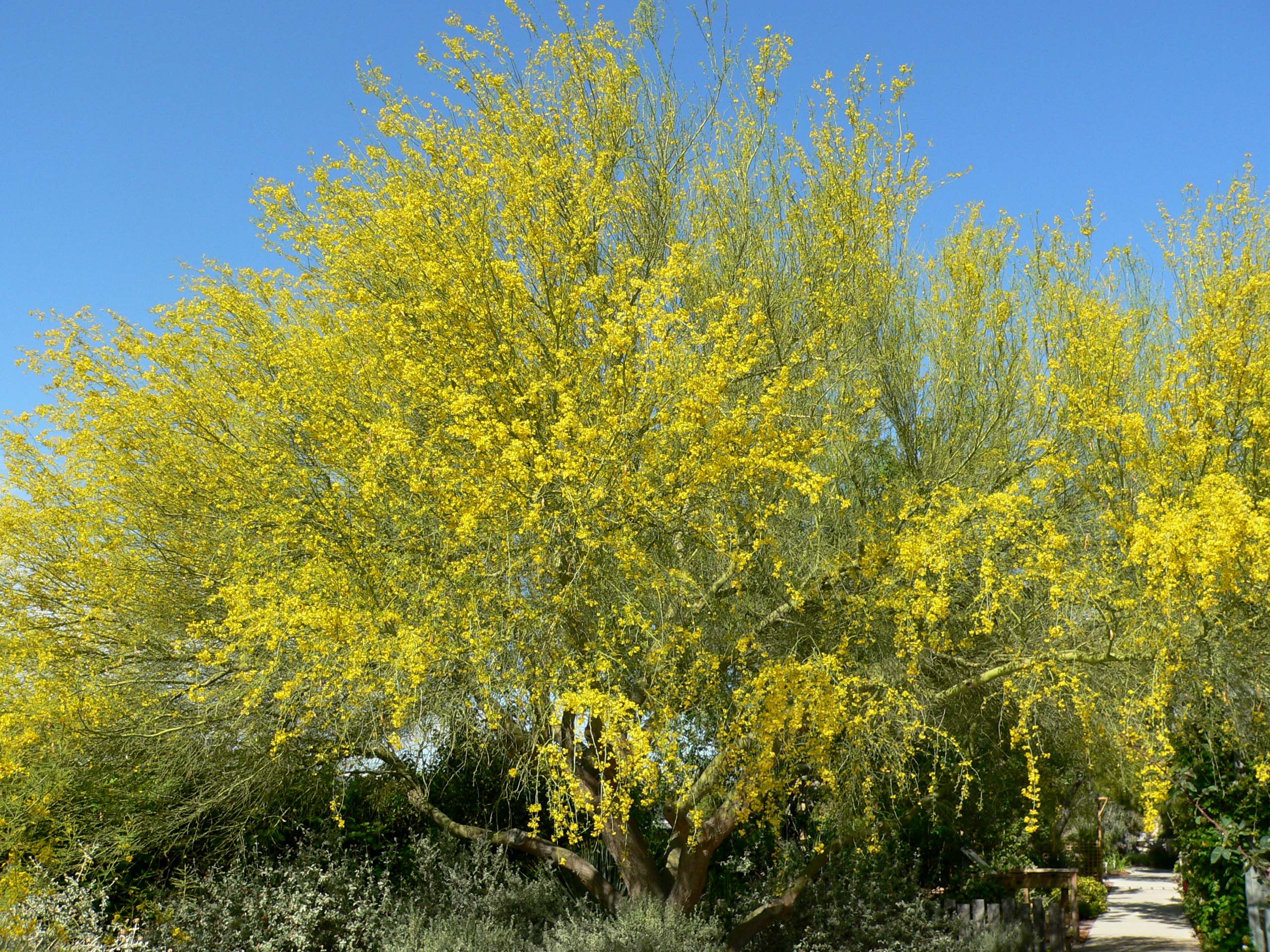
- Tree in flower

Scientific classification
- Kingdom: Plantae
- Clade: Embryophytes
- Clade: Tracheophytes
- Clade: Angiosperms
- Clade: Eudicots
- Clade: Rosids
- Order: Fabales
- Family: Fabaceae
- Subfamily: Caesalpinioideae
- Genus: Parkinsonia
- Species: P. florida

Binomial name
- Parkinsonia florida (Benth. ex A.Gray) S.Wats.

= Parkinsonia florida =

Blue palo verde

Species of tree native to the Sonoran Desert

Parkinsonia florida, the blue palo verde (syn. Cercidium floridum), is a species of palo verde native to the Sonoran Deserts in the Southwestern United States and Northwestern Mexico. Its name means "green tree" in American Spanish, referring to the green foliage, trunk, and branches, that perform photosynthesis

== Description ==
Parkinsonia florida grows to heights of 33–39 feet (10–12 m). It is a rapidly growing large shrub or small tree, and rarely survives to 100 years. Compared to the closely related Parkinsonia microphylla (foothill paloverde), it appears more decumbent in overall form, is taller, and matures more quickly.

The plant's trunk, branches, and leaves are gray-green in color, hence the common name. The plant is drought-deciduous, shedding its foliage for most of the year, leafing out after rainfall. Photosynthesis is performed by the gray-green branches and twigs, regardless of absent leaves.

The flowers are bright yellow, and pea-like, which cover the tree in late spring. They attract pollinators such as bees, beetles, and flies. They are followed by seed pods which are slightly larger and flatter and have harder shells than the foothill paloverde. These are a food source for small rodents and birds.

== Distribution ==
This plant is primarily found in the Sonoran Colorado Desert of southeastern California, and the Sonoran Deserts of southern Arizona and of northwestern Sonora state (Mexico). It is found predominantly in desert washes or bajadas, a result of its need for water, although occasionally it can be found in creosote desert scrub habitat, accessing seeps in desert hills up to 3,600 feet (1,100 m). Also found in the far eastern Mojave Desert of California in the northern Lower Colorado River Valley, and occasionally in the Mojave's mountains.

== Uses ==
=== Native American ===
The plant's beans were used as a food source, and wood for carving ladles, by the indigenous Quechan, Mojave, and Akimel O'odham. The Akimel and Tohono Oʼodham both ate the beans when soft and immature and cooked whole; they also ground the ripe seeds into flour to eat as atole or gruel. The flowers are sweet and edible either fresh or cooked.

=== Cultivation ===
Parkinsonia florida is cultivated as an ornamental plant and tree by specialty plant nurseries, for planting as a shrub or multi-trunked small tree in drought tolerant and wildlife gardens of suitable climates. It offers an unusual green-blue silhouette in gardens, and delicately patterned light shade over patios.

== Taxonomy and symbols ==
The Irish botanist Thomas Coulter was the first to categorize Parkinsonia florida. He obtained specimens near Hermosillo, in Sonora, Mexico, in 1830.

The blue palo verde is the state tree of Arizona. In 1966, it was also named the "city tree" of South Miami, Florida.
