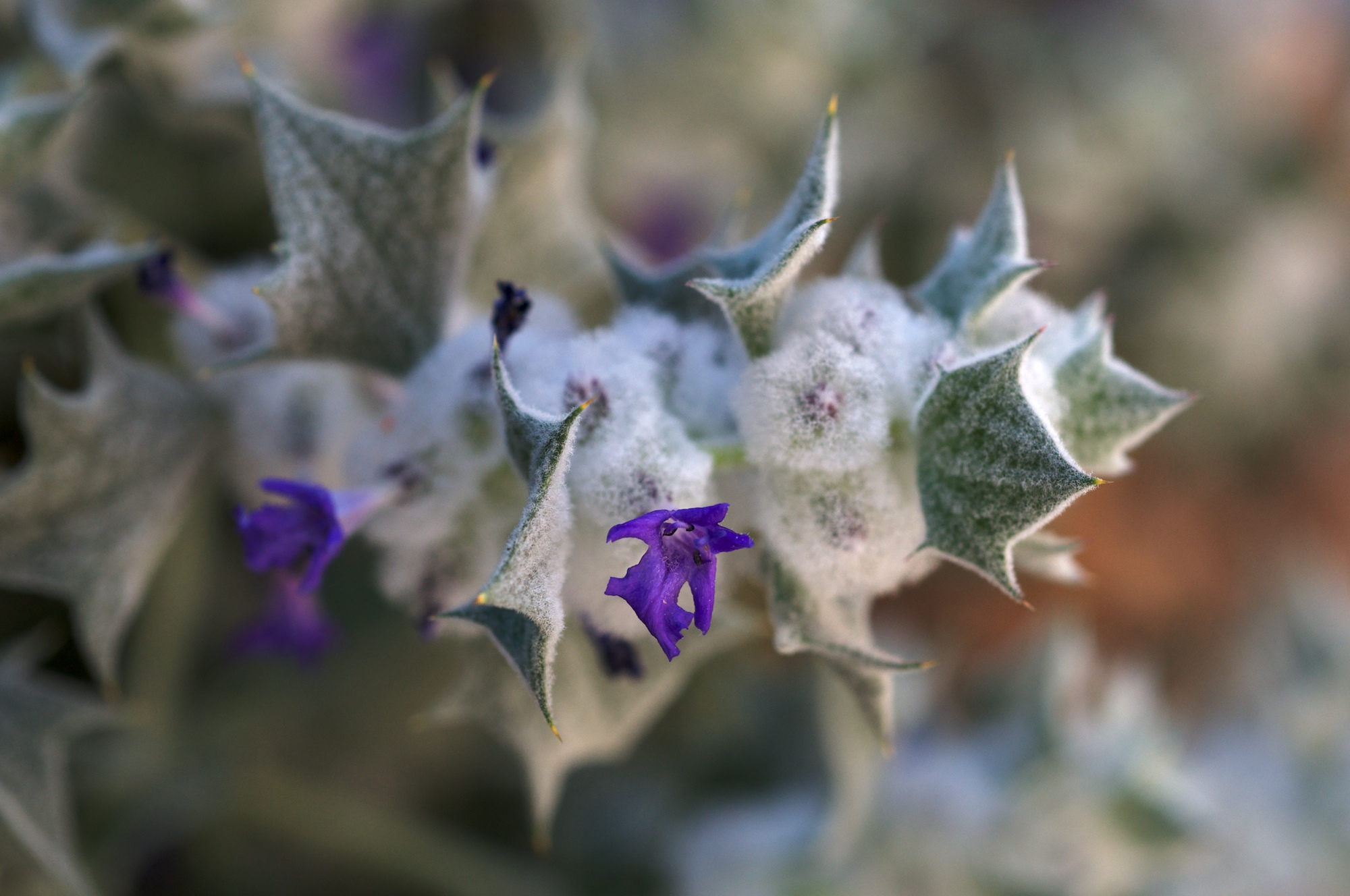
- in Titus Canyon, Death Valley

Scientific classification
- Kingdom: Plantae
- Clade: Embryophytes
- Clade: Tracheophytes
- Clade: Angiosperms
- Clade: Eudicots
- Clade: Asterids
- Order: Lamiales
- Family: Lamiaceae
- Genus: Salvia
- Species: S. funerea

Binomial name
- Salvia funerea M.E.Jones

= Salvia funerea =

Species of shrub

Salvia funerea, is a species of semi-deciduous perennial shrub with the common names Death Valley sage, woolly sage, and funeral sage, is an intricately branched shrub associated with limestone soils in the Mojave Desert in California and Nevada. It is characterized by an overall white appearance due to wooly hairs that cover the stems and leaves.

== Description ==
Salvia funerea is a shrub that may exceed a meter in height. It is densely branched, and the branches are densely covered in white, wooly hairs. The leaves are 9 to 20 mm long, have short petioles, and are generally deciduous. The leaf blade is shaped more or less ovate, with spines at the tip and sometimes on the margins.

There are generally 3 flowers emerging in the axils of the sharply-toothed leaves. The flowers have a calyx 4.5 to 6 mm large, with 5 lobes that are shaped triangular, and tipped with spines. The corolla tube is 12 to 16 mm long, colored violet, with the stamens and style included (not projecting beyond the mouth of the corolla).

== Taxonomy ==
This species was described in 1908 by Marcus E. Jones based on a specimen collected in Inyo County, California. The specific epithet, "funerea", relates to where the plant was first found, in the Funeral Mountains along the California-Nevada border. It is closely related to Salvia greatae.

The chromosome number is 2n=64.

== Distribution ==
The plant can be found in dry alkaline washes with limestone soils and on the limestone cliffs of narrow canyons. It is distributed throughout the western slopes of the Amargosa Range (the Funeral Mountains, Black Mountains, and Granite Mountains), in Titus Canyon in the Grapevine Mountains, and in the northern Panamint Range in Grotto and Mosaic Canyons. Most populations are within Death Valley National Park, in Inyo County, California and Nye County, Nevada.

This species is found in association with Creosote bush scrub (Larrea and Ambrosia), and is often found with Atriplex hymenelytra, Bahiopsis reticulata, Encelia farinosa or Encelia actoni, and Eucnide urens.

== Cultivation ==
This species is regarded as unsuitable for cultivation, due to its need of very restrictive habitat conditions, which are limestone cliffs or alkaline desert washes with limestone soils. Furthermore, collecting the seed from the plant is challenging, with one botanist finding viable seeds for the first time in 15 years in 2026. The plant does not flower every year, and is only found in difficult to reach locations.
