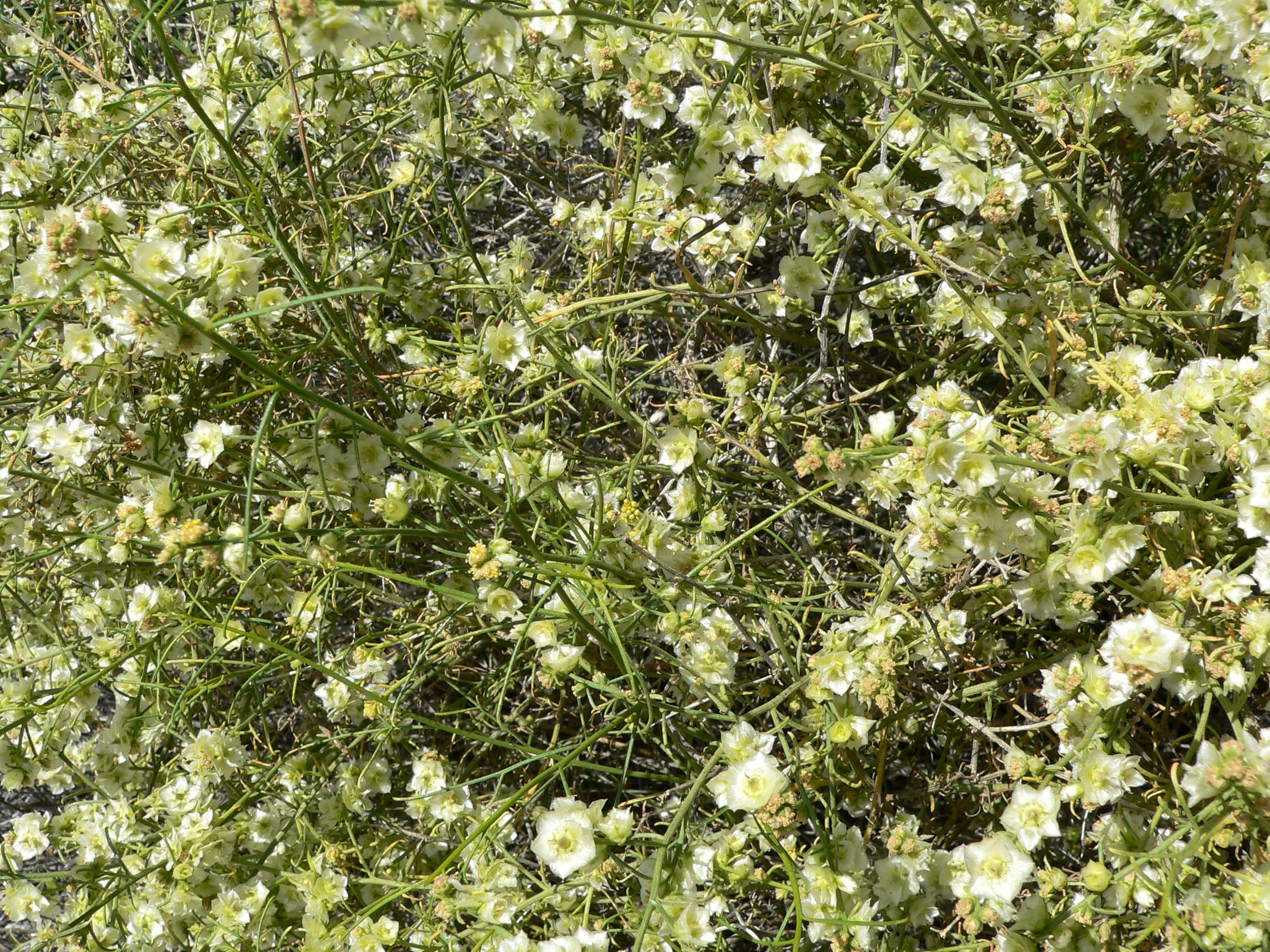

Scientific classification
- Kingdom: Plantae
- Clade: Tracheophytes
- Clade: Angiosperms
- Clade: Eudicots
- Clade: Asterids
- Order: Asterales
- Family: Asteraceae
- Genus: Ambrosia
- Species: A. salsola

Binomial name
- Ambrosia salsola (Torr. & A.Gray) Strother & B.G. Baldwin

Synonyms
- Ambrosia salsola var. fasciculata (A.Nelson) Strother & B.G.Baldwin; Ambrosia salsola var. pentalepis (Rydb.) Strother & B.G.Baldwin; Hymenoclea fasciculata A.Nelson; Hymenoclea pentalepis Rydb.; Hymenoclea salsola'' Torr. & A. Gray; Hymenoclea salsola var. fasciculata (Nelson) K.M.Peterson & W.W.Payne; Hymenoclea salsola var. patula (A.Nelson) K.M.Peterson & W.W.Payne; Hymenoclea salsola var. pentalepis (Rydb.) L.D.Benson

= Ambrosia salsola =

Species of flowering plant

Ambrosia salsola, commonly called cheesebush, winged ragweed, burrobush, white burrobrush, and desert pearl, is a species of perennial shrub in the family Asteraceae native to deserts of the southwestern United States and northwestern Mexico.

This species, notable for its foul smell, easily hybridizes with the white bur-sage (Ambrosia dumosa).

== Range and habitat ==
It is common on sandy desert flats, desert dry washes, and is weedy in disturbed sites in creosote bush scrub, shadscale scrub, Joshua tree woodland, and Pinyon juniper woodland, ranging from Inyo County, California, to northwestern Mexico.

It grows in sandy and gravelly soil, and sometimes on lava formations at elevations of 200–1,800 m (660–5,910 ft).

It is native to the southwestern United States (Arizona, California, Nevada, Utah) and northwestern Mexico (Sonora, Baja California, Baja California Sur), where it is a common plant of the local deserts, where it thrives on sandy soil, alkaline environments, and disturbed sites.

== Growth pattern ==
It is typically 2' to 3' in height. It drops about half of its leaves and some of its twigs in hot, dry summer conditions (drought deciduous).

Ambrosia salsola is a shrub sometimes attaining a height of 150 cm (59 in).

This is a perennial shrub which forms a sprawling bush up to eight feet high.

== Leaves and stems ==
It has thin stems and narrow, needlelike leaves. Leaves are narrow and needlelike (linear), thread-like (filiform), sometimes up to 65 mm (2.6 in) long but a mere 1.5 mm (0.059 in) across.

The foliage and stem tips have a foul, pungent, cheese-like scent when crushed, a trait which gives the plant the common name "cheesebush".

== Inflorescence, fruits, seeds ==
It flowers from March to June. Numerous small, cuplike male flowers grow in spike-like clusters above the female heads growing in the leaf axils.

All female (Pistillate) flower heads contain only one flower, while all male (staminate) heads may contain 5–15 flowers.

It is covered in plentiful white or yellow flowers and then pearly, winged fruits in white, yellow, or pink.
