= Acmaeodera acuta =

Scientific classification
- Kingdom: Animalia
- Phylum: Arthropoda
- Clade: Pancrustacea
- Class: Insecta
- Order: Coleoptera
- Suborder: Polyphaga
- Infraorder: Elateriformia
- Family: Buprestidae
- Genus: Acmaeodera
- Species: A. acuta

Binomial name
- Acmaeodera acuta LeConte, 1860

Species of beetle

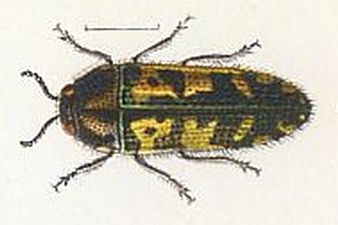
Acmaeodera acuta

Acmaeodera acuta is a species of metallic wood-boring beetle in the family Buprestidae. It is found in the western United States and Mexico. Its larval host is likely Salix and adults hosts include Achillea, Encelia, Rosa, Salix, and Sphaeralcea. The species is fairly restricted to riparian habitats.

A. acuta is often confused with A. retifera in collections.
