= Creosote bush scrub =

North American desert vegetation type

Creosote bush scrub is a North American desert vegetation type (or biome) of sparsely but evenly spaced desert plants dominated by creosote bush (Larrea tridentata) and its associates. Its visual characterization is of widely spaced shrubs that are somewhat evenly distributed over flat or relatively flat desert areas that receive between 2 and 8 inches of rain each year. It covers the majority of the flat desert floor and relatively flat alluvial fans in the Mojave Desert, Chihuahuan Desert, and Sonoran Desert. The dominant plants that typify this vegetation type are creosote bush (Larrea tridentata) and its associates, white bur-sage (Ambrosia dumosa), brittlebush (Encelia farinosa, Encelia actoni, Encelia virginensis), cheese-bush (Ambrosia salsola), Mojave yucca (Yucca schidigera), silver cholla cactus (Cylindropuntia echinocarpa), and beavertail cactus (Opuntia basilaris). Creosote bush has a wider range than its associates, so codominant shrubs, which are associated with more narrow ranges, will vary from region to region.

The bush scrub ecosystems are notable for its persistence under extreme environmental conditions, specifically very high temperatures, low precipitation, and low-nutrient soils. The dominant creosote bush (Larrea tridentata) exhibits many adaptations that improves survival in the harsh conditions. First, it has small, waxy leaves that increase water retention. To complement the leaves, the scrubs produce extensive root systems that enable access to scarce soil moisture that is present. The bush produces a root system with many secondary roots stemming from a taproot, with each secondary root around 10 meters long. Next, the bush produces chemical compounds that inhibit growth of neighboring plants, thus allowing for the creosote bush to obtain a larger portion of the sparse resources in the area. This is a concept known as allelopathy, and it explains why the bushes are evenly distributed throughout the landscape, as if in a grid. Also, the creosote bush typically blooms in the spring, peaking around the month of May. The blooms typically coincide with any time of rainfall.

The creosote bush scrub supports numerous wildlife also adapted to the harsh conditions. Typical inhabitants include desert iguanas, kangaroo rats, and a variety of birds and insects. For many, they act as shelter, with their dense structure shading organisms from the harsh desert sun. Lizards are seen scampering between the branches and birds are frequently using the bushes as shade or a nest. Plus, many insects feed on the bush flowers.

The soils in the scrub ecosystem play a major role in plant distribution and the function of the ecosystem. The deserts have soils that are dry and coarse, with low nutrient availability and organic matter. Notably, in the presence of scrub species like the Larrea tridentata, "fertile islands" are seen to arise. These islands are where the soil below the scrub has increased richness of organic matter, water, microbial activity, etc. compared to other areas of the ecosystem. This is developed as wind and water transfers particles to the shrubs' base, as well as animals having their waste concentrated in the soil near the scrubs.
