= Button brittlebush =

Button brittlebush may refer to one of the following flowering plants:

- Encelia frutescens
- Encelia resinifera subsp. resinifera
