= E. densifolia =

E. densifolia may refer to:

- Encelia densifolia, a desert plant
- Epipactis densifolia, a terrestrial orchid
- Euphorbia densifolia, a flowering plant
- Eutaxia densifolia, a shrub endemic to Western Australia
