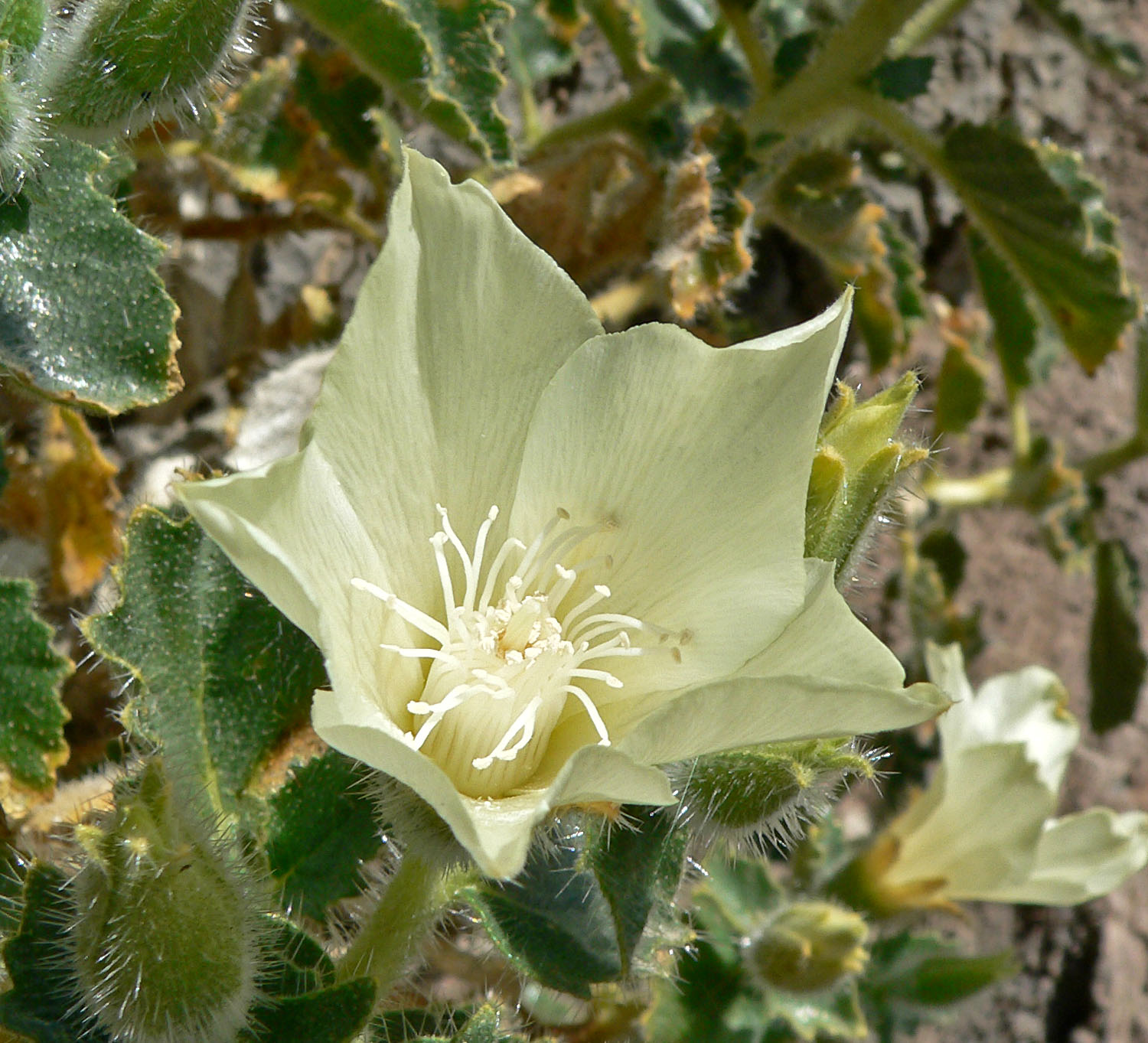
- Eucnide urens

Scientific classification
- Kingdom: Plantae
- Clade: Tracheophytes
- Clade: Angiosperms
- Clade: Eudicots
- Clade: Asterids
- Order: Cornales
- Family: Loasaceae
- Genus: Eucnide; Zucc.

Species
- See text.

= Eucnide =

Genus of flowering plants

Eucnide (stingbush) is a genus of plants in the family Loasaceae.

Species include:

- Eucnide aurea (A. Gray) H.J. Thomps. & W.R. Ernst
- Eucnide bartonioides Zucc. - Yellow stingbush
- Eucnide rupestris (Baill.) H.J. Thompson & Ernst - Rock nettle, rock stingbush
- Eucnide urens (Parry ex Gray) Parry - Desert rock nettle, desert stingbush, stingbush
