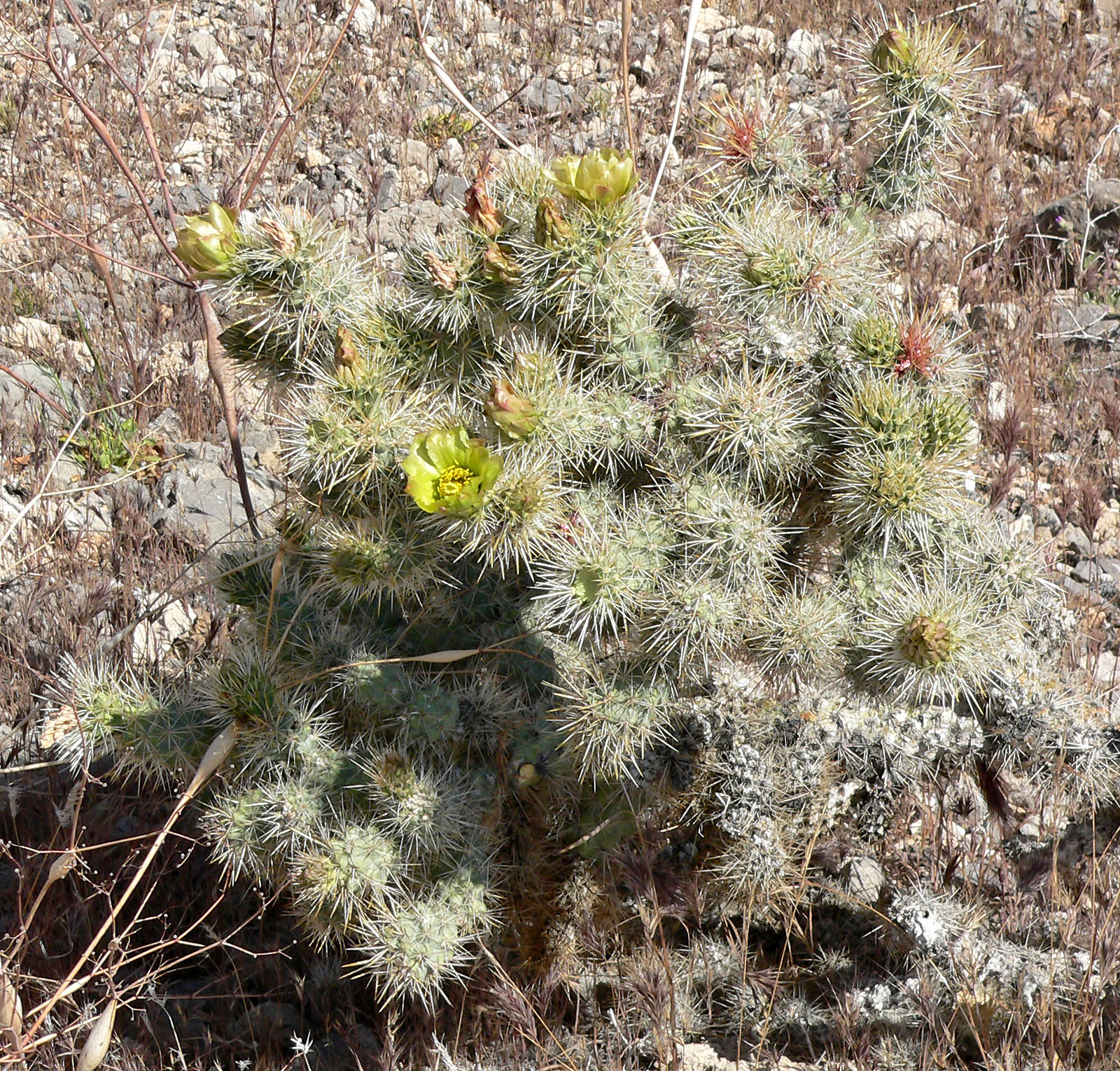

Conservation status
- Least Concern (IUCN 3.1)

Scientific classification
- Kingdom: Plantae
- Clade: Tracheophytes
- Clade: Angiosperms
- Clade: Eudicots
- Order: Caryophyllales
- Family: Cactaceae
- Genus: Cylindropuntia
- Species: C. echinocarpa

Binomial name
- Cylindropuntia echinocarpa (Engelm. & Bigelow) F.M.Knuth

Synonyms
- Opuntia echinocarpa — Engelm. & Bigelow; Opuntia wigginsii

= Cylindropuntia echinocarpa =

Species of cactus

Cylindropuntia echinocarpa is a species of cactus known by the common names silver cholla, golden cholla, and Wiggins' cholla. It was formerly named Opuntia echinocarpa.

== Description ==
Silver cholla is a large, shrub to tree-like cactus which may exceed 0.5 to 2 m (1.6 to 6.6 ft) in height. Its stems and branches are made up of cylindrical green tubercles (segments) up to 1.5 cm wide and just under 1.0 cm tall. The elliptical white or yellow areoles turn gray and bear conspicuous yellow glochids that are 3 to 4 millimeters long. The 6 to 22 spines are present on almost all areoles. The fleshy tubercles each bear up to 20 long, straight, grayish or yellowish spines which may be nearly 4 cm long. The width of the tubercles is less than twice the length, which helps to distinguish it from buckhorn cholla (Cylindropuntia acanthocarpa), which occurs in a similar geographical distribution. The thorns interlock and cover the shoots. They are erect to spreading, white to brown, sometimes darker, and are 2.5 to 5 centimeters long. Bristle-like thorns are also often present. The sheaths of the thorns are white at their base and golden yellow above.

The flowers are usually greenish yellow, sometimes pinkish or brownish in color. The fruit is lumpy, spiny, and tan in color, with white seeds and a foul scent, reminiscent of rancid butter. It measures up to 2 to 2.3 centimeters long. Very few fruits reach maturity, and many immature fruits can often be seen lying on the ground below. This plant reproduces mainly through seeds, but its tubercles may break off and have a chance of producing new plants through asexual reproduction.

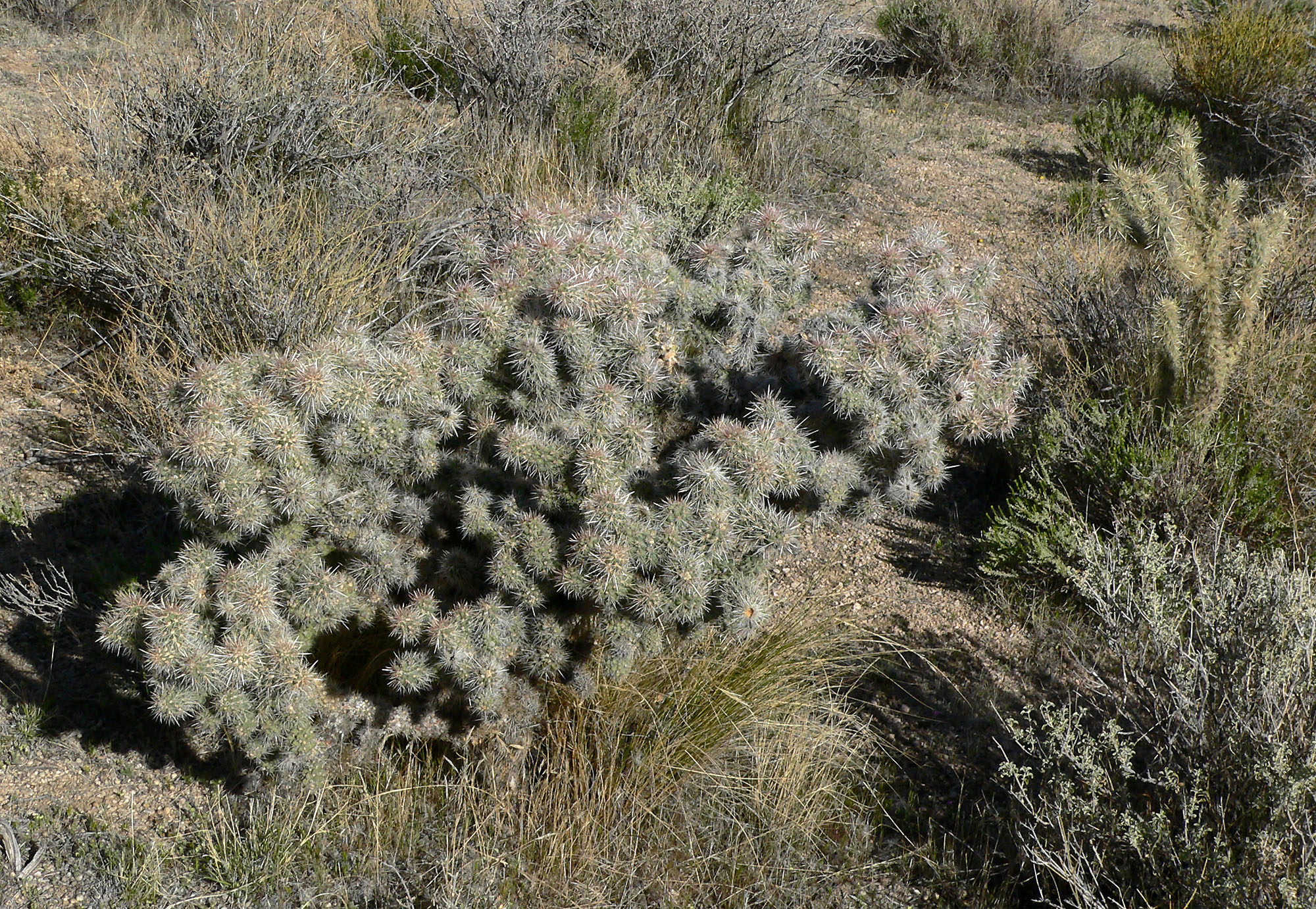
Plant

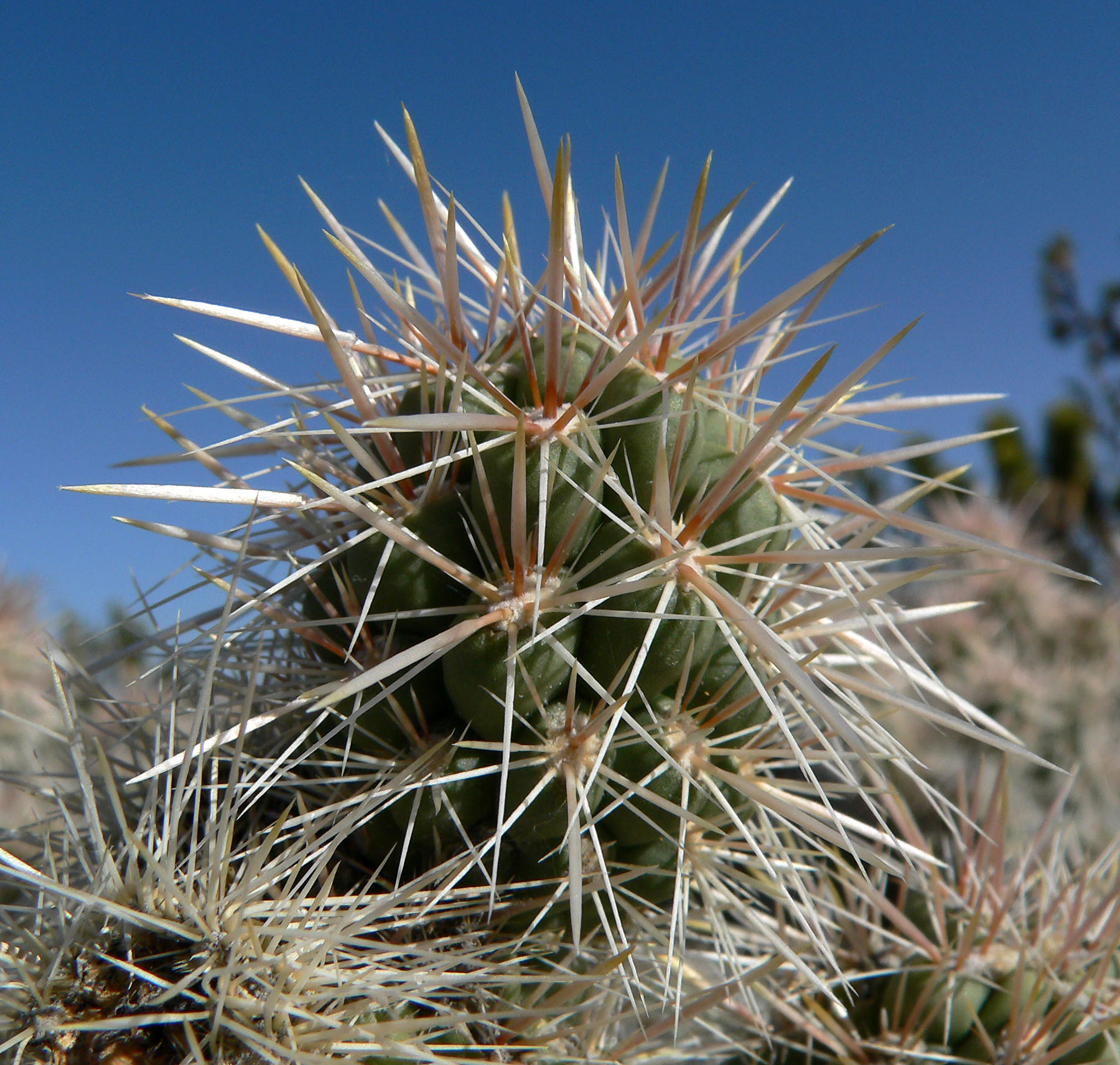
Spines closeup

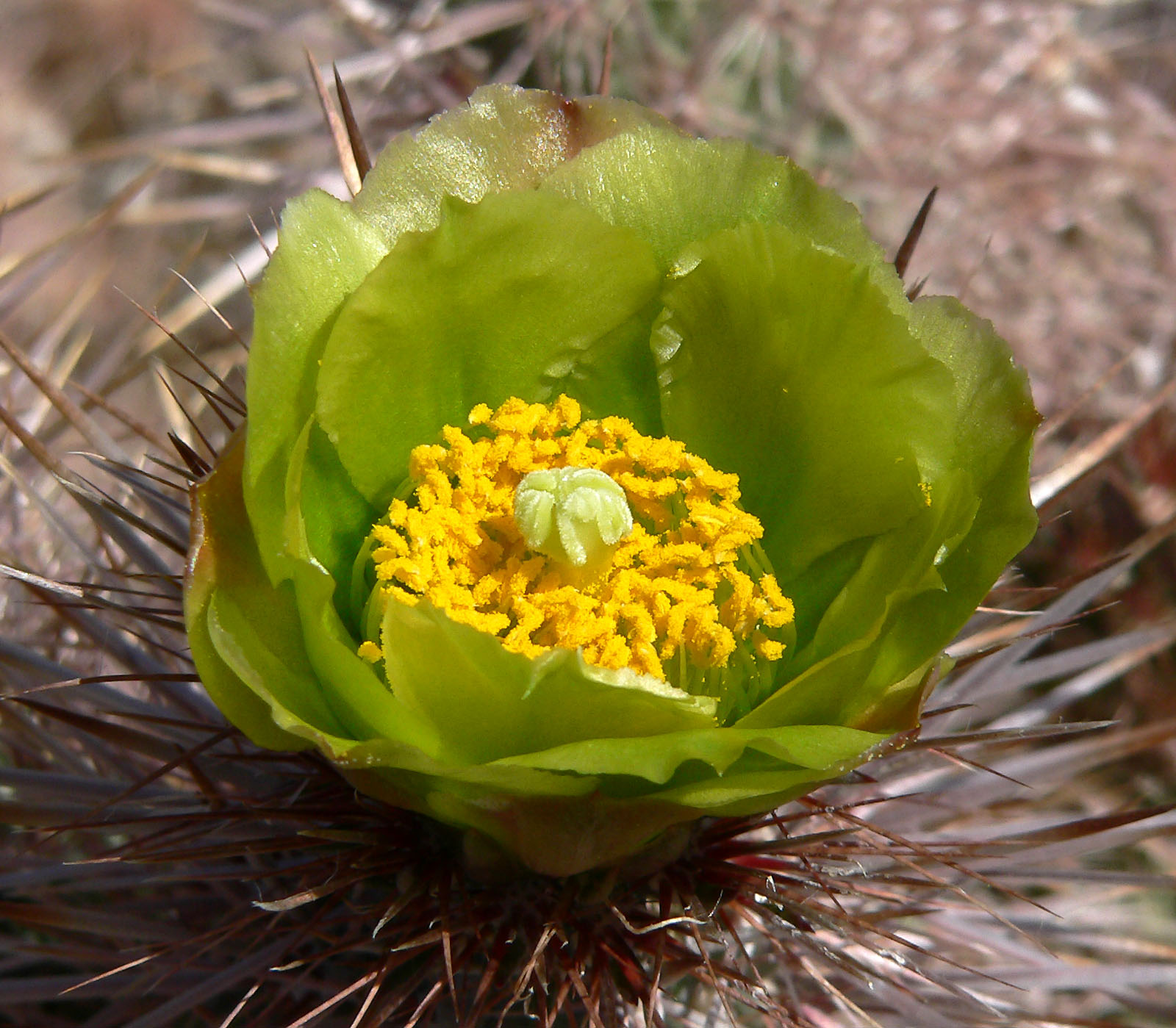
Flower

== Distribution and habitat ==
Cylindropuntia echinocarpa is native to the Southwestern United States and Northwestern Mexico in the states of Baja California and Sonora, where it can be found the Sonoran Desert, the Mojave Desert, and Colorado Desert in California, Nevada, Utah, and Arizona in semi-desert, grassland and forestland at altitudes of 50 to 1700 meters.

It commonly occurs in desert dry wash, creosote bush scrub, Joshua tree woodland, and pinyon-juniper woodland communities. It ranges from Mono County to Baja California Peninsula.

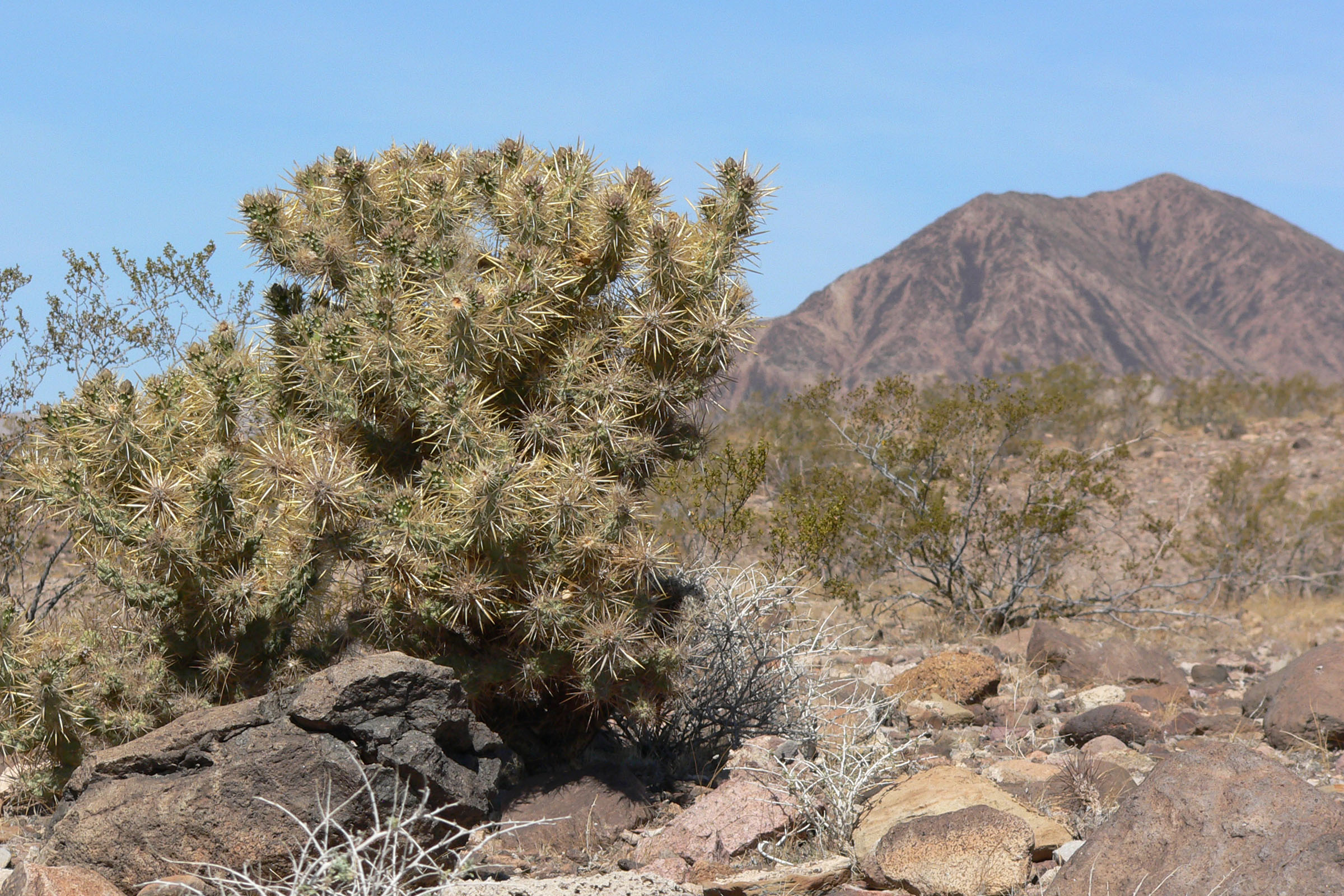
Plant in habitat in southern Nevada

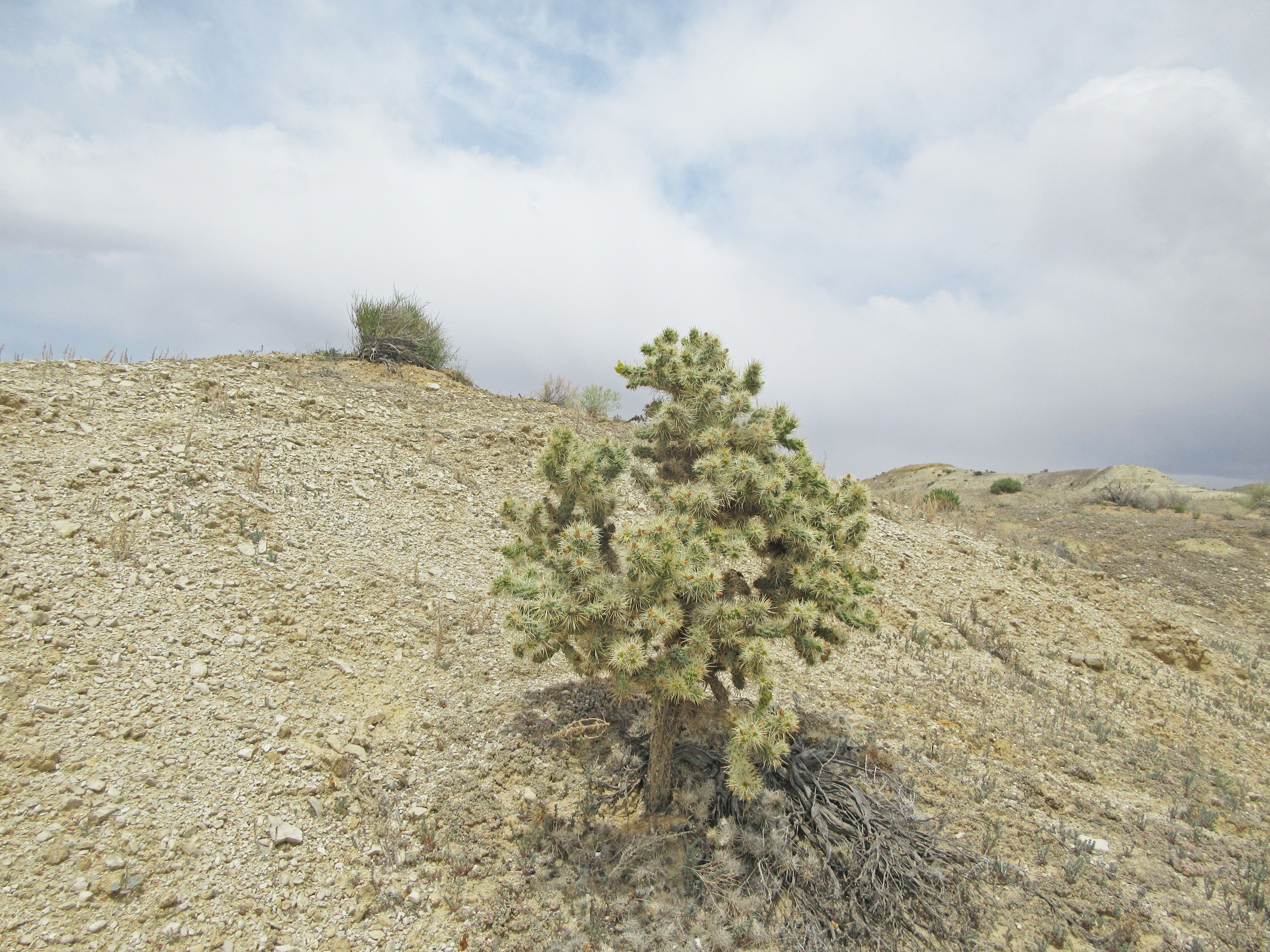
Plant growing in White Dome Nature Preserve, Utah.

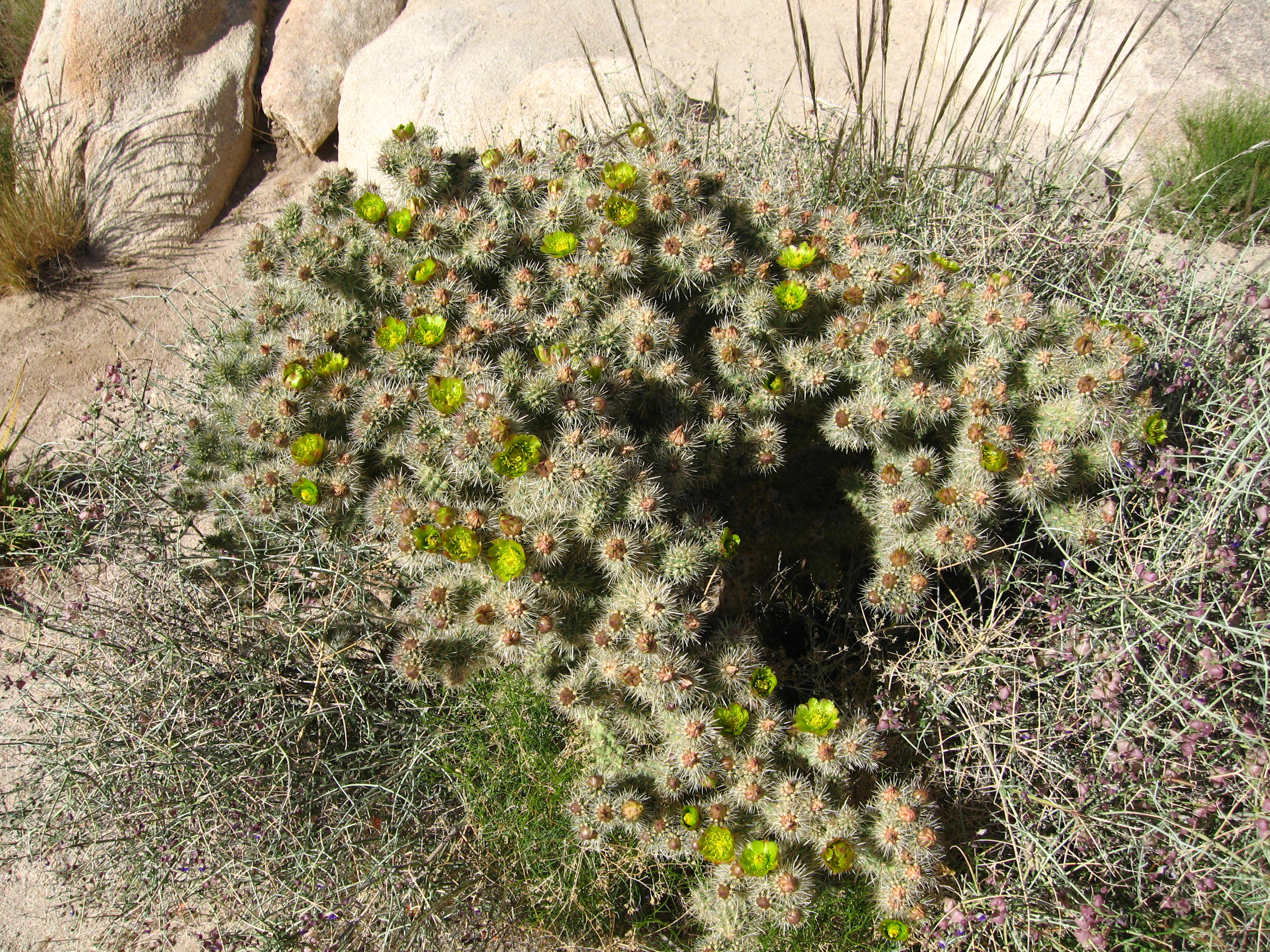
Plant growing in habitat in Joshua Tree National Park

== Taxonomy ==
The first description as Opuntia echinocarpa by George Engelmann and John Milton Bigelow was published in 1856. Frederik Marcus Knuth placed the species in the genus Cylindropuntia in 1936. Further nomenclature synonyms are Cactus echinocarpus (Engelm. & J.M.Bigelow) Lem. (1868) and Grusonia echinocarpa (Engelm. & J.M.Bigelow) G.D.Rowley (2006).
