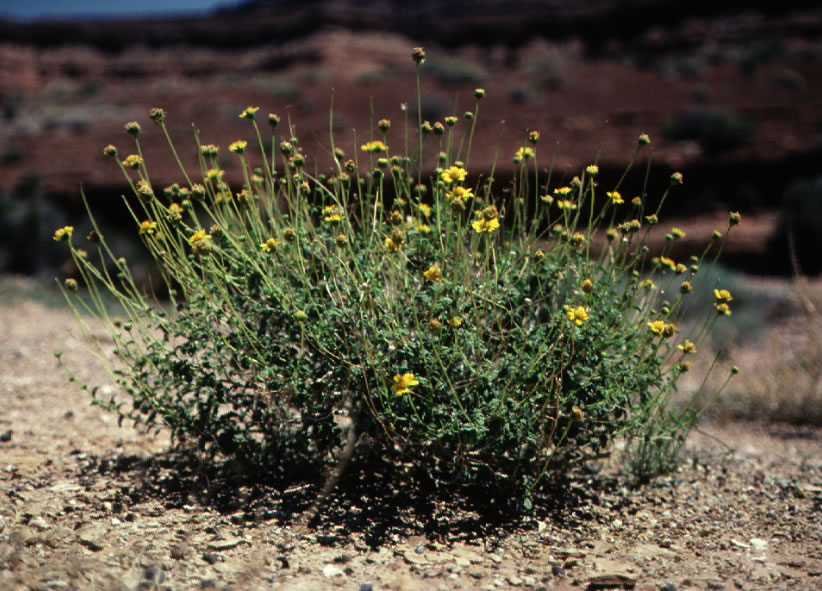

Scientific classification
- Kingdom: Plantae
- Clade: Tracheophytes
- Clade: Angiosperms
- Clade: Eudicots
- Clade: Asterids
- Order: Asterales
- Family: Asteraceae
- Genus: Encelia
- Species: E. resinifera

Binomial name
- Encelia resinifera C.Clark

Synonyms
- Encelia frutescens var. resinosa M.E.Jones ex S.F.Blake not Encelia resinosa Brandegee

= Encelia resinifera =

Species of flowering plant

Encelia resinifera, the sticky brittlebush, is a North American species of flowering plant in the family Asteraceae.

== Distribution ==
The species is found at elevations between 1,100–1,700 metres (3,600–5,600 ft) in the states of Arizona and Utah, in the Southwestern United States. It grows in soils derived from sandstone.

== Description ==
Encelia resinifera is a shrub ranging in height from 40–150 centimetres (1.3–4.9 ft). The trunk, which becomes fissured with age, supports slender stems.

The leaves, which range between 10 and 25 mm in length, are ovate or lanceolate and are usually pointed at the tips.

The yellow flowerheads are borne singly, appearing between May and July (late fall to mid-summer) in their native range. These have 8-13 ray florets.

=== Subspecies ===
Two subspecies have been identified:

- Encelia resinifera subsp. resinifera — button brittlebush.
- Encelia resinifera subsp. tenuifolia C.Clark — found in the Grand Canyon area. It has both leaves and ray laminae with a length that is more than three times their width.

== Taxonomy ==
Encelia resinifera was originally described as a variety of Encelia frutescens (Encelia frutescens var. resinosa) by M.E.Jones in 1913. In 1998 it was reclassified as a distinct species by Curtis Clark.
