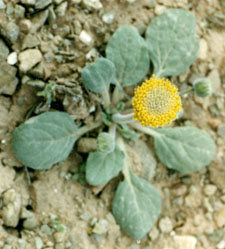

Conservation status
- Secure (NatureServe)

Scientific classification
- Kingdom: Plantae
- Clade: Tracheophytes
- Clade: Angiosperms
- Clade: Eudicots
- Clade: Asterids
- Order: Asterales
- Family: Asteraceae
- Genus: Encelia
- Species: E. nutans

Binomial name
- Encelia nutans Eastw.

Synonyms
- Enceliopsis nutans (Eastw.) A.Nelson

= Encelia nutans =

Species of flowering plant

Encelia nutans, called noddinghead, or nodding sunray, is a North American species of flowering plants in the family Asteraceae. It has been found only in Utah and Colorado in the western United States.

Encelia nutans is a shrub up to 25 cm (10 inches) tall, with swollen roots up to 10 cm (4 inches) in diameter. Leaves are small and green, egg-shaped, rarely more than 5 cm (2 inches) long. Flower heads are produced one per stem, with yellow disc florets but no ray florets.
