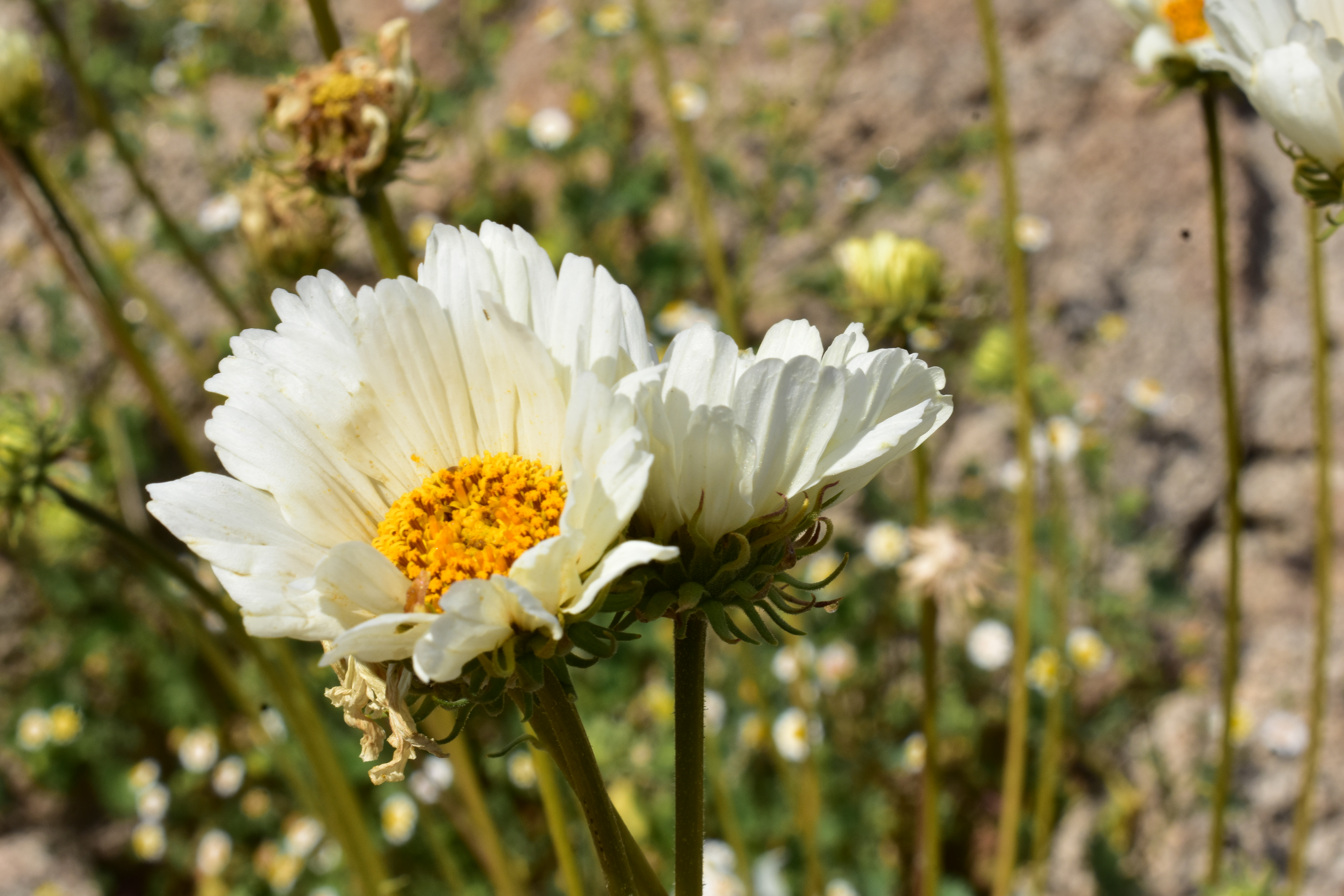
- Encelia ravenii, San Felipe Late January, 2019

Scientific classification
- Kingdom: Plantae
- Clade: Tracheophytes
- Clade: Angiosperms
- Clade: Eudicots
- Clade: Asterids
- Order: Asterales
- Family: Asteraceae
- Tribe: Heliantheae
- Genus: Encelia
- Species: E. ravenii

Binomial name
- Encelia ravenii Elmer

= Encelia ravenii =

Species of flowering plant

Encelia ravenii is a multi−branched perennial shrub, reaching 1–3 feet (0.30–0.91 m) in height. The branches are lined with oval to roughly triangular leaves a few centimeters long, that are gray-green and woolly in texture.

The inflorescence is a solitary daisylike flower head 1–2 inches (2.5–5.1 cm) in diameter, on a tall, erect peduncle. The head has a center of many yellow disc florets surrounded by up to 25 white ray florets. The involucre consists of long, prominent phyllaries. It blooms in the Spring.

The fruit is an achene about half a centimeter long, usually lacking a pappus. The fruits have ciliate margins.

Encelia ravenii was described in 1965 by American botanist Ira Loren Wiggins after another American botanist Peter H. Raven.

== Distribution ==
The plant is native to Baja California in México, where it is known only from one small granite hill near the Gulf Coast town of San Felipe.
