= 5-Acetyl-2-methoxybenzaldehyde =

3-Acetyl-6-methoxybenzaldehyde
- Chemical structure of 3-acetyl-6-methoxybenzaldehyde

Names
- Preferred IUPAC name 5-Acetyl-2-methoxybenzaldehyde
- Other names 3-Acetyl-6-methoxybenzaldehyde

Identifiers
CAS Number	531-99-7
3D model (JSmol)	Interactive image
ChemSpider	254697
PubChem CID	288758
UNII	PKZ321UNPK
CompTox Dashboard (EPA)	DTXSID90302303
- InChI: InChI=1S/C10H10O3/c1-7(12)8-3-4-10(13-2)9(5-8)6-11/h3-6H,1-2H3 Key: WGQVKYPDHREEJU-UHFFFAOYSA-N
- SMILES: CC(=O)C1=CC(=C(C=C1)OC)C=O

Properties
Chemical formula	C_{10}H_{10}O_{3}
Molar mass	178.18 g/mol
Density	1.137 g/mL
Boiling point	333 °C (631 °F; 606 K)
- Except where otherwise noted, data are given for materials in their standard state (at 25 °C [77 °F], 100 kPa). verify (what is ?) Infobox references

3-Acetyl-6-methoxybenzaldehyde or 5-acetyl-2-methoxybenzaldehyde is a growth and germination inhibiting chemical compound found in the leaves of Encelia farinosa.
