= Encelia scaposa =

Scientific classification
- Kingdom: Plantae
- Clade: Tracheophytes
- Clade: Angiosperms
- Clade: Eudicots
- Clade: Asterids
- Order: Asterales
- Family: Asteraceae
- Genus: Encelia
- Species: E. scaposa

Binomial name
- Encelia scaposa (A.Gray) A.Gray

Synonyms
- Encelia lineariloba M.E.Jones; Simsia scaposa A.Gray

Species of flowering plant

Encelia scaposa, common name onehead brittlebush is a North American species of flowering plants in the family Asteraceae. It has been found in western Texas, southwestern New Mexico, and Chihuahua.

Encelia scaposa is a shrub up to 60 cm (2 feet) tall. Leaves are oblanceolate to linear, rarely more than 10 cm (4 inches) long. One plant can produce several flower heads. The heads are unusual in the genus in having as many as 40 ray florets in addition to the disc florets.
