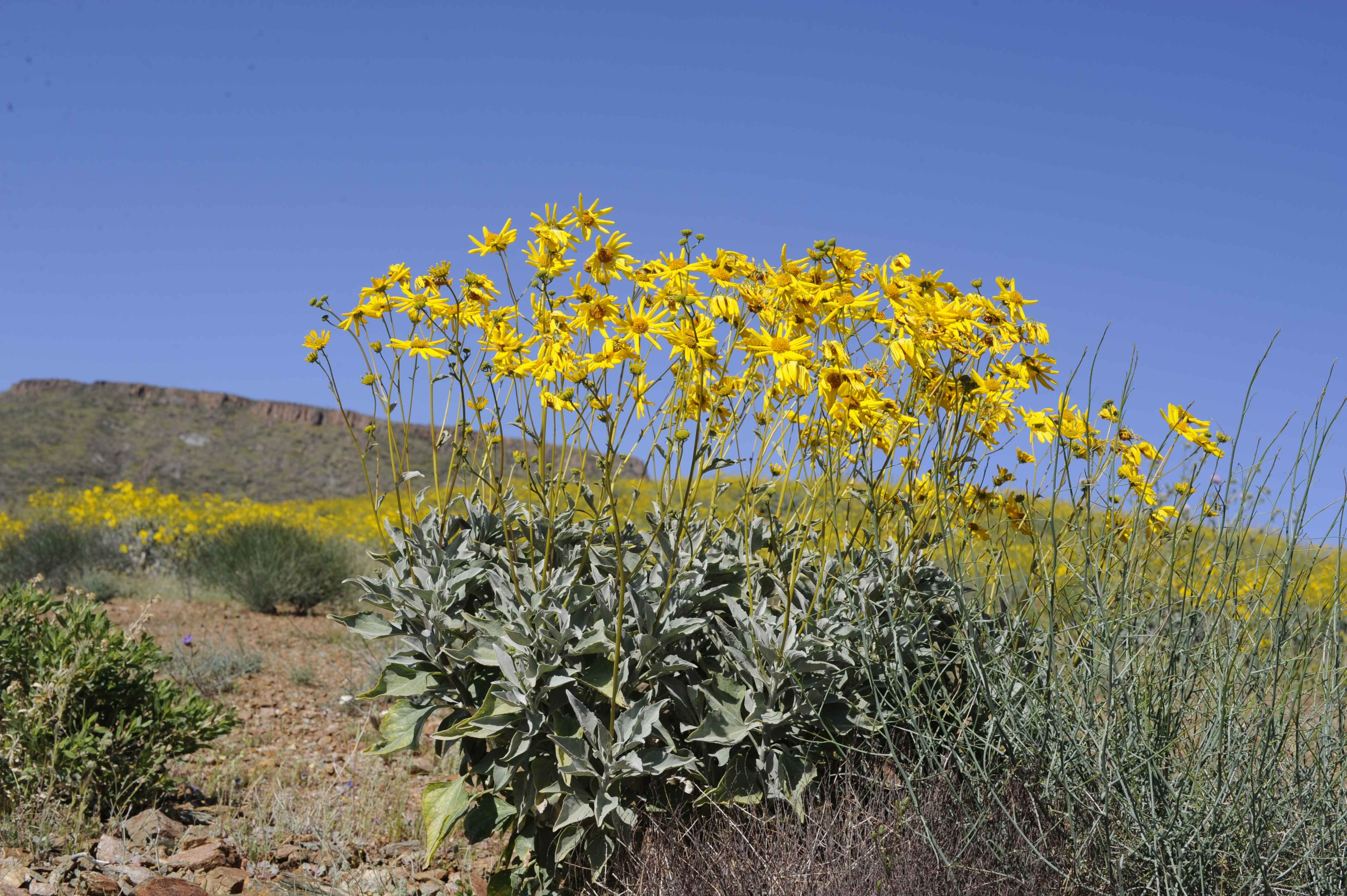
- Encelia farinosa in bloom

Scientific classification
- Kingdom: Plantae
- Clade: Tracheophytes
- Clade: Angiosperms
- Clade: Eudicots
- Clade: Asterids
- Order: Asterales
- Family: Asteraceae
- Tribe: Heliantheae
- Genus: Encelia
- Species: E. farinosa

Binomial name
- Encelia farinosa Torr. & A.Gray

= Encelia farinosa =

Brittlebush

Species of flowering plant

Encelia farinosa (commonly known as brittlebush, brittlebrush, or incienso), is a common desert shrub of the southwestern United States and northern Mexico. It has a variety of historical uses.

== Description ==
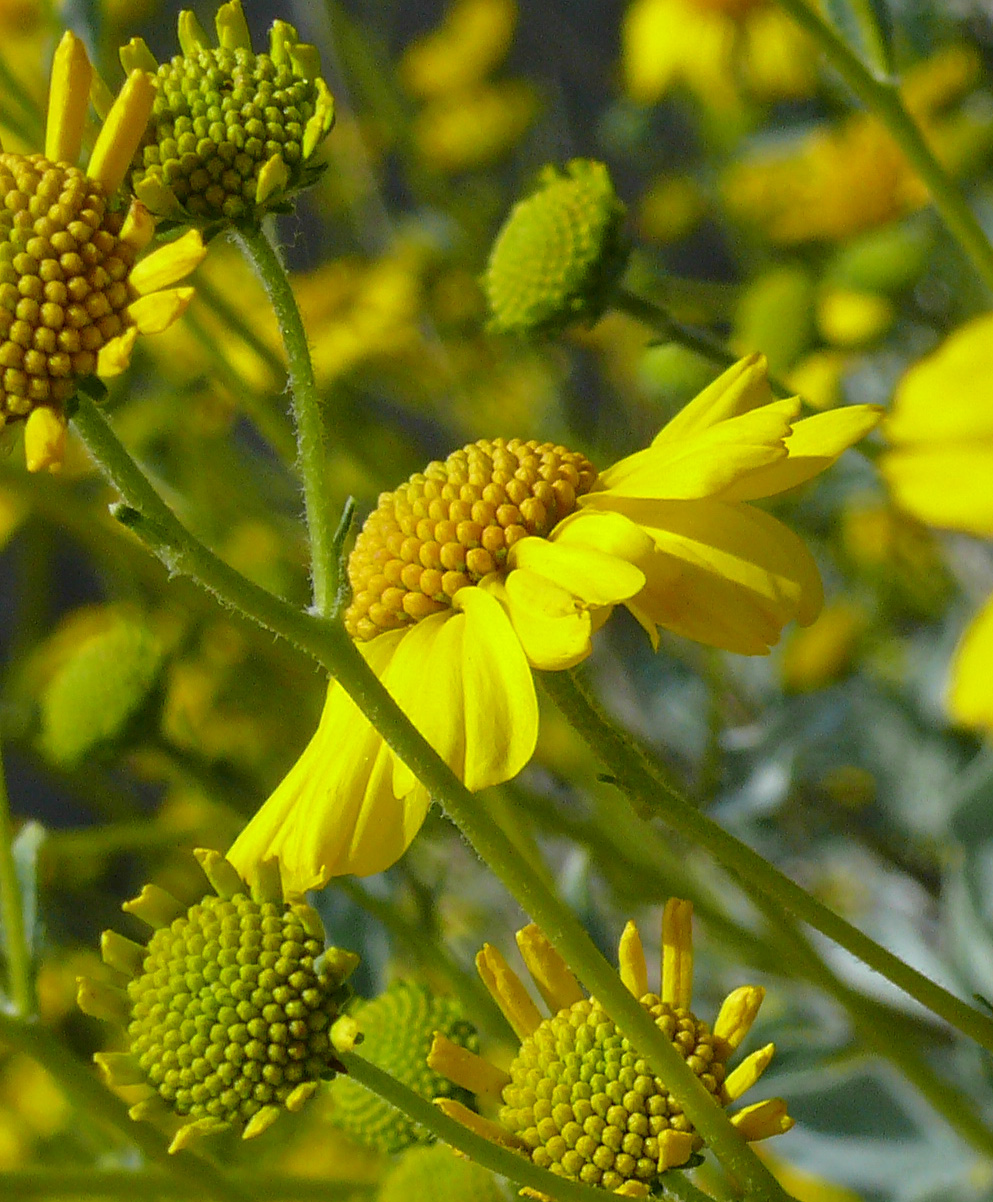
Brittlebush flower, in Sabino Canyon, Tucson, Arizona

Brittlebush grows up to 30 to 150 centimetres (12 to 59 inches) tall, with fragrant leaves 3–10 cm (1 1/4–4 in) long, ovate to deltoid, and silvery tomentose. Arranged in loose panicles above the leafy stems, the capitula are 3–3.5 cm (1 1/4–1 1/2 in) in diameter. Each has 8–18 orange-yellow ray florets, 6–15 millimetres (1/4–9/16 in) in length, and yellow or purple-brown disc florets. The fruit measures 3–6 mm (1/8–1/4 in) and no pappus is visible. During dry seasons the plant goes drought deciduous, shedding all of its foliage, relying on the water stored in its thick stems.

Encelia californica is similar, but has only one flower head per stalk.

=== Chemistry ===
The leaves contain 3-Acetyl-6-methoxybenzaldehyde.

== Taxonomy ==
=== Varieties ===
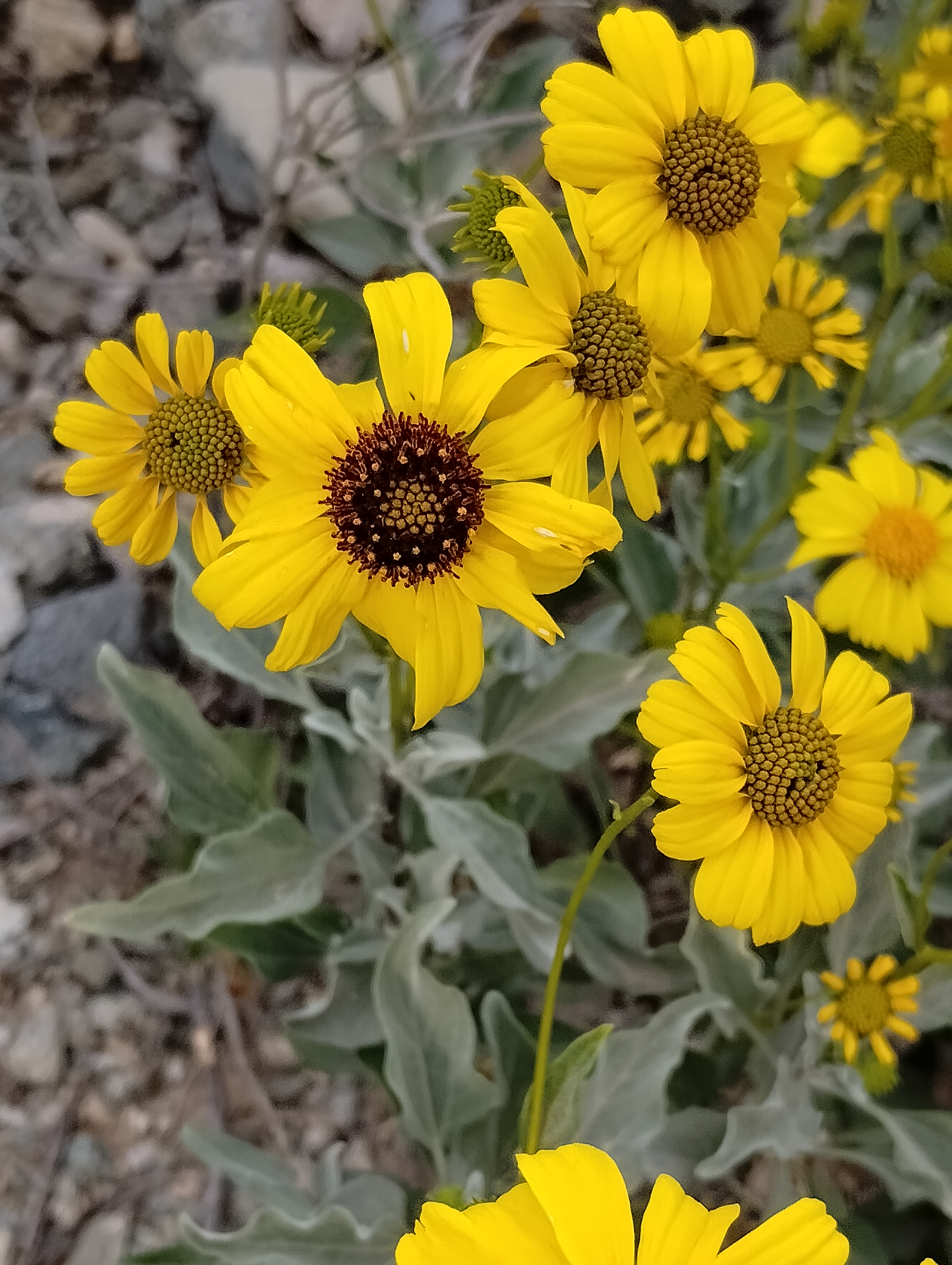
var. phenicodonta

Two varieties of E. farinosa are recognized by Flora of North America.

- Encelia farinosa var. farinosa – yellow disc florets
- Encelia farinosa var. phenicodonta (Blake) I.M.Johnston – purple-brown disc florets

Varieties formerly included E. f. var. radians, now regarded as a separate species E. radians Brandegee.

=== Etymology ===
The common name "brittlebush" comes from the brittleness of its stems. Other names include hierba del vaso (Spanish) and cotx (Seri). Another Spanish name for it is incienso because the dried sap was burned by early Spanish missions in the New World as incense.

== Distribution and habitat ==
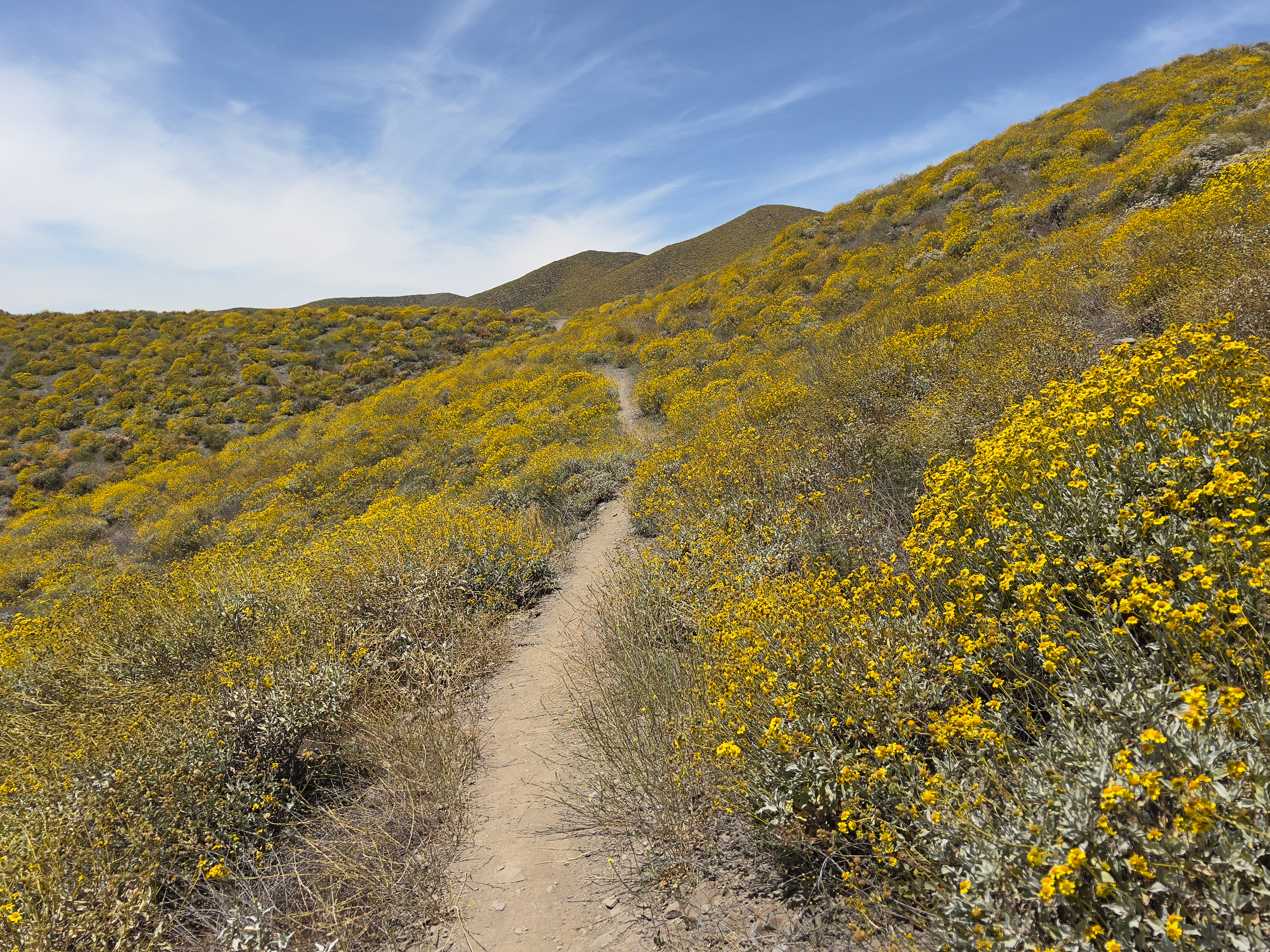
E. farinosa in California's Menifee Hills

Encelia farinosa is common in the southwestern United States (California, Arizona, Utah, and Nevada) and northern Mexico (Baja California, Baja California Sur, Sonora, Sinaloa, and Hidalgo).

It can be found in a variety of habitats from dry, gravelly slopes to open, sandy washes up to 1,000 metres (3,300 feet) above sea level. It requires a very sunny position in a deep very well-drained soil, and minimal winter frost.

It does well in cultivation often being used for border, erosion control, ground cover and massing. Recently the plant has spread dramatically in areas not natural to its distribution in large part because Caltrans has begun to use it in hydroseeding.

== Uses ==
Brittlebush has a long history of uses by indigenous and pioneer peoples, including:

- Glue: The resin collected from the base of the plant, yellowish to brown, can be heated and used as a glue. The O'odham and Seri use it for hafting, to hold points on arrows and harpoons.
- Sealer: A different sort of resin collected from the upper stems is more gummy and generally a clear yellow. The Seri use this to seal pottery vessels.
- Incense: Early Spanish friars learned that the resin made a highly fragrant incense, akin to frankincense in odor.
- Gum: The Sells area Tohono O'odham children use upper stem resin as a passable chewing gum.
- Toothbrush: Oldtime cowboys used brittlebush stem as a fine toothbrush.
- Medicinal: Seri use brittlebush to treat toothache; the bark is removed, the branch heated in ashes, and then placed in the mouth to "harden" a loose tooth. The Cahuilla used brittlebush to treat toothaches as well, and used it as a chest pain reliever by heating the gum and applying it to the chest.
- Waterproofing: It has been used to waterproof containers.
- Varnish: It has been melted then used as a varnish.
