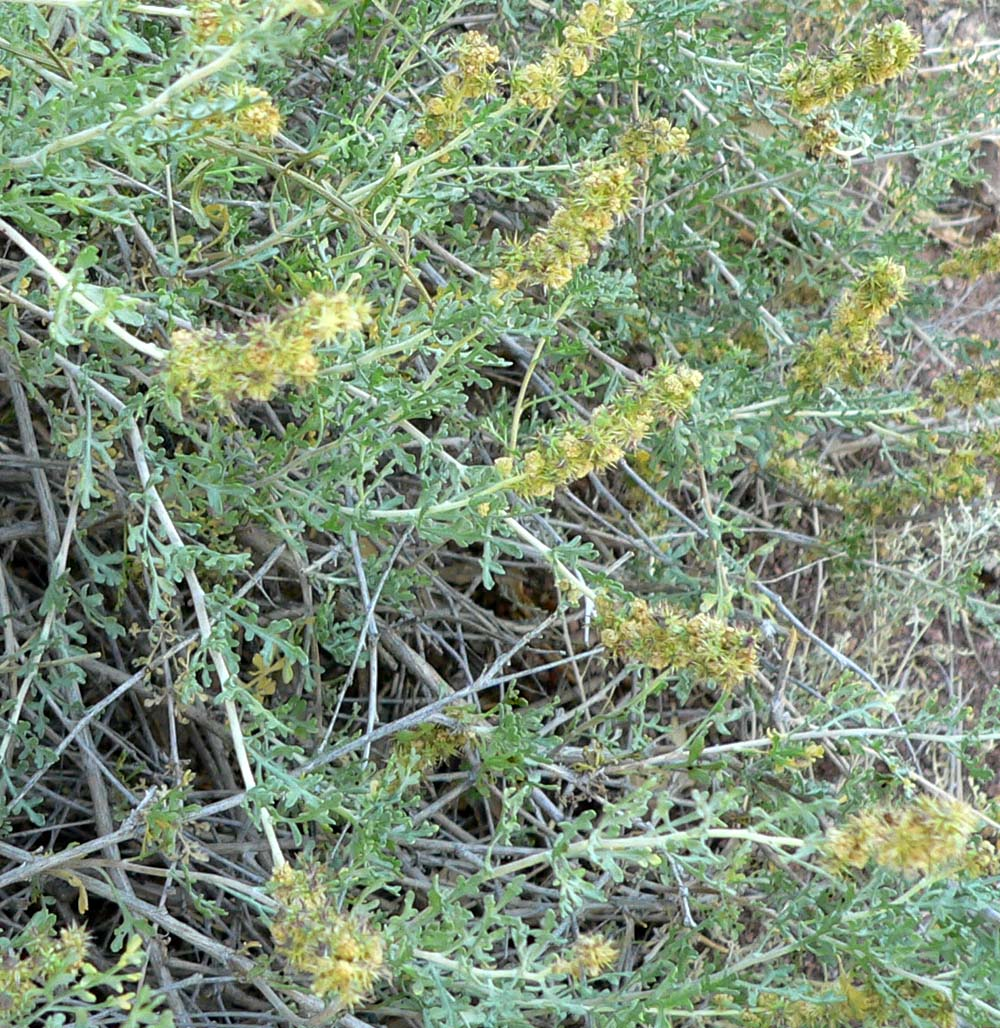

Scientific classification
- Kingdom: Plantae
- Clade: Tracheophytes
- Clade: Angiosperms
- Clade: Eudicots
- Clade: Asterids
- Order: Asterales
- Family: Asteraceae
- Tribe: Heliantheae
- Genus: Ambrosia
- Species: A. dumosa

Binomial name
- Ambrosia dumosa (A.Gray) W.W.Payne

Synonyms
- Franseria albicaulis Torr.; Franseria dumosa A.Gray; Gaertnera dumosa (A.Gray) Kuntze; Gaertneria dumosa (A.Gray) Kuntze

= Ambrosia dumosa =

Species of flowering plant

Ambrosia dumosa, the burro-weed or white bursage, a North American species of shrub in the family Asteraceae. It is a common constituent of the creosote-bush scrub community throughout the Mojave Desert of California, Nevada, and Utah and the Sonoran Desert of Arizona and northwestern Mexico (Baja California, Baja California Sur, Sonora, Chihuahua).

Ambrosia dumosa has been studied to determine allelopathic interactions with creosote bush, Larrea tridentata, which produces a chemical that inhibits the growth of A. dumosa. Other studies have suggested that A. dumosa roots produce a chemical that causes them to grow away from conspecific roots, preventing competition for water resources. In addition to burro-weed, A. dumosa is also commonly called white bursage, and burrobush.

== Description ==
Ambrosia dumosa or white bursage is a form of ragweed, is a highly branched shrub 20 to 90 cm in height. The younger stems are covered with soft gray-white hairs. Approximately obovate leaves are 1 to 3 times pinnately compound or deeply lobed and generally clustered on short branches. The leaves are 0.5 to 4 cm long and also covered in soft gray-white hairs.

Its inflorescence is yellow with staminate and pistillate headson a single plant (monoecious). Staminate heads have many flowers and are 3 to 5 mm in diameter with a 5 to 8 lobed involucre. Pistillate heads are 2 flowered and lack corollas.

Ambrosia dumosa has spherical bur-like fruits ranging in color from golden to purple to brown. Along with microscopic hairs, the fruit has 12 to 35 flat and straight spines which are 5 to 9 mm in length and scattered over the surface.

Ambrosia dumosa becomes dormant during drought, losing all of its leaves to prevent water loss by transpiration; drought deciduous. During this time, it can still be recognized by the presence of longitudinal stripes on smaller stems.

Like other types of Ambrosia, this is a ragweed, wind-blown pollen from burro-weed can cause serious allergic reactions. Increasing cases in Mojave Desert as the population grows from Joshua Tree, CA to Las Vegas, NV.
