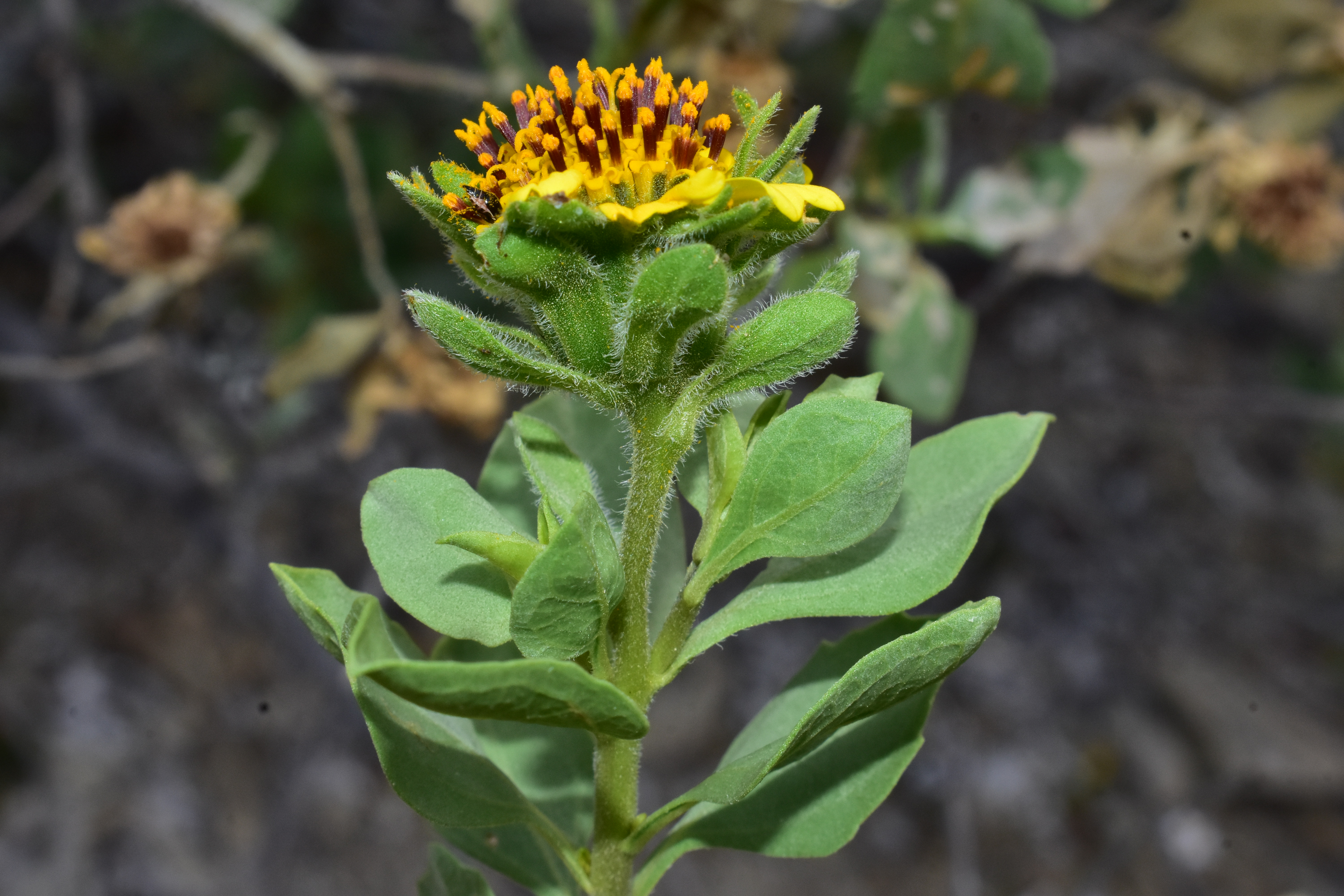
- Encelia densifolia in habitat

Scientific classification
- Kingdom: Plantae
- Clade: Embryophytes
- Clade: Tracheophytes
- Clade: Spermatophytes
- Clade: Angiosperms
- Clade: Eudicots
- Clade: Asterids
- Order: Asterales
- Family: Asteraceae
- Tribe: Heliantheae
- Genus: Encelia
- Species: E. densifolia

Binomial name
- Encelia densifolia C.Clark & Kyhos

= Encelia densifolia =

Species of flowering plant

Encelia densifolia is a species of perennial shrub in the sunflower family commonly known as the Vizcaino encelia. This species is endemic to the Vizcaino Peninsula of Baja California Sur, Mexico.

== Description ==
Multi−branched perennial shrub, reaching 1–3 feet (0.30–0.91 m) in height. The branches are lined with dentate, triangular leaves a few centimeters long, that are light green, hairless and smooth in texture.

The inflorescence is a solitary daisylike flower head 1–2 inches (2.5–5.1 cm) in diameter, on a short, leaved peduncle. The head has a center of many yellow disc florets surrounded by up to 12 yellow ray florets. The involucre consists of canescent, obtuse phyllaries. It blooms in spring.

The fruit is an achene about half a centimeter long, usually lacking a pappus. The fruits have ciliate margins.

== Distribution ==
The plant is native to Baja California Sur, México, where it is known only from one small, remote arroyo in the Sierra Santa Clara on the Vizcaino Peninsula.
