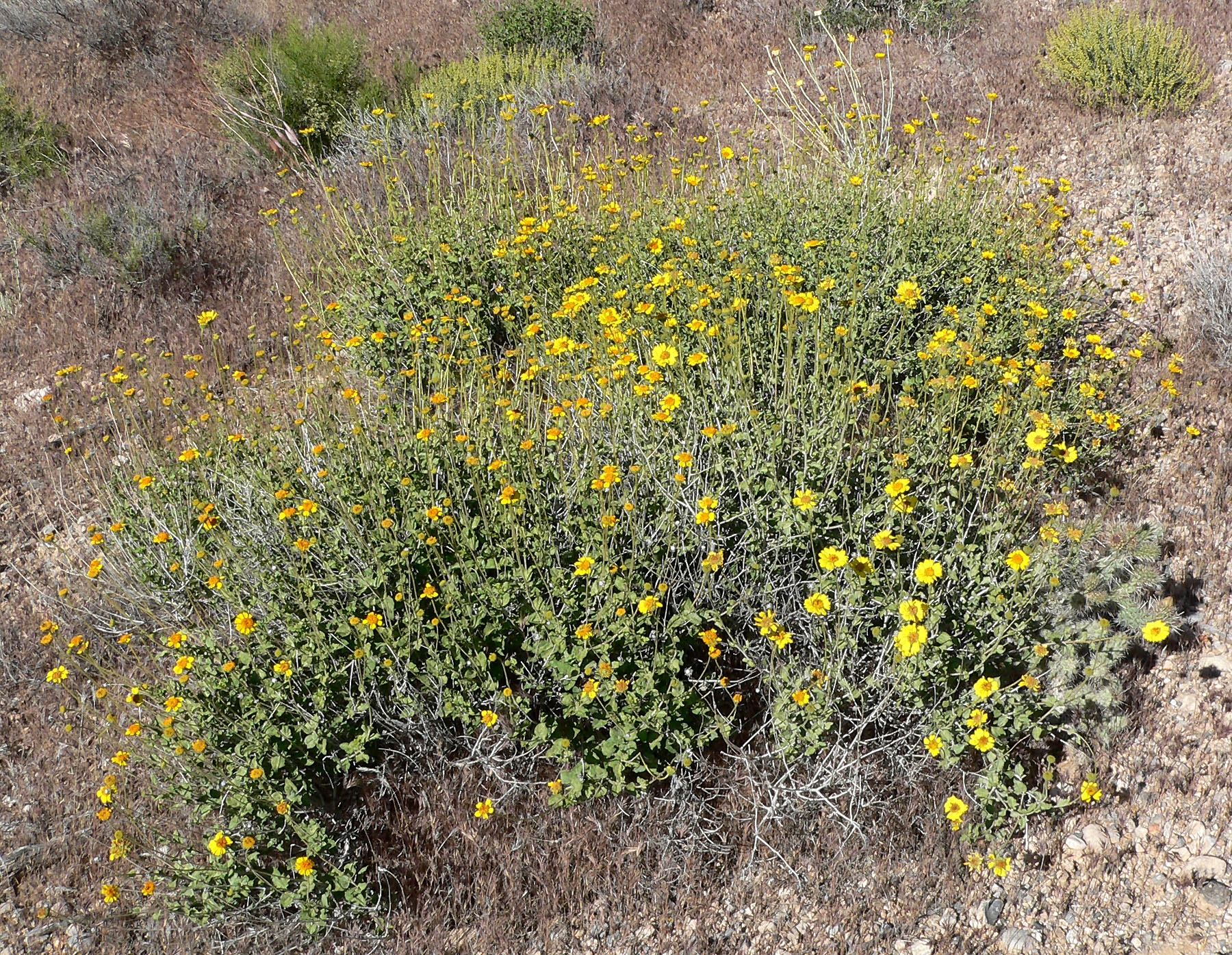

Scientific classification
- Kingdom: Plantae
- Clade: Tracheophytes
- Clade: Angiosperms
- Clade: Eudicots
- Clade: Asterids
- Order: Asterales
- Family: Asteraceae
- Genus: Encelia
- Species: E. virginensis

Binomial name
- Encelia virginensis A.Nels.

Synonyms
- Encelia virginensis var. actoni A.Nels., syn of var. actonii; Encelia actonii Elmer, syn of var. actonii; Encelia actoni Elmer, syn of var. actonii

= Encelia virginensis =

Species of flowering plant

Encelia virginensis is a North American species of flowering plants in the family Asteraceae known by the common name Virgin River brittlebush. This shrub is native to the southwestern United States and northwestern Mexico, particularly the Mojave Desert and the Sonoran Desert. It has been found in Baja California, southern California, Nevada, Arizona, southwestern Utah, and southwestern New Mexico.

Encelia virginensis is a bushy, sprawling shrub reaching heights between 100 and 150 cm (40-60 inches). It has many branches, with the younger parts hairy and the older stems developing a thickened bark. The gray-green, fuzzy to hairy foliage may be sparse, appearing pale because of the presence of many small hairs on the surface. Atop many erect, hairy stems are solitary daisy-like flower heads with 11 to 21 ray florets which are generally yellow, and a center of yellow disc florets. The fruit is an achene 5 to 8 millimeters long and usually lacking a pappus.

Varieties

- Encelia virginensis var. actonii (Elmer) B.L.Turner - California, Nevada, Baja California
- Encelia virginensis var. virginensis - southern California, Nevada, Arizona, southwestern Utah, and southwestern New Mexico
