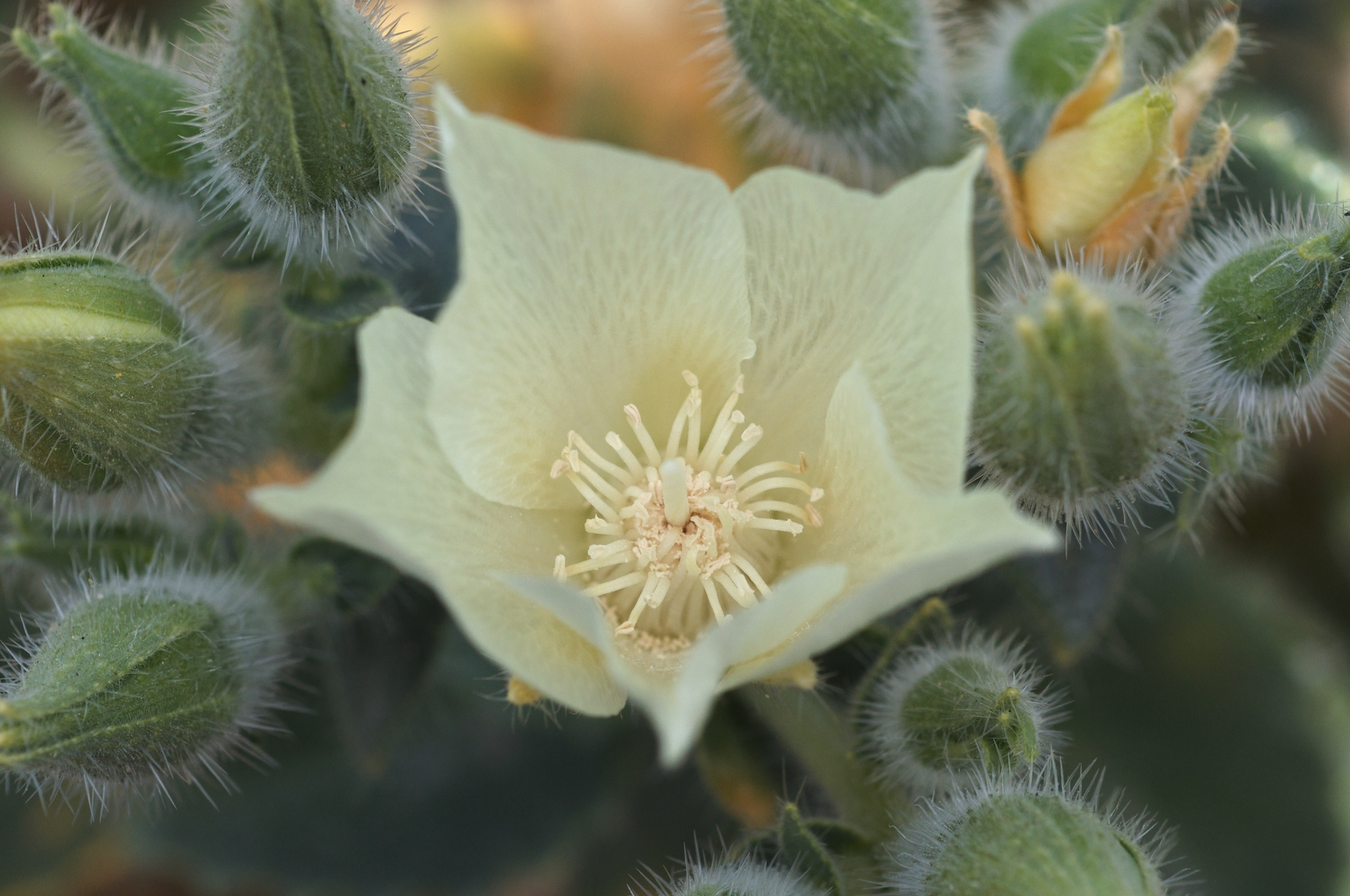

Conservation status
- Apparently Secure (NatureServe)

Scientific classification
- Kingdom: Plantae
- Clade: Tracheophytes
- Clade: Angiosperms
- Clade: Eudicots
- Clade: Asterids
- Order: Cornales
- Family: Loasaceae
- Genus: Eucnide
- Species: E. urens

Binomial name
- Eucnide urens Parry, 1875

= Eucnide urens =

Desert rock nettle

Species of flowering plant

Eucnide urens, also known as desert rock nettle or desert stingbush, is a shrub which is native to desert areas in California, Arizona, Utah, Southern Nevada, and Baja California. Other common names are velcro plant and vegetable velcro.

The flowers, which appear from spring to early summer, are cream or pale yellow with 5 petals and are 2.5 to 5 cm (0.98 to 1.97 in) long. The coarsely serrated leaves are 2 to 6.5 cm (0.79 to 2.56 in) long with stinging hairs which are also found on the stems and buds. It grows in the desert on cliffs and dry, rocky places.

The plant is round and bushy and is usually between 30 and 60 cm (12 and 24 in) in height and is often found on cliff faces. Desert bighorn sheep feed on the flowers.
