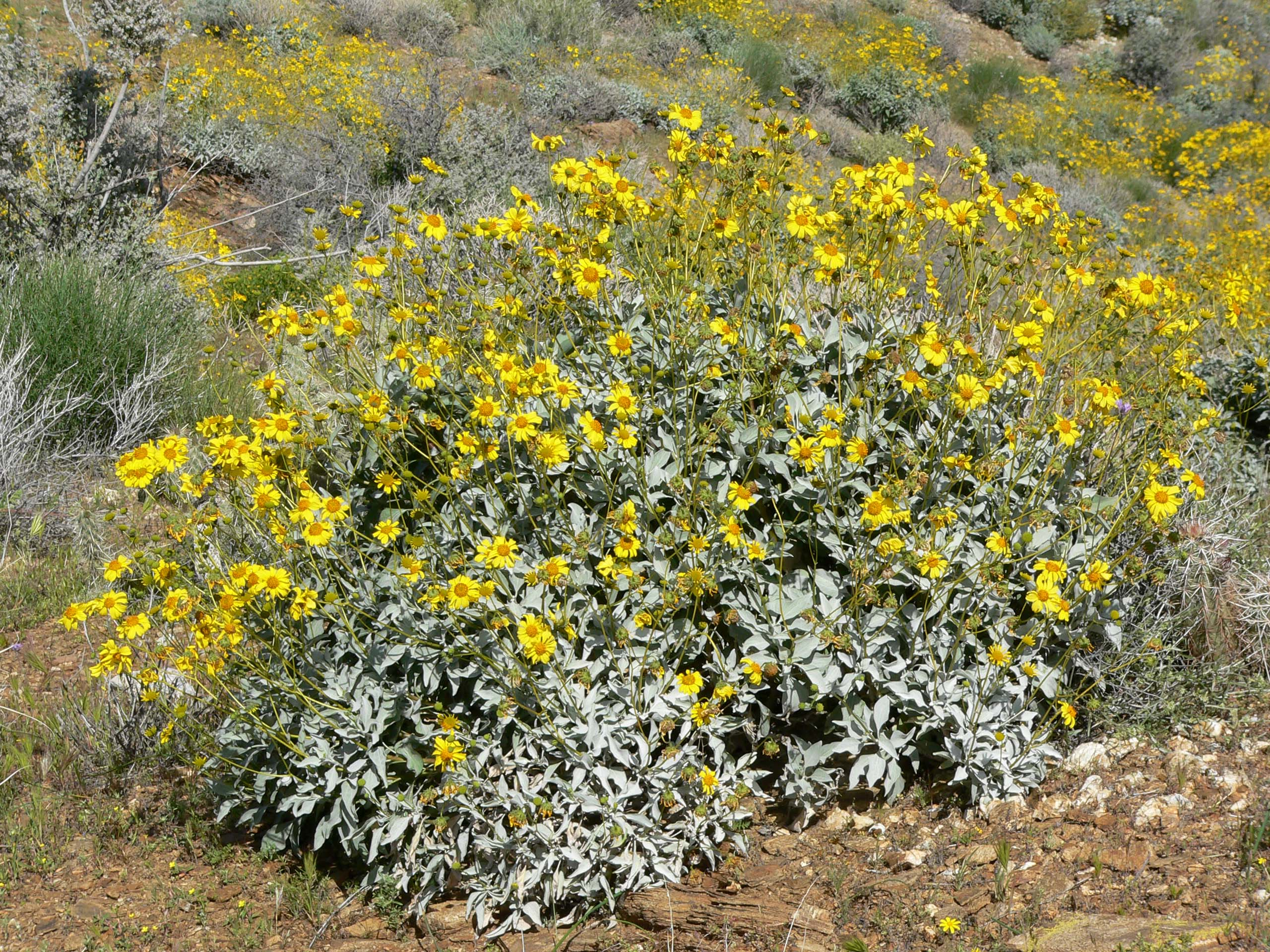
- Encelia farinosa near Palm Springs, California

Scientific classification
- Kingdom: Plantae
- Clade: Tracheophytes
- Clade: Angiosperms
- Clade: Eudicots
- Clade: Asterids
- Order: Asterales
- Family: Asteraceae
- Subfamily: Asteroideae
- Tribe: Heliantheae
- Subtribe: Enceliinae
- Genus: Encelia; Adans.

Synonyms
- Armania Bertero ex DC.; Pallasia L'Hér. ex L'Hér.

= Encelia =

Genus of flowering plants

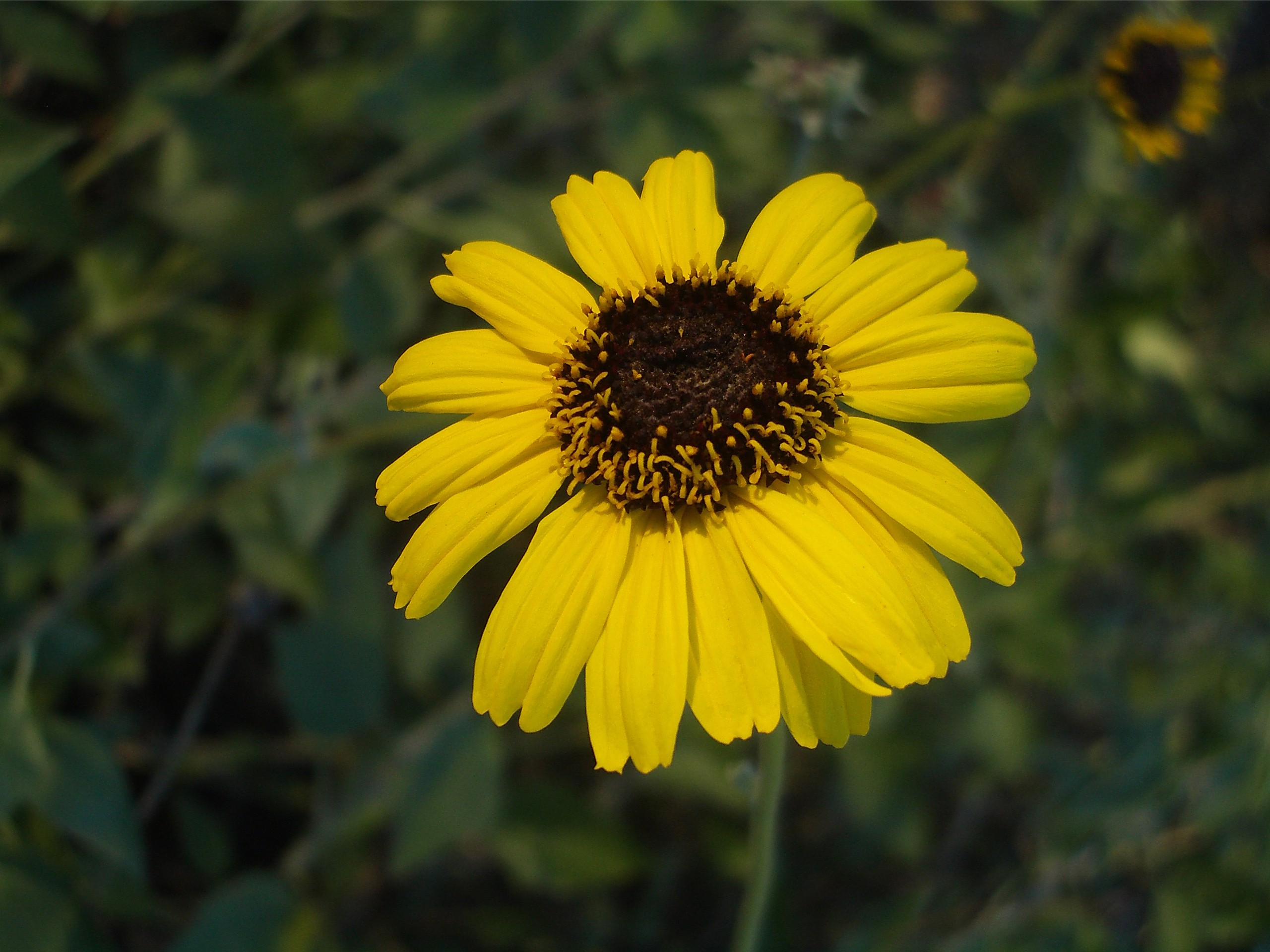
Encelia californica

Encelia is a genus of the plant family Asteraceae whose members are frequently called brittlebushes. It consists of shrubs (and one geophyte) of arid environments in southwestern North America and western South America.

All have n = 18 chromosomes. All the North American species are obligate outcrossers. In cultivation, the species readily form fertile F_{1} hybrids, F_{2}s, and backcrosses, but in natural areas of sympatry, F2s and backcrosses are absent or rare.

Encelia species are used as food plants by the larvae of some Lepidoptera species including the leaf miner Bucculatrix enceliae which feeds exclusively on Encelia farinosa.

The phylogenetic sister group of Encelia is a clade comprising the genera Enceliopsis and Geraea. The three genera are informally called the "Encelia alliance".

Encelia is named in honor of German biologist Christophorus Enzelius, 1517–1583.

Species

- Encelia actoni Elmer - California
- Encelia asperifolia (S.F.Blake) C. Clark & Kyhos - Baja California
- Encelia californica Nutt. - Baja California, Baja California Sur, California
- Encelia canescens Lam. - Peru, northern Chile, Bolivia
- Encelia conspersa Benth. - Baja California Sur
- Encelia densifolia C.Clark & Kyhos - Baja California Sur
- Encelia farinosa Torr. & A.Gray var. farinosa - brittlebush - Baja California, Baja California Sur, California, Sonora, Sinaloa, Hidalgo, Arizona, Utah, Nevada
- Encelia frutescens (A.Gray) A.Gray - Arizona, California, Nevada, Baja California
- Encelia halimifolia Cav. - Baja California, Baja California Sur, Sonora
- Encelia hispida Andersson - Galápagos
- Encelia laciniata Vasey & Rose - Baja California, Baja California Sur
- Encelia nutans Eastwood - Utah, Colorado
- Encelia palmeri Vasey & Rose - Baja California Sur
- Encelia pilocarpa Rubsy- Bolivia
- Encelia pilosiflora S.F.Blake - Peru
- Encelia ravenii Wiggins - Baja California Sur
- Encelia resinifera C. Clark - Utah, Arizona
- Encelia scaposa (A.Gray) A.Gray- Chihuahua, Texas, New Mexico
- Encelia stenophylla Greene - Baja California, Baja California Sur
- Encelia ventorum T.S Brandegee - Baja California, Baja California Sur
- Encelia virginensis A. Nels. - California, Arizona, Utah, Nevada, New Mexico
