= Drought deciduous =

Plants that shed their leaves during periods of drought or generally in a dry season

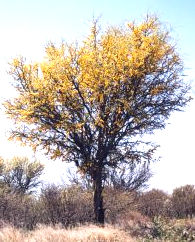
Geoffroea decorticans is both cold and drought deciduous: it loses its leaves in winter as well as during particularly dry summers

Drought deciduous, or drought semi-deciduous plants refer to plants that shed their leaves during periods of drought or in the dry season. This phenomenon is a natural process of plants and is caused due to the limitation of water around the environment where the plant is situated. In the spectrum of botany, deciduous is defined as a certain plant species that carries out abscission, the shedding of leaves of a plant or tree either due to age or other factors that cause the plant to regard these leaves as useless or not worth keeping over the course of a year. Deciduous plants can also be categorised differently than their adaptation to drought or dry seasons, which can be temperate deciduous during cold seasons, and in contrast to evergreen plants which do not shed leaves annually, possessing green leaves throughout the year.

== Botany ==
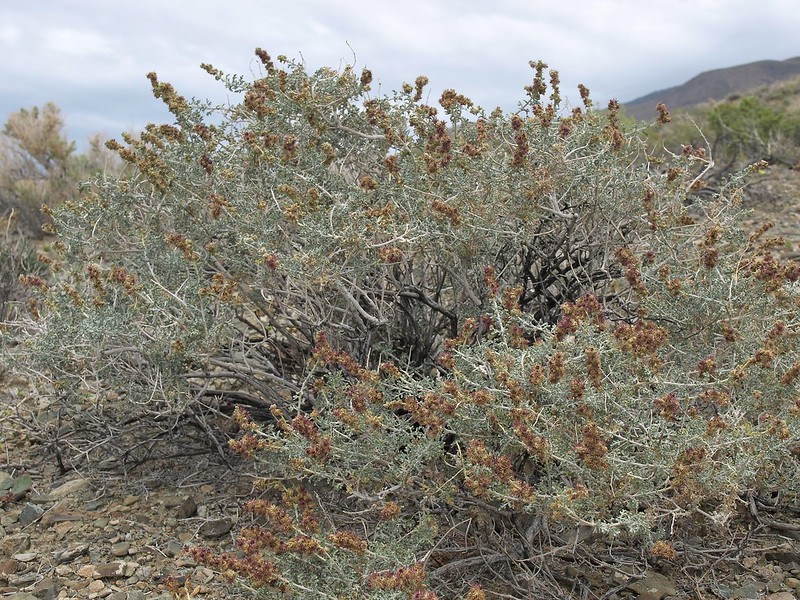
Ambrosia dumosa a is a type of Drought Deciduous plant among the Microphyllous species. This is an example when the plant is at a transitional state of progressing abscission and preparing to flower.

In botany, deciduous is a description of plants that carry out a process which leads to the loss of leaves during a certain time annually. This process of shedding leaves is known as abscission. Deciduous plants represent a variety of plant species among trees, shrubs and herbs. The causes of this phenomenon can vary depending on where the plant or the whole ecosystem is situated at. The characteristics of season, climate, temperate and rainfall of a certain region are all considered as factors that may have influenced the plants to be deciduous or influencing plants to have evolved as deciduous plants.

Cold deciduous species include deciduous plant species that will undergo abscission annually or on a seasonal basis. Cold deciduous plant species focus on conserving their nutrient to survive through the extreme conditions in winter. Drought deciduous species, depending on the region it is situated, would undergo abscission not necessarily due to cold weather, they may undergo this process due to shortage of water which may be limited due to relatively low rainfall and summers with a relatively higher temperature or unexpected prolonged season. Conversely, evergreen plant species carry out abscission in a smaller scale continuously in any seasons throughout the year.

Mechanisms that trigger leaf drop is a process which includes physiological and chemical pathways happening within the plants. These include hormonal changes to gradually reduce the use of chlorophyll and generation of certain pigments which is used normally to generate energy via photosynthesis in summer, which gives the autumn colour of the leaves. Carotenoids are the pigmentation that is responsible for the yellow or brown colour of the leaves as they started to lose the presence of chlorophyll. Anthocyanin is another type of pigmentation that is responsible for giving out red or purple colour of leaves. These pigmentations or the colour of leaves are generated by different concentrations of carbohydrate, nitrogen and chlorophyll. In relationship with the discolouring of leaves, deciduous plant species are able to reabsorb nutrients from the leaves as they progress into abscission.

The formation of abscission layer between the stem and the leaf petiole signifies the initiation of abscission. Abscission layer is

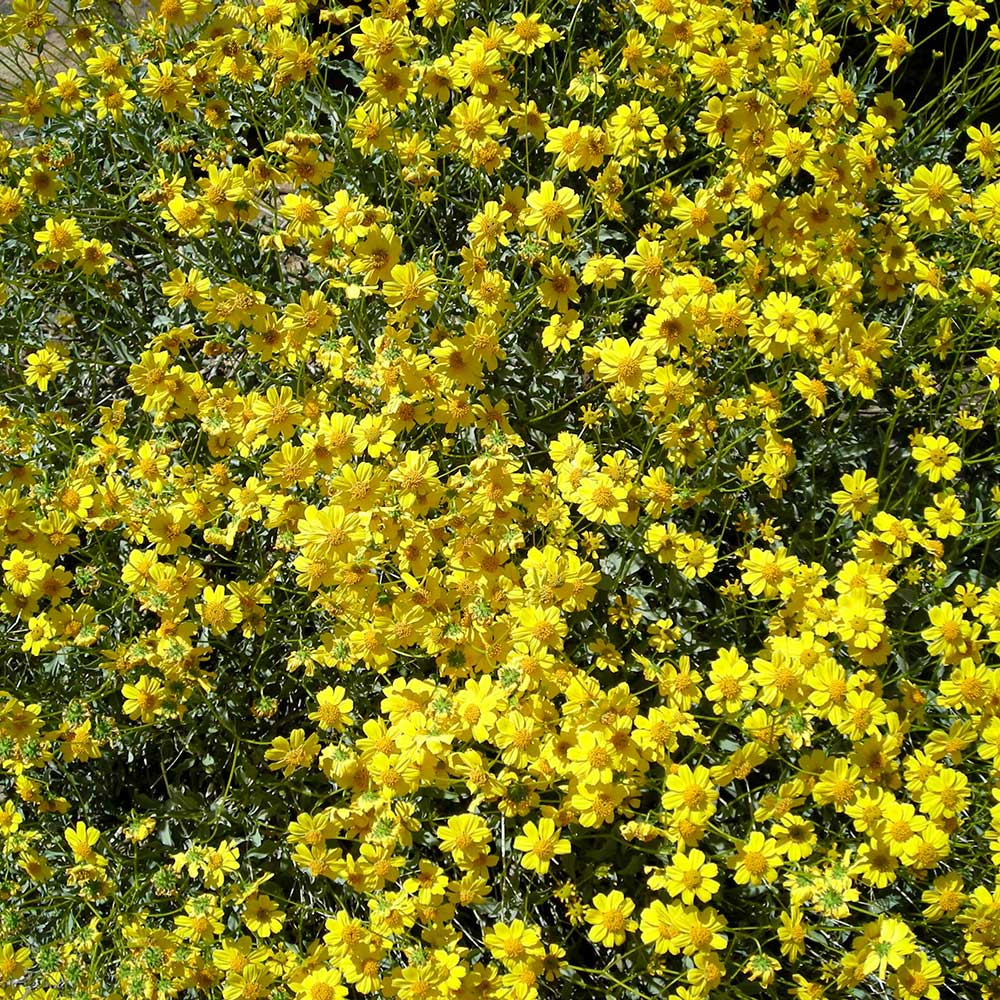
Encelia farinosa is a type of Drought Deciduous plant among the Broadleaf species. As indicated in the image, the plant is flowering after abscission as there are no leaves.

the region of separation between the leaves and the plant or the lamina and leaf base depending on plant species, which is referred collaboratively as the abscission zone. Within the abscission zones the types of cells are the same as the other parts of the plant, but with slight difference in abundance or quality. Sclerenchyma cells appears to be less abundant or weakly developed, Parenchyma cells are thin walled and compactly set with no intracellular spaces and there will be no presence of Collenchyma cells. This combination of cells makes the abscission zone particularly sensitive to the plant hormone known as auxin. Under normal condition, the flow of auxin remain consistent throughout the structures of the plant. When the plant is under stress, either due to climate or environmental factors, the auxin flow will be disrupted or stopped affecting the auxin levels reaching the abscission layer of leaves triggering the elongation of the plant cells within the zone. Subsequently, the abscission zone will break allowing the leave to set apart from the plant.

== Function ==
Deciduous plant will undergo the process of abscission either seasonally or due to external stress caused by the environment. By doing so, there are both advantages and disadvantages for the plant to lose its leaves rather than solely conserving nutrients and water. Many deciduous plant species make use of their leafless period efficiently by triggering reproductive processes such as flowering. Abscission allows the plant to perform dissemination of reproductive bodies, which includes seeds, fruits and pollens, some deciduous plant species prefer to flower after undergoing abscission. This allows the plant to take greater advantage in reproductive perspective as the plant takes much less energy to maintain itself and survive without the presence of leaves, the plant can utilise wind transmission of pollens effectively. The absence of leaves also allows the plant to utilise wind transmission of pollen more effectively or increasing the visibility of flowers allowing insects to spot and access to flowers easier thus pollinating plants.

Due to the natural structure of deciduous plant species, it has a higher tolerance to environmental stress factors which may cause damages such as branch and trunk breakage when compared to evergreen species. Abscission can also be noted as self-pruning of the plant, as the plant will shed leaves along with branches, flowered parts, fruits and injured parts. It is an excretory function of the plants as it removes waste materials that it accumulated throughout the year. Self-pruning also serves the original purpose of deciduous plant which is to remove excessive parts deemed unnecessary by the plant that might be competitive for water and nutrients. The absence of leaves can reduce the excessive energy required to repair damages of leaves to keep them functional which can be caused by predation from insects or other physical factors. As deciduous plant species would commit to full abscission to survive environmental stress, they must expend the extra energy that evergreen species will never need to in order to regrow a full new foliage when the harsh environmental condition resile or approaching to the next growing season.

=== Strategies in drought ===
Evergreen species are the opposite of deciduous species, evergreens possess a substantial amount of leaves throughout the year. One of the most differentiating characteristics of these plants is featuring roots that penetrate much deeper into the ground allowing evergreens to gain access to water source from underground and survive through a dry season. Plant species that possess features that appear to be in between of evergreens and deciduous can be categorised as semi-deciduous, semi-evergreen depending on their annual abscission and flowering patterns. Deciduous species possess roots that penetrate much shallower into the ground when compared to evergreens, therefore when a deciduous plant is put under stress or whenever the access to nutrient and water is limited due to external factors such as normal seasonal climate change and drought.

Deciduous plants will carry out abscission in the whole plant completely, which allows the plant to conserve its nutrient and energy to survive. Deciduous plants have a higher photochemical efficiency when compared to evergreen species during times when it has leaves during spring and summer. This allows it to take excessive energy and nutrients for storage and is the main strategy on surviving through days without the aid of chlorophyll and leaves in generating energy.

Apart from the prevention of water and nutrient loss, drought deciduous plant species can remove nutrients from leaves that are about to shed and store them as proteins in the other part of the plant. It can shed their leaves drought-deciduous species can adjust to only discharge nutrient after drought relief for canopy reconstruction and leave growth. Deciduous plant species can resorb Nitrogen, Phosphorus and Potassium which are the fundamental elements required by plants. This can additionally prevent significant impacts due to nutrient losses caused by leaf abscission. During the period after abscission had occurred, reserves of twig nitrogen in drought-deciduous species change accordingly with season or external stress, whereas evergreen species had a constant twig nitrogen level throughout the year.

== Ecosystems ==
In botany, plant and leaf phenology from ecosystems that are situated in high latitudes can be predicted based on seasonal cycle, where four seasons are highly distinctive. Ecosystems that are considered semi-arid and savanna-type (SAST) are less consistent and the range in both climate and plant species within these ecosystems vary significantly. Drought deciduous plants species are often found in SAST ecosystems as they have higher tolerance to unpredicted external stress factors. These plant species are also very common in areas that have relatively dry seasons especially ecosystems that situates at the edges of deserts.

=== Regions ===
Drought deciduous plant species can be found in the most part of Europe, the eastern part of North and South America, Southern part of Africa and Southern and Eastern part of Asia, particularly temperate regions that require the plants to cope with water shortages over the course of dry seasons. Common deciduous plant species, either temperate or drought, will appear in temperate deciduous forest biomes which alternates continuously. It usually has distinct seasonal differences, winter, spring, summer and autumn, and an obvious contrast of winter and summer.

Whereas cold-deciduous plant species are commonly found in regions towards lower latitudes of the planet. These plant species can cope with climatic conditions that are more extreme in respect of temperatures.

== Examples of drought deciduous species ==
Drought deciduous plants are very commonly found near the borders of deserts or along the coastal areas in the Northern Americas. Encelia fairnosa (commonly known as brittlebush) is a very common broadleaf drought deciduous plant species found near the desert around the northern part of Mexico and along the West Coast of the United States. Ambrosia Dumosa (commonly known as Burroweed) is a common microphyllous drought deciduous species which is found near those same areas as it lives within similar ecosystems as the brittlebush. Although both these examples are able to undergo abscission in response to droughts or dry seasons, they are from different plant families.

== See also ==
- Evergreen
- Deciduous
- Abscission
