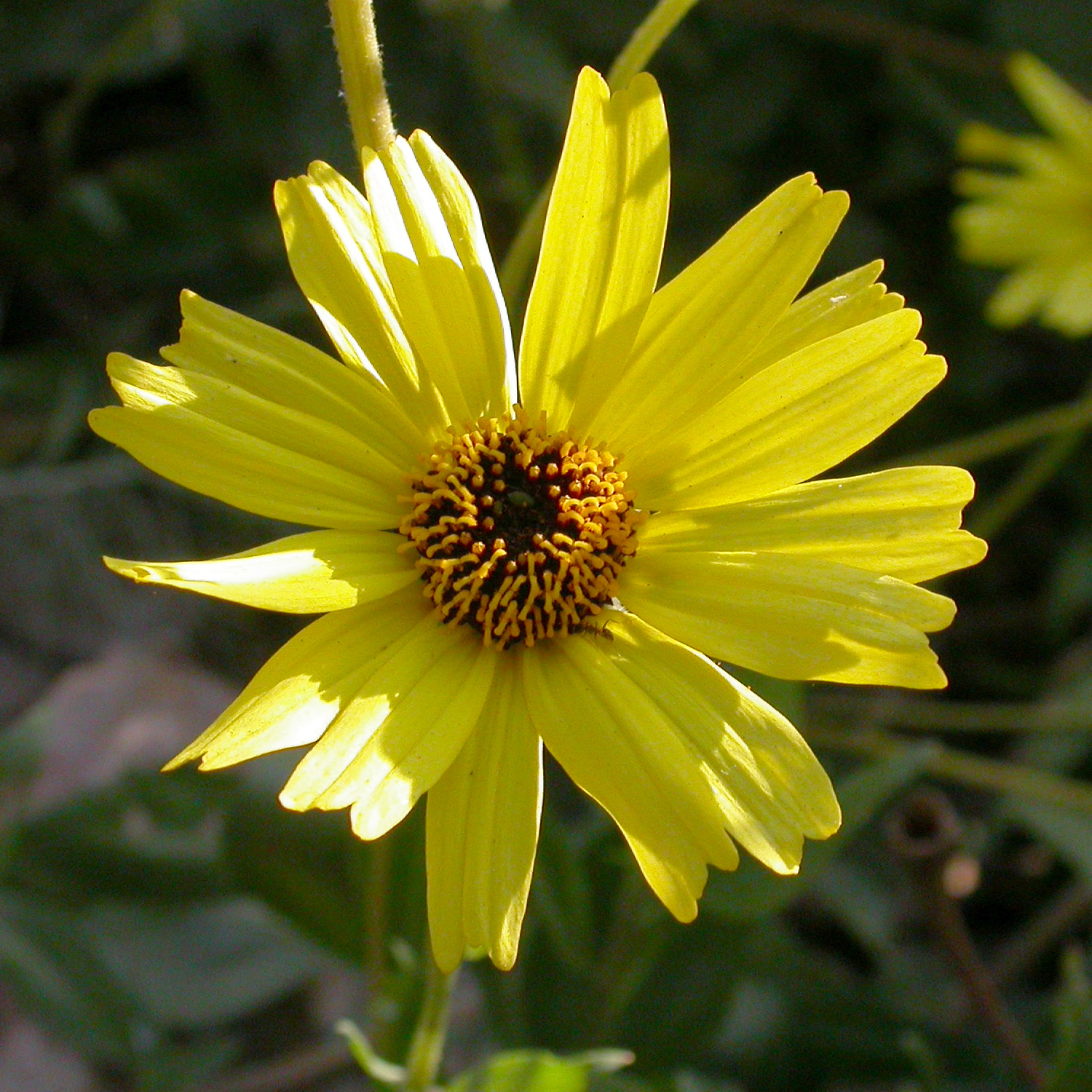

Scientific classification
- Kingdom: Plantae
- Clade: Tracheophytes
- Clade: Angiosperms
- Clade: Eudicots
- Clade: Asterids
- Order: Asterales
- Family: Asteraceae
- Genus: Encelia
- Species: E. californica

Binomial name
- Encelia californica Nutt.

Synonyms
- Encelia conspersa A.Gray

= Encelia californica =

Species of flowering plant

Encelia californica is a species of flowering plant in the family Asteraceae It is commonly referred to as California coast sunflower and California bush sunflower.

== Distribution ==
This shrub is native to southern California (U.S.) and northern Baja California (México). It is a member of the coastal sage plant community at the shoreline, and the chaparral and woodlands plant community on inland foothills in the Transverse and Peninsular Ranges.

== Description ==
Encelia californica is a bushy shrub that reaches between 50–150 cm (20-60 inches) in height. It has many thin branches covered in widely spaced green leaves which are a rounded diamond shape.

The solitary flower heads are daisy like, with 15 to 25 bright yellow ray florets 1 to 3 centimeters long around a center of protruding yellowish to purplish brown disc florets.

The fruit is an achene 5 to 7 millimeters long, with no pappus. It blooms from February to June, and attracts butterflies, bees, and other insects.

== Uses ==
It is a host plant for the larvae of the Bay checkerspot butterfly, a threatened species.

Encelia californica is cultivated by specialty nurseries as an ornamental plant, for use in native plant and wildlife gardens, and natural landscaping projects. It is drought tolerant but not frost tolerant, and needs full sun.
