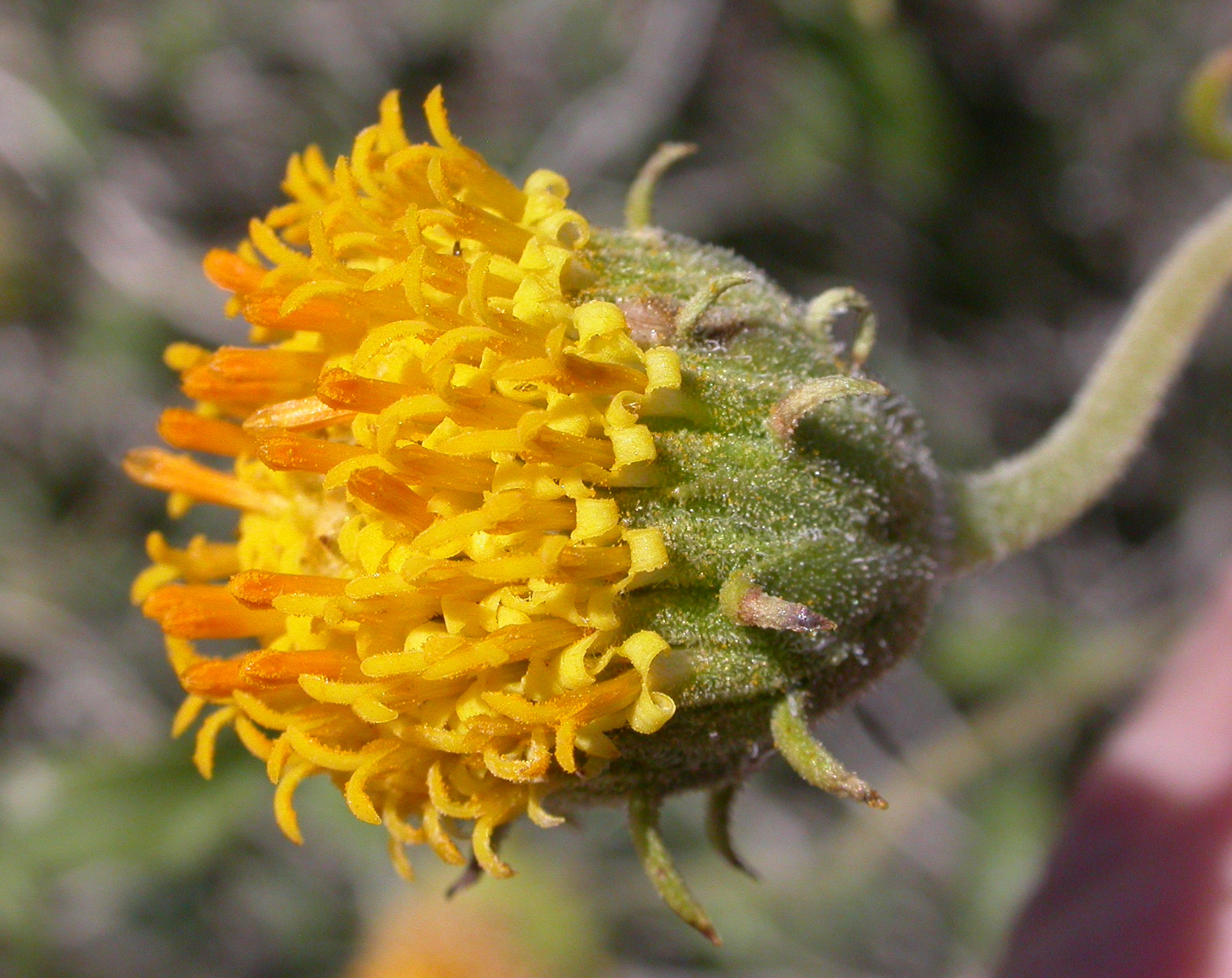

Conservation status
- Secure (NatureServe)

Scientific classification
- Kingdom: Plantae
- Clade: Tracheophytes
- Clade: Angiosperms
- Clade: Eudicots
- Clade: Asterids
- Order: Asterales
- Family: Asteraceae
- Genus: Encelia
- Species: E. frutescens

Binomial name
- Encelia frutescens A.Gray

= Encelia frutescens =

Species of flowering plant

Encelia frutescens is a species of flowering plant in the family Asteraceae known by the common names button brittlebush and bush encelia.

== Distribution ==
This is a plant of the deserts in the Southwestern United States, especially the Mojave Desert in California, and also Nevada and Arizona.

== Description ==
The Encelia frutescens flower heads usually, but not always, lack ray florets and are composed of only a disc packed with disc florets. The leaves are rough and hairy. The flat, light fruits are wind dispersed. This is an occasional food plant for the desert tortoise. It is one of the first plants to colonize disturbed or burned sites.

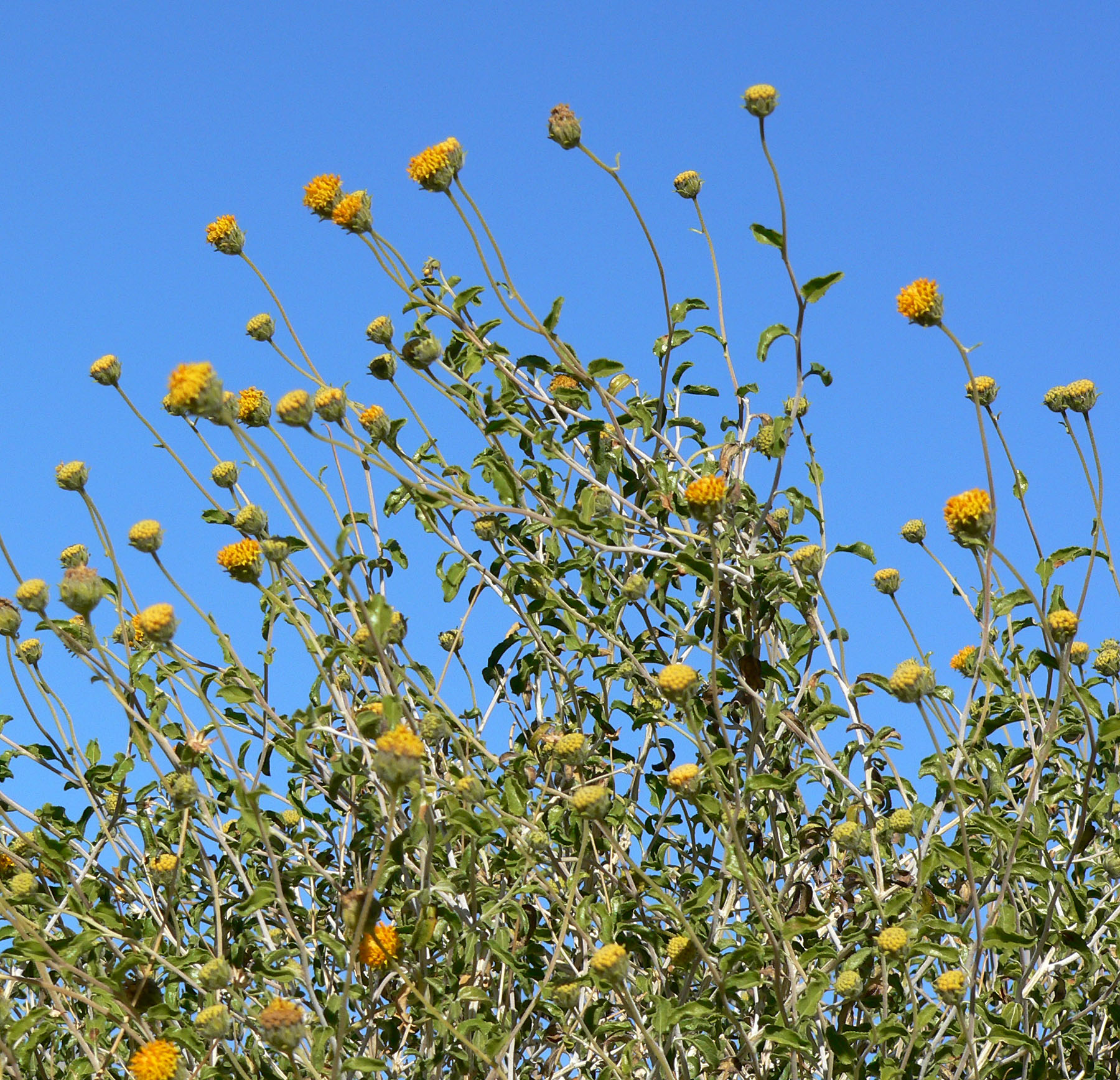
Blooming in the Dead Mountains, Mojave Desert, California.
