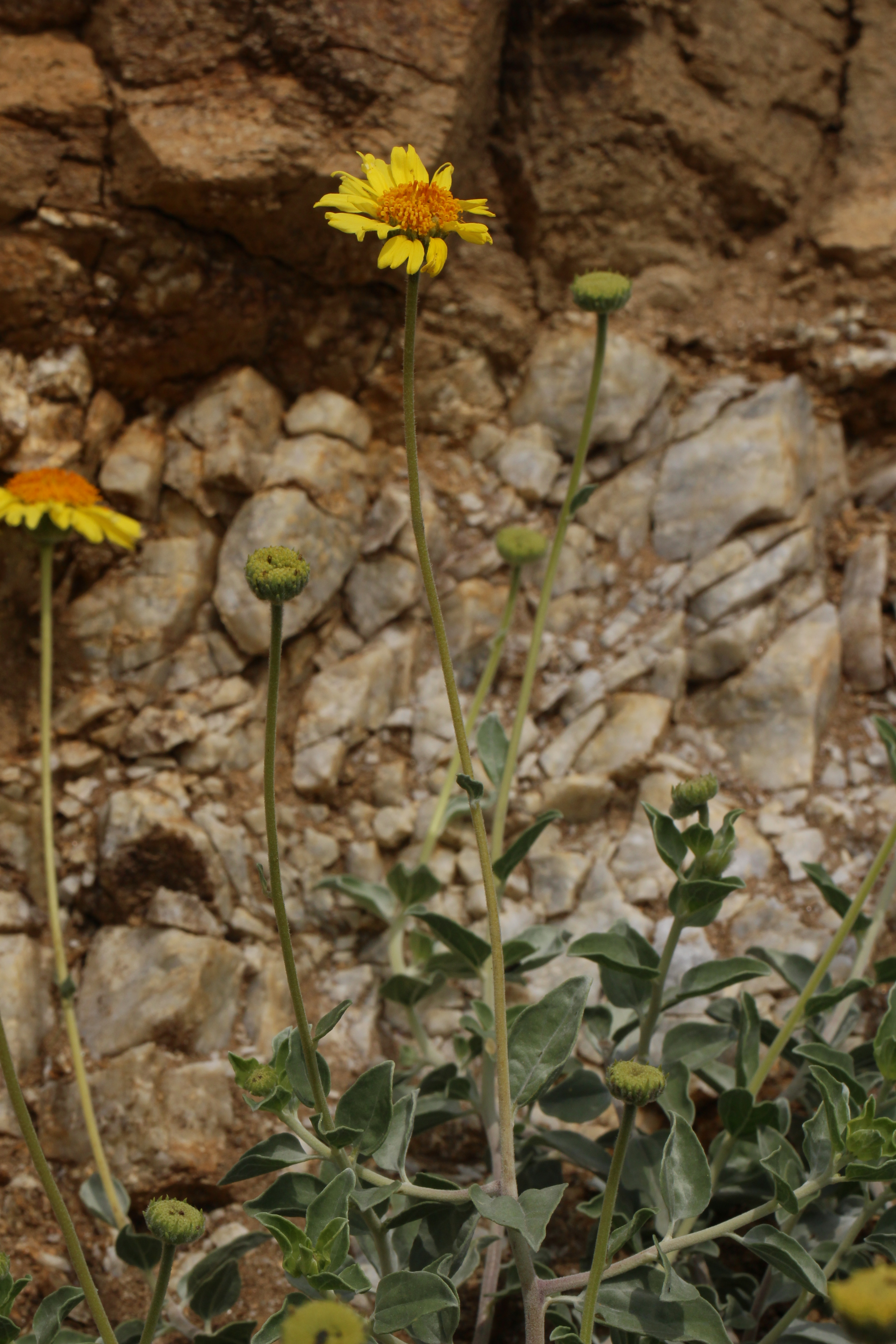

Scientific classification
- Kingdom: Plantae
- Clade: Tracheophytes
- Clade: Angiosperms
- Clade: Eudicots
- Clade: Asterids
- Order: Asterales
- Family: Asteraceae
- Genus: Encelia
- Species: E. actoni

Binomial name
- Encelia actoni Elmer

Synonyms
- Encelia virginensis var. actonii; Encelia virginensis subsp. actonii

= Encelia actoni =

Species of flowering plant

Encelia actoni, also known by the common names Acton brittlebush and Acton encelia, is a species of flowering plant in the family Asteraceae.

It is sometimes misspelled Encelia actonii.

== Distribution and habitat ==
The plant is native to southern California and neighboring areas of Nevada in the U.S. and Baja California in México. It grows in various types of open habitat, including deserts, chaparral, and grasslands.

It is found in the Mojave Desert, Sonoran Deserts, Peninsular Ranges, Transverse Ranges, San Joaquin Valley, and southern Sierra Nevada.

The species was named for the community of Acton in Southern California, located in an ecotone of the Mojave Desert ecoregion and of the montane chaparral and woodlands in the San Gabriel Mountains.

== Description ==
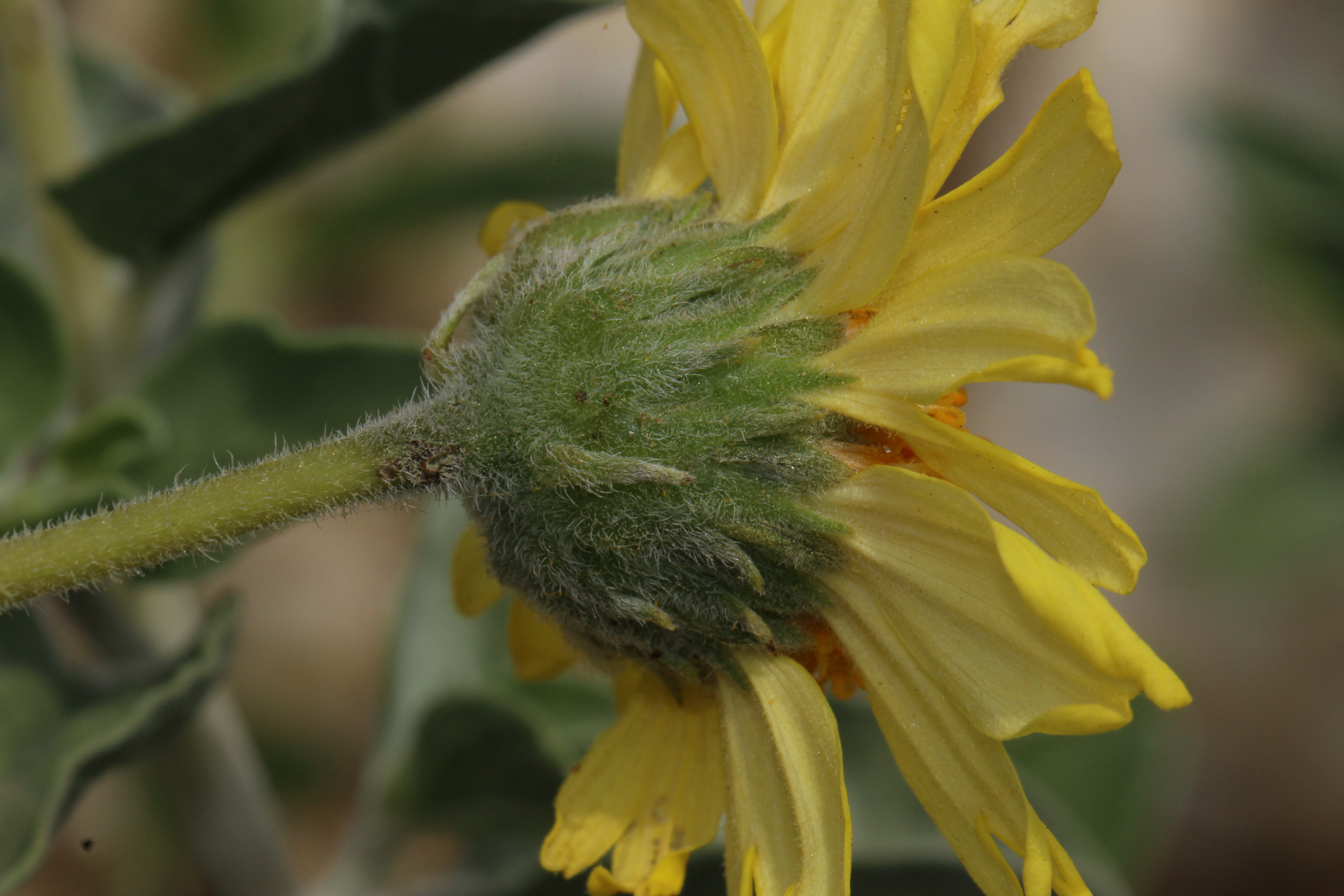
The peduncle is covered with short fine hairs (canescent); the involucre is 8–14 millimetres (0.31–0.55 in).

Encelia actoni is a multi−branched perennial shrub, reaching 1–4 feet (0.30–1.22 m) in height. The branches are lined with oval to roughly triangular leaves a few centimeters long, that are gray-green and woolly in texture.

The inflorescence is a solitary daisylike flower head 1–2 inches (2.5–5.1 cm) in diameter, on a tall, erect peduncle. The head has a center of many yellow disc florets surrounded by up to 25 yellow ray florets. It blooms in the Spring.

The fruit is an achene about half a centimeter long, usually lacking a pappus. It reseeds well.

== Cultivation ==
Encelia actoni is cultivated as an ornamental plant for drought tolerant and wildlife gardens, natural landscaping design, and habitat restoration projects. It needs sun and after the first summer, very limited to no supplemental irrigation.

It is a honey plant, supporting diverse pollinators. The plant has a low fuel load, and so has fire retardant qualities in wildfire zones.
