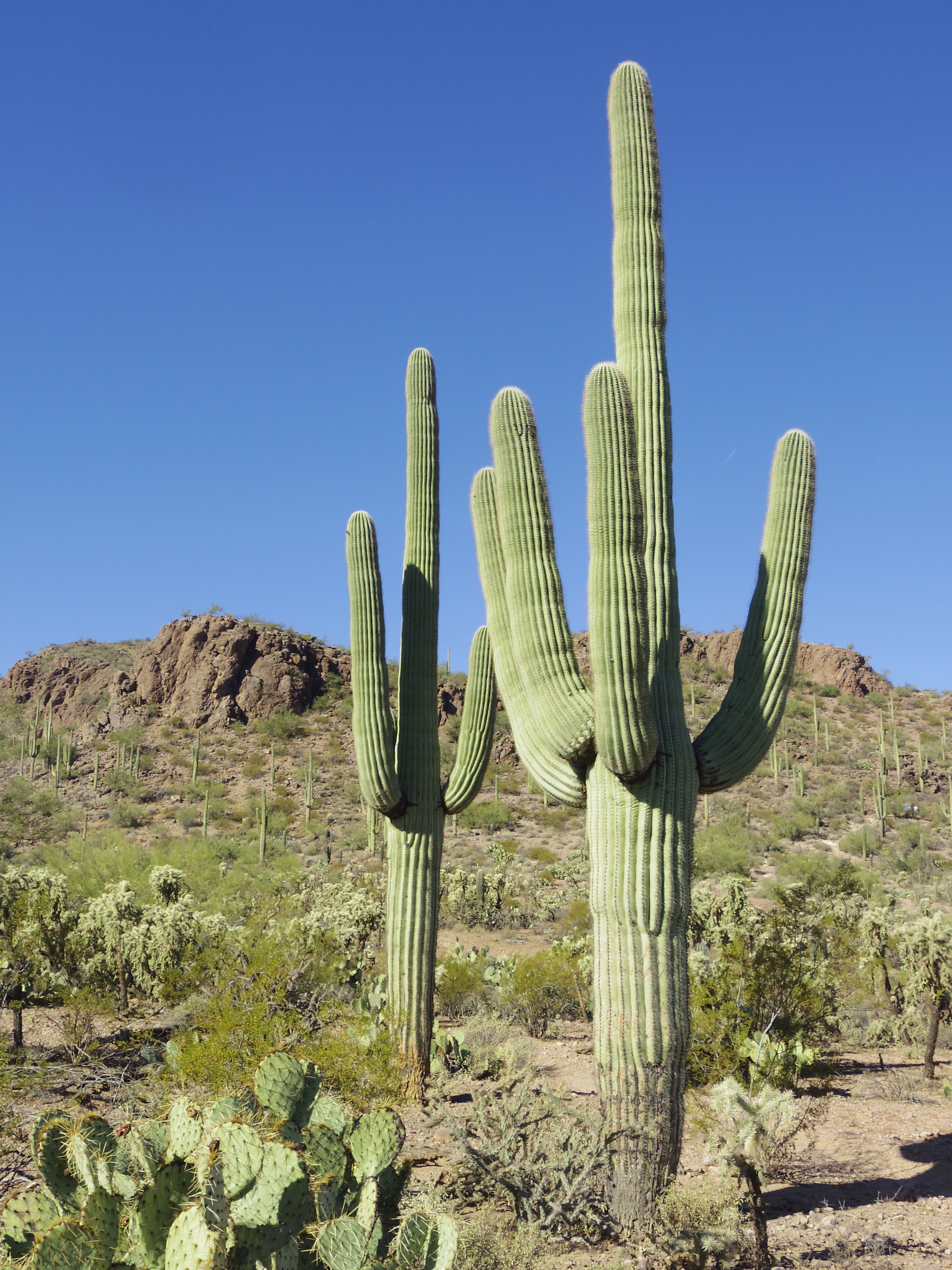

Conservation status
- Least Concern (IUCN 3.1)

Scientific classification
- Kingdom: Plantae
- Clade: Tracheophytes
- Clade: Angiosperms
- Clade: Eudicots
- Order: Caryophyllales
- Family: Cactaceae
- Subfamily: Cactoideae
- Tribe: Echinocereeae
- Genus: Carnegiea; Britton & Rose
- Species: C. gigantea

Binomial name
- Carnegiea gigantea (Engelm.) Britton & Rose
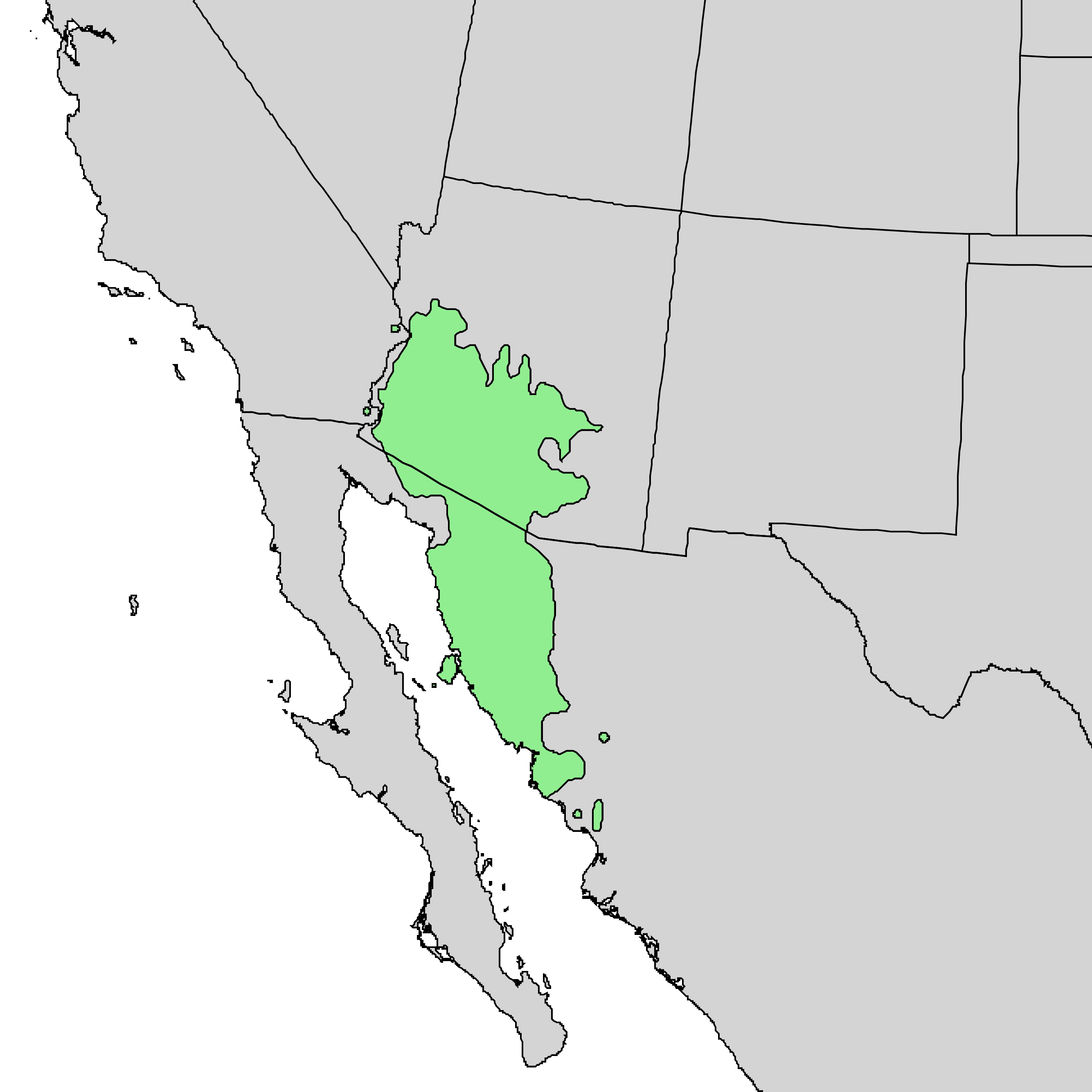
- Natural range of Carnegiea gigantea

Synonyms
- Cereus giganteus Engelm.; Pilocereus engelmannii Lem.; Pilocereus giganteus Rumpler

= Saguaro =

Saguaro cactus

Species of cactus in the Sonoran Desert

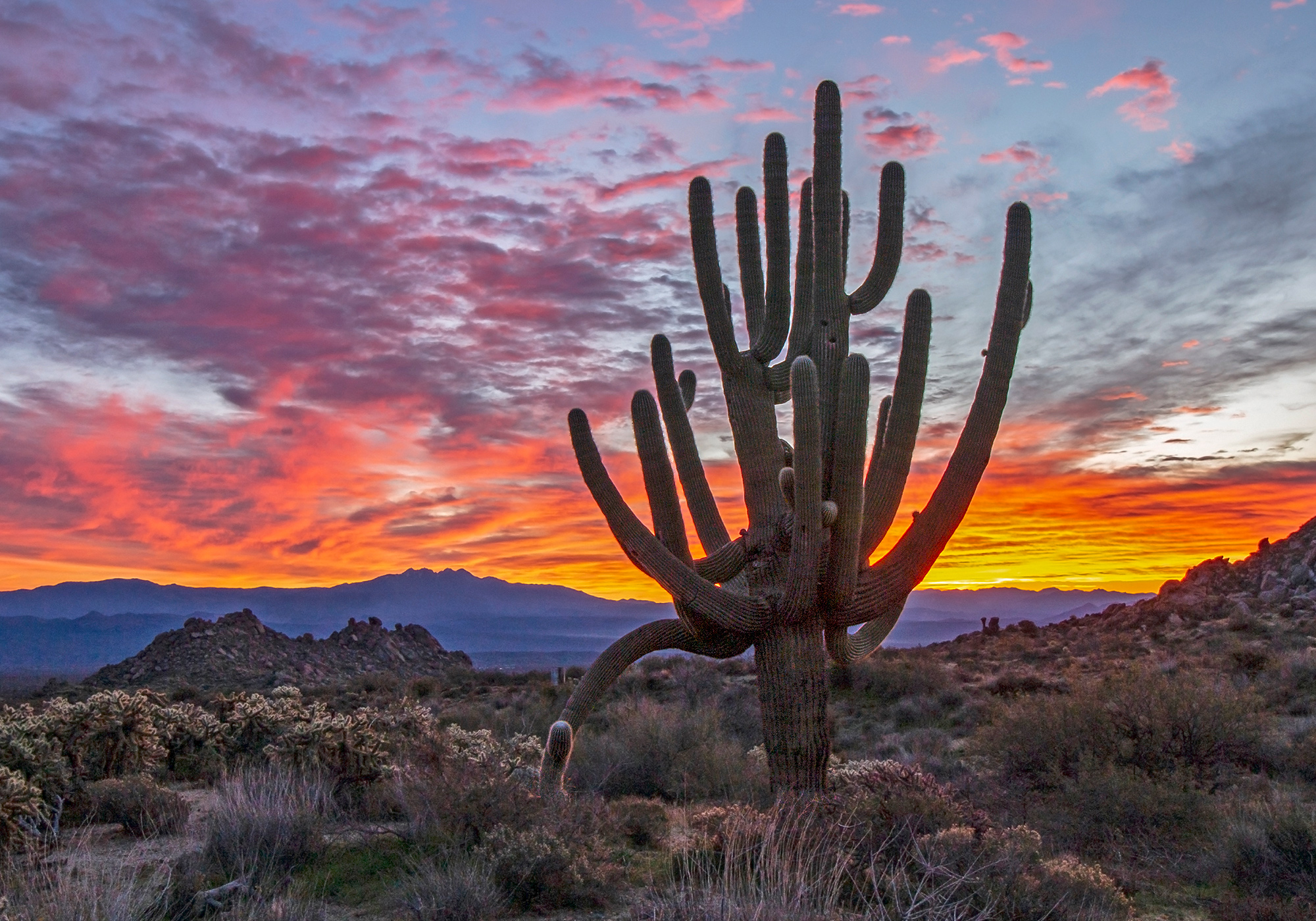
Old growth saguaro

The saguaro (/səˈ(ɡ)wɑːroʊ/ sə-(G)WAR-oh, Spanish: [saˈɣwaɾo]; Carnegiea gigantea) is a tree-like cactus species in the monotypic genus Carnegiea that can grow to be over 12 meters (40 feet) tall. It is native to the Sonoran Desert in Arizona, the Mexican state of Sonora, and the Whipple Mountains and Imperial County areas of California. Saguaro typically grow at elevations ranging from sea level to 4,500 feet (1,400 m), although they may be found at up to 5,000 feet (1,500 m). The saguaro blossom is the state wildflower of Arizona. Its scientific name is given in honor of Andrew Carnegie. In 1933, Saguaro National Park, near Tucson, Arizona, was designated to help protect this species and its habitat.

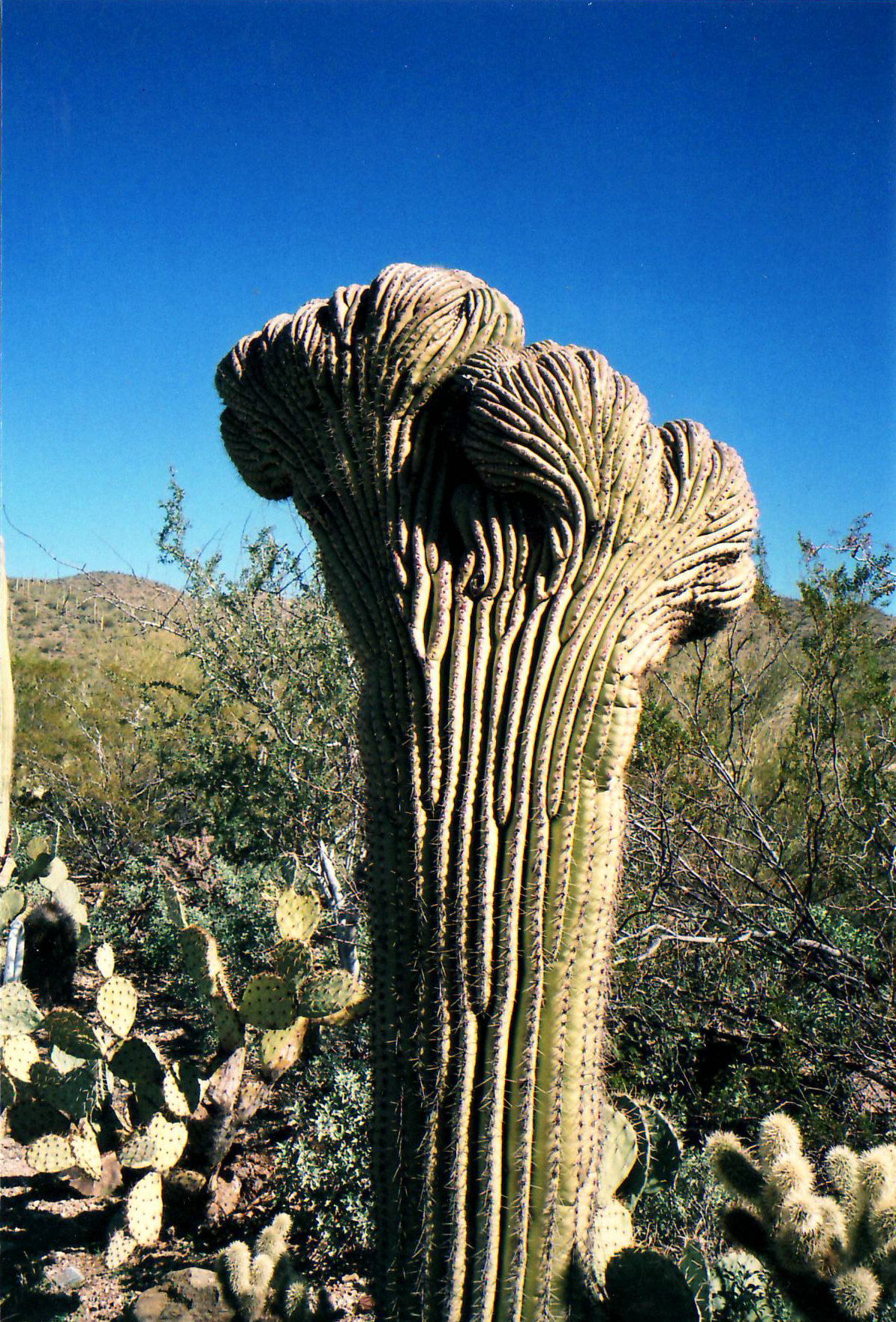
Some saguaros are cristate or "crested" due to fasciation.

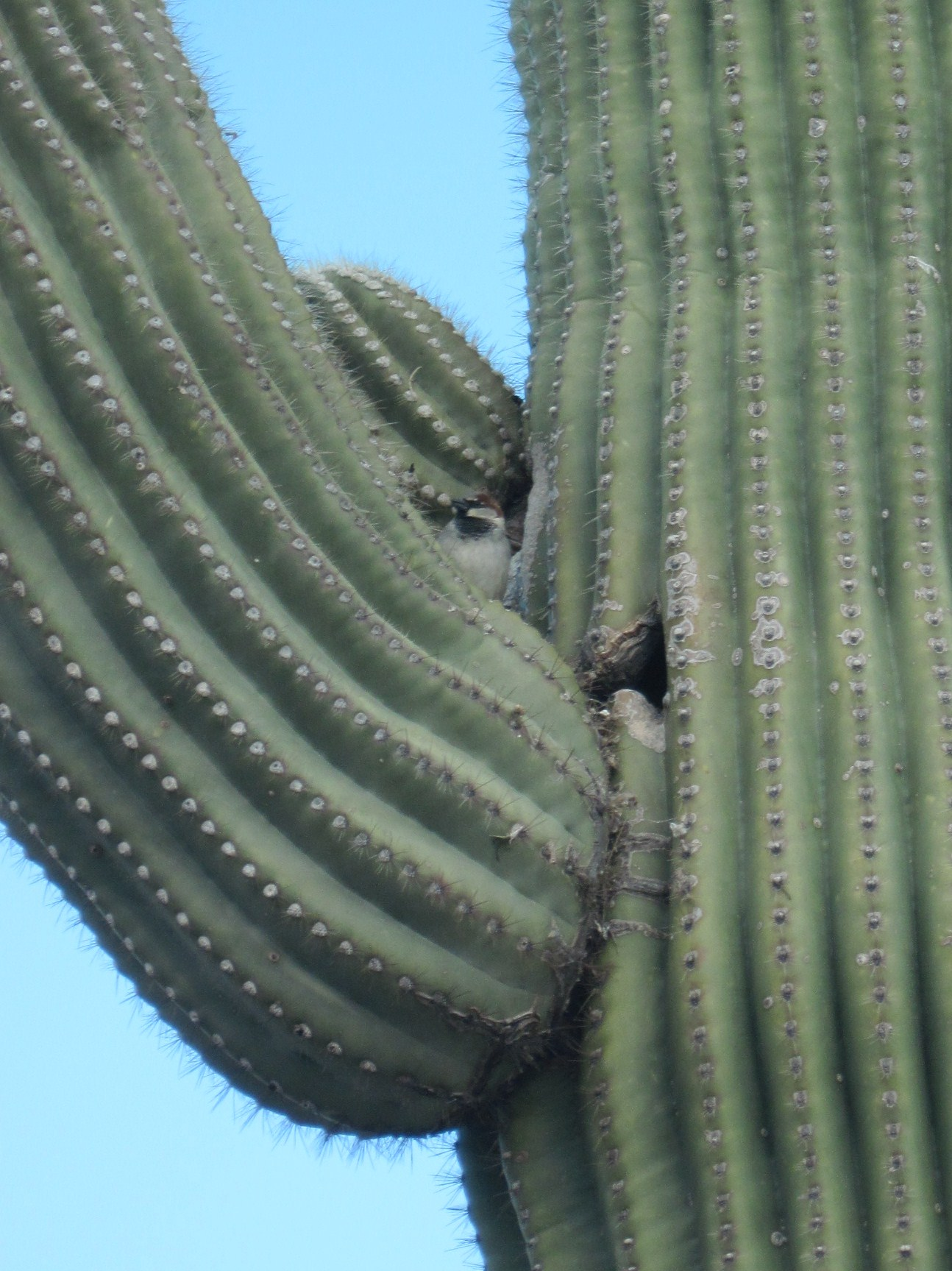
A house sparrow nesting on a saguaro cactus

Saguaros have a relatively long lifespan, often exceeding 150 years. They may grow their first side arm around 75–100 years of age, but some never grow any arms. Arms are developed to increase the plant's reproductive capacity, as more apices lead to more flowers and fruit. A saguaro can absorb and store considerable amounts of rainwater, visibly expanding in the process, while slowly using the stored water as needed. This characteristic enables the saguaro to survive during periods of drought. It is a keystone species, and provides food and habitat to a large number of species.

Saguaros have been a source of food and shelter for humans for thousands of years. Their sweet red fleshed fruits are turned into syrup by native peoples, such as the Tohono Oʼodham and Pima. Their ribs are used as building materials in the wood-poor deserts. The saguaro cactus is a common image in Mexican and Arizonan culture, and American Southwest films.

== Description ==
The saguaro is a columnar cactus that grows branches, usually referred to as arms. Over 50 arms may grow on one plant, with one specimen having 78 arms. Saguaros grow from 3–16 m (10–52 ft) tall, and up to 75 cm (30 in) in diameter. They are slow growing, and routinely live 150 to 200 years. They are the largest cactus in the United States.

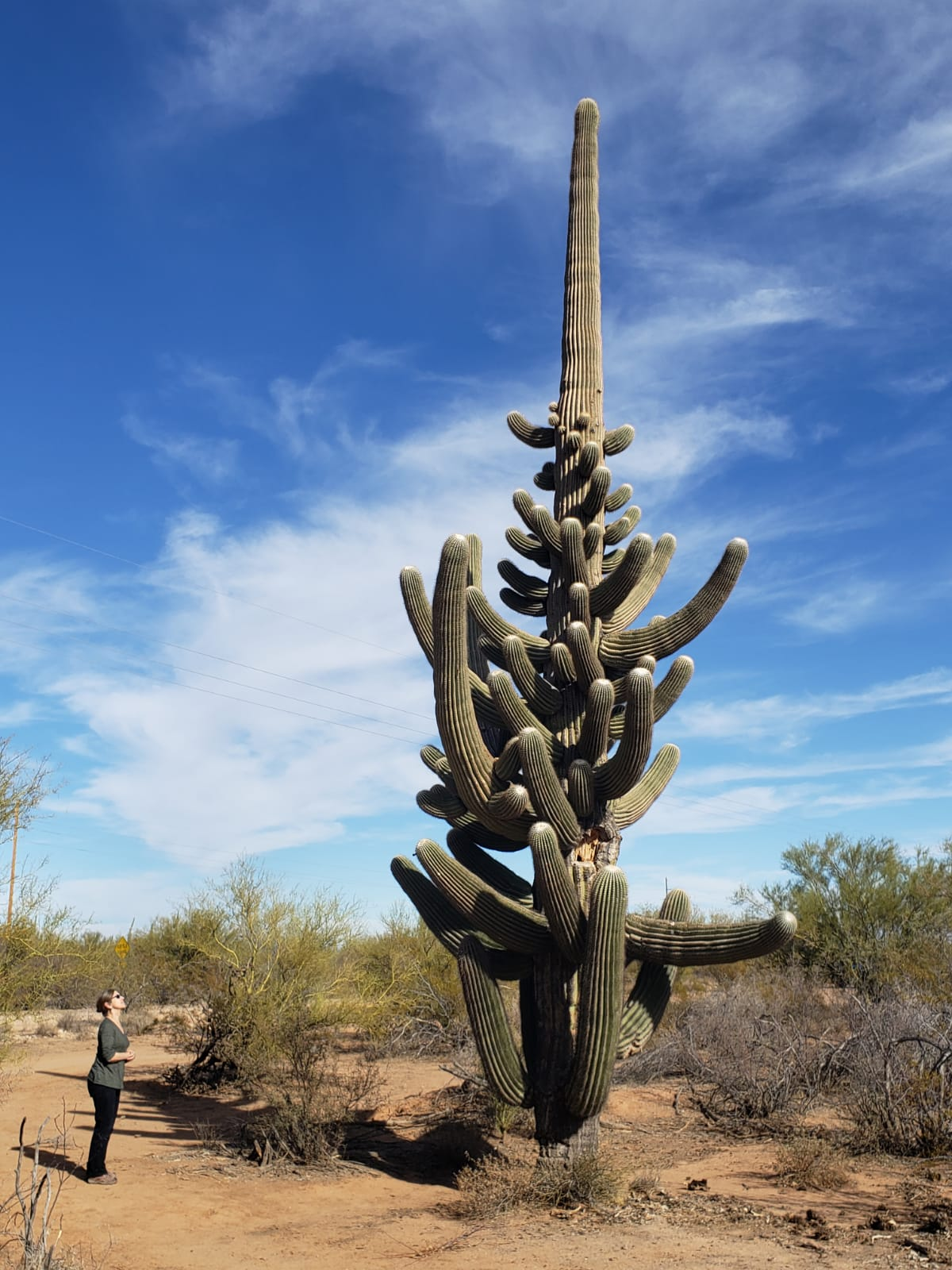
A many-armed saguaro in Tucson, AZ. Woman for scale.

The growth rate of this cactus is strongly dependent on precipitation; saguaros in drier western Arizona grow only half as fast as those in and around Tucson. Saguaros grow slowly from seed, and may be only 6.4 mm (1/4 in) tall after two years. Cuttings rarely root, and when they do, they do not go through the juvenile growth phase, which gives a different appearance. Since 2014, the National Register of Champion Trees listed the largest known living saguaro in the United States in Maricopa County, Arizona, measuring 13.8 m (45 ft 3 in) high with a girth of 3.1 m (10 ft 2 in); it has an estimated age of 200 years and survived damage in the 2005 Cave Creek Complex Fire. The tallest saguaro ever measured was an armless specimen found near Cave Creek, Arizona. It was 78 ft (23.8 m) in height before it was toppled in 1986 by a windstorm. Saguaros are stem succulents and can hold large amounts of water; when rain is plentiful and the saguaro is fully hydrated, it can weigh between 1,500 and 2,200 kg (3,200 and 4,800 lb).

Estimated age of saguaros based on their height
Height	Age (years)
0.5 feet (0.15 m)	9
1.0 foot (0.30 m)	13
5.0 feet (1.5 m)	27
10.0 feet (3.0 m)	41
20.0 feet (6.1 m)	83
25.0 feet (7.6 m)	107
30.0 feet (9.1 m)	131
35.0 feet (10.7 m)	157

Saguaros have a very large root network that can extend up to 30 m (100 ft), and long taproots of up to 1 m (3 ft 3 in) deep.

Saguaros may take between 20 and 50 years to reach a height of 1 m (3 ft 3 in). Individual stomatal guard cells and medulla cells can live and function for as long as 150 years, possibly the longest living of all cells, except nerve cells in some tortoises.

As a cactus, it uses crassulacean acid metabolism photosynthesis, which confers high levels of water-use efficiency. This allows the saguaro to transpire only at night, minimizing daytime water loss.

A saguaro without arms is called a "spear".

Some saguaros grow in rare formations called a cristate, or "crested" saguaro. This growth formation is believed to be found in one in roughly 10,000 saguaros, with 2,743 crested saguaros documented as of 2020. The crest formation, caused by fasciation, creates a seam of abnormal growth along the top or top of the arm of the saguaro.

=== Ribs ===
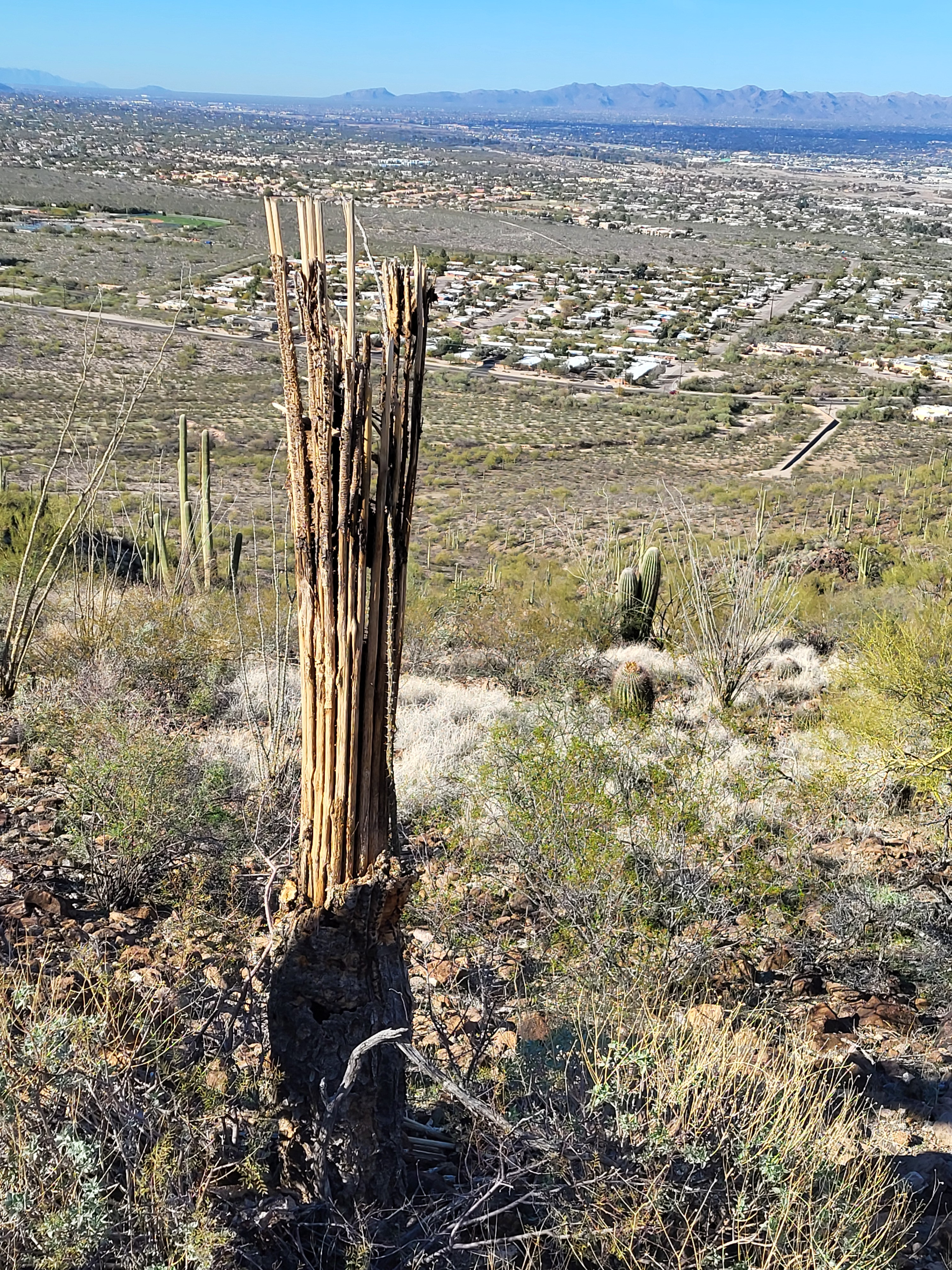
Ribs of a dead Saguaro outside Tucson, Arizona. These cactus ribs are about 2m tall.

Inside the saguaro, many "ribs" of wood form something like a skeleton, with the individual ribs being as long as the cactus itself and up to a few centimeters in diameter. The rib wood itself is also relatively dense, with dry ribs having a solid density around 430 kg/m^{3} (27 lb/cu ft), which made the ribs useful to indigenous peoples as a building material. While the ribs of dead plants are not protected by the Arizona native plant law, the Arizona Department of Agriculture has released a memo discussing when written permission is needed before harvesting them because of the importance of the decomposition of cactus remains in maintaining desert soil fertility.

The composition of the ribs is similar to that of hardwoods.

=== Spines ===
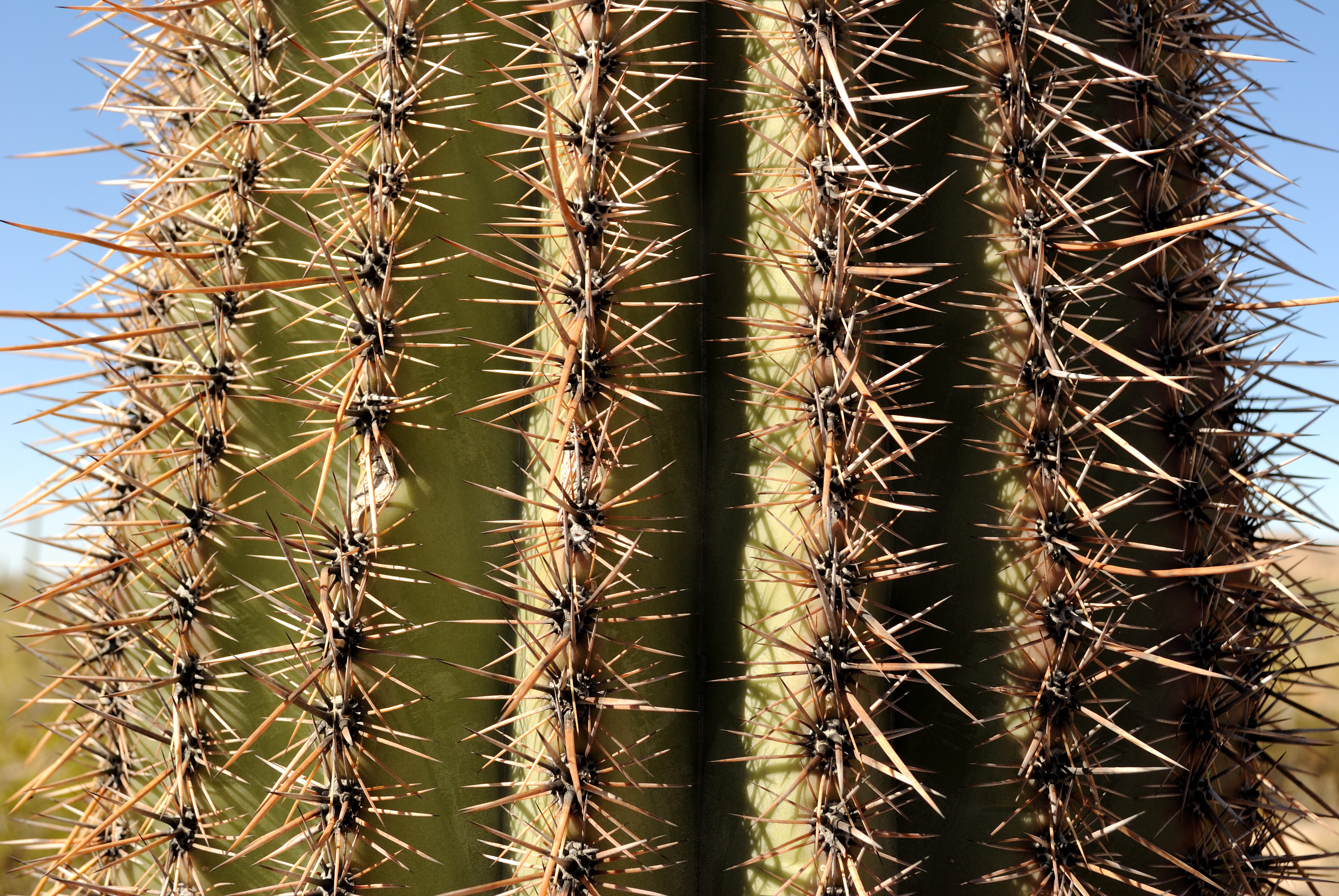
Saguaro spines

The spines on a saguaro are extremely sharp and can grow to 7 cm (3 in) long, and up to 1 mm (1/32 in) per day. When held up to the light or bisected, alternating light and dark bands transverse to the long axis of spines are visible. These bands have been correlated to daily growth. In columnar cacti, spines almost always grow in areoles that originate at the apex of the plant. A spine stops growing in its first season. Areoles are moved to the side and the apex continues to grow upward. Thus, older spines are toward the base of a columnar cactus and newer spines are near the apex. A 2007 study examined the relationship of carbon and oxygen isotope ratios in the tissues of spines of an individual to its climate and photosynthetic history (acanthochronology).

The spines may cause significant injury to animals; one paper reported that a bighorn sheep skull had been penetrated by a saguaro spine after the sheep collided with a saguaro. They can also cause severe injury to humans, being as sharp and nearly as strong as steel needles. Their long, unbarbed nature means that partially embedded spines can be easily removed, but their relative length can complicate injuries. The spines can puncture deeply, and if broken off, can leave splinters of spine deep in the tissue that can be difficult to remove. Fully embedded spikes are also difficult to remove. Such injuries do not usually result in infection, though, as the cactus spines are generally aseptic. However, spines that remain embedded may cause inflammatory granuloma.

=== Flowers ===
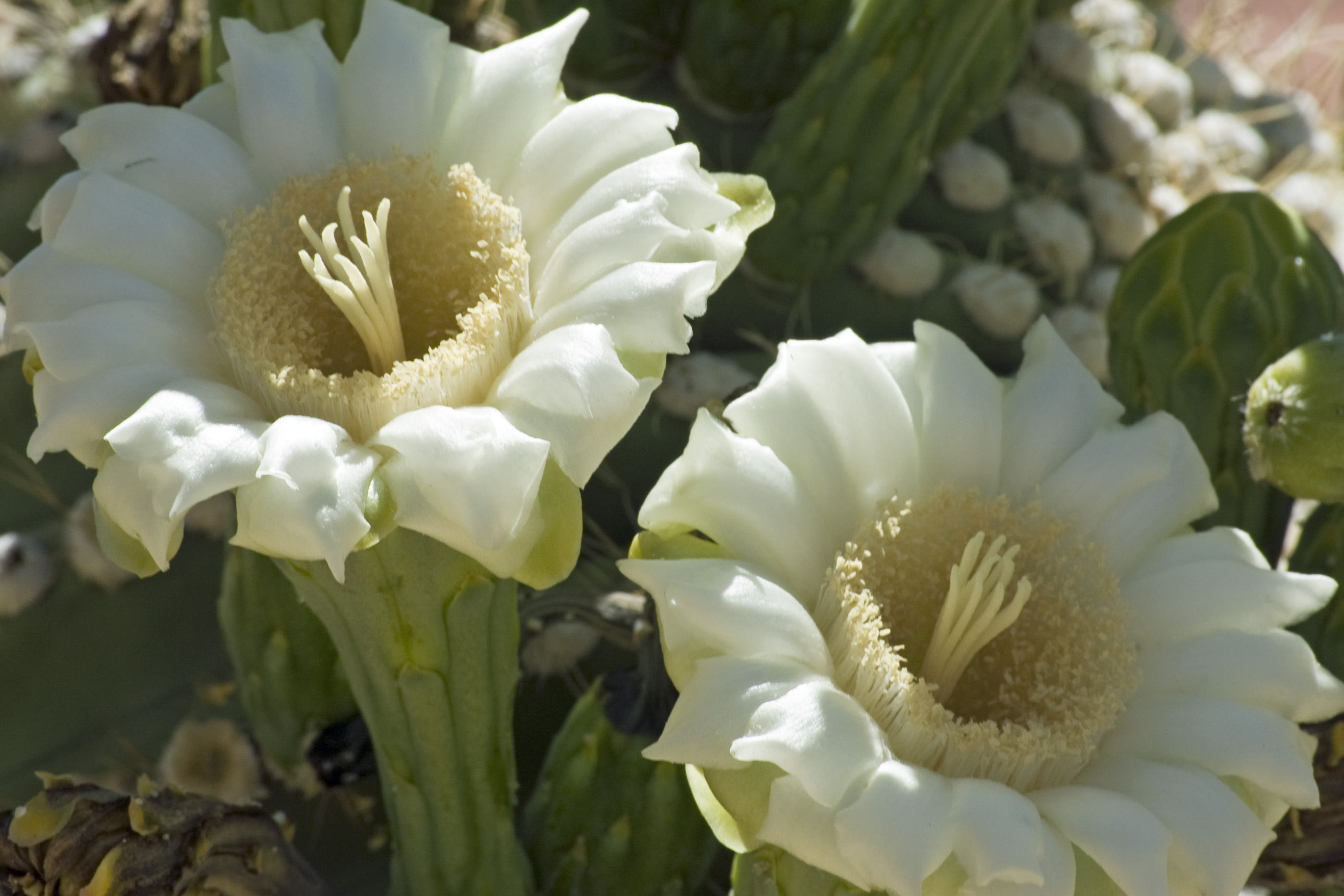
Saguaro flowers

The white, waxy flowers appear in April through June, opening well after sunset and closing in midafternoon. They continue to produce nectar after sunrise. Flowers are self-incompatible, thus requiring cross-pollination. Large quantities of pollen are required for complete pollination because many ovules are present. This pollen is produced by the extremely numerous stamens, which in one notable case totaled 3482 in a single flower. A well-pollinated fruit contains several thousand tiny seeds.

Pollination is considered relatively generalized in that multiple species can produce effective pollination when some populations are excluded. Main pollinators are honey bees, bats, and white-winged doves. In most, but not all studies, diurnal pollinators contributed more than nocturnal ones. Honey bees were the greatest contributors. Other diurnal pollinators are birds such as Costa's hummingbird, the black-chinned hummingbird, the broad-billed hummingbird, the hooded oriole, Scott's oriole, the Gila woodpecker, the gilded flicker, the verdin, and the house finch according to studies that examined the relative contributions of diurnal pollinators.

The primary nocturnal pollinator is the lesser long-nosed bat, feeding on the nectar. Several floral characteristics are geared toward bat pollination (chiropterophily): nocturnal opening of the flowers, nocturnal maturation of pollen, very rich nectar, position high above ground, durable blooms that can withstand a bat's weight, and fragrance emitted at night. Claw marks on the flower indicate pollination by a bat.

Flowers grow 8.6–12.4 cm (3.4–4.9 in) long, and are open for less than 24 hours. Since they form only at the top of the plant and the tips of branches, saguaros growing numerous branches is reproductively advantageous. Flowers open sequentially, with plants averaging four flowers open per day over a bloom period lasting a month. In Southern Arizona, saguaros begin flowering around May 3 and peak on June 4. A decline in bat populations causes more daytime flower openings, which favors other pollinators.

=== Fruit ===
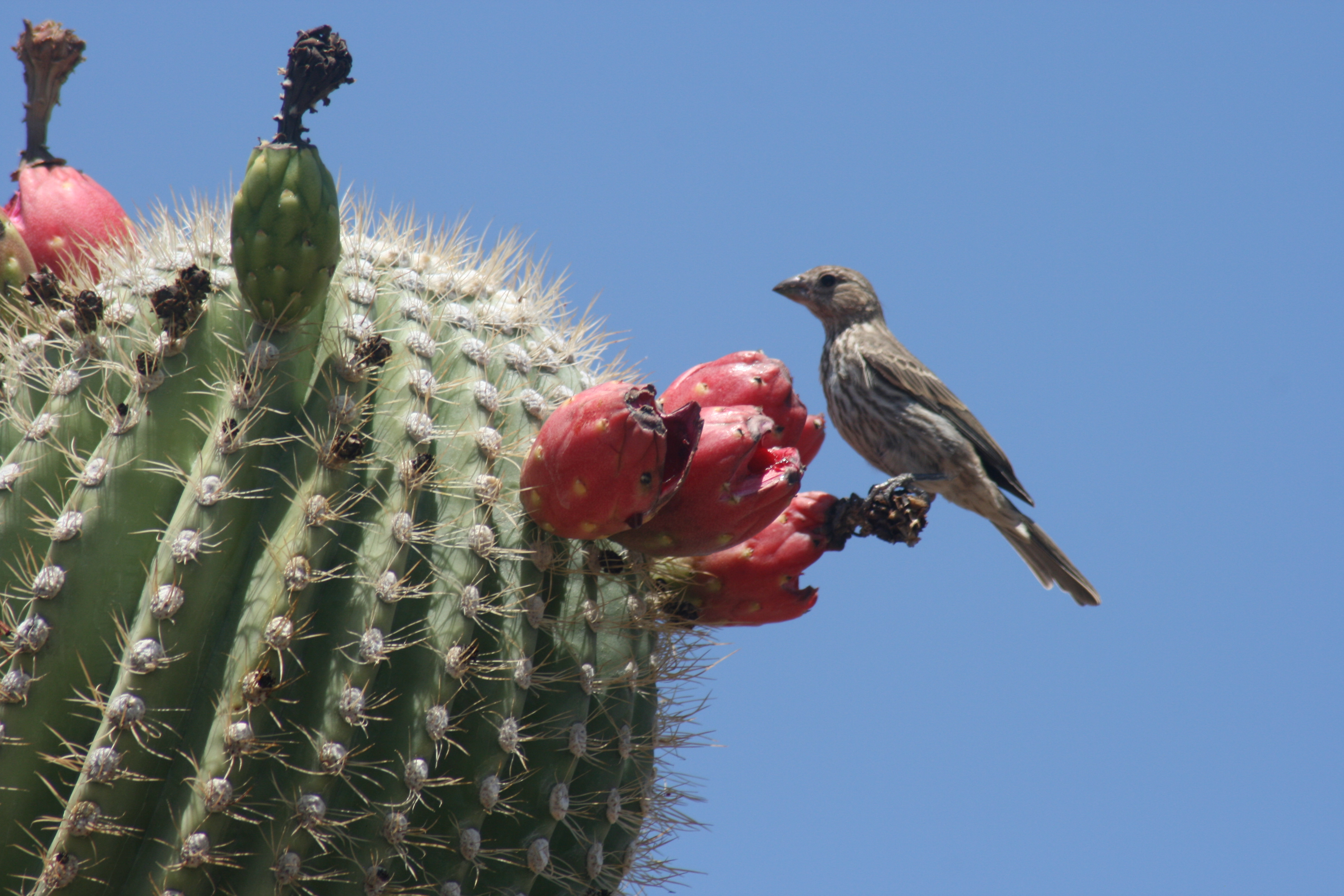
House finch perched atop fruits at the tip of a saguaro

The ruby red fruits are 6 to 9 cm (2 1/2 to 3 1/2 in) long and ripen in June, each containing around 2000 seeds, plus sweet, fleshy connective tissue.

The fruits are often out of reach and are harvested using a pole (made of two or three saguaro ribs) 4.5 to 9 m (15 to 30 ft) long, to the end of which cross-pieces, which can be made of saguaro rib, catclaw, or creosote bush, are attached. This pole is used to hook the fruits or knock them free.

Saguaro seeds are small and short-lived. Although they germinate easily, predation and lack of moisture prevent all but about 1% of seeds from successful germination. Seeds must wait 12–14 months before germination; lack of water during this period drastically reduces seedling survival. The existence of nurse plants is critical to seedling establishment. Palo verde trees and triangle bursage represent important nurse species. They act by regulating temperature extremes, increasing soil nutrients, and reducing evapotranspiration, among others. While nurse plants reduce summer temperature maxima by as much as 18 °C (32 °F), they are more important in raising winter minimum temperatures, as extended frosts limit the range of saguaros.

Native Americans of the Southwest would make bread from the ground seeds of saguaro.

=== Genome ===
The saguaro genome is around 1 billion base pairs long. Sequencing has revealed that the genome of the saguaro's chloroplast is the smallest known among nonparasitic flowering plants. Like several other highly specialized plant taxa, such as the carnivorous Genlisea and parasitic Cuscuta, the saguaro has lost the ndh plastid genes, which codes for production of NADPH dehydrogenase pathway, but unlike those taxa, the saguaro remains fully autotrophic; i.e. it does not eat or steal part of its food. The saguaro is remarkable for the scale and completeness of gene loss; essentially no traces of the 11 ndh genes remain in the plastid. The genes appear to have been copied to the nuclear DNA and mitochondrial DNA, but those copies are non-functional. How the saguaro thrives in a high stress environment without working copies of this fairly important gene remains unknown, but it is possible that the functions of the ndh genes have been taken on by another pathway.

== Taxonomy ==
Carnegiea gigantea is the only species in the monotypic genus Carnegiea. The first description of the species was made by William H. Emory in 1848, during his surveys along the pre-Gadsden Purchase United States-Mexican border. This description allowed cactus expert George Engelmann to formally name it, during his work on the United States and Mexican Boundary Survey, published in 1859. The next major taxonomic treatment came from The Cactaceae, the seminal work on cactus by Nathaniel Lord Britton and Joseph Nelson Rose.

What tribe Carnegiea gigantea belongs to is a matter of taxonomic dispute. A molecular analysis of the cactus family in 2010 placed the saguaro in the Echinocereinae. The ARS Germplasm Resources Information Network places it in the Echinocereeae.

The generic name honors businessman and philanthropist Andrew Carnegie. The specific epithet gigantea refers to its formidable size.

== Etymology ==
The genus name Carnegiea honors industrialist Andrew Carnegie (1835-1919), whose Carnegie Institution established the Desert Botanical Laboratory in Tucson in 1903. The species epithet gigantea derives from the Greek root for giant, giga, due to the massive size of the cactus.

=== Indigenous Names ===
The O'odham peoples of the Northern Sonoran Desert know this species as Ha:san in their native language. Stemming from this native origin, it is thought that the term "Saguaro" is a Hispanized version brought on later by Spanish settlers.

== Distribution and habitat ==
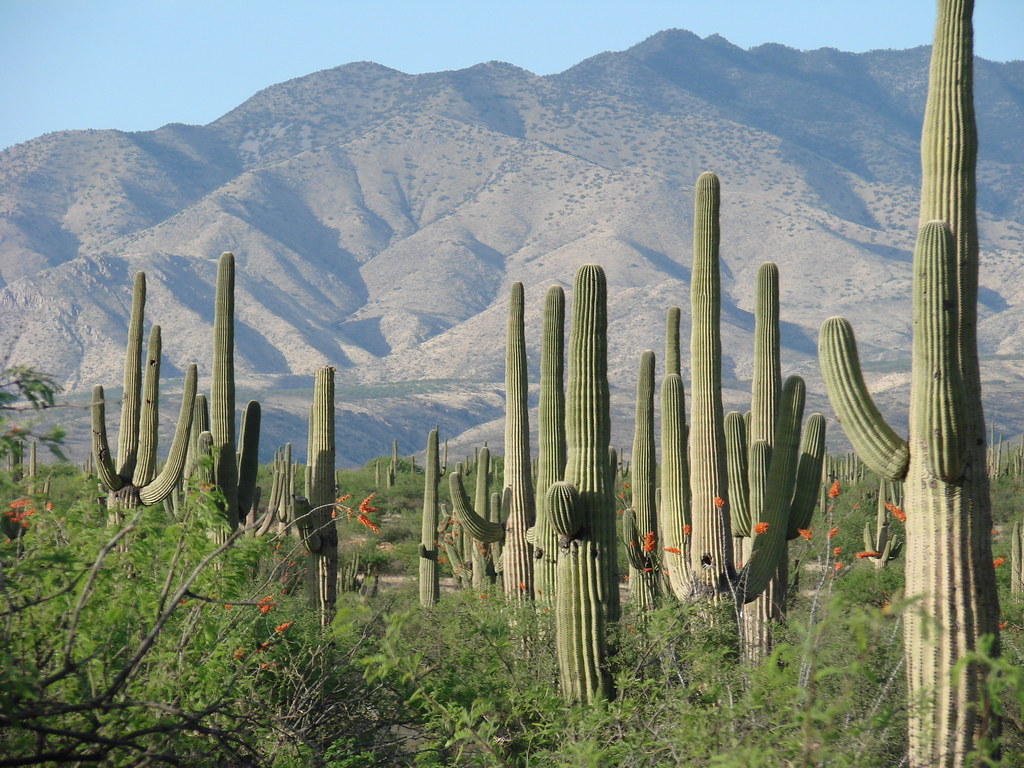
Saguaros in their natural habitat in Ímuris, Sonora.

The Saguaro is endemic to the Sonoran Desert and is found primarily in western Sonora in Mexico, and in western Arizona in the US. There are only 30 known wild saguaros found in southeastern California. Elevation is a limiting factor to its environment, as the saguaro is sensitive to extended frost or cold temperatures. No confirmed specimens of wild saguaros have been found anywhere in Nevada, New Mexico, Texas, Colorado, Utah, nor in the high deserts of northern Arizona. The northern limits of their range are the Hualapai Mountains in Arizona. They are the northernmost columnar cacti in the Americas. The range of the saguaro is strongly correlated with low minimum temperature stress and low minimum VPD.

== Ecology ==
The saguaro is a keystone species, and provides food, shelter, and protection to hundreds of other species. Every stage of the saguaro's life sustains a significant number of species, from seedling to after its death.

=== As food for wildlife ===
The saguaro provides voluminous amounts of pollen, nectar, and fruits. The fruits are eaten by the white-winged dove and ants, so that seeds rarely escape to germinate. White-winged doves are important pollinators, visiting blooms more often than any other bird species. For desert white-winged doves, 60% or more of their diet is saguaro-based. Their breeding cycle coincides with that of the saguaro blooming.

=== Nests ===
Gila woodpeckers and gilded flickers create holes in the cactus to make nests, which are later used by other birds, such as elf owls, purple martins, and house finches. (Note: Although they do not use them immediately, waiting first for the sap to harden, Gila woodpeckers excavate cavities in cacti and trees as nesting sites. Females typically lay two broods a year of three to five eggs, which incubate for 14 days. Once abandoned, the cavities are occupied by reptiles, rodents, and small birds like kestrels, elf owls, flycatchers, and wrens. In the desert, the woodpeckers perform the important ecological function of removing unhealthy flesh from the saguaro cactus. Some insects on which it feeds carry diseases, harmless to the bird, which damages the cactus and leaves discolorations. The marks signal larvae to the bird, and as it excavates the insects, it also cuts away the diseased tissue. As the sap hardens, the cactus is healed, and the excavation becomes a convenient nesting site. — Nature Conservancy) (Note: Cavities in saguaro cactuses in the Southwest are common. Both gilded flickers and Gila woodpeckers make these cavities for nesting, but they often choose different locations on the cactus. The stouter bills of the gilded flickers allow them to cut cavities through the wooden ribs near the top of the cactus where the ribs converge. Gila woodpeckers stay at midlevel on the cactus where the ribs are separated enough to cut a cavity between them. Cavities in saguaros are cut out by these birds the year before they are inhabited. The excavated cactus secretes a fluid that hardens into a scab, thus preventing water loss, which could kill the cactus, as well as waterproofing the inside of the nest cavity. — Elbroch, Marks & Boretos (2001), p. 311) Gilded flickers excavate larger holes higher on the stem compared to Gila woodpeckers. The resulting nest cavity is deep, and the parents and young are entirely hidden from view. The saguaro creates callus tissue on the wound. When the saguaro dies and its soft flesh rots, the callus remains as a so-called saguaro boot, which was used by natives for storage.

Gila woodpeckers (Melanerpes uropygialis) create new nest holes each season rather than reuse the old ones, leaving convenient nest holes for other birds, such as elf owls, tyrant flycatchers, and wrens. In recent years, early-breeding aggressive non-native birds have taken over the nests, to the detriment of elf owls that breed and nest later. In 2020, a bald eagle was found nesting in a saguaro for the first time since 1937.

=== Carbon sequestration ===
Saguaros transform significant amounts of the carbon in carbon dioxide into the mineral calcium carbonate when they die. Through the formation of a mineral, cacti transfer carbon from the earth's biological cycle to its geological cycle. This form of carbon sequestration is a terrestrial equivalent to oceanic sequestration by corals and shellfish.

== Conservation ==
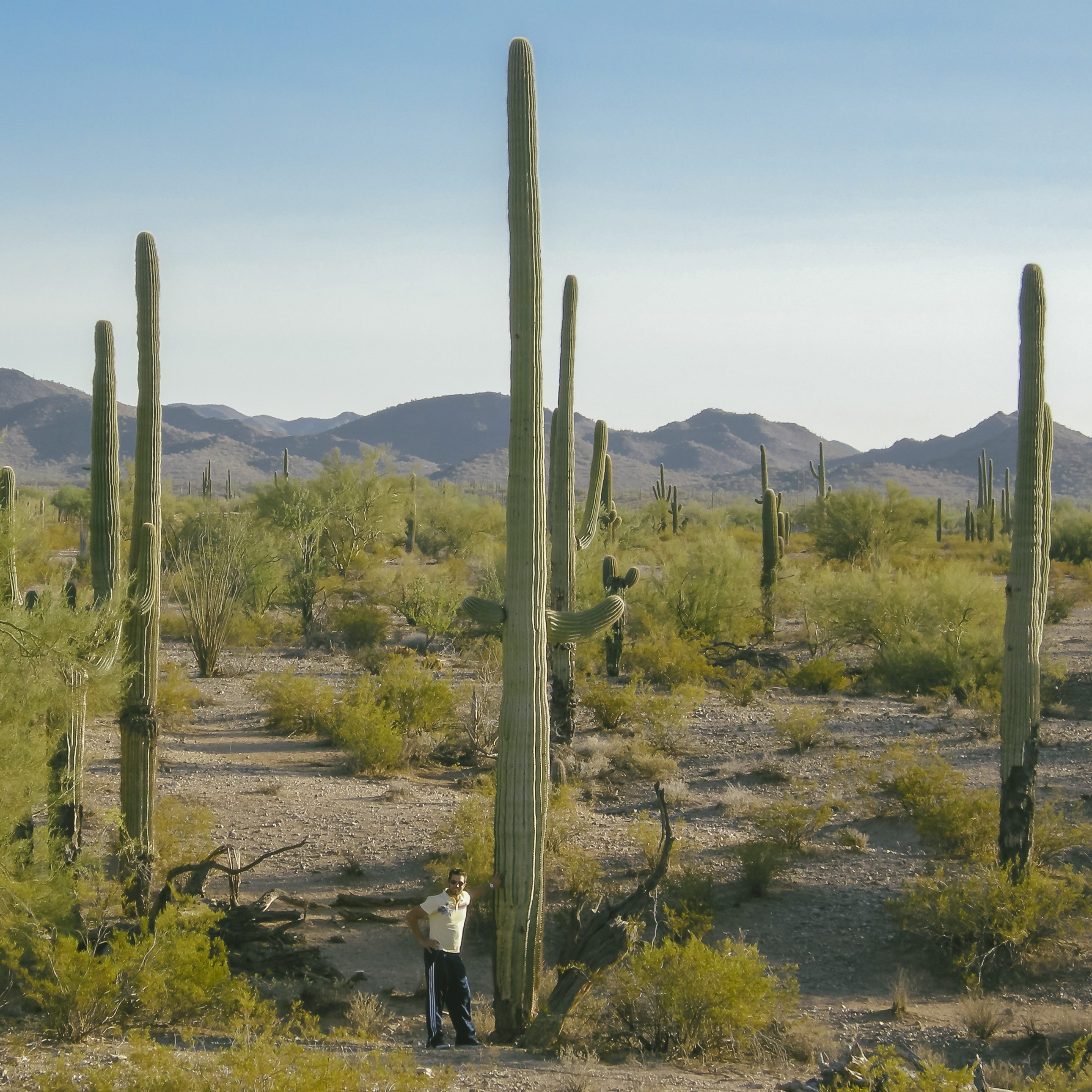
6-foot (1.8 m) man, Saguaro National Park

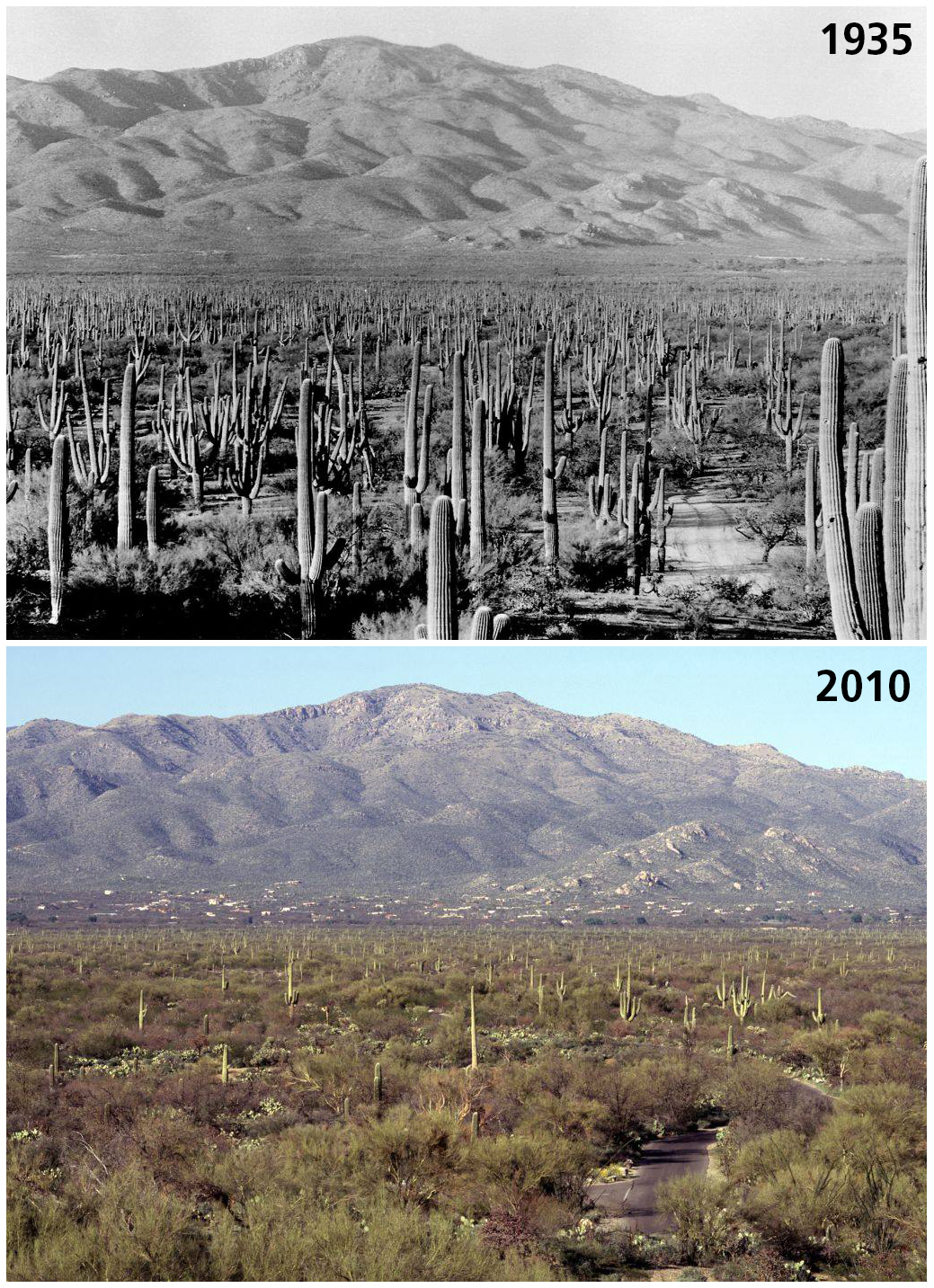
Saguaro cactus loss in Saguaro National Park between 1935 and 2010. Many of the mature saguaros in the 1935 photo are thought to have died during severe freeze events. With a warmer climate, these freeze events may become less common. However, saguaro seedlings are sensitive to drought, and recent prolonged drought and record heat has severely limited seedling establishment and survival. In addition, warmer temperatures also promote the spread of invasive buffelgrass, which fills in the spaces between saguaros and makes wildfire much easier to spread.

Harming or vandalizing a saguaro in any manner, such as shooting them (sometimes known as "cactus plugging") is illegal by state law in Arizona. When houses or highways are built, special permits must be obtained to move or destroy any saguaro affected. Exceptions to this general understanding exist; for example, a private landowner whose property is 10 acres (4 hectares) or less, where the initial construction has already occurred, may remove a saguaro from the property. This is common when the cactus falls over in a storm, its location interferes with a house addition, or it becomes a potential hazard to humans.

In 1982, a man was killed after damaging a saguaro. David Grundman was shooting and poking at a saguaro cactus in an effort to make it fall. An arm of the cactus, weighing 230 kg (500 lb), fell onto him, crushing him and his car. The trunk of the cactus then also fell on him. He was under the arm, and was shooting it with his friend. The Austin Lounge Lizards wrote the song "Saguaro" about this death.

Contrary to published statements, no law mandates prison sentences of 25 years for cutting a cactus down; however, it is considered a class-four felony with a possible 3-year, 9-month maximum sentence.

Invasive species, such as buffelgrass and Sahara mustard, pose significant threats to the Sonoran Desert ecosystem by increasing the rate of fires. Buffelgrass outcompetes saguaros for water, and grows densely. It is also extremely flammable, but survives fire easily due to deep root systems. Saguaros did not evolve in an environment with frequent fires, thus are not adapted to fire survival. Most Sonoran desert ecosystems have a fire return interval greater than 250 years; buffelgrass thrives at fire return intervals of two to three years. This has led to the reshaping of the Sonoran Desert ecosystem and threatens the survival of the saguaro.

Climate change may threaten saguaros and their ecosystems, as deserts are particularly susceptible to climate effects. Rising daytime and nighttime temperatures will reduce the water use efficiency of saguaros, forcing them to use more water and making them more likely to die during drought periods.

== Uses ==
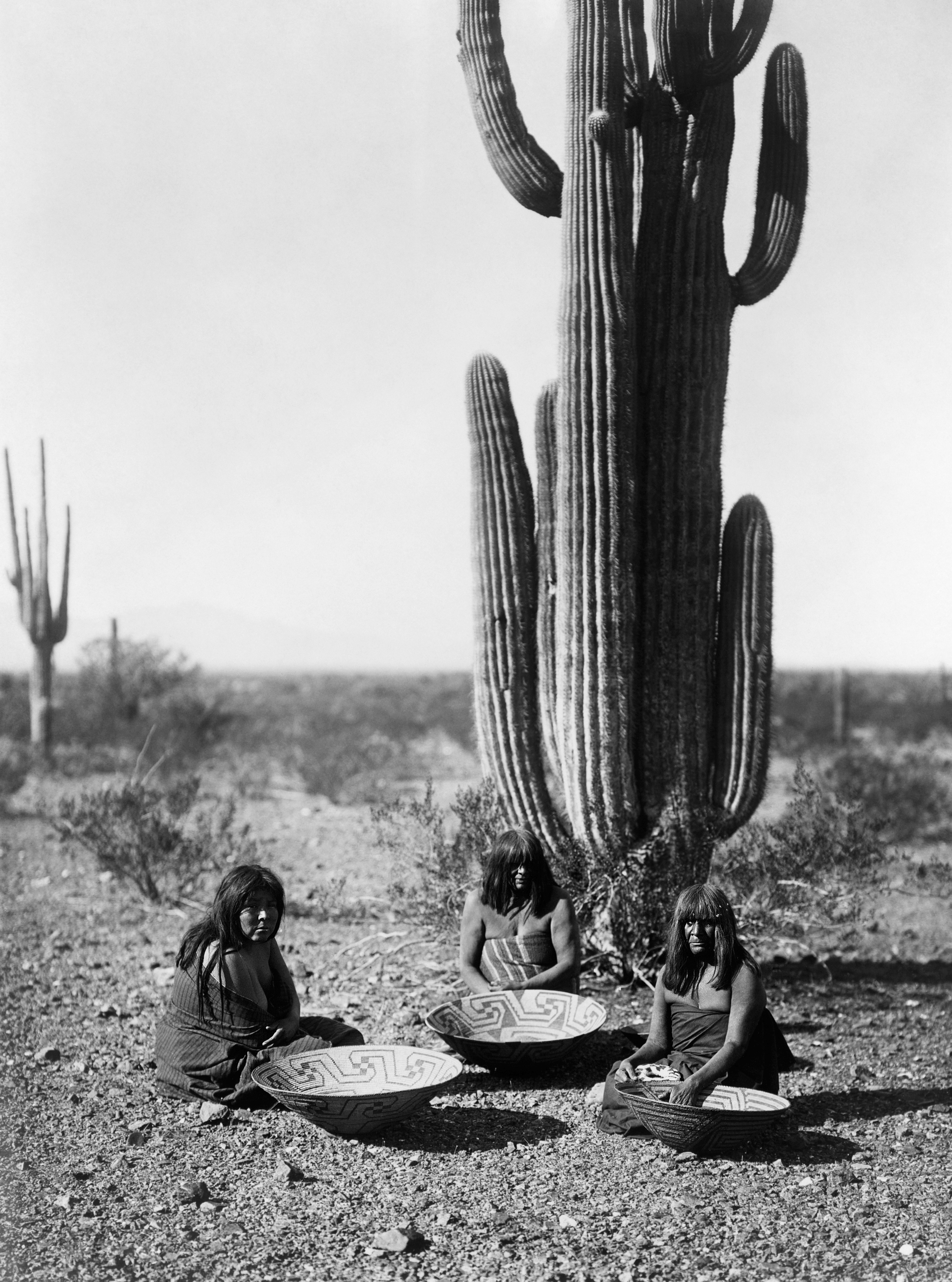
Maricopa women gathering saguaro fruits, photo by Edward S. Curtis, 1907

=== Ethnobotany ===
The utility of the saguaro is well known to Native Americans such as the Tohono O'odham, Pima, and Seri peoples, who still use nearly every part of the plant. The fruit and seeds are edible, being consumed fresh and dried, and made into preserves and drinks. The Tohono O'odham use long sticks to harvest the fruits, which are then made into a variety of products, including jams, syrups, and wine.

The Tohono O'odham begin their harvest in June. A pair of saguaro ribs, about 6 m (20 ft) long, are bundled together to make a harvesting tool called a kuibit. The Tohono O'odham traditionally reduce the freshly harvested fruit into a thick syrup through several hours of boiling, as the fresh fruit does not keep for long. Four kilograms (9 pounds) of fruit will yield about 1 liter (1/4 U.S. gallon) of syrup. Copious volumes of fruit are harvested; an example harvest in 1929 yielded 45,000 kg (99,000 lb) among 600 families. At the end of the harvest, each family would contribute a small amount of syrup to a communal stock that would be fermented by the medicine man. This was cause for rainmaking celebrations: Stories would be told, there was much dancing, and songs would be sung. Each man would drink some of the saguaro wine. The resulting intoxicated state was seen as holy, and any dreams it brought on were considered portentous.

- The seeds are ground into meal or eaten raw, but the raw seeds are mostly indigestible. They are also pressed for their oils. They also have minor use in the tanning of leather. In modern times, these uses have declined, and the seeds are now mainly used as chicken feed.
- The ribs of the dead saguaro were used for construction and other purposes by Native Americans. The Tohono O'odham use it for making fences and furniture. The ribs are also used as livestock fodder.
- A variety of alkaloids, including carnegine, gigantine, and salsolidine, make the stems quite bitter, and an unpalatable way to gain water.
- The old bird nests resist the elements and are gathered by Native Americans for use as storage vessels. Cactus boots, excavated by birds and taken from dead saguaros have been used by native peoples as water containers.

The saguaro features prominently in indigenous folklore and religions. Reports of saguaro use date back to the Coronado expeditions of 1540–1542, which noted its use in winemaking.

=== Commercial and institutional uses ===
Arizona made the saguaro blossom its territorial flower on March 13, 1901, and on March 16, 1931, it became the state flower.

The saguaro is often used as an emblem in commercials and logos that attempt to convey a sense of the Southwest. Notably, no naturally occurring saguaros are found within 400 kilometers (250 miles) of El Paso, Texas, but the silhouette is found on the label of Old El Paso brand products. Though the geographic anomaly has lessened in recent years, Western films once enthusiastically placed saguaros in the Monument Valley of Arizona (north of their native range), as well as New Mexico, Utah, and Texas.

America West Airlines, and later U.S. Airways after their merger in 2007, used the call sign "CACTUS" for radio communication on flights. America West was based in Phoenix, AZ, and "cactus" was chosen as a tribute to the saguaro cacti growing in the Phoenix area.

== Gallery ==
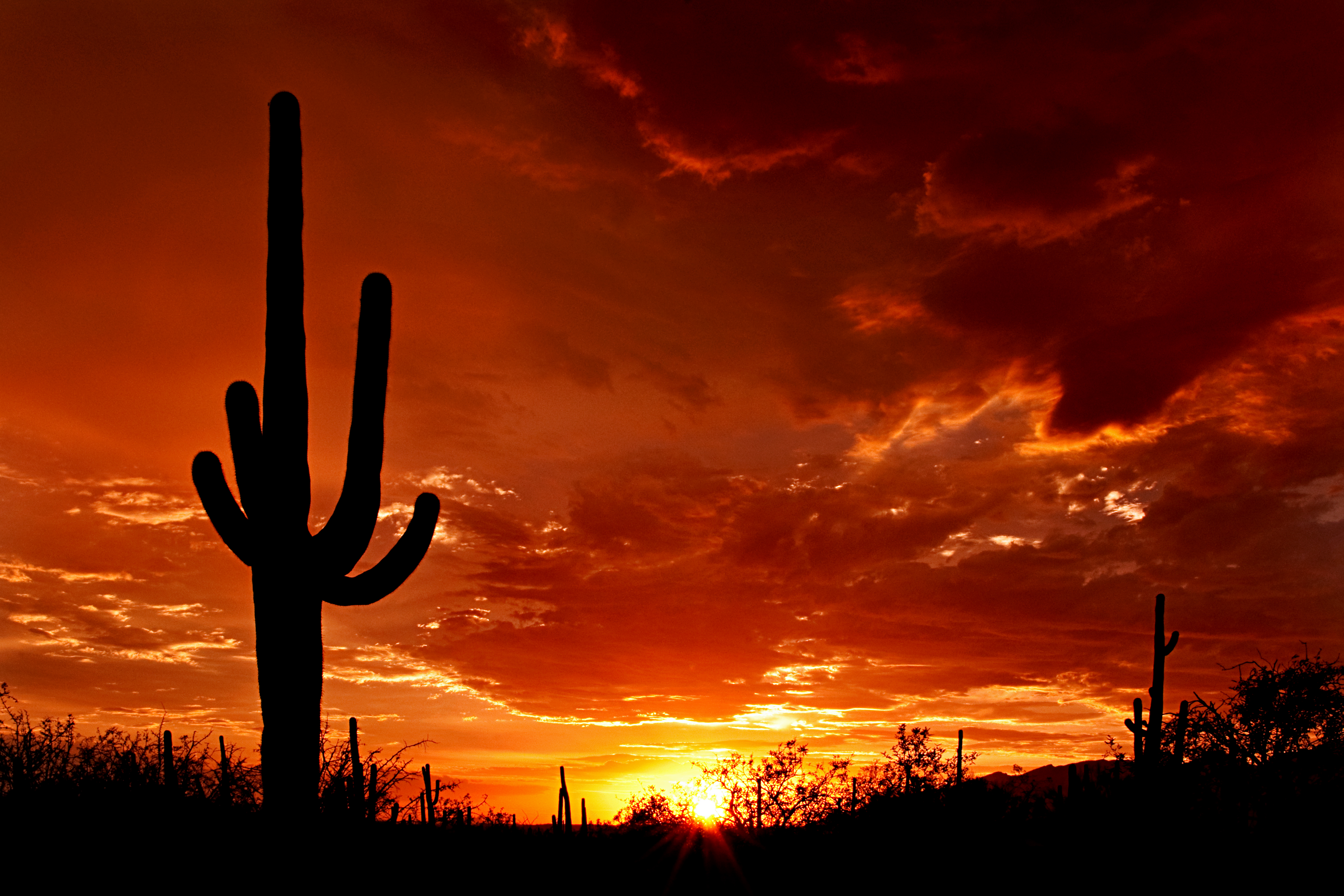
Silhouette at sunset

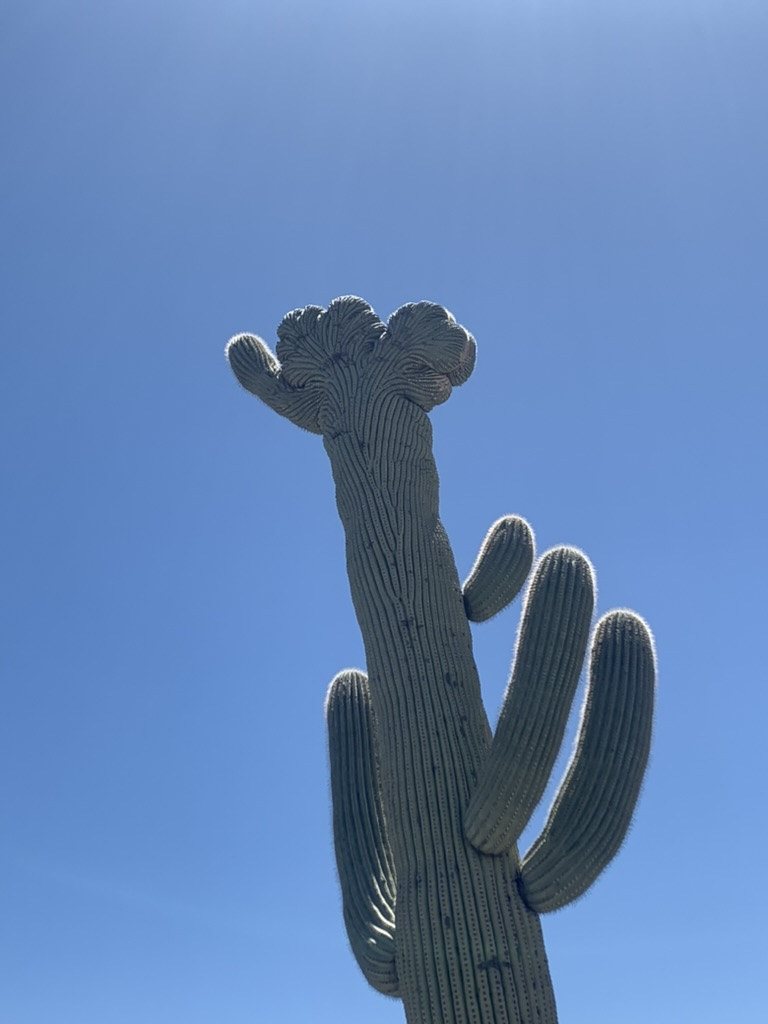
A crested saguaro

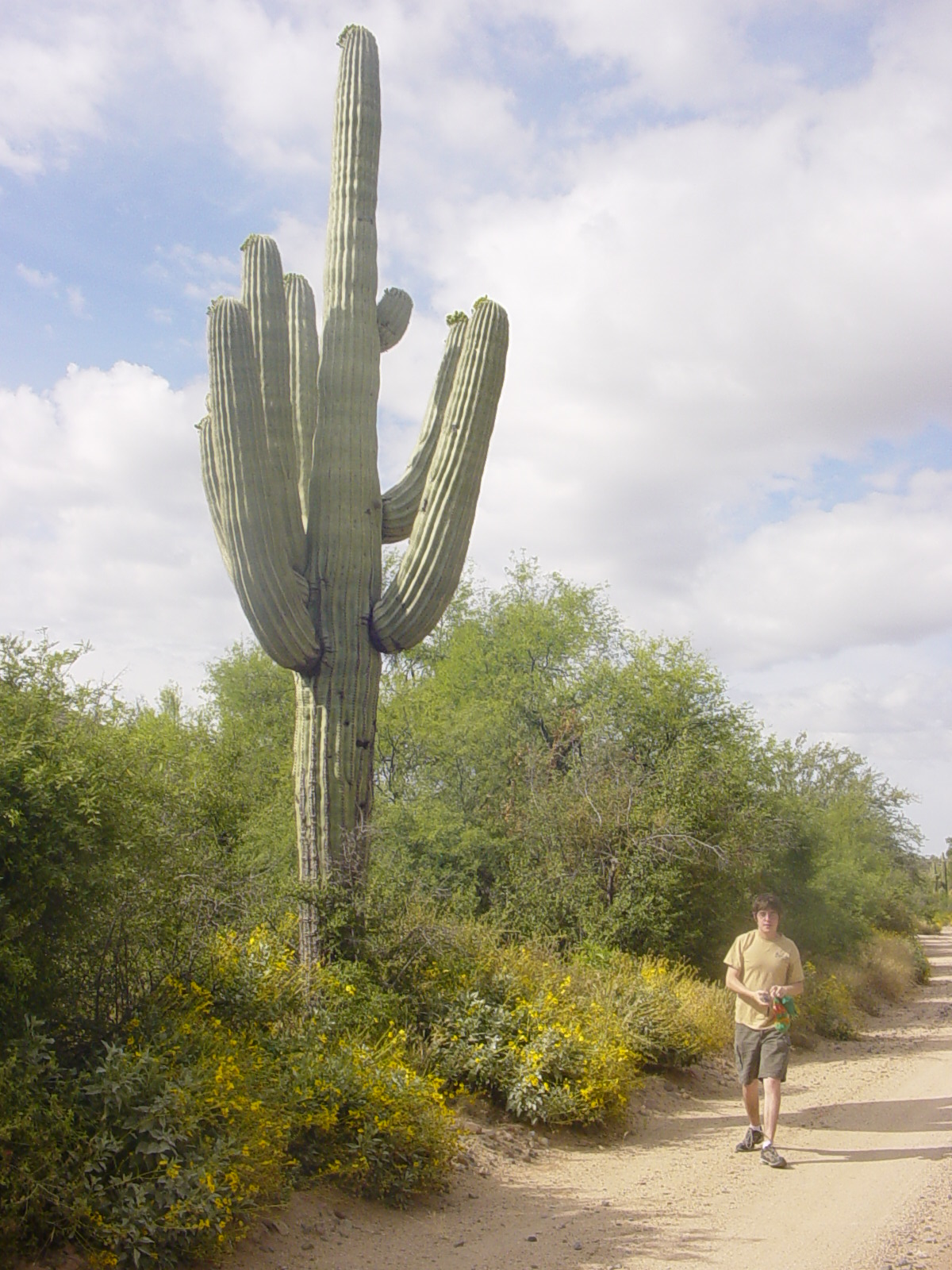
Saguaro towering over a 6 ft (1.8 m) man

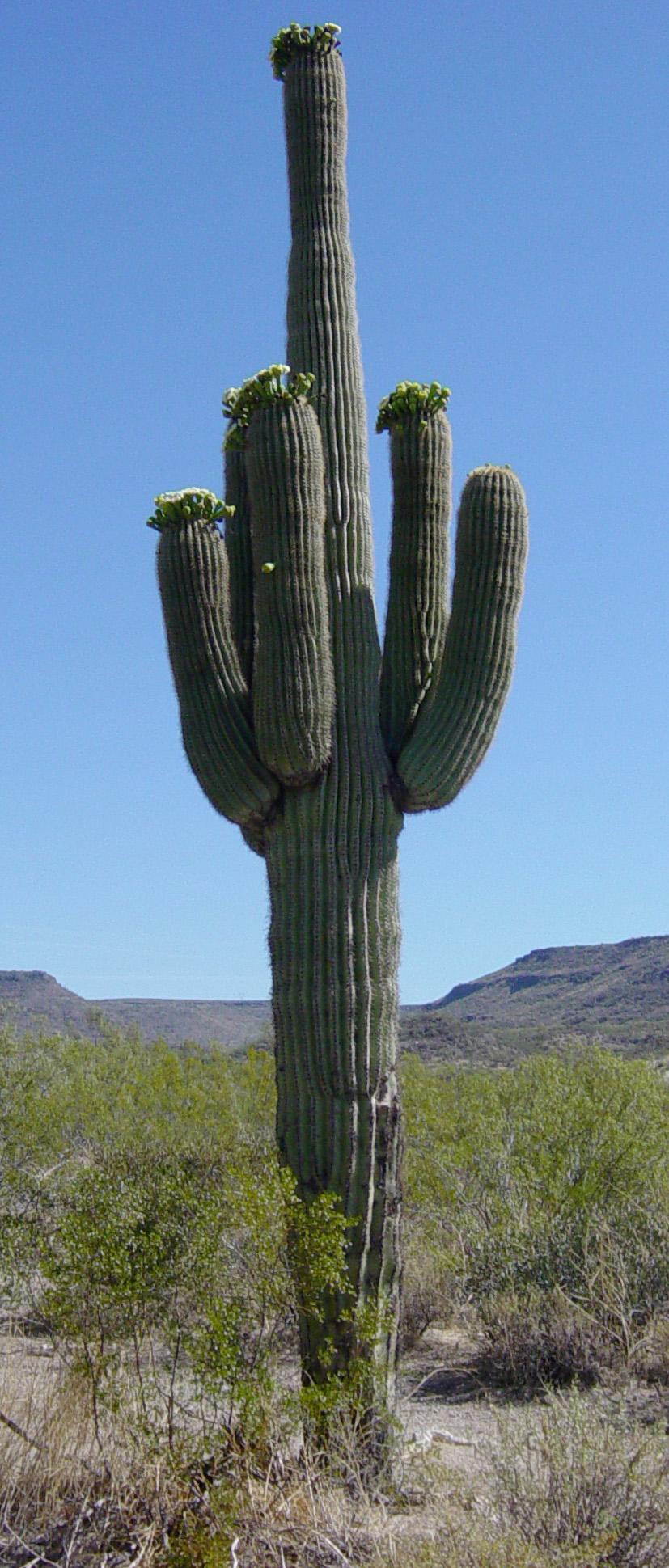
Mature five-armed in flower

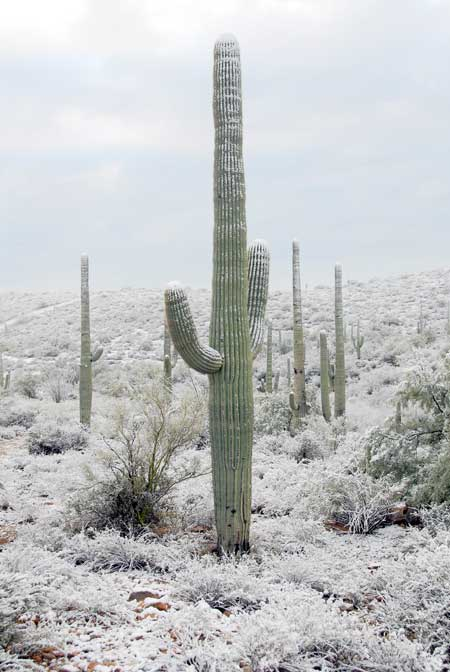
Snow-covered saguaro near Tucson

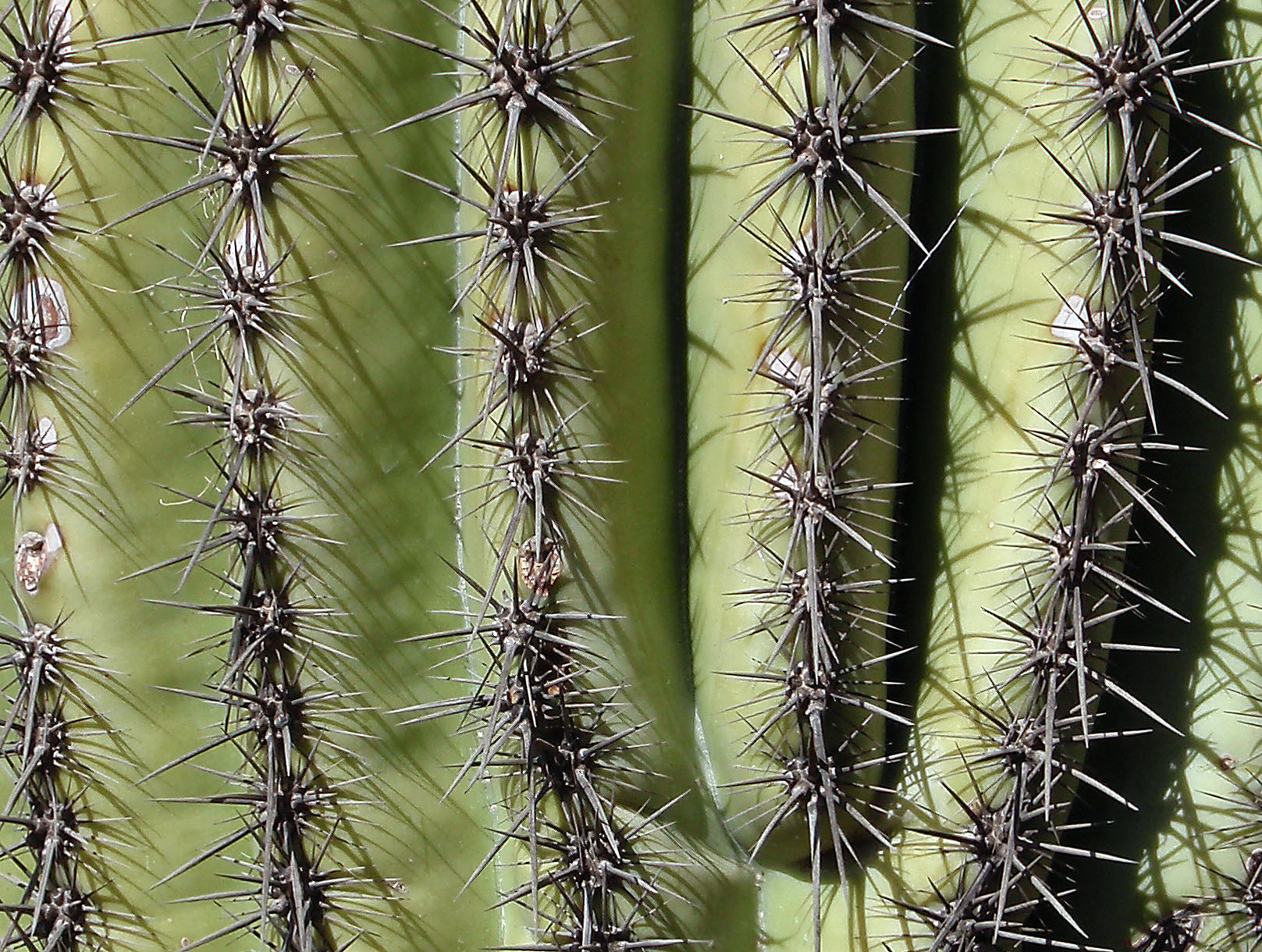
Needles, Paradise Valley, Arizona

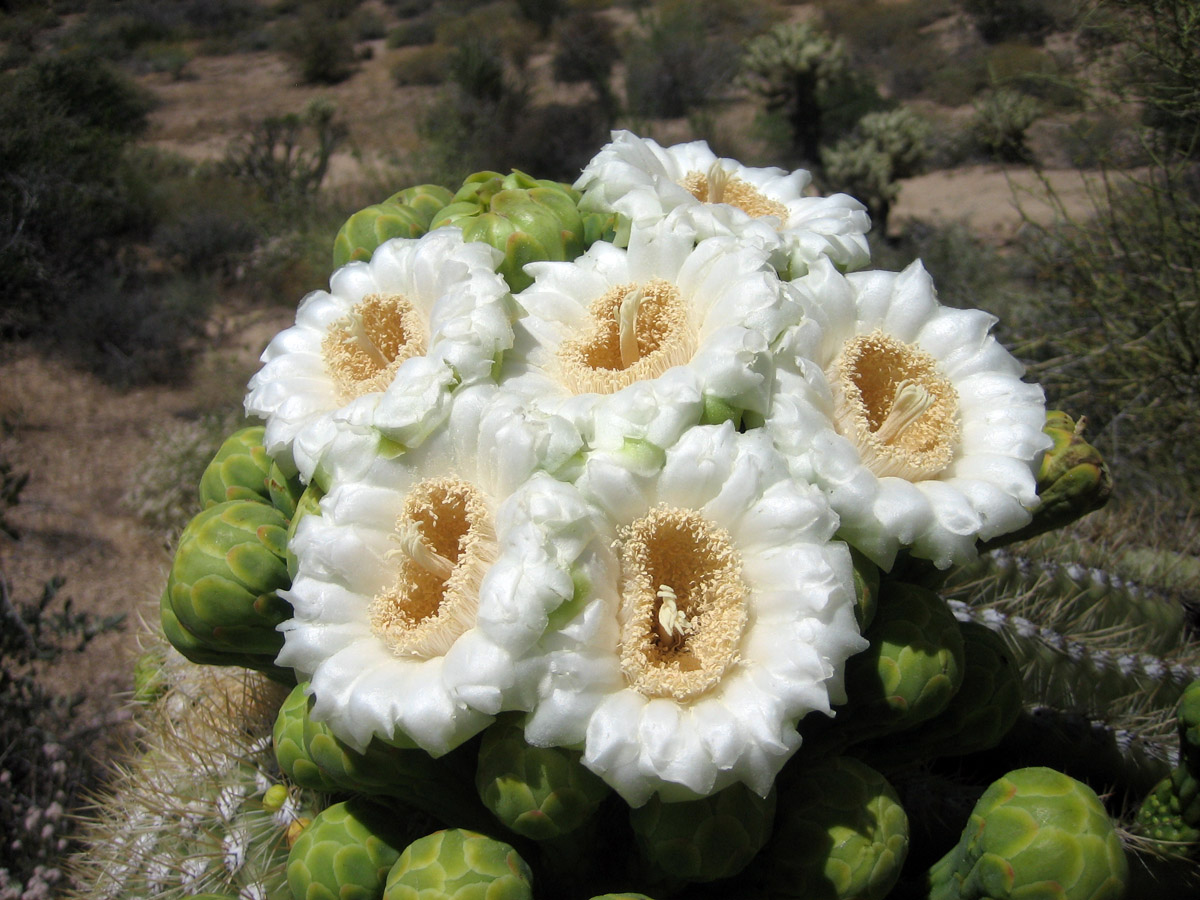
Flowers, Scottsdale, Arizona

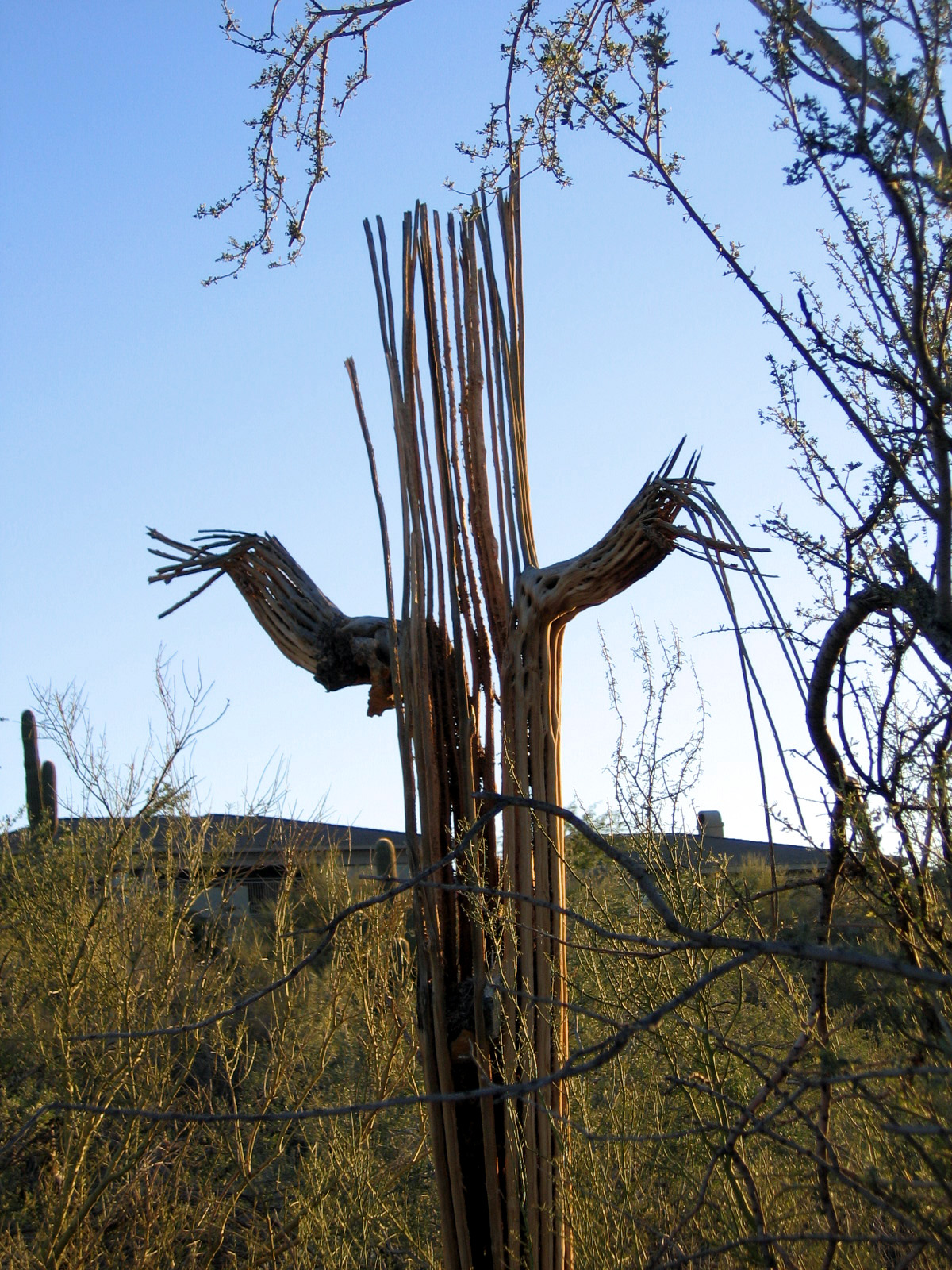
The bare wooden ribs of a dead saguaro

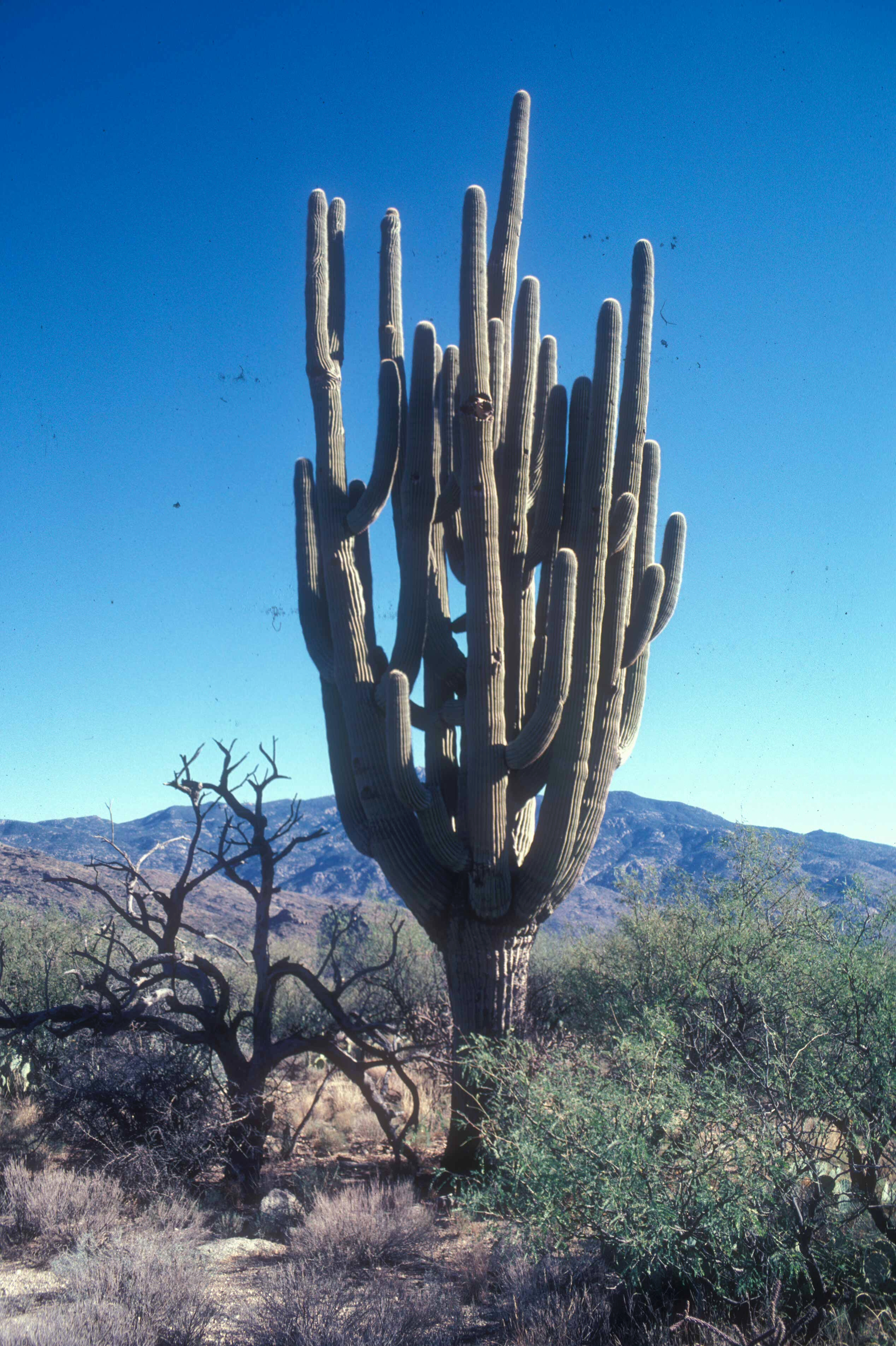
"Grand-daddy", the largest saguaro ever recorded, died in the early 1990s

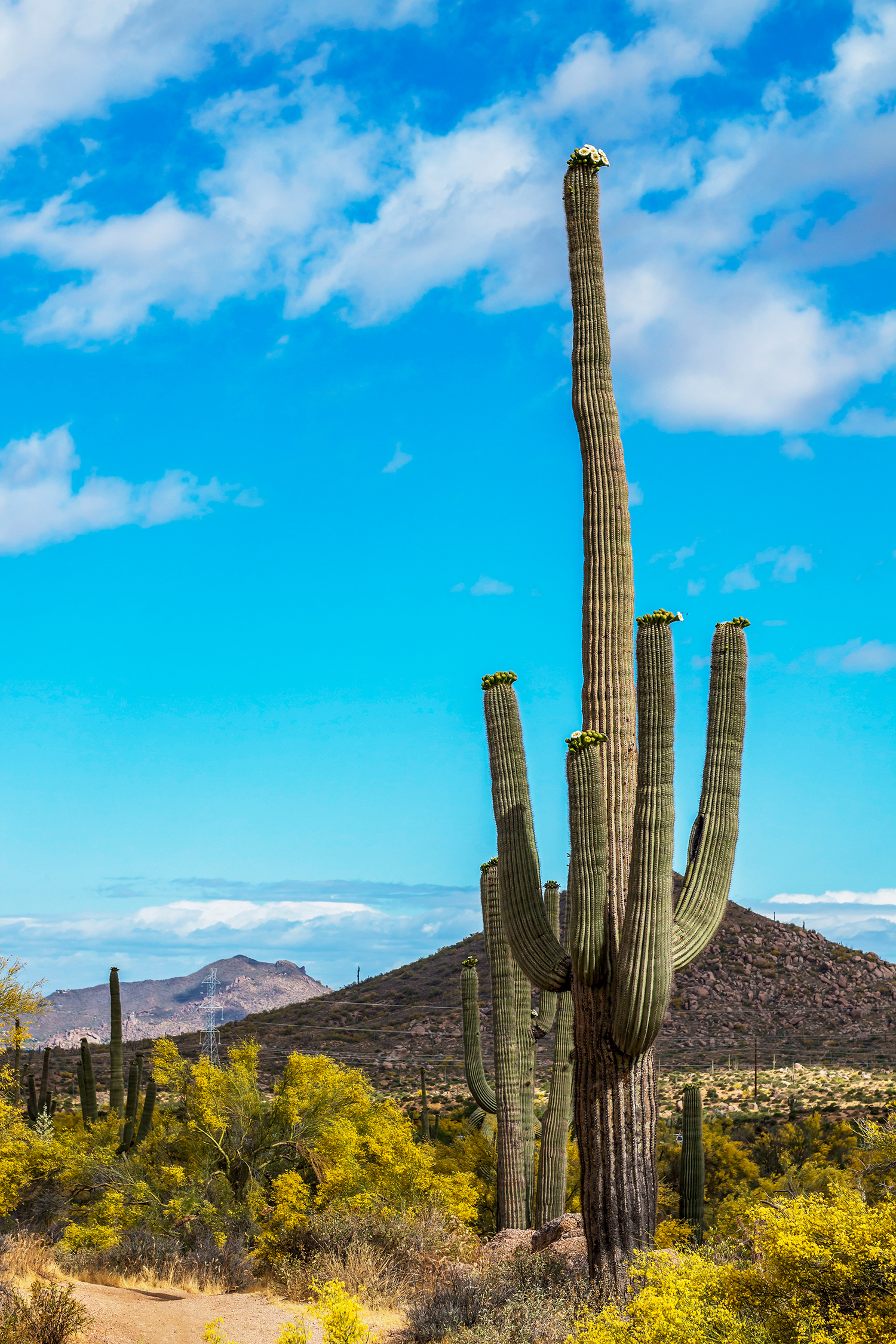
Saguaro in blossom in springtime
