= Cave Creek Complex Wildfire =

2005 wildfire in Arizona, USA

Coordinates: 33.978°N 111.785°W

The Cave Creek Complex Wildfire was the third largest forest fire in the state of Arizona to date, after the Rodeo–Chediski Fire and Wallow Fire.

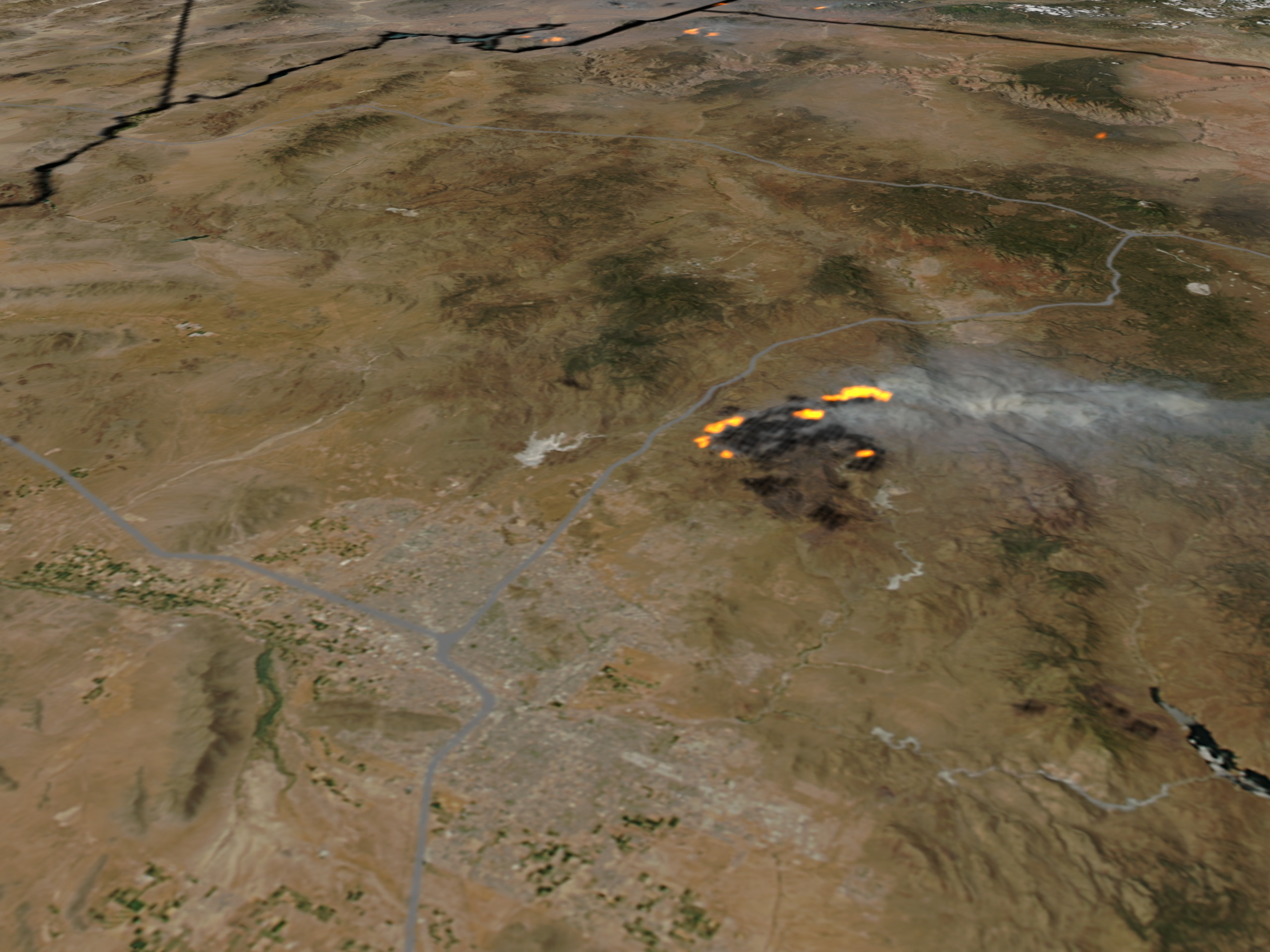
The Cave Creek Complex Fire seen from space on June 30

== History ==
The fire started on June 21, 2005, by a lightning strike and scorched 243,950 acres (987.2 km^{2}).

Within an hour, the fire had already burned from 2,000 to 10,000 acres (8.1 to 40.5 km^{2}).

When news agencies were covering the story, a FOX news affiliate captured video of the historic Cave Creek Mistress mine destroyed by the fire as soon as the fire touched it. The mine was a total loss.

The largest recorded saguaro cactus — standing at 46 feet tall and having a base circumference of 7 feet, 10 inches — was also injured in this fire, and later collapsed.

== Bibliography ==
- (2005). "FEMA Authorizes Funds To Help Arizona Fight Cave Creek Complex." FEMA.gov. Retrieved September 8.
- (2005). "Crews Work to Turn Arizona Wildfire Away From Homes." Los Angeles Times. June 24.
- (2005). "Western Flames." FOXNews. Retrieved September 8, 2007.
