= Gila woodpecker =

Conservation status
- Least Concern (IUCN 3.1)

Scientific classification
- Kingdom: Animalia
- Phylum: Chordata
- Class: Aves
- Order: Piciformes
- Family: Picidae
- Genus: Melanerpes
- Species: M. uropygialis

Binomial name
- Melanerpes uropygialis (Baird, 1854)
- Distribution (green)

Species of bird

The Gila woodpecker (Melanerpes uropygialis) is a medium-sized woodpecker of the desert regions of the southwestern United States and western Mexico. In the U.S., they range through southeastern California, southern Nevada, Arizona, and New Mexico.

== Description ==
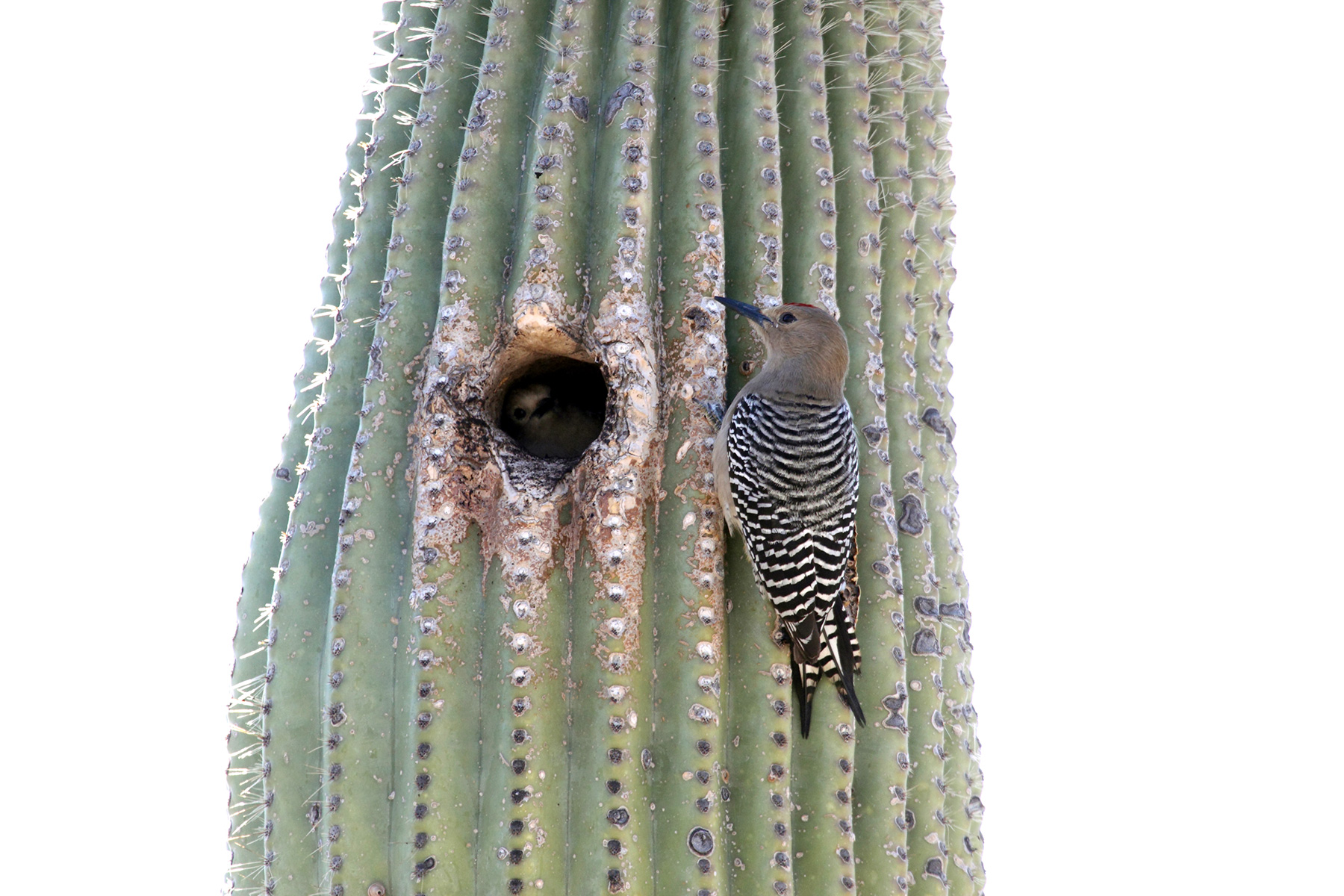
On saguaro cactus next to nesting hole

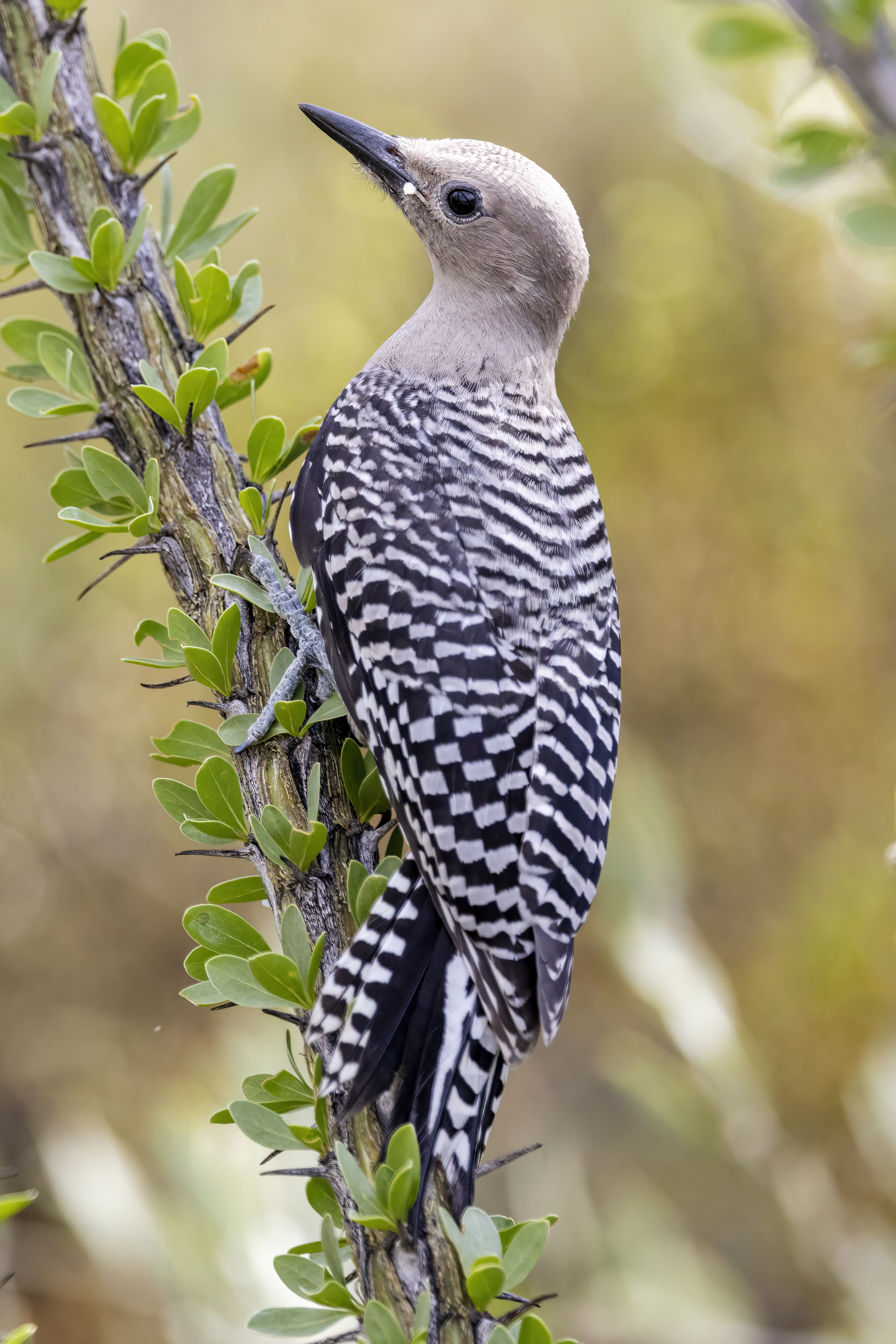
female bird

The back and wings of this bird are spotted and barred with a black and white zebra-like pattern. The neck, throat, belly and head are greyish-tan in color. The male has a small red cap on the top of the head. Females and juveniles birds are similar, but both lack the red cap of the adult male. White wing patches are prominent in flight. The dark tail has white bars on the central tail feathers. The birds range from 8–10 in (20–25 cm) in length.

This woodpecker's voice is a rolling churr sound. It also makes a yip yip yip sound and a kee-u, kee-u, kee-u sound. Its drum is long and steady.

== Distribution & habitat ==
This woodpecker's habitat consists of low desert scrub typical of the Sonoran Desert, as well as arroyos (washes) and small towns.

== Behavior and ecology ==
=== Breeding ===
They build nests in holes made in saguaro cacti or mesquite trees. Cavities excavated by these woodpeckers in saguaro cacti (known as a "boot") are later used by a variety of other species, including the elf owl. There, they typically lay 3–4 white eggs, although as many as 6 or 7 have been noted. 2–3 broods are laid a year. Both sexes incubate and feed offspring.

=== Feeding ===
As a woodpecker, its diet is composed greatly of insects, which it gains from drilling into bark. Gila woodpeckers are omnivorous, and do take fruits, nectar, seeds, as well as lizards, eggs, worms, and even young chicks of small birds. They are even known to hang on human placed hummingbird feeders and sip up the nectar.

== Status ==
The IUCN rates the species as least concern. It is an endangered species in California, where populations have suffered notably. Arizona populations remain strong. The effects of climate change could severely reduce available habitat.

== Gallery ==
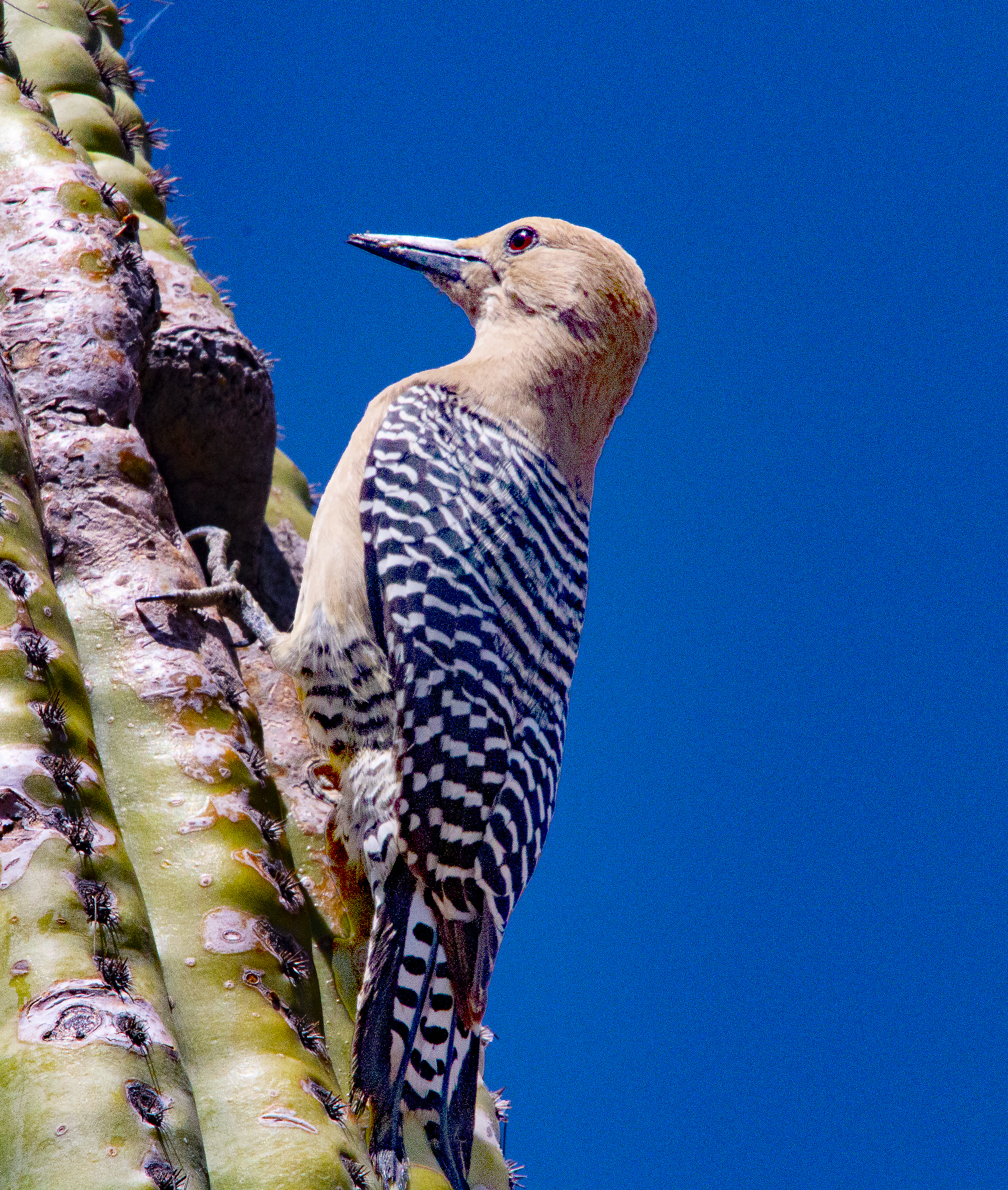
Female Gila Woodpecker, Paradise Valley, AZ

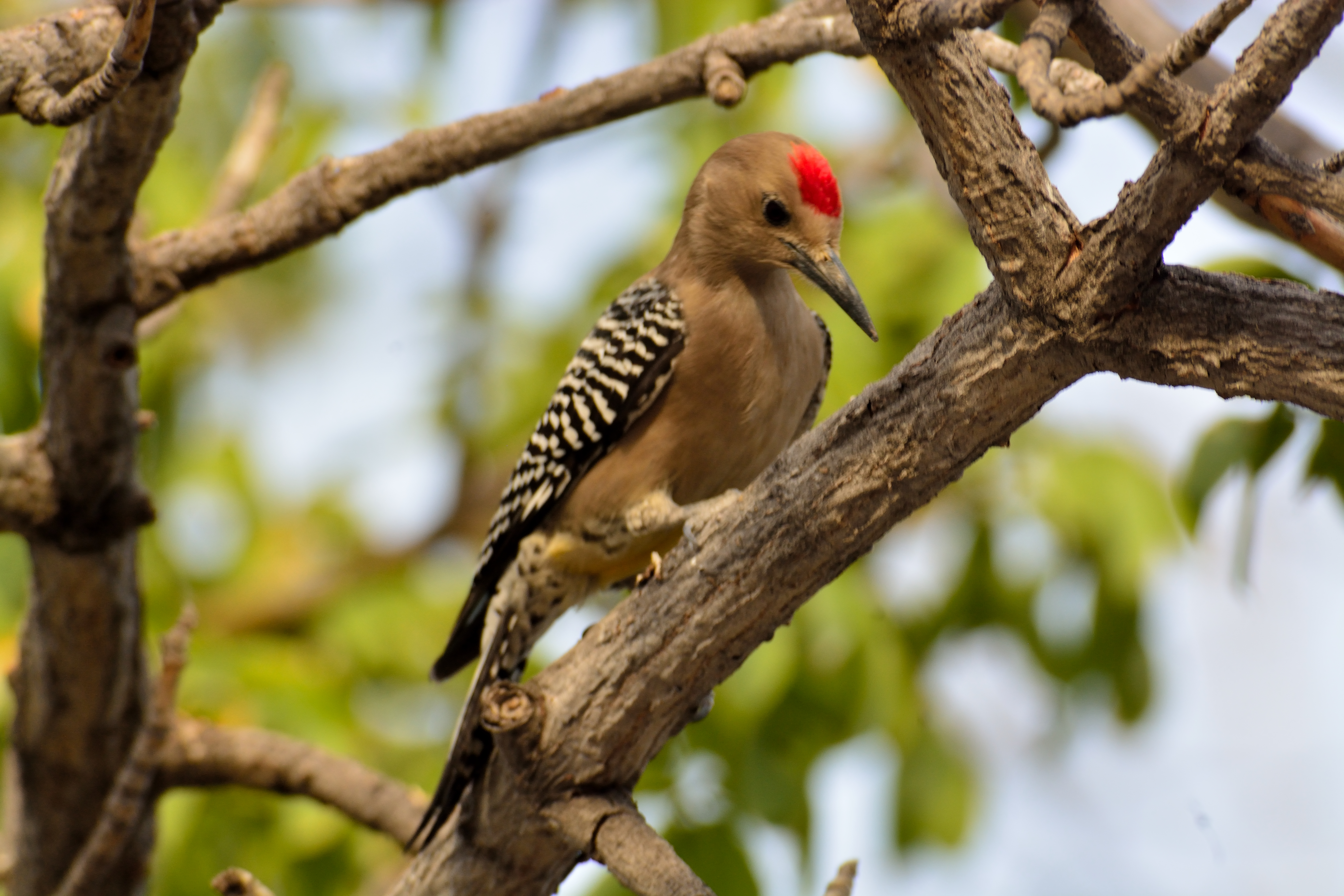
In Hermosillo, Sonora, Mexico

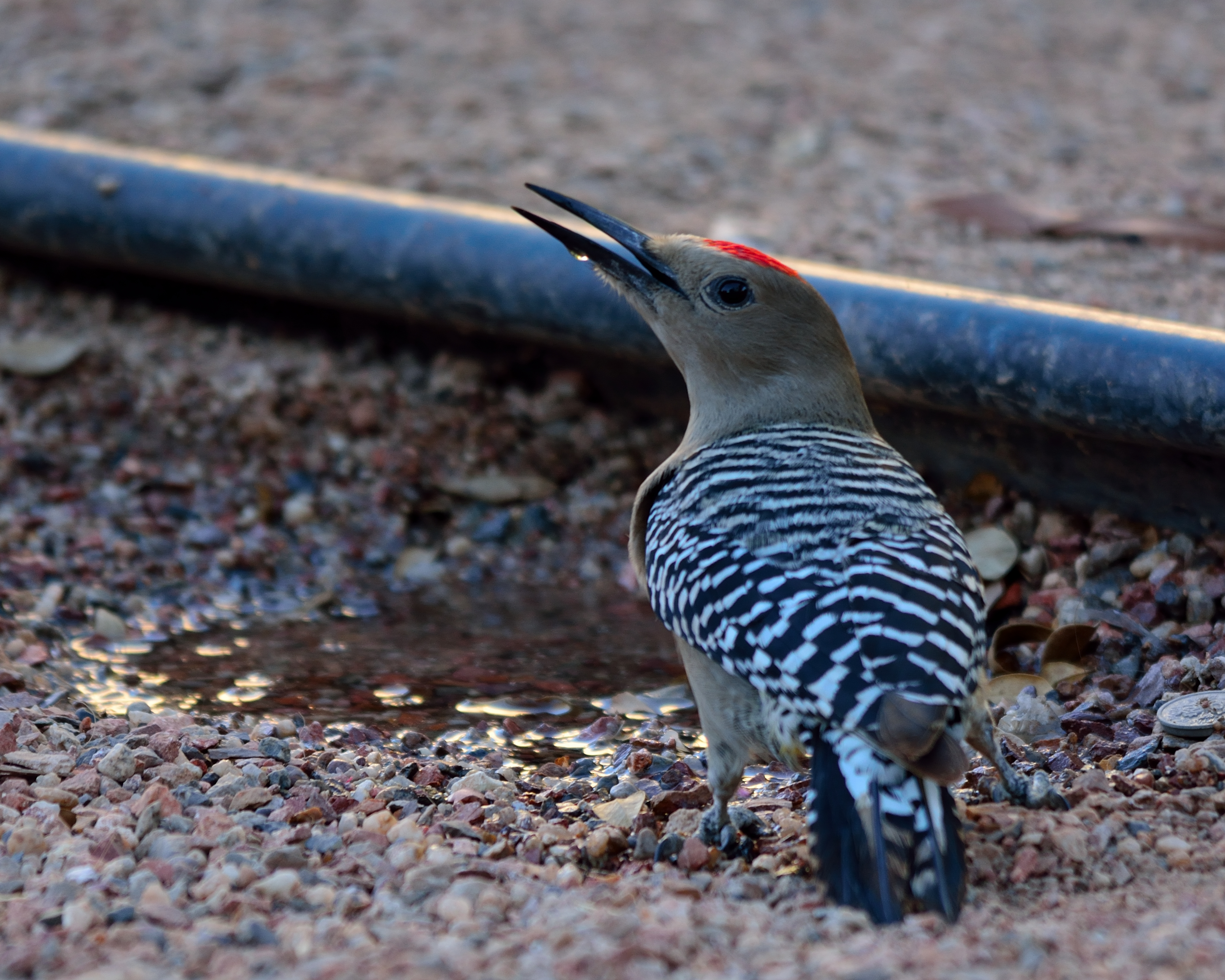
A Gila woodpecker drinking water

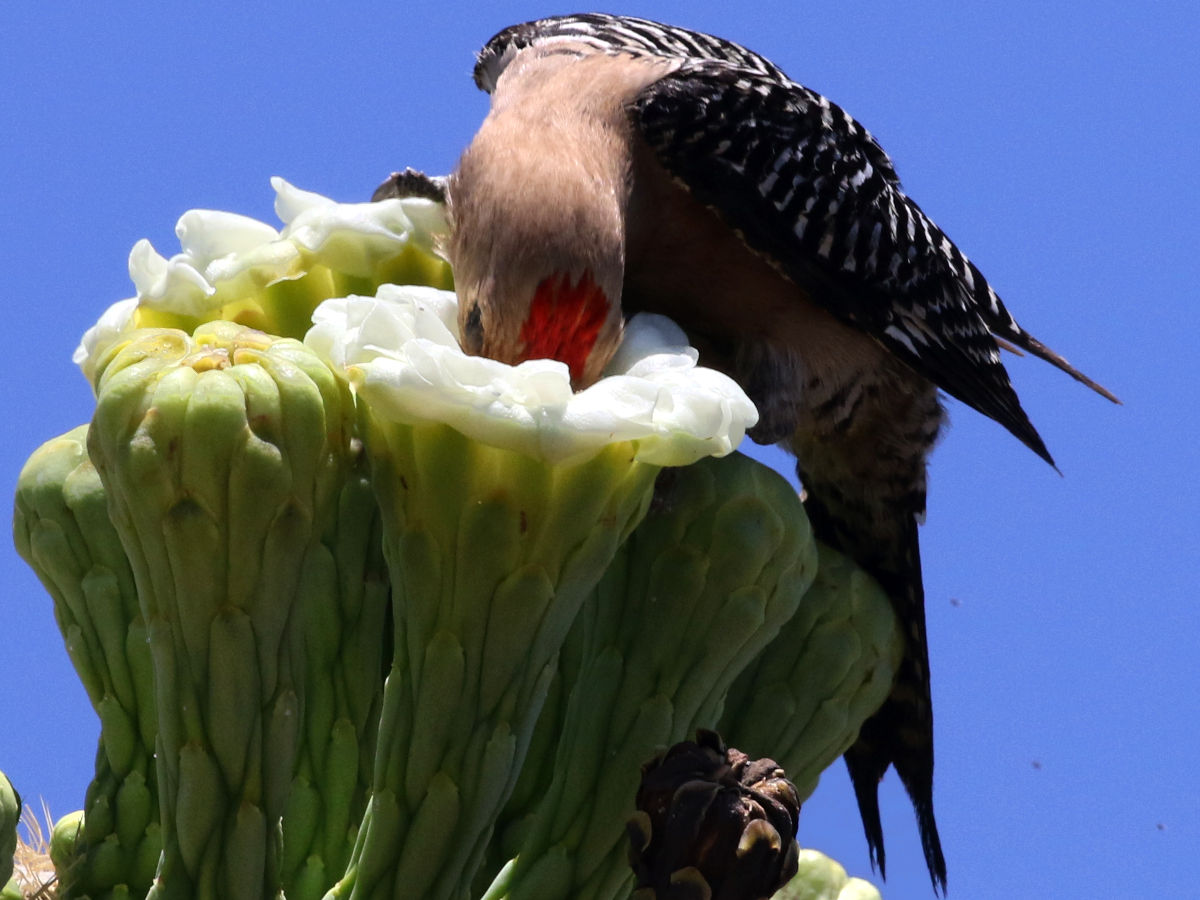
Male seeks nectar from a Saguaro flower

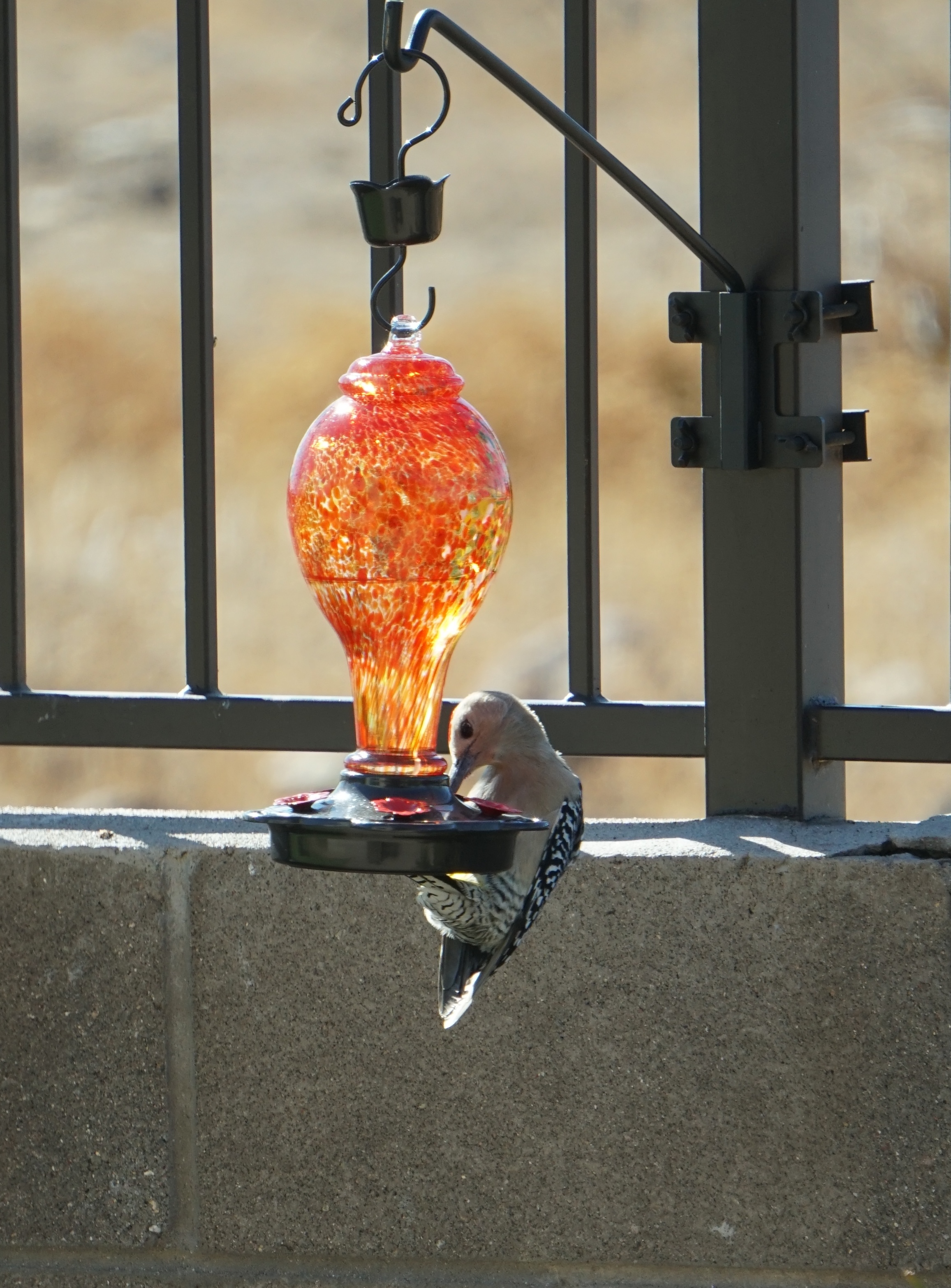
Male on hummingbird feeder, North Phoenix, AZ
