= Flora of the Sonoran Desert =

Plant species of the Sonoran desert

Flora of the Sonoran Desert includes six subdivisions based on vegetation types. Two are north of the boundary between the United States and Mexico, and four are south of the boundary. The flora of the Colorado Desert are influenced by the environment of the very dry and hot lower areas of the Colorado River valley, which may be barren, treeless, and generally have no large cacti. Flora of the Arizona Upland are comparatively lush, with trees and large columnar cacti that can withstand winter frosts. Those subdivisions of the Sonoran Desert which lie south of the international border are characterized by plants that cannot withstand frost.

== Plants ==
=== Annuals ===
There are two seasons with significant precipitation, in the winter-spring months, and in the summer monsoon months. Annual plants mostly germinating during winter-spring precipitation tend to have closer affinities to flora of the Mojave Desert.

=== Cacti ===
All of the following cacti live in the Sonoran Desert:

- Barrel cactus, Echinocactus and Ferocactus
- Buckhorn cholla cactus, Cylindropuntia acanthocarpa
- Cardon cactus, Pachycereus pringlei
- Englemann prickly-pear cactus, Opuntia engelmannii
- Fishhook barrel cactus, Ferocactus wislizeni
- Ocotillo cactus, Fouquieria splendens
- Organpipe cactus, Stenocereus thurberi
- Saguaro, Carnegiea gigantea
- Senita cactus, Lophocereus schottii

=== Colorado Desert flora ===
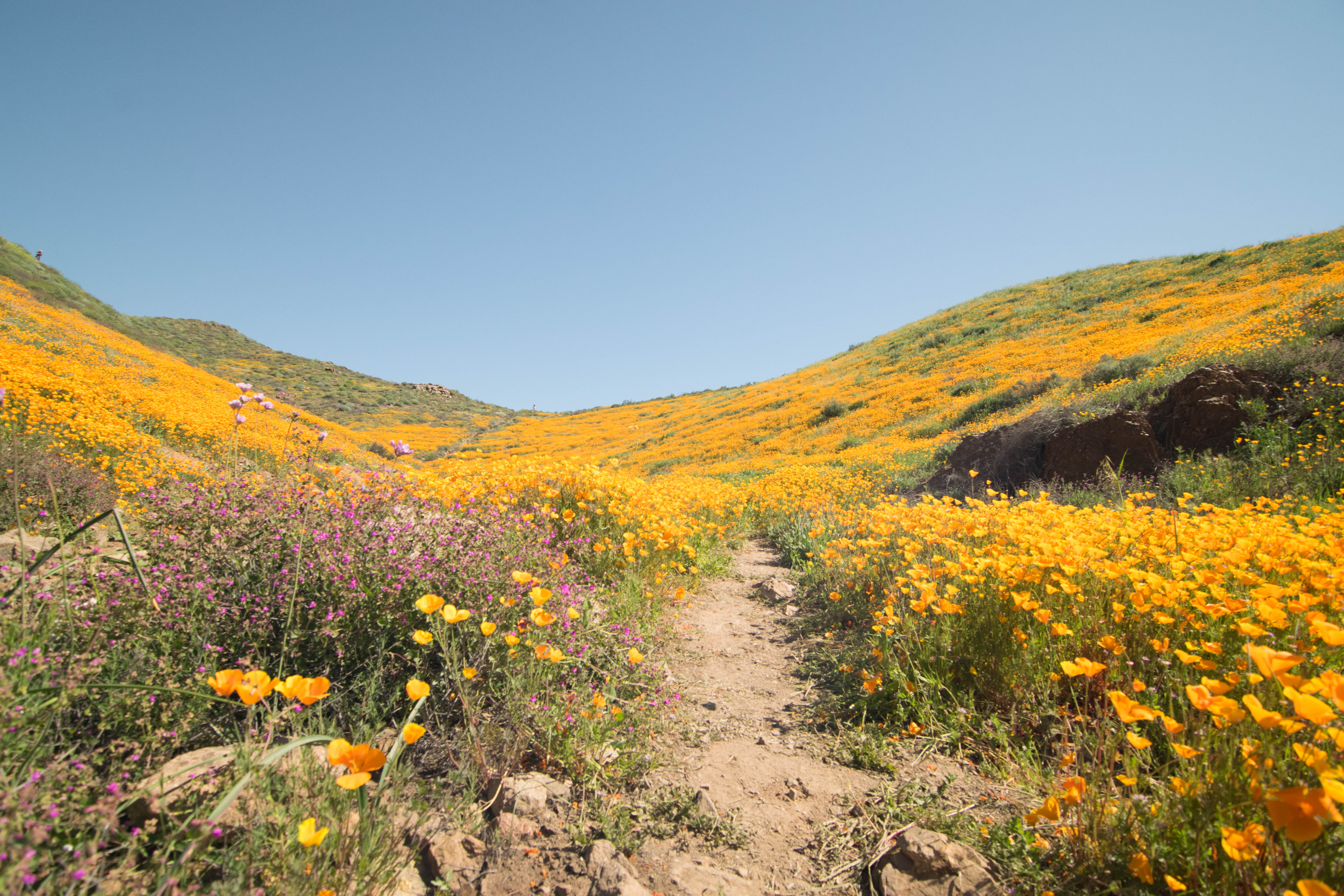
Unique weather conditions lead to a "super bloom" in March 2017.

The Colorado Desert is the low area of the Colorado River Valley and surrounding hills and mountains. Plants must survive its hot and dry conditions. Temperatures can be greater than 120 °F (49 °C). Annual precipitation is sometimes less than 3 inches (7.6 cm). Density of vegetation gradually diminishes moving from the Arizona Upland into the Colorado Desert proper.

It is common to find areas where a layer of pebbles is left after wind and water removes the lighter gravels and sand, and the pebbles are cemented together with desert varnish, causing landforms called desert pavement that are impenetrable to many species. Unlike in the Arizona Upland where trees are common, they are mostly absent, except along watercourses and areas where water collects after rain.

Common plants are the burrobush shrub (Ambrosia dumosa), giving a grayish cast to the viewscape, and creosotebush (Larrea tridentata). Also common, but more widely spaced, is ocotillo (Fouquieria splendens). In areas of intermittent water steams (desert dry wash), ironwood (Olneya tesota), yellow paloverde (Parkinsonia microphylla), and Smoketree (Psorothamnus spinosus) can be found.

The Saguaro cactus is still present, but less frequently than in the Arizona uplands, and is smaller in this ecotone. It is almost entirely absent on the California side of the Colorado River.

Desert Holly (Atriplex hymenelytra) can tolerate even the hottest and driest sites.

=== Ecotone of Colorado Desert and Arizona Upland ===
The area where two vegetation types border, overlap, and transition is called an ecotone. The ecotone between the hotter, drier Colorado Desert and that of the relatively cooler and wetter Arizona Upland occurs from Parker, Arizona southeast to near Phoenix, then south to Organ Pipe Cactus National Monument. Density of vegetation gradually diminishes moving from the Arizona Upland into the Colorado Desert proper. can be found with stems climbing through shrubs and other vegetation, producing "spectacular" floral displays on supporting vegetation.

=== Lichens ===
Dimelaena thysanota is a crustose lichen found on rock faces.

=== Trees ===
Blue paloverde trees (Parkinsonia florida), with smooth blue-green photosynthetic bark, and yellow paloverde (Parkinsonia microphylla) are in the a legume family (Fabaceae). There are extensive stands of velvet mesquite (Prosopis velutina) in the valleys of the Arizona Upland, where colder air collects.
