= Flora of the Colorado Desert =

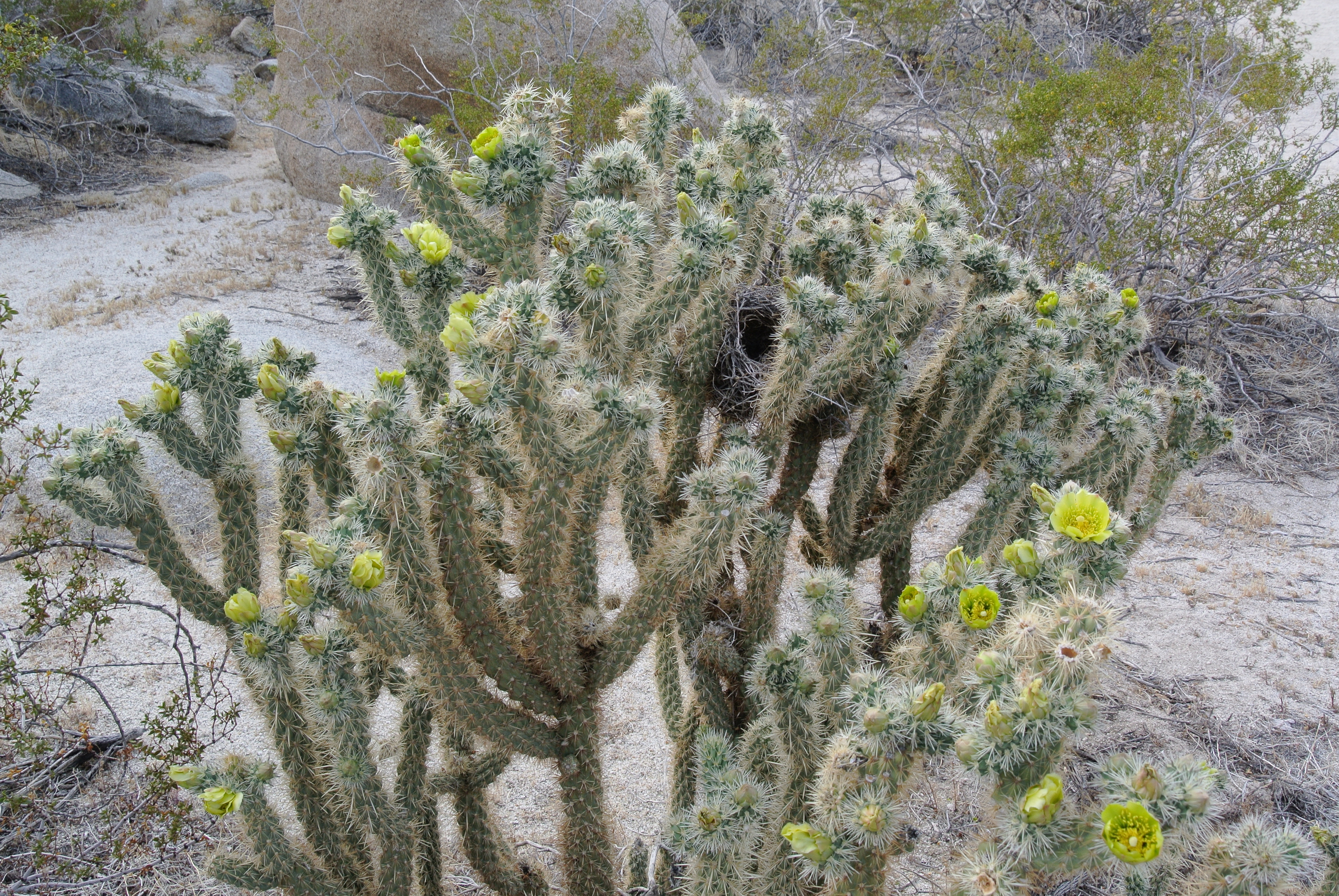
Blooming cholla cactus with bird's nest in Anza Borrego Desert State Park

Flora of the Colorado Desert, located in Southern California. The Colorado Desert is a sub-region in the Sonoran Desert ecoregion of southwestern North America. It is also known as the Low Desert, in contrast to the higher elevation Mojave Desert or High Desert, to its north.

== Plant communities ==
The desert flora comprises terrestrial plant communities including: creosote bush scrub; alkali sink, desert dry wash, mixed scrub; desert saltbush; sandy soil grasslands; desert dunes. The higher elevation Madrean Sky Islands are dominated by pinyon pine and California juniper (Juniperus californica), with areas of Manzanita and Coulter pine (Pinus coulteri).

More than half of the Colorado Desert's plant species are herbaceous annuals, and appropriately timed winter rains produce abundant early spring wildflowers. In the southern portion of the region, the additional moisture supplied by summer rainfall fosters the germination of summer annual plants. The summer monsoons also support smoketree, Desert Ironwood, and palo verde trees in desert washes. Hardy perennials and the

=== Wetland biota ===
In the Colorado Desert's arid environment, aquatic and wetland habitats are limited in extent but are critically important to wildlife. Runoff from seasonal rains and groundwater emergence flow seasonally in desert bajadas and washes, arroyos, and ephemeral streams, and brine lakes.

Springs and seeps feed oases, freshwater marshes, and a few foothill perennial streams year round. desert riparian vegetation communities dominated by cottonwood, willow, and non-native tamarisk. Two of the region's most significant aquatic systems are the Salton Sea and the Colorado River.

While most desert wildlife depend on aquatic habitats as water sources, a number of species, such as the arroyo toad, desert pupfish, Yuma rail, and southwestern willow flycatcher, are restricted to these habitats. In some places, summer rains produce short-lived seasonal pools that host uncommon species like Couch's spadefoot toad.

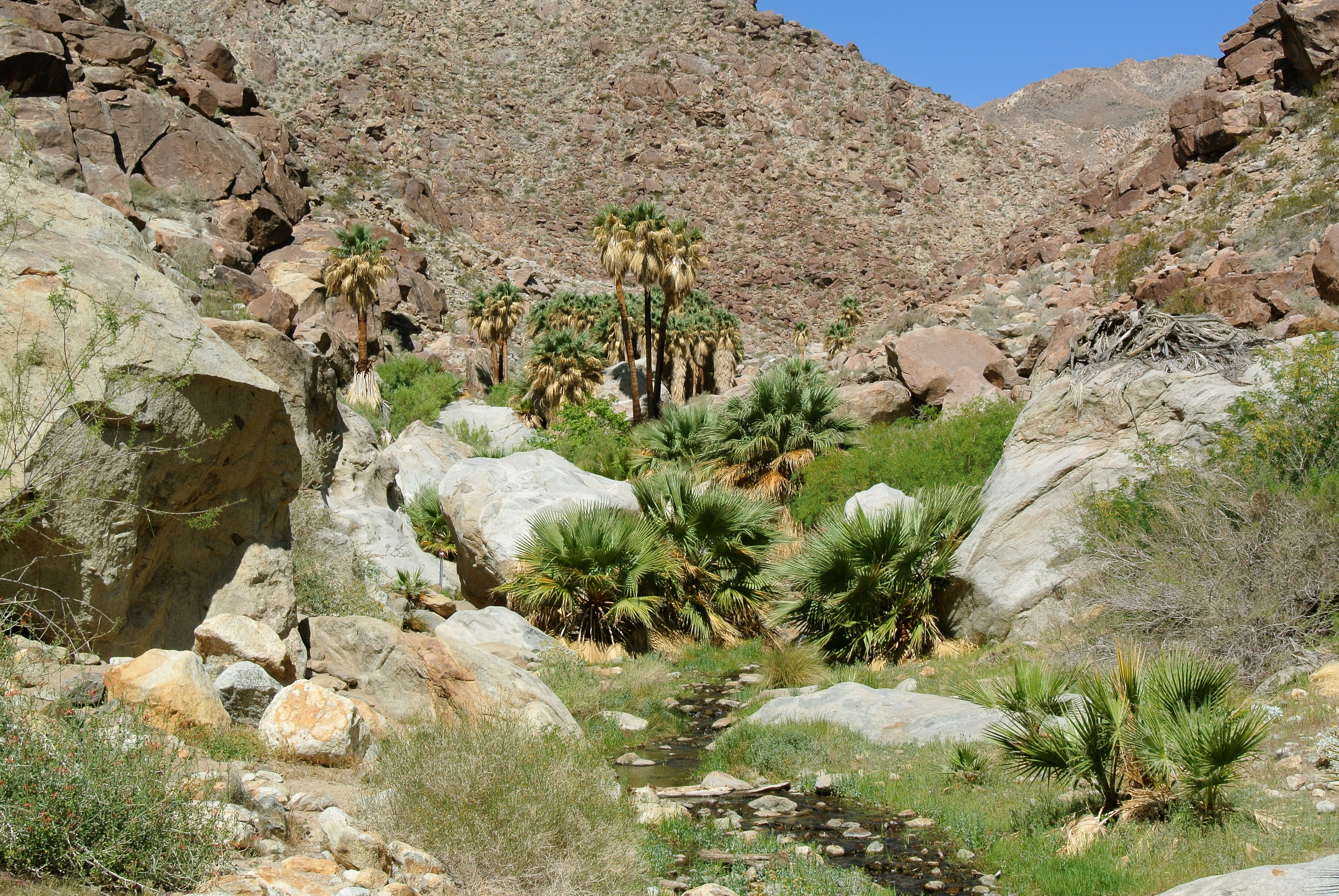
Washingtonia filifera in Anza Borrego Desert State Park

Desert California fan palm oases are rare ecological communities found only in the Colorado Desert. They occur only where permanent water sources are available, such as at springs or along fault lines, where groundwater is forced to the surface by the movement of hard impermeable rock, and can be found in: the canyons of the San Jacinto Mountains, Santa Rosa Mountains, and Little San Bernardino Mountains, and Anza-Borrego Desert State Park; and along the San Andreas Fault in the Coachella Valley. The only palm native to California, Washingtonia filifera (California fan palm), grows in natural groves at the oases.

== Evolutionary history ==
- Salton Sink

== Environmental factors ==
- Ecotones
- Microclimates
- North American Monsoons — aka: Mexican monsoons, Southwestern U.S. monsoons, Arizona monsoons.

== Vegetation types ==
Vegetation types and habitats are differentiated by elevation The higher elevation Madrean Sky Islands support Single-leaf Pinyon pine (Pinus monophylla) and California juniper (Juniperus californica), with areas of Manzanita and Coulter pine (Pinus coulteri).

Desert riparian habitats support Fremont cottonwood (Populus fremontii), willows (Salix species). Introduced Tamarisk trees are an invasive species in these areas.

== Flora ==
=== Endemic species ===
Endemic flora species of the Colorado Desert include:

- Salvia greatae — Orocopia sage
- Astragalus lentiginosus var. coachellae — Coachella Valley Milkvetch

Species endemic to California habitats, found in the Colorado Desert include:

- Hesperocallis undulata — Desert lily
- Nolina bigelovii — Bigelow's nolina
- Peucephyllum schottii — Desert fir
- Astragalus tricarinatus — Triplerib milkvetch
- Chorizanthe parryi — Parry's spineflower
- Ericameria pinifolia — Pinebush
- Leptosyne bigelovii — Bigelow coreopsis
- Pholisma sonorae — Sandfood

== See also ==
- Natural history of the Colorado Desert
- List of flora of the Sonoran Desert Region by common name
- Flora of the California desert regions
- Flora of the Sonoran Deserts
- Fauna of the Colorado Desert
