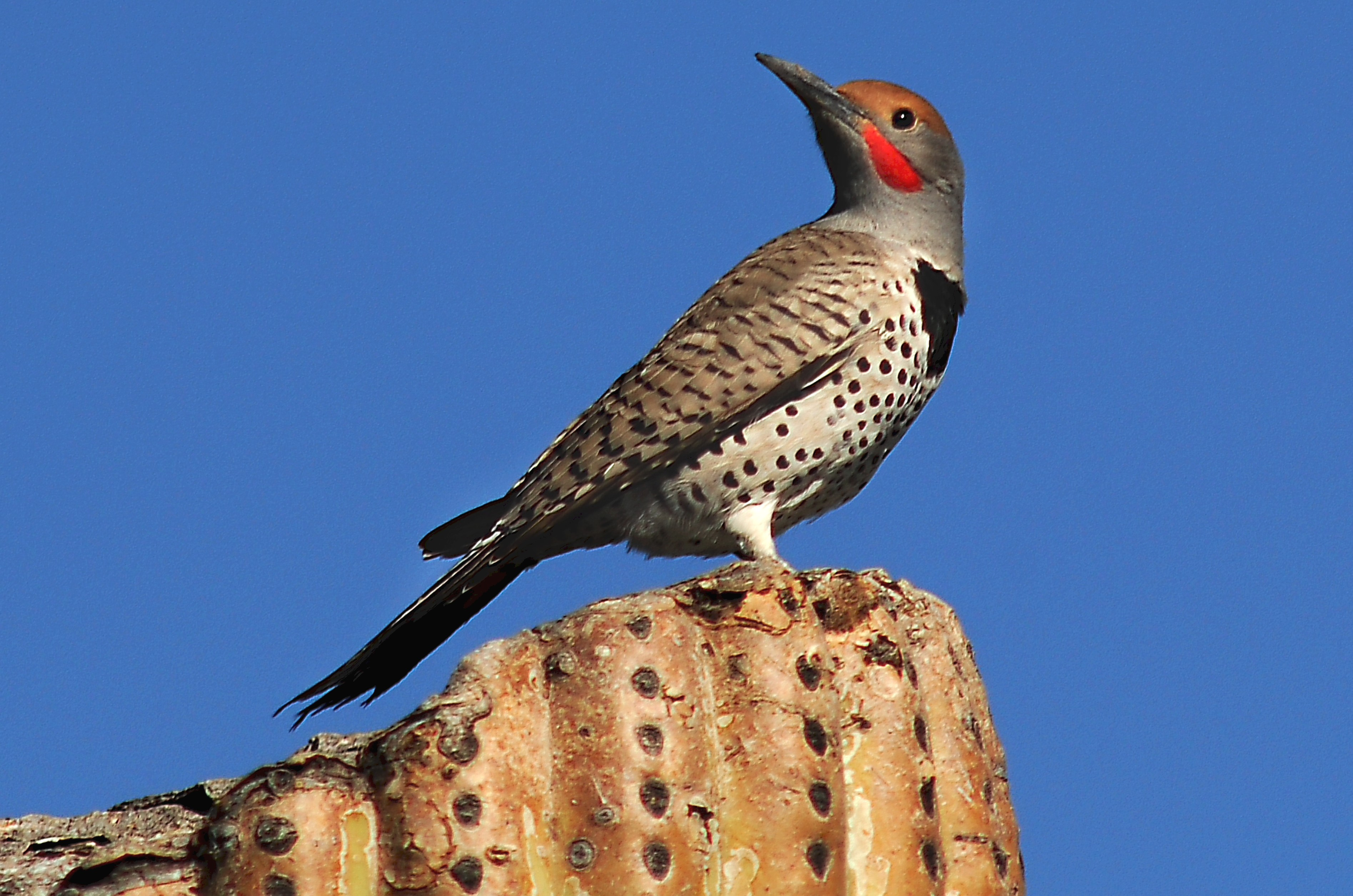
- A male on a cactus

Conservation status
- Least Concern (IUCN 3.1)

- Secure (NatureServe)

Scientific classification
- Kingdom: Animalia
- Phylum: Chordata
- Class: Aves
- Order: Piciformes
- Family: Picidae
- Genus: Colaptes
- Species: C. chrysoides

Binomial name
- Colaptes chrysoides (Malherbe, 1852)
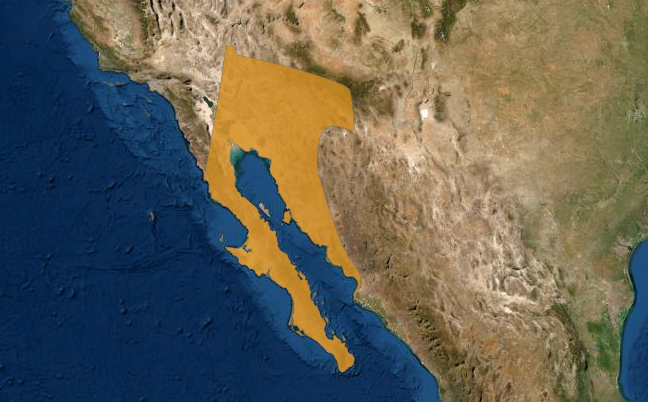
- Range

= Gilded flicker =

North American desert bird C. chrysoides

The gilded flicker (Colaptes chrysoides) is a large woodpecker (mean length of 29 cm (11 in)) of the Sonoran, Yuma, and eastern Colorado Desert regions of the Southwestern United States and northwestern Mexico, including all of the Baja California peninsula except the extreme northwestern region. Yellow underwings distinguish the gilded flicker from the northern flicker (Colaptes auratus) found within the same region, which has red underwings.

== Taxonomy ==
Four subspecies are recognized:

- The Cape gilded flicker (C. c. chrysoides) resides in southern Baja California.
- The brown gilded flicker (C. c. brunnescens) resides in northern and central Baja California.
- Mearns' gilded flicker (C. c. mearnsi) resides in extreme southeastern California to Arizona and northwestern Mexico.
- The Mexican gilded flicker (C. c. tenebrosus) resides in northwestern Mexico from northern Sonora to northern Sinaloa.

== Habitat ==
The gilded flicker most frequently builds its nest hole in a saguaro (Carnegiea gigantea), excavating a nest hole nearer to the top than to the ground. Less frequently, they will also nest in desert dry washes with Frémont's cottonwood (Populus fremontii) or willows (Salix sp.). Cavities in saguaros are excavated one year before they are inhabited. The saguaro defends itself against water loss into the cavity of the nesting hole by secreting sap that hardens into a waterproof structure that is known as a saguaro boot. Northern flickers, on the other hand, nest in riparian trees and very rarely inhabit saguaros. Gilded flickers occasionally hybridize with northern flickers in the narrow zones where their ranges and habitats overlap.

== Diet ==
The gilded flicker's diet mostly consists of ants, as well as other insects such as beetles or termites. They forage on the ground by picking up insects or using their tongues to probe anthills. They also feed on fruits and berries.

== Gallery ==
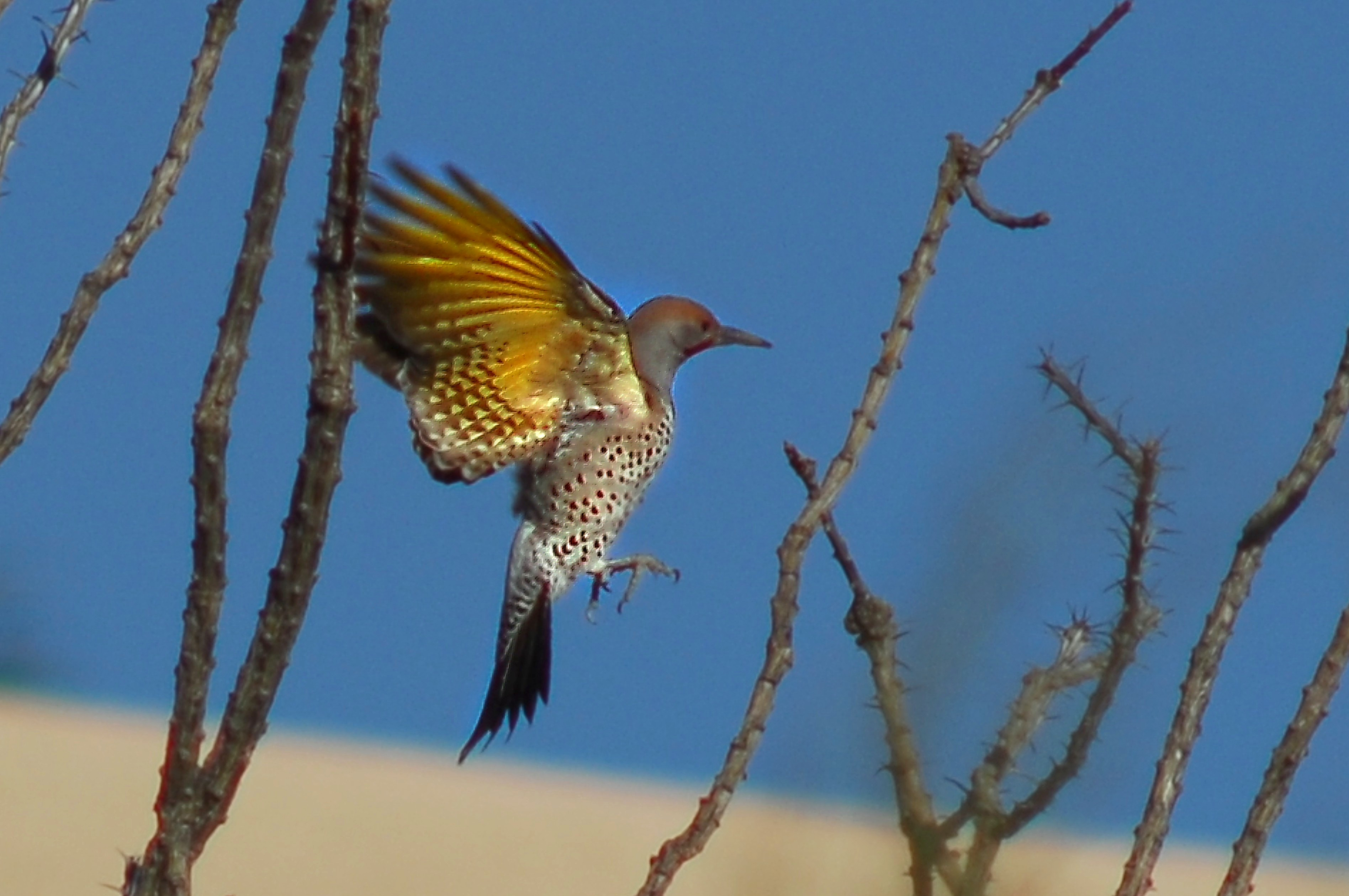
In flight

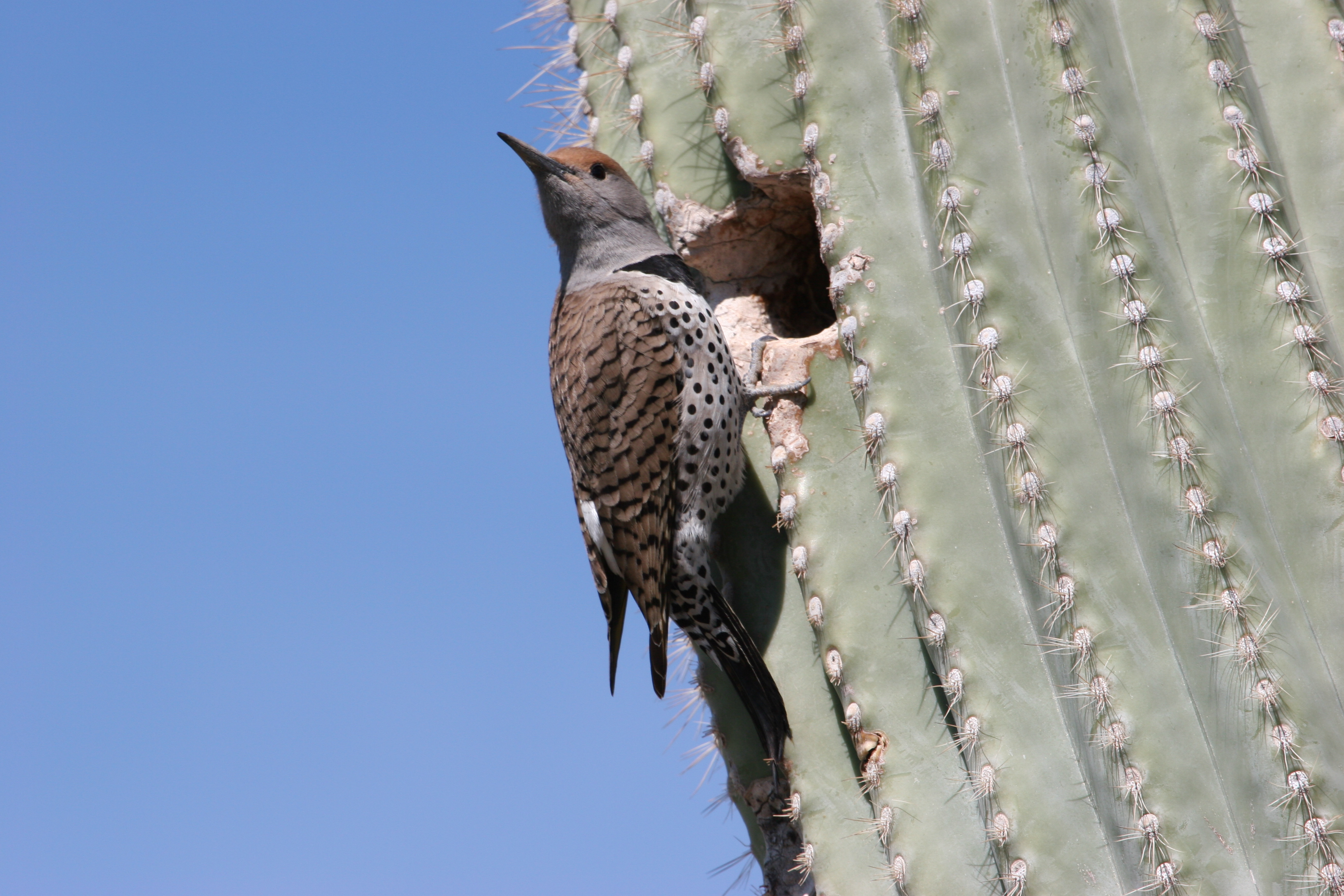
By a nest hole in a saguaro
