= Bosque =

Type of forest found along rivers in the Southwest United States

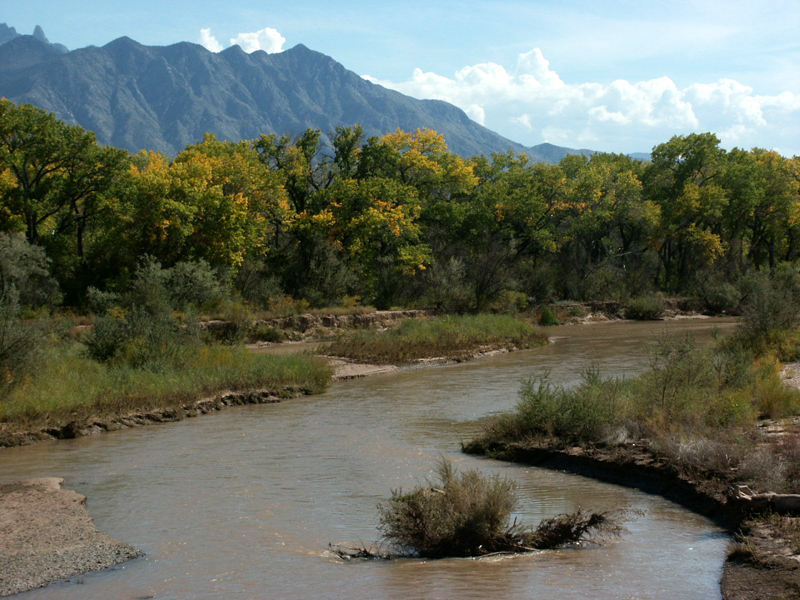
Bosque on the Rio Grande near Bernalillo, New Mexico

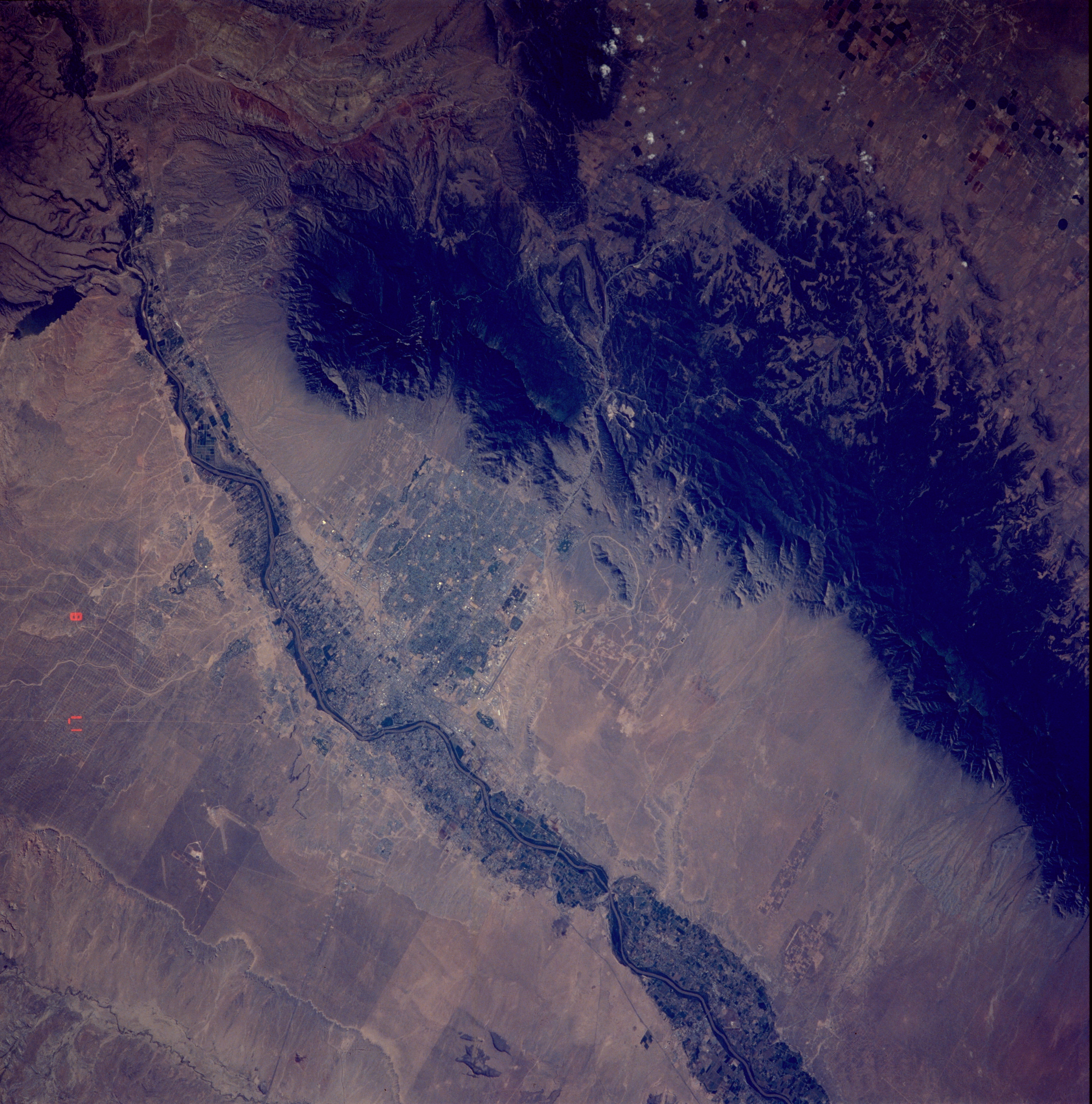
NASA image of Albuquerque, New Mexico showing the green bosque area surrounding the Rio Grande

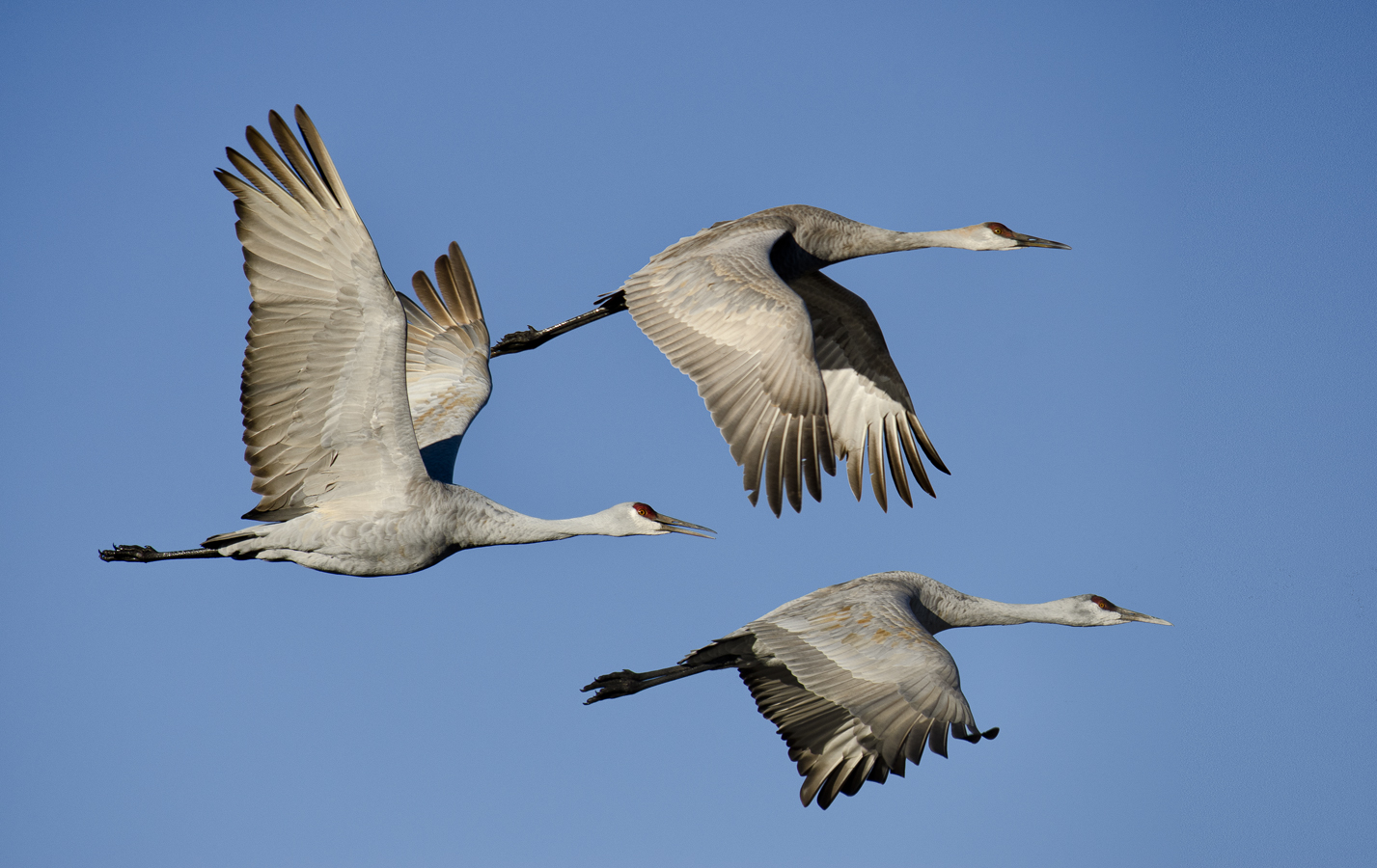
Sandhill Cranes captured in Bosque del Apache National Wildlife Refuge.

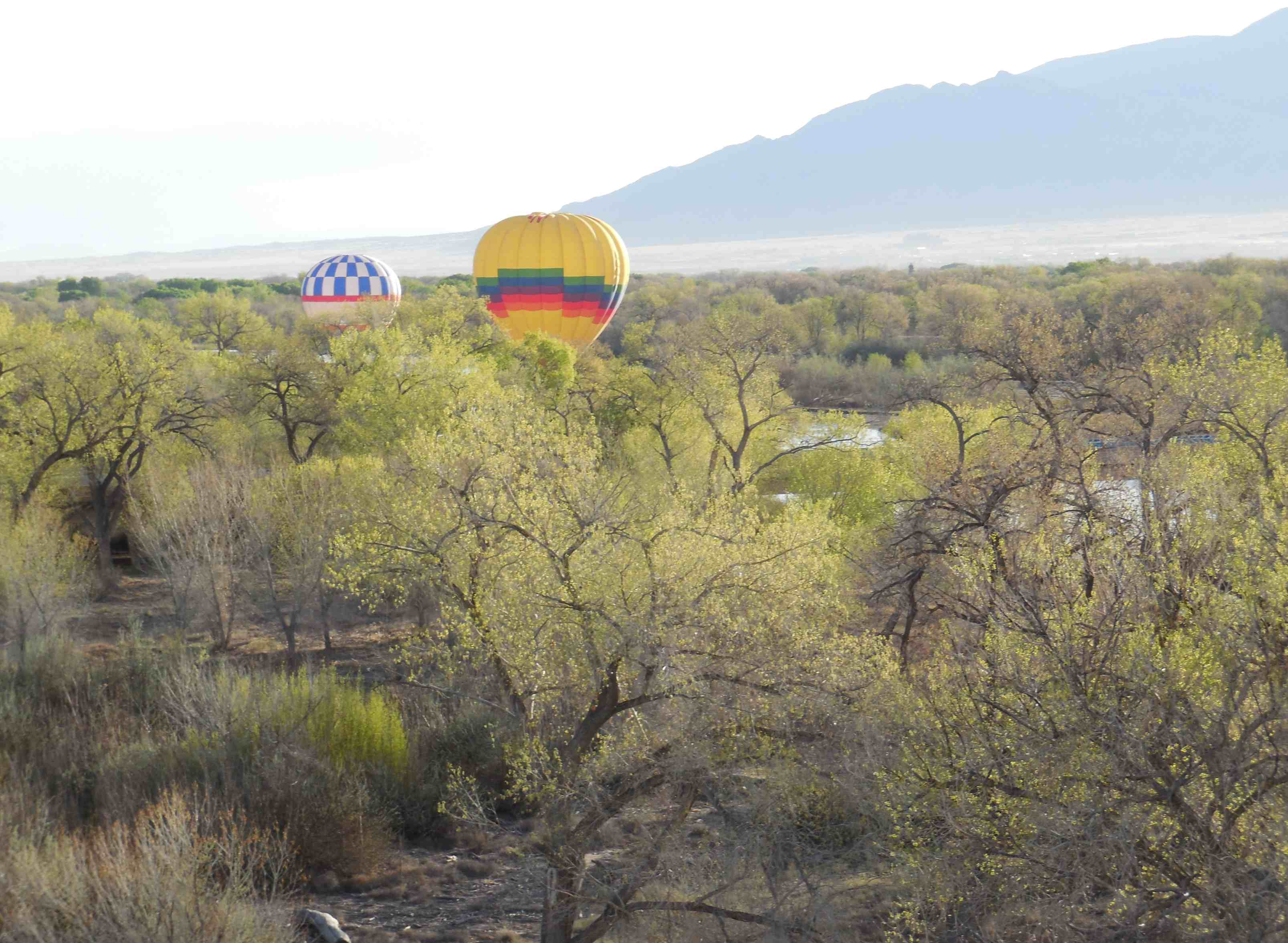
Ballooning through the bosque near the Rio Grande.

A bosque (/ˈboʊskeɪ/ BOH-skay) is a type of gallery forest habitat found along the riparian flood plains of streams, river banks, and lakes. It derives its name from the Spanish word for "forest" ([ˈboske]).

== Setting ==
In the predominantly arid or semiarid Southwestern United States, a bosque is an oasis-like ribbon of green forest, often canopied, that only exists near rivers, streams, or other water courses. The most notable bosque is the 300-mile (500 km)-long forest ecosystem along the valley of the middle Rio Grande in New Mexico that extends from Santa Fe, through Albuquerque and south to El Paso, Texas. One of the most famous and ecologically intact sections of the bosque is included in the Bosque del Apache National Wildlife Refuge, which is located south of San Antonio, NM. Another bosque can be found in Costa Rica, a wildlife refuge named Bosque Alegre.

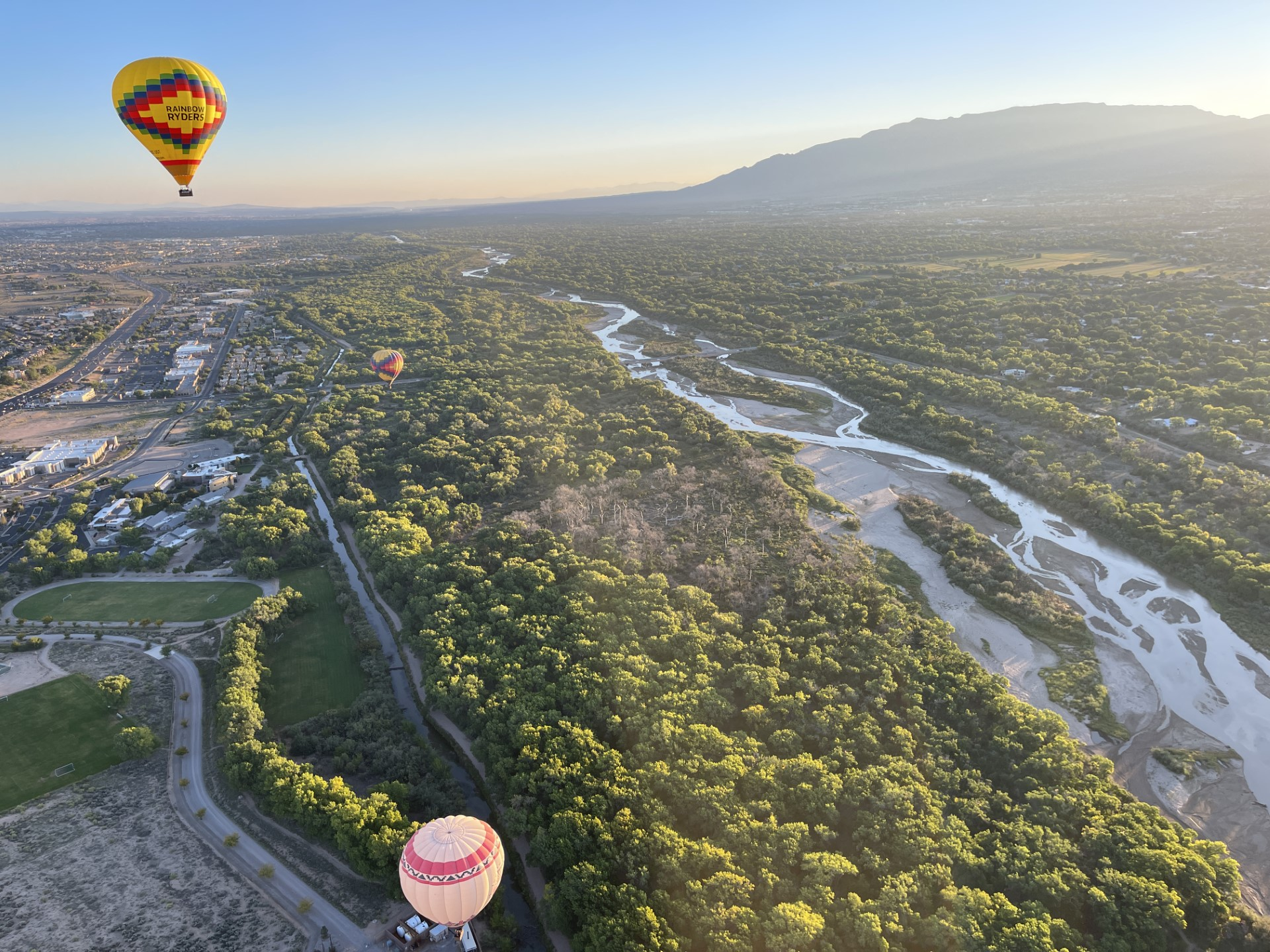
View of the middle Rio Grande bosque near Albuquerque, New Mexico from hot air balloon

== Middle Rio Grande bosque ==
Various refuges, parks, and trails for visitors, such as the Paseo Del Bosque trail are in Albuquerque, New Mexico.

=== Flora and fauna ===
As a desert riparian forest, the middle Rio Grande bosque has a characteristic variety of flora and fauna. Common trees in the bosque habitat include mesquite, cottonwood, desert willow, and desert olive. Because often only a single canopy layer occurs and because the tree species found in the bosque are generally deciduous, a wide variety of shrubs, grasses, and other understory vegetation is also supported. Desert hackberry, blue palo verde, graythorn (Condalia lycioides), Mexican elder (Sambucus mexicana), virgin's bower, and Indian root all flourish in the bosque. The habitat also supports a large variety of lichens. For a semiarid region, a unique biodiversity exists at the interface of the bosque and surrounding desert ecosystems. Certain subsets of vegetative association are defined within the Kuchler scheme, including the mesquite bosque. In 2017, 150 different species of flora (trees, shrubs, forbs, and grasses) were documented in Albuquerque's bosque.

The bosque is an important stopover for a variety of migratory birds, such as ducks, geese, egrets, herons, and sandhill cranes. Year-round avian residents include red-tailed hawks, Cooper's hawks, American kestrels, hummingbirds, owls, woodpeckers, and the southwestern willow flycatcher. Over 270 species of birds can be found in Albuquerque's bosque . Aquatic fauna of the bosque include the endangered Rio Grande silvery minnow. Mammalian residents include desert cottontail, white-footed mouse, North American porcupine, North American beaver, long-tailed weasel, common raccoon, coyote, mountain lion, and bobcat. Cottonwood trees serve as shelter to a variety of animals. A September 2020 report by the Bosque Ecosystem Monitoring Program (BEMP), though, predicted that cottonwood trees in the middle Rio Grande bosque would be impacted disproportionately as climate change affects groundwater depth and as air temperatures rise. The report separately concluded that invasive plant species were not sensitive to such changes in groundwater, suggesting that the plant structure and animal habitats of the middle Rio Grande bosque will change dramatically as the climate changes.

=== Inhabitants ===
Though the earliest inhabitants began to settle around the bosque about 15,000 years ago, they caused only minor ecosystem changes. When rapid population growth and when inhabitants started creating water diversions for farming purposes, the bosque started to be manipulated, and change was noted in the ecosystem.

=== Restoration ===
Maintaining the ecosystem and habitat of the bosque is a difficult and ongoing concern for many. The creation of water diversions, such as levees, ditches, irrigation canals, etc. has resulted in irreparable damage, causing floodplains to dry and water levels to drop. Thus, creating a ripple effect, many different types of native plant species, wildlife, and amphibians have died off or relocated. The drying and loss of wetlands create a land that is susceptible to fires, destroying more habitation areas.

Efforts are ongoing to undo damage to the bosque ecosystem caused by human development, fires, and invasive species in the 20th century. Where possible, levees and other flood-control devices along the Rio Grande are being removed, to allow the river to undergo its natural cycle, but in June 2023, the Army Corps of Engineers-Albuquerque District and the Middle Rio Grande Conservancy District signed a design agreement aiming for the reconstruction of multiple levees along the Rio Grande between Albuquerque and Belen as part of the Middle Rio Grande, Bernalillo to Belen project, which aims to minimize flood damage along the river. To help with the regrowth and maintenance of the bosque, new trees are planted by the Open Space Division.

Since 1996, the Bosque Ecosystem Monitoring Program (BEMP) of the University of New Mexico has worked with local schools on habitat restoration and ecological monitoring within the bosque, as well as raising awareness of the ecological importance of this habitat through educational outreach initiatives. BEMP receives funding from a number of sources, including the federal government. As of 2016, the program maintained 30 permanent sites throughout the middle Rio Grande bosque.

== See also ==
- Flora of New Mexico
- Riparian forest
- Tugay, an analogous forest type in the deserts and steppes of Central Asia
