= Saguaro boot =

Shell of tissue around a nest in a saguaro cactus

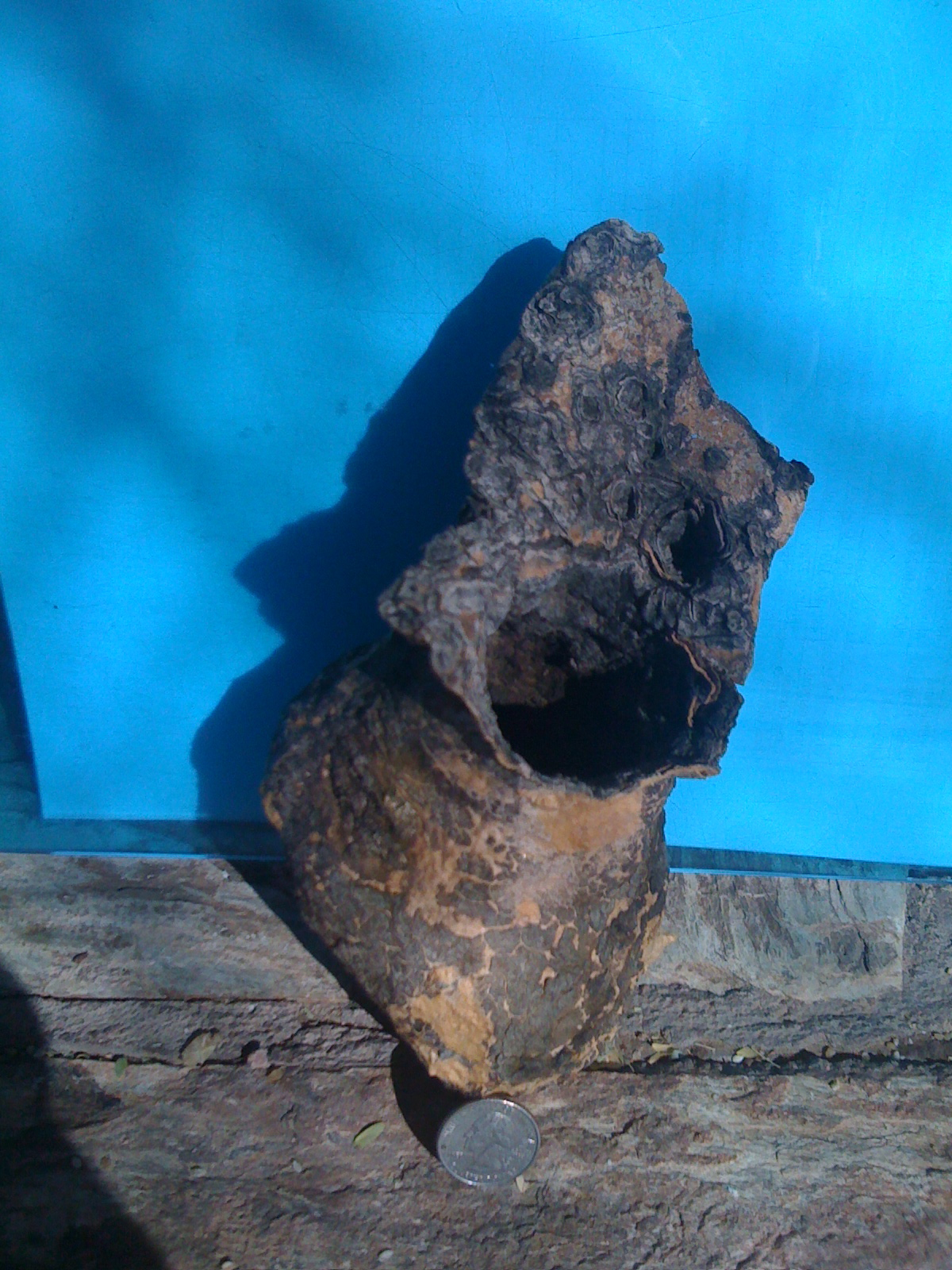
Saguaro boot with US quarter to show scale

A saguaro boot is the hard shell of callus tissue, heavily impregnated with lignin, that a saguaro cactus (Carnegiea gigantea) creates to protect the wound created by a bird's nesting house. The bird pecks through the cactus skin, then excavates downward to hollow out a space for its nest. When the saguaro dies, its soft flesh rots, but its woody infrastructure lasts much longer. So does the hollowed-out callus whose roughly boot-like shape gives it the name of "saguaro boot."

Several different kinds of birds create nest holes in saguaro cactus. The Gila woodpecker (Melanerpes uropygialis) creates small holes (about 5 cm across) at midlevel on the cactus, where the ribs are far apart, feeding on larvae under the cactus skin. The larger gilded flicker (Colaptes chrysoides) drills bigger holes higher up, where ribs are close together, because its beak is strong enough to break through rib tissue.

The saguaro responds to the bird's damaging its tissue by secreting a resinous sap that, over time, hardens into a bark-like shell that prevents the cactus from losing fluid and also protects the nest hole by making it waterproof. The bird's nesting hole requires not only the bird's making a hole but also the cactus's lining the hole - it is not ready for use as a nest until a year after its creation. Many saguaros are home to multiple nests; if birds excavate adjoining hollows, a saguaro boot may be formed with more than one opening.

Native Americans of the Seri group used saguaro boots to store or carry water. It is now illegal to collect saguaro boots from the wild in Arizona.

Some desert moth caterpillars also make tunnels inside saguaro cactus. The resulting dried callus that forms around their tunnels has a flattened disk structure where the caterpillar exits instead of the larger hole seen on a saguaro boot.

== Gallery ==
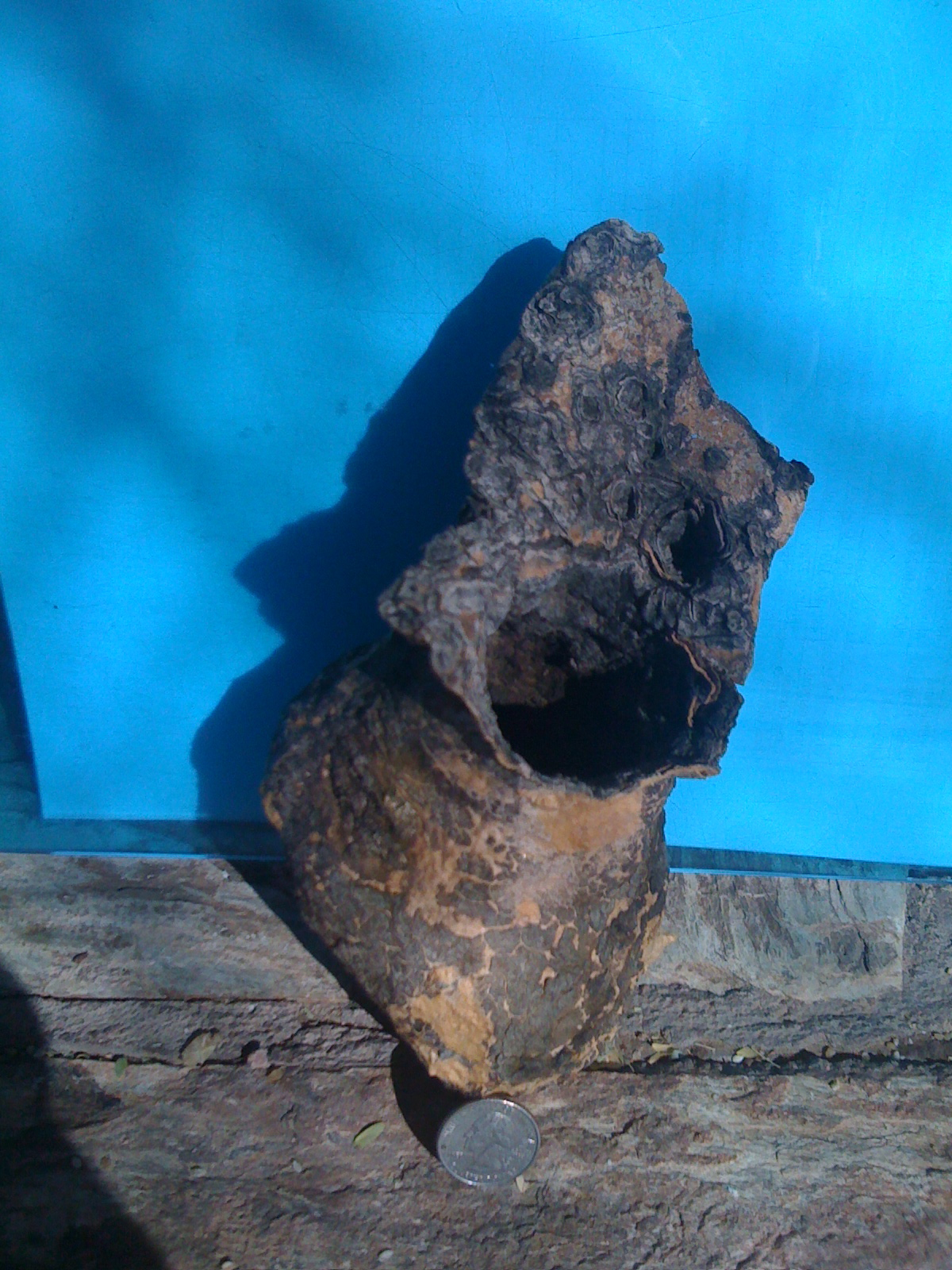
Saguaro boot with US quarter to show scale

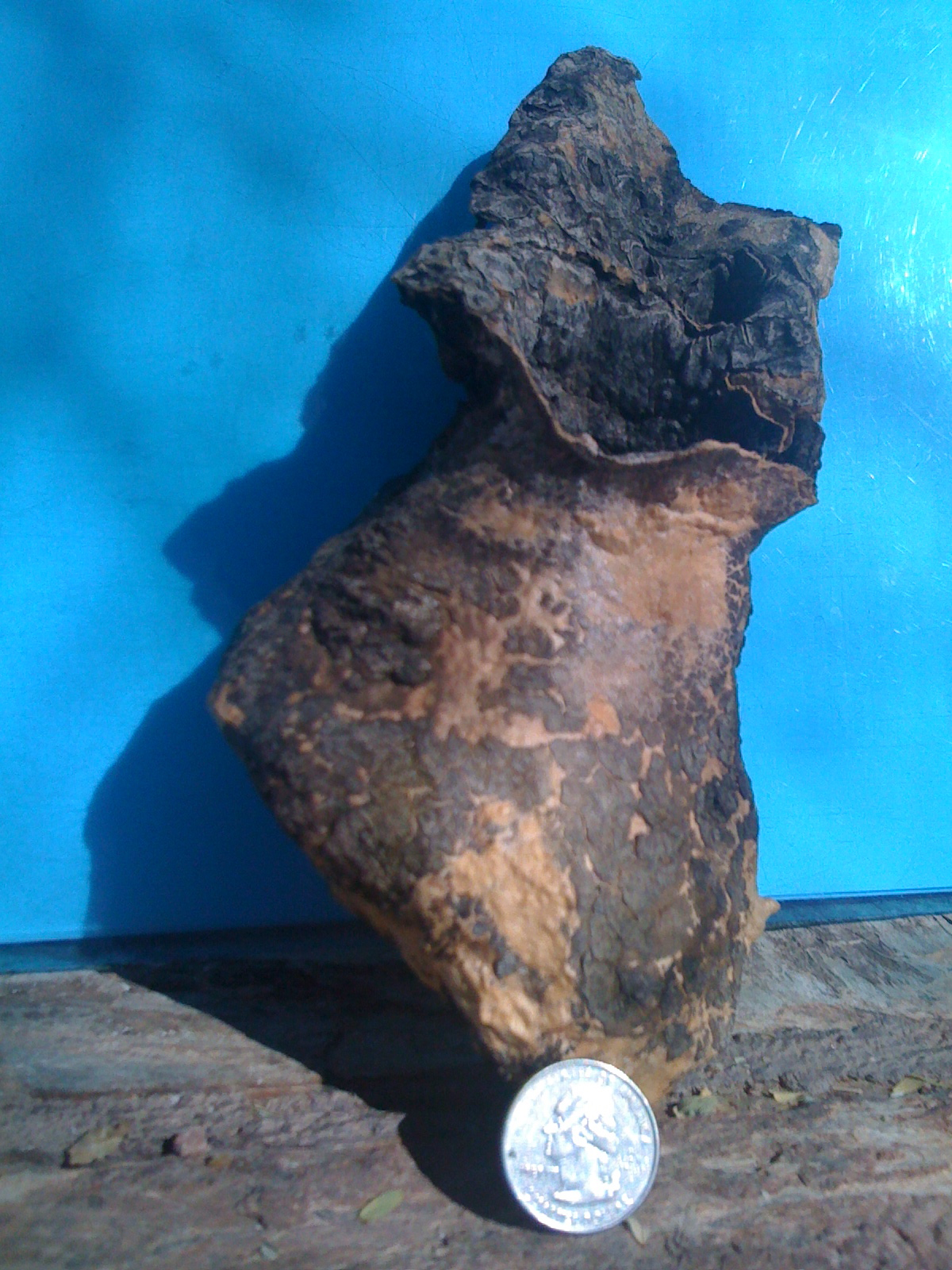
Slightly different viewpoint of same saguaro boot

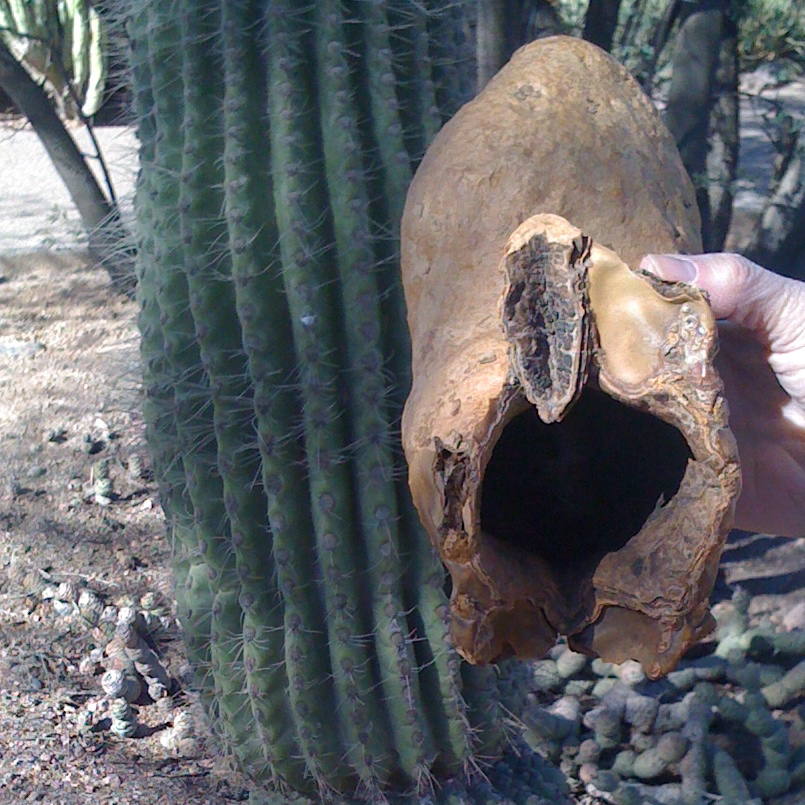
Saguaro boot with saguaro. Boot toe should point down, not up.

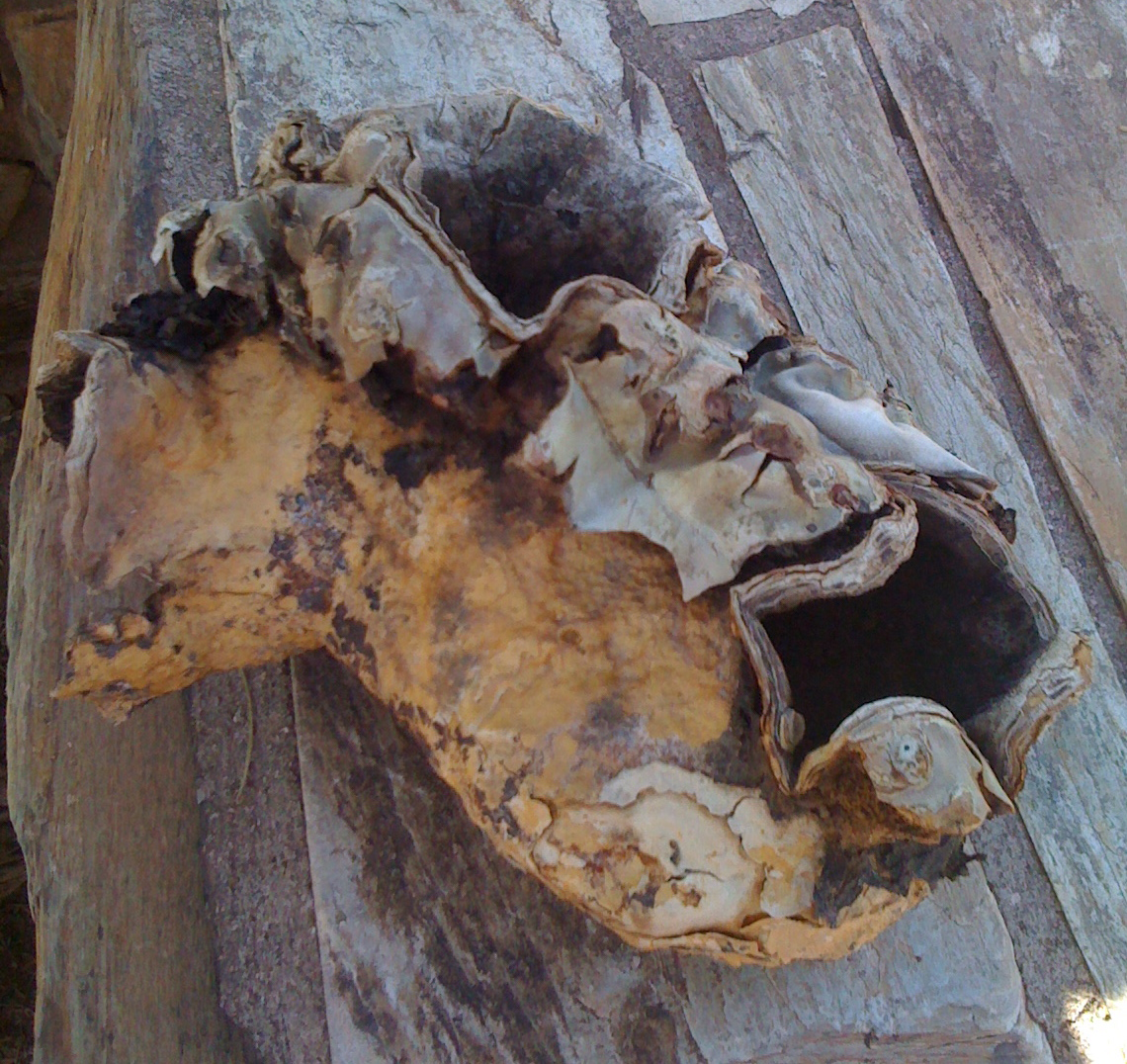
Three nest-holes united into one saguaro boot

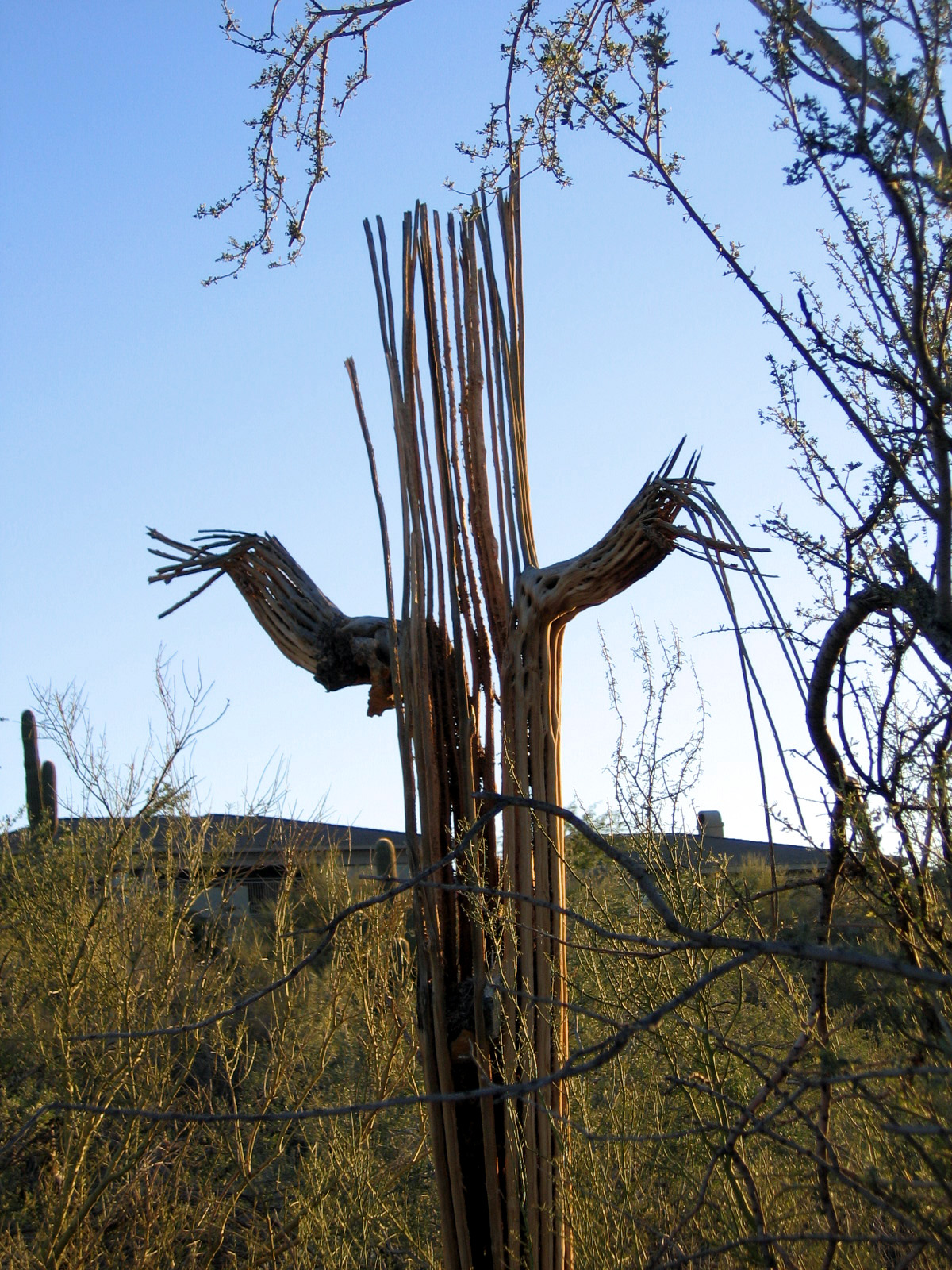
The bare wooden ribs of a dead saguaro

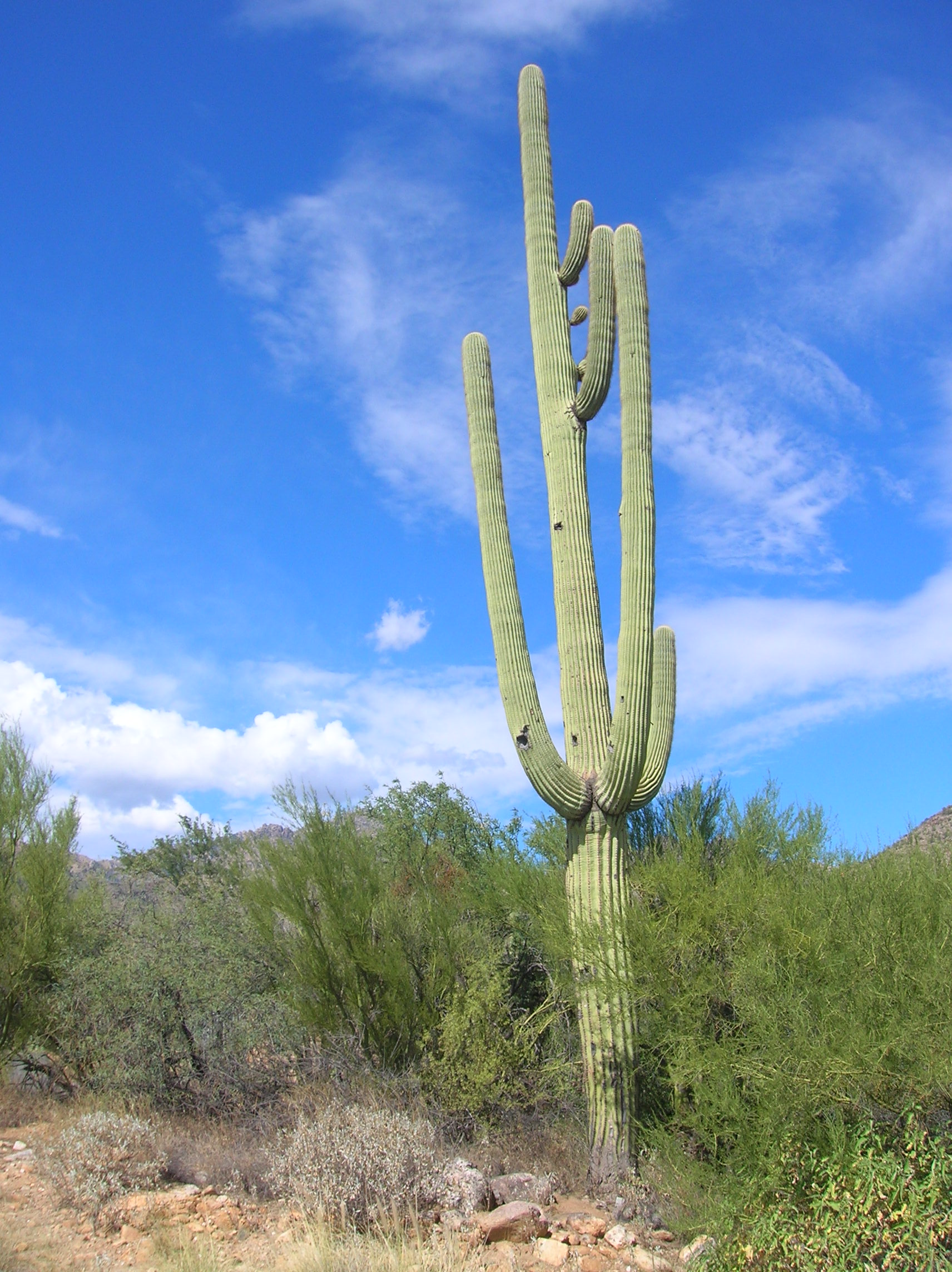
Saguaro with nest holes

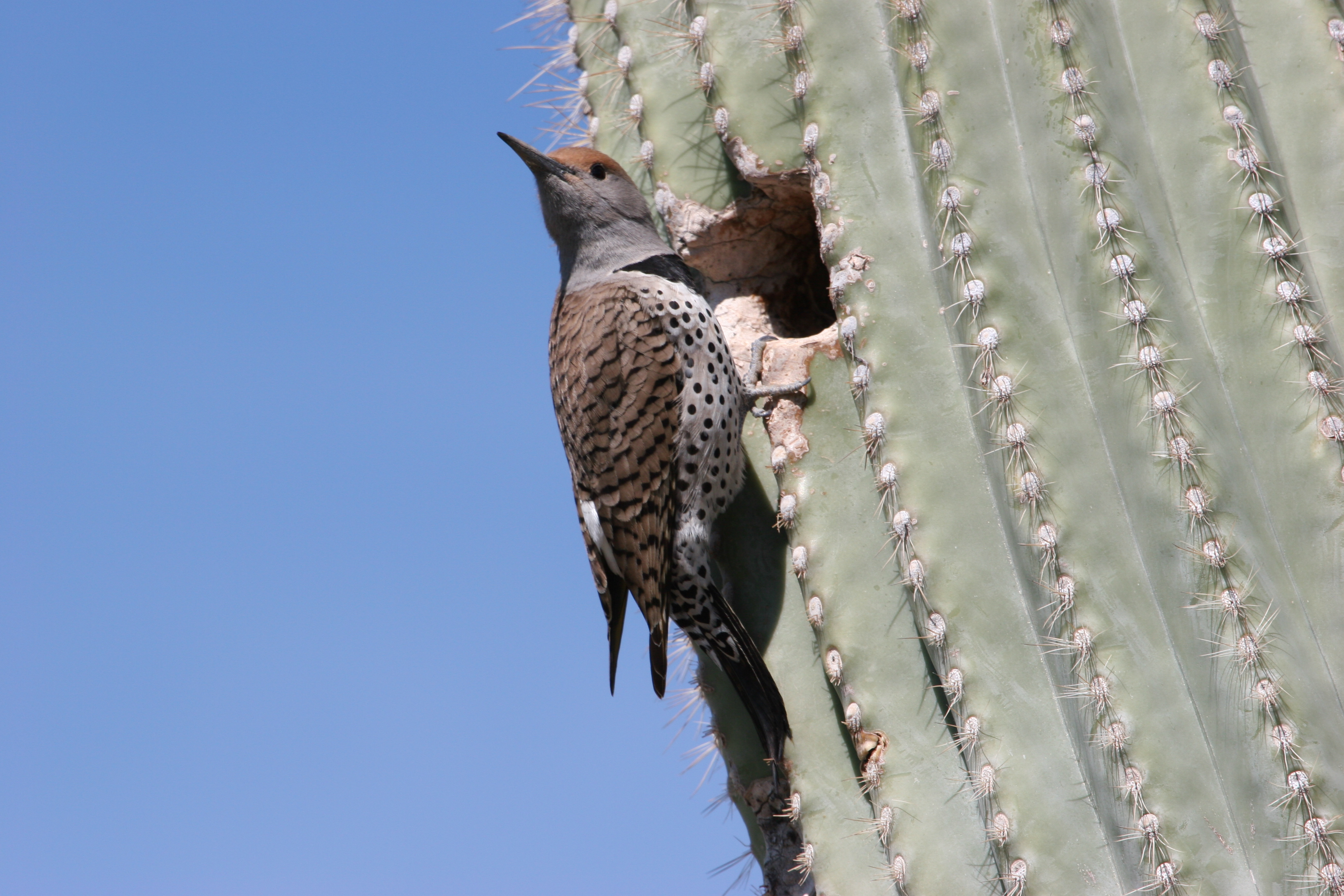
Gilded flicker by nest hole in saguaro cactus

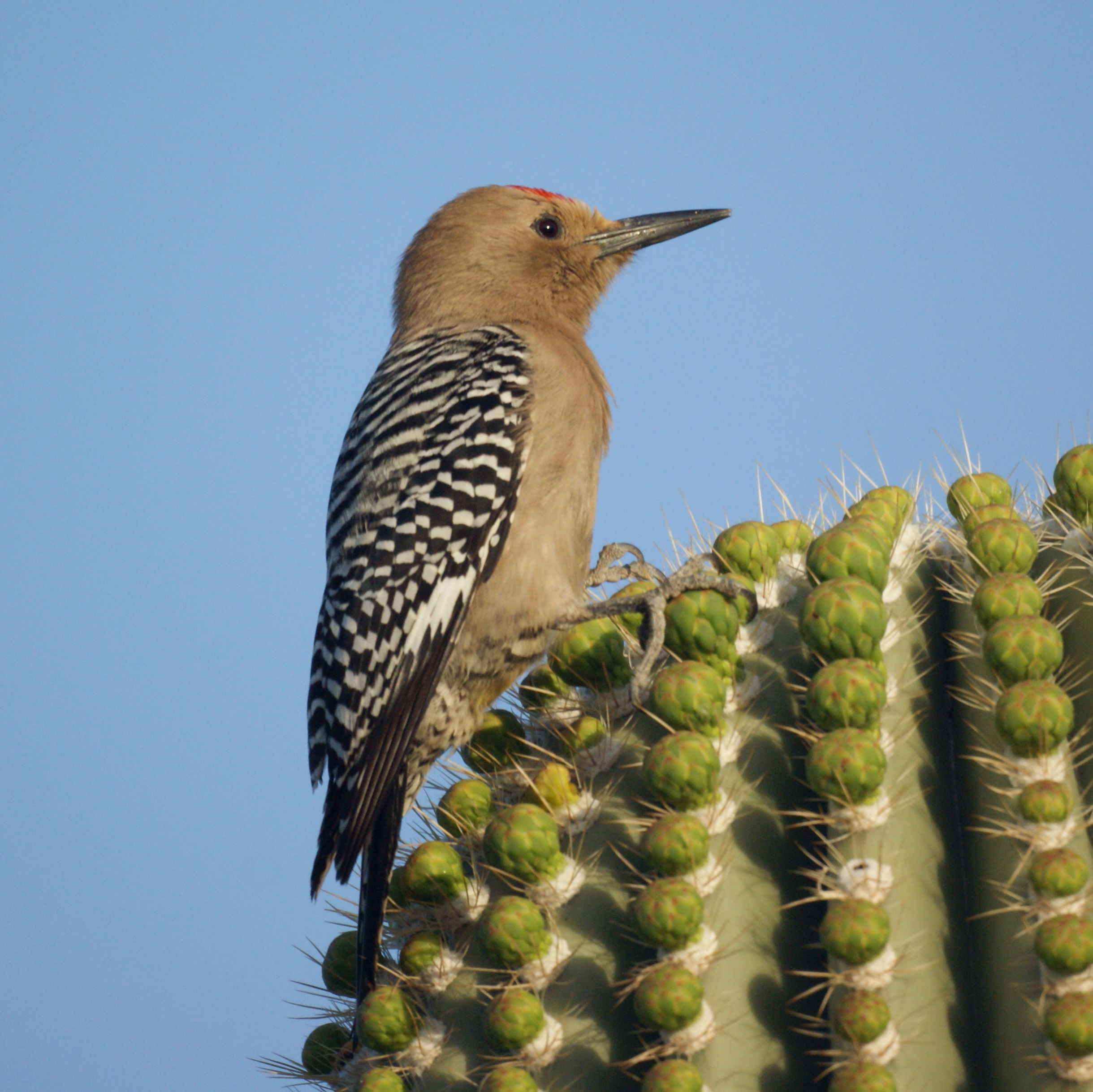
Gila woodpecker on cactus

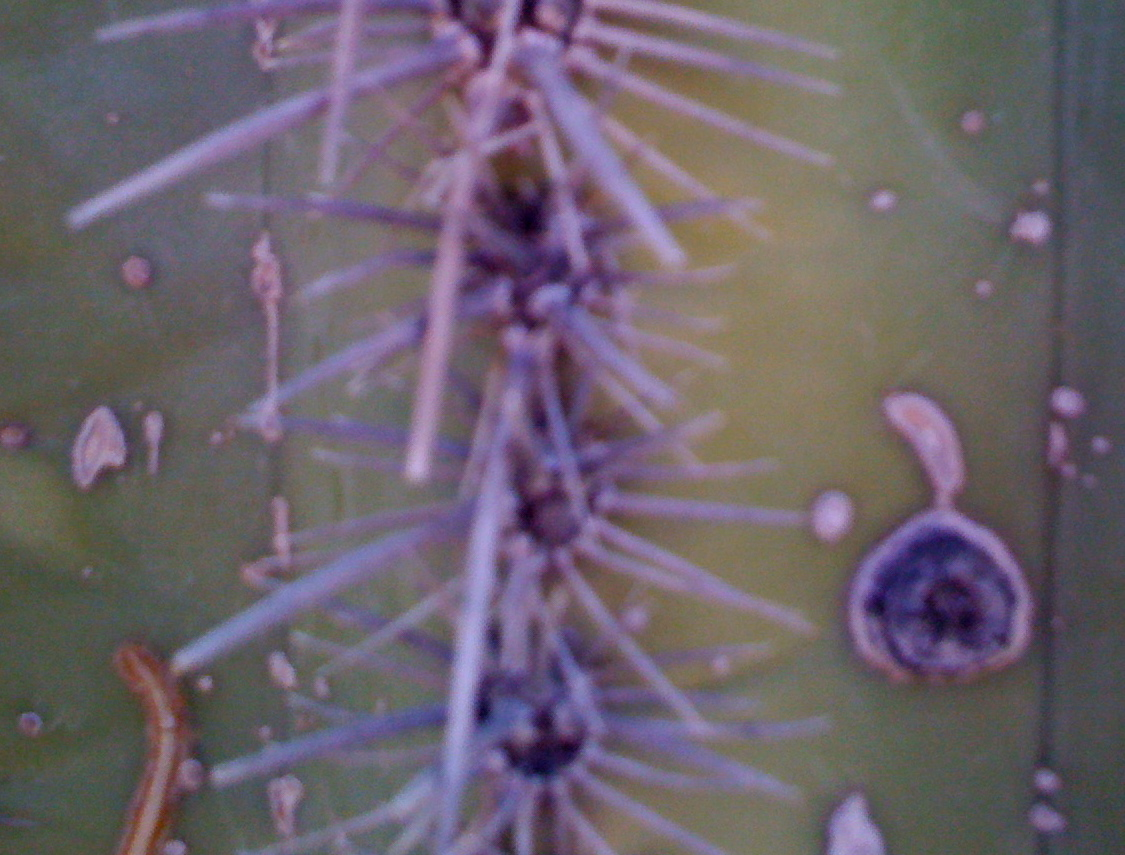
Saguaro with dime-sized rosette from caterpillar exit hole

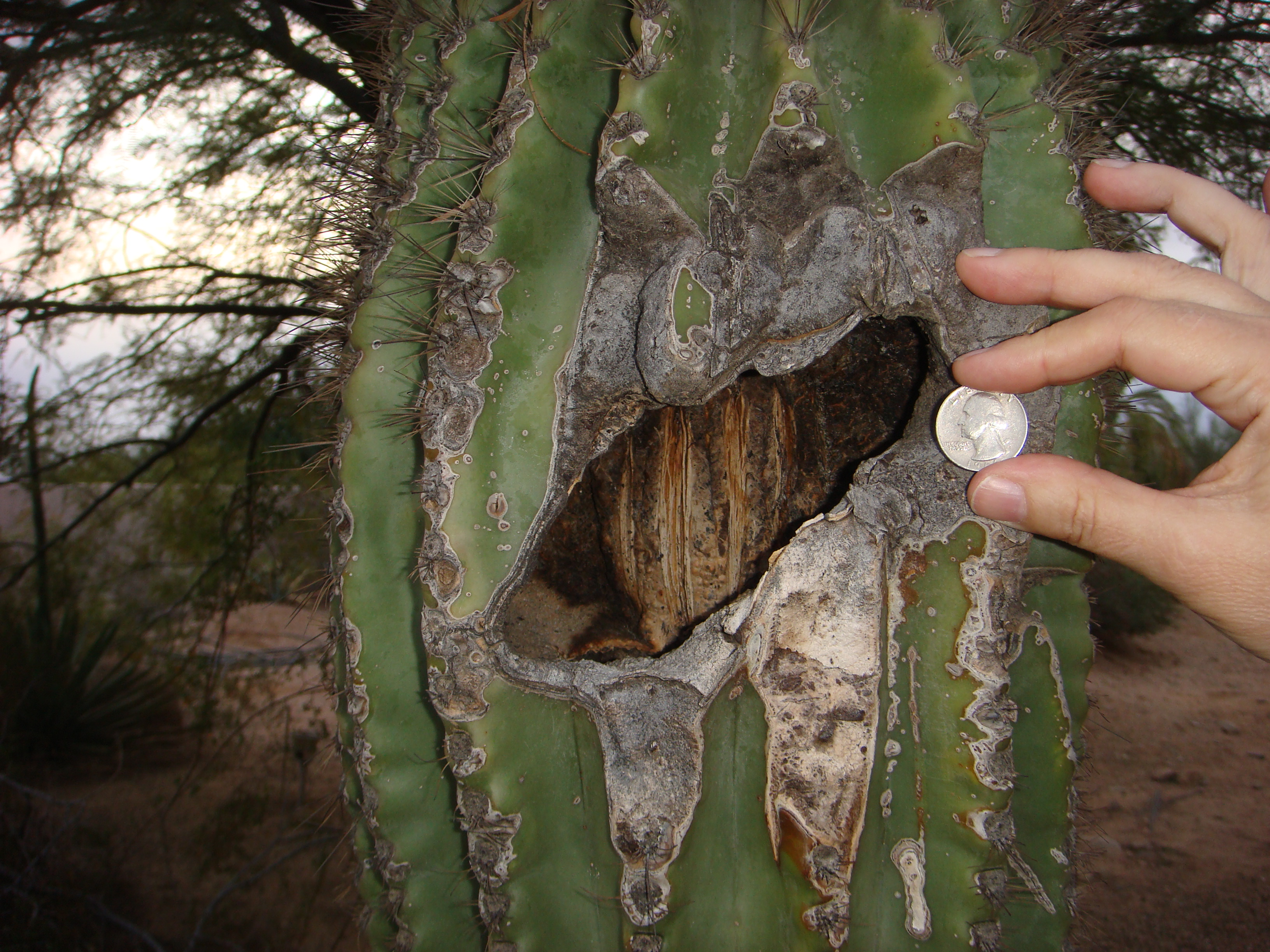
Close-up of living saguaro with hole, wound-response lignin, quarter shown for scale

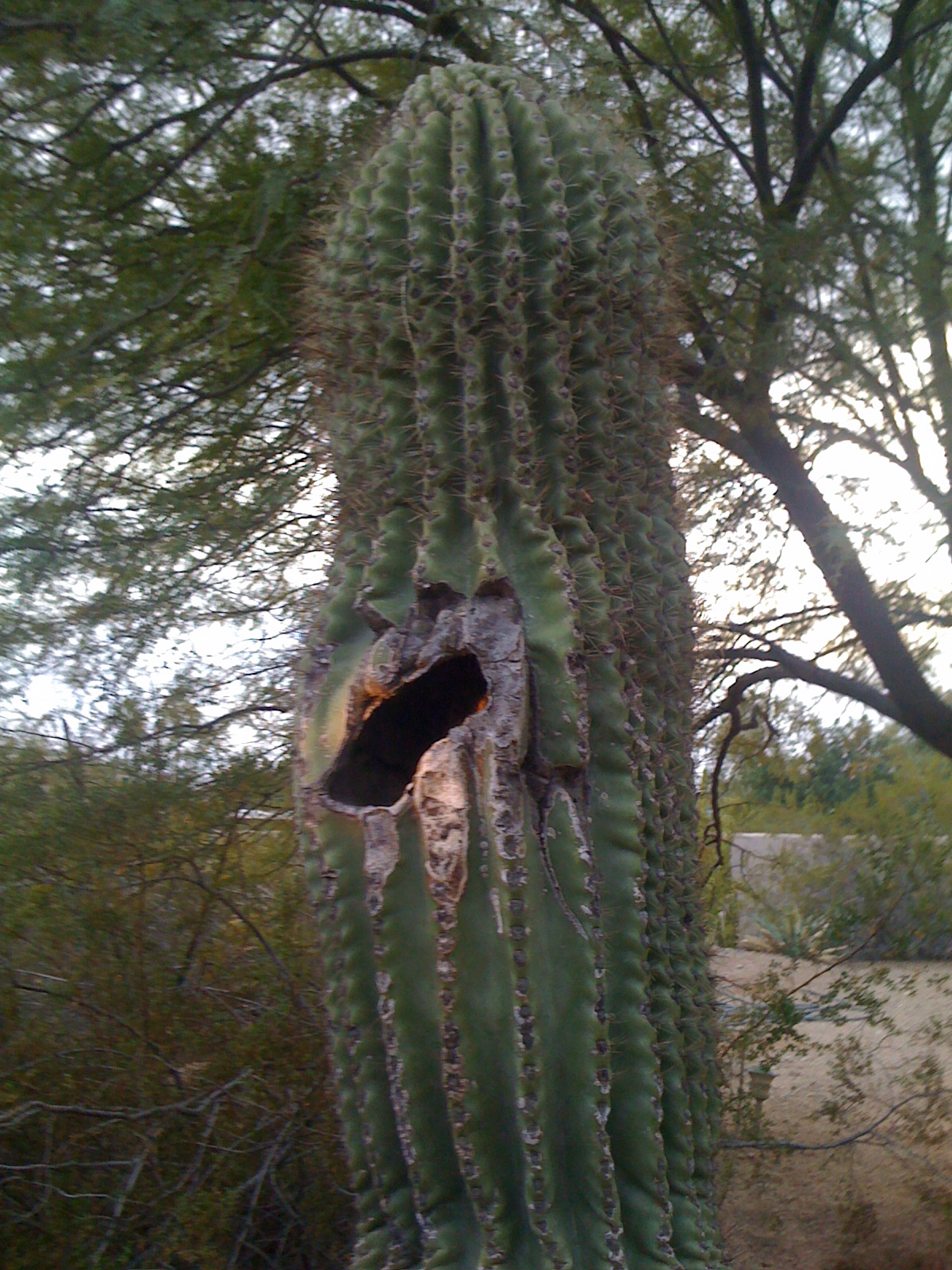
Longer view of living saguaro with hole seen in previous close-up

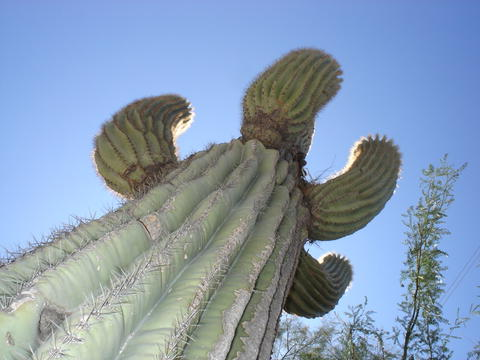
Looking up a saguaro
