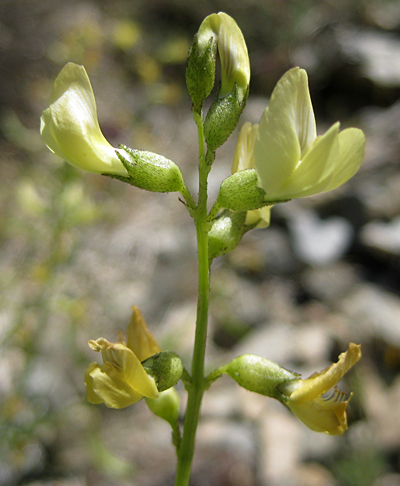

Conservation status
- Endangered (ESA)

Scientific classification
- Kingdom: Plantae
- Clade: Embryophytes
- Clade: Tracheophytes
- Clade: Angiosperms
- Clade: Eudicots
- Clade: Rosids
- Order: Fabales
- Family: Fabaceae
- Subfamily: Faboideae
- Genus: Astragalus
- Species: A. tricarinatus

Binomial name
- Astragalus tricarinatus A.Gray

= Astragalus tricarinatus =

Species of legume

Astragalus tricarinatus is a rare species of milkvetch known by the common name triplerib milkvetch, or triple-ribbed milkvetch.

It is endemic to California, where it can be found in the region where the San Bernardino Mountains meet the Mojave Desert and the Colorado Desert. It grows in desert scrub and expanses of rock litter amongst stands of Joshua trees. The plant is known from only one location and there were twenty individuals remaining there in 1998, when it was federally listed as an endangered species.

== Description ==
This is a perennial herb growing in clumps up to about 25 cm (9.8 in) tall. The leaves are up to 20 cm (7.9 in) long and made up of several silvery-green hairy leaflets. The inflorescence holds 5 to 15 cream-colored flowers each about 2 cm (0.79 in) in length.

The fruit is a flat legume pod up to about 4 cm (1.6 in) long. The pod is curved and has three distinct ribs.
