= Flora of the Arizona Upland =

Higher elevation Sonora Desert plants

Flora of the Arizona Upland includes higher elevation Sonora Desert plants that require more moisture and cooler climates than those of the adjacent Sonoran Desert areas in the Colorado Desert of the lower Colorado River valley area, and which can withstand frost, unlike plants of the Sonoran Desert south of the border between the United States and Mexico.

== Environmental influences ==
The Arizona Upland receives between 12 and 15 inches of annual precipitation, of which half falls in the summer monsoons. Cold air collects in the valleys. Less cold tolerant species grow on the warmer slopes above.

== Characteristics ==
The flora of the Arizona Upland is characterized by a rich association of large and small cacti and succulents, trees, shrubs, perennials and annuals. Plants must be frost tolerant, which distinguishes the flora from that of adjacent areas of the Sonora Desert.

== Taxa and diversity ==
=== Cacti and succulents ===
Cactaceae Family members include the tall Saguaro (Carnegiea gigantea) on warmer slopes above the valleys.

Following rains, Ocatillo (Fouquieria splendens) adds bright red flowers high up on the tips of multiple tall stems rising from the base.

=== Trees ===
There are extensive stands of Velvet Mequite (Prosopis velutina), in the Legume Family (Fabaceae).
