= Desert riparian =

Vegetation type in America

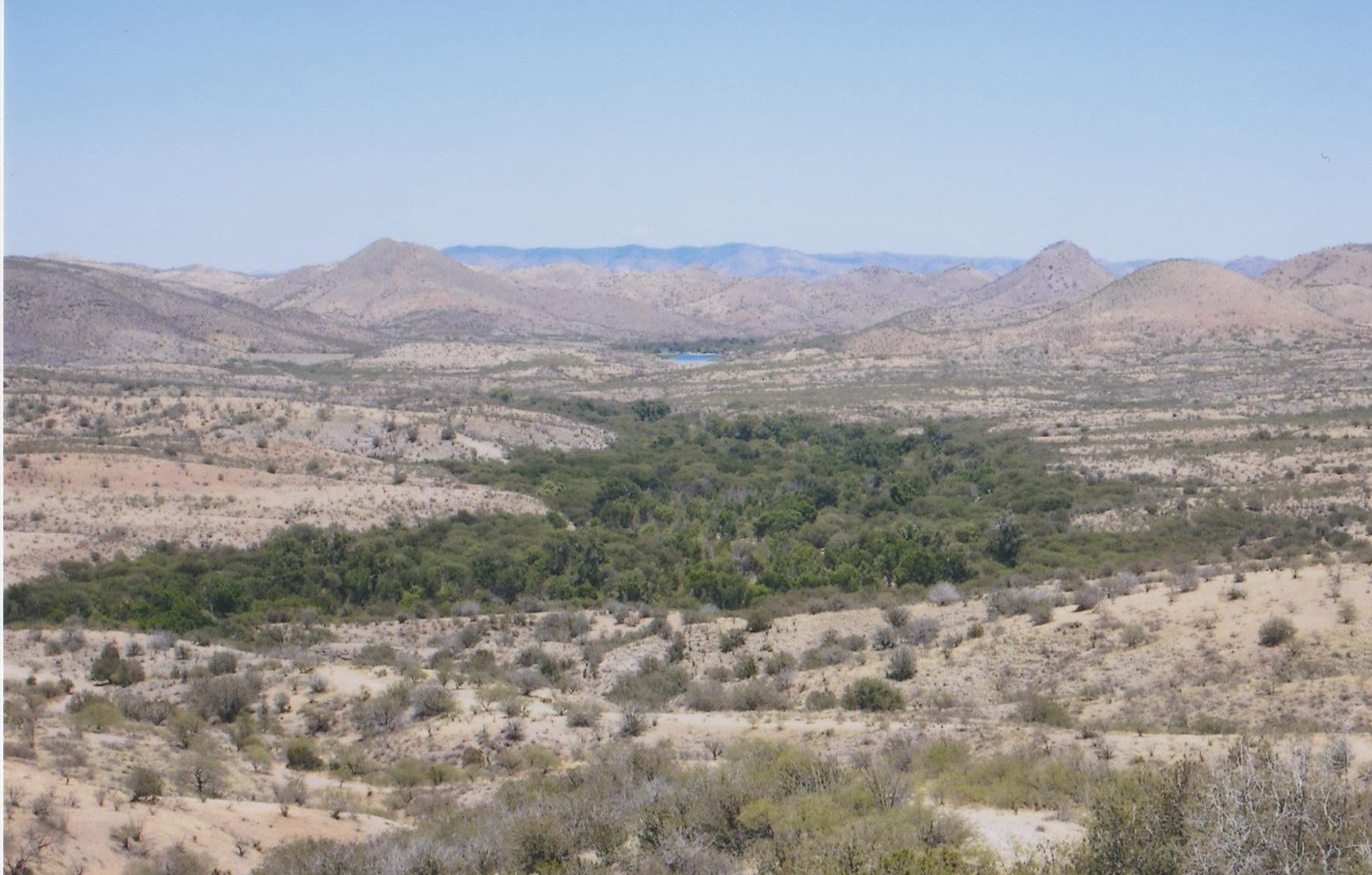
The Sonoita Creek riparian forest in southern Arizona, United States, surrounded by rugged high desert terrain

Desert riparian is a North American desert vegetation type (or biome) occurring in the bottoms of valleys, canyons, and other watercourses that have water at or near the surface most of the year. The visual character is of large, lush, perennial green trees surrounded by dry desert vegetation and soil coloration. The area may be in a patch surrounding a spring such as an oasis, or in a strand following the course of water flow, such as a bosque. The soil in this biome is typically moist and ranges from rocky and sandy to silty alluvium. This biome has seasonal variation, with hot, dry summers and cool, moist winters. Precipitation mostly occurs during the winter, and ranges from 8 to 25 cm each year. It is contrasted with the desert dry wash vegetation type, in which water at or near the surface is lacking most of the year, such as arroyos.

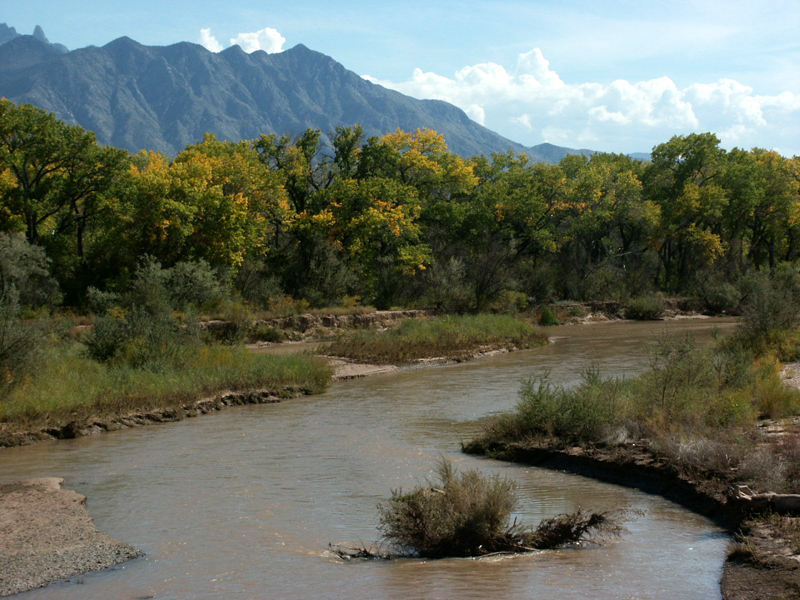
Bosque desert riparian woodland along the Rio Grande in New Mexico, United States

Over 80% of known desert wildlife species use desert riparian areas. Common dominant species include Fremont cottonwood (Populus fremontii), Rio Grande cottonwood (P. deltoides wislizeni), velvet ash (Fraxinus velutina), arroyo willow (Salix lasiolepis), Goodding's willow (Salix gooddingii), red willow (Salix laevigata), California fan palm (Washingtonia filifera), and invasive species such as salt cedar (Tamarix ramosissima), giant reed (Arundo donax), and Russian olive (Elaeagnus angustifolia). Salt cedar and Russian olive are particularly causing problems for this ecosystem because they are able to extract water more efficiently than native cottonwoods and willows, can quickly regrow from a ground-level stump if cut down, grows woody thorns up to 3 inches long, and produce fruits favored by birds. Many of these noninvasive non-native species may also be found because springs and surface water areas in the desert often were old homesites where such species were intentionally planted, such as elm, black locust, and assorted fruit trees.

The desert riparian plays a large role in the populations of wildlife that inhabit it. Several bird species live within the shrubs, including the American Dipper, Belted Kingfisher, Lesser Scaup, and Flycatchers, including the critically endangered southwest willow flycatcher. The cover provided by the Riparian vegetation provides a suitable environment for the dispersal of birds. Riparian forests store limiting nutrients such as nitrogen and phosphate, and plays an important role in nutrient cycling. The riparian vegetation decreases erosion and improves water quality by trapping pollutants.

== See also ==
- Bosque
- Riparian-zone restoration
