= Desert dry wash =

Type of North American desert vegetation

Desert dry wash is a North American desert vegetation type (or biome) occurring in the flat bottoms of canyons and drainages that lack water at or near the surface most of the year, and are subject to periodic severe flooding events. Desert dry wash is contrasted with desert riparian vegetation, which occurs in desert canyons and drainages where there is year-round water at or near the surface. Plants must either be able to survive the severe flooding conditions or be able to reestablish themselves before the next flooding event. Some of these plants have evolved so that in order for their seeds to germinate, the seeds must be scarified or abraded by tumbling sand, gravel, and rocks during the flooding event. They must then quickly send down roots deep enough to be able to tap into deep underground water reserves, in order to survive the dry period after the flooding. Common dominant species of the desert dry wash include smoke tree (Psorothamnus spinosus), desert willow (Chilopsis linearis), catclaw (Senegalia greggii), cheesebush (Ambrosia salsola), and waterweed (Baccharis sergiloides).

== Gallery ==
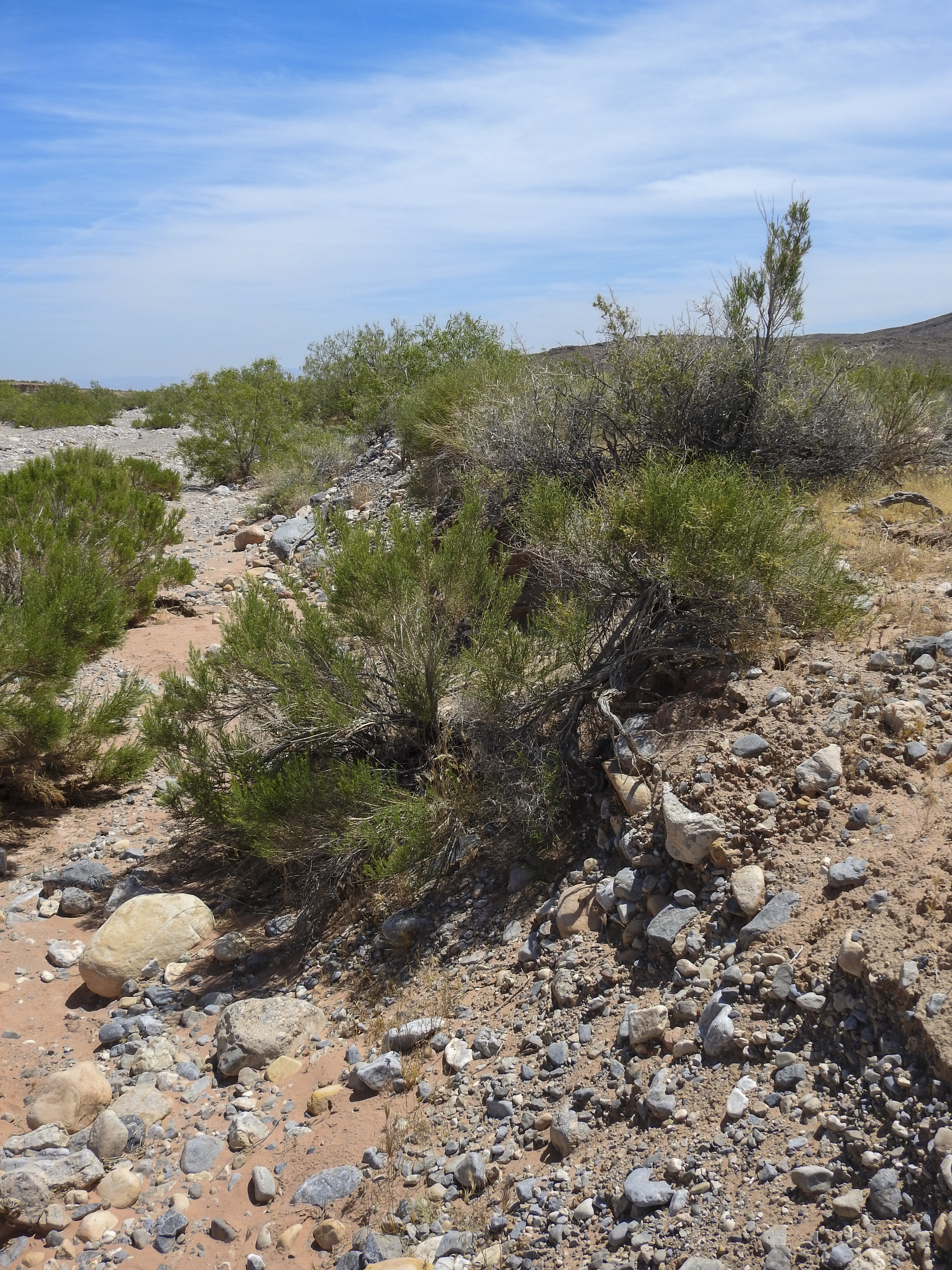
Dry wash bank vegetation (Baccharis sarothroides)

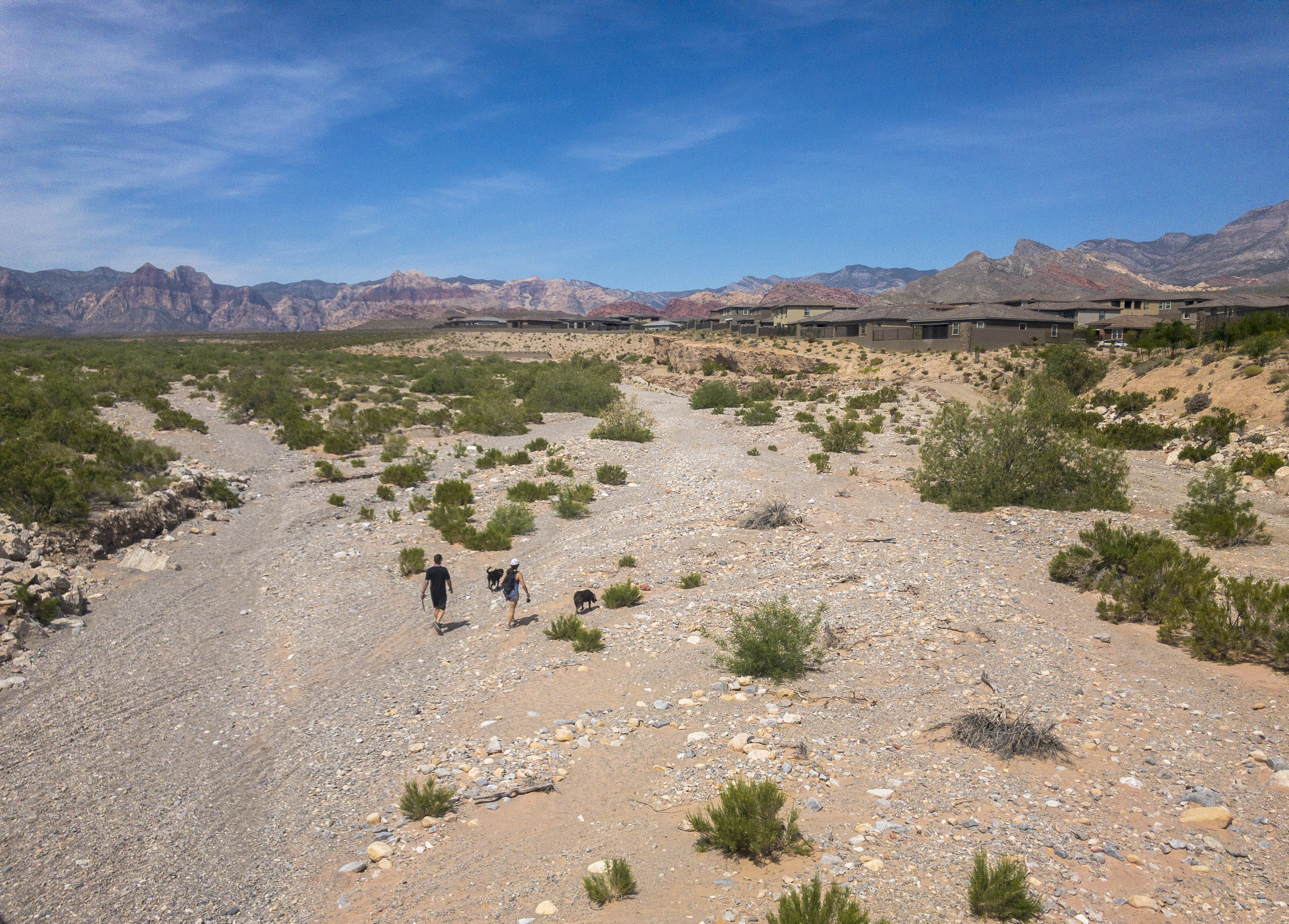
Looking at Red Rock Wash

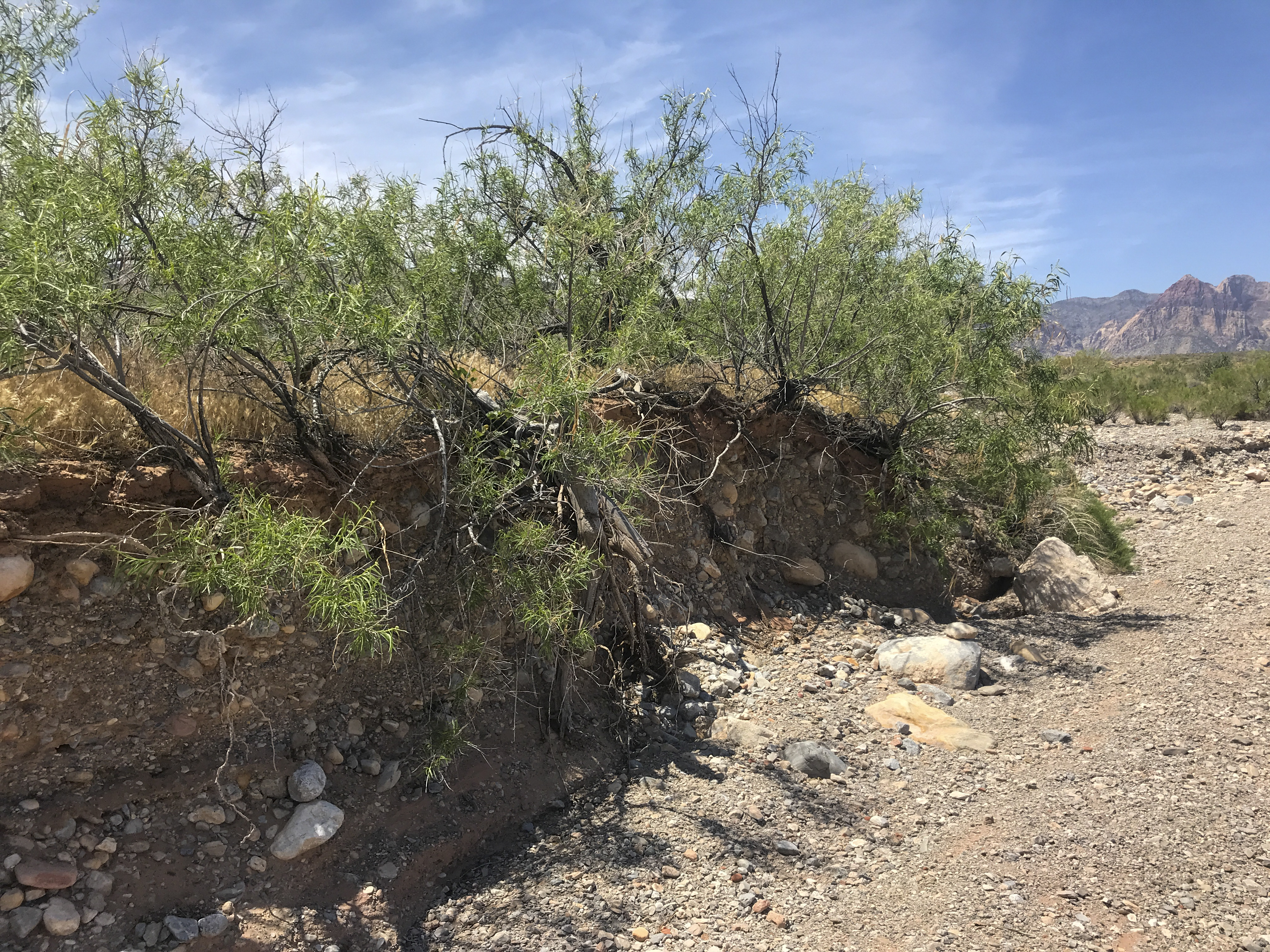
Vegetation on dry wash bank

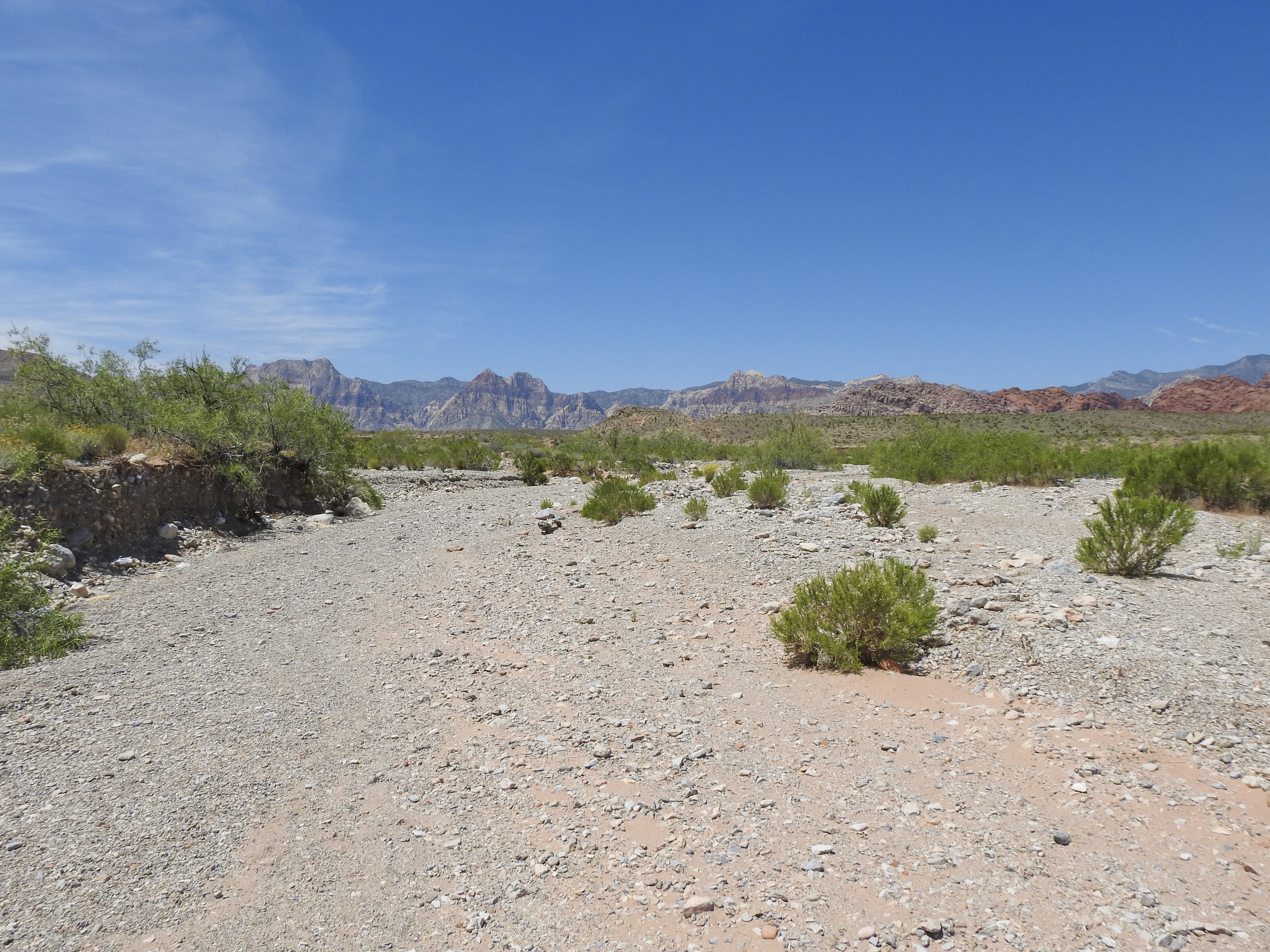
Desert wash streamed.

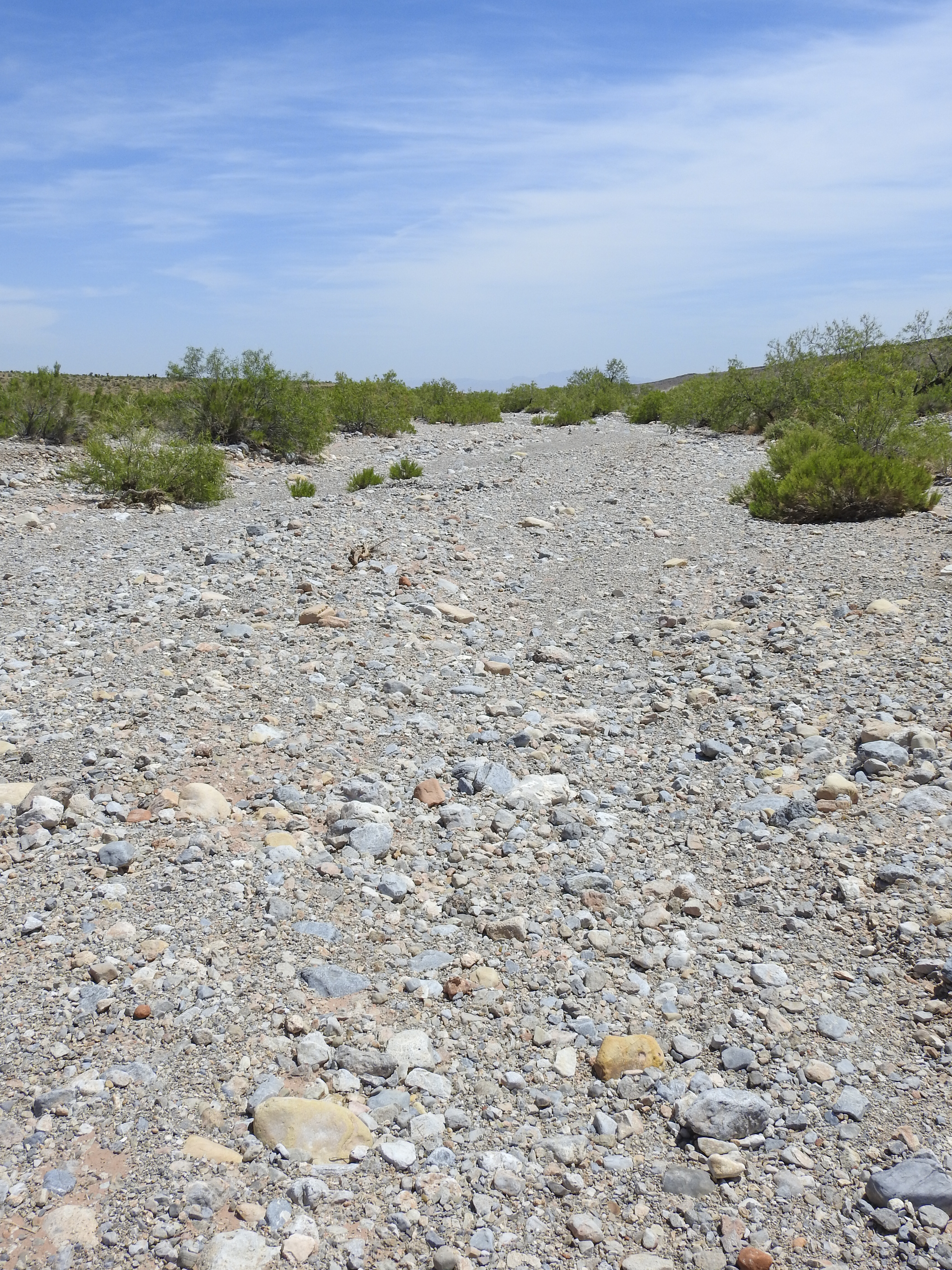
Dry desert wash stream bed

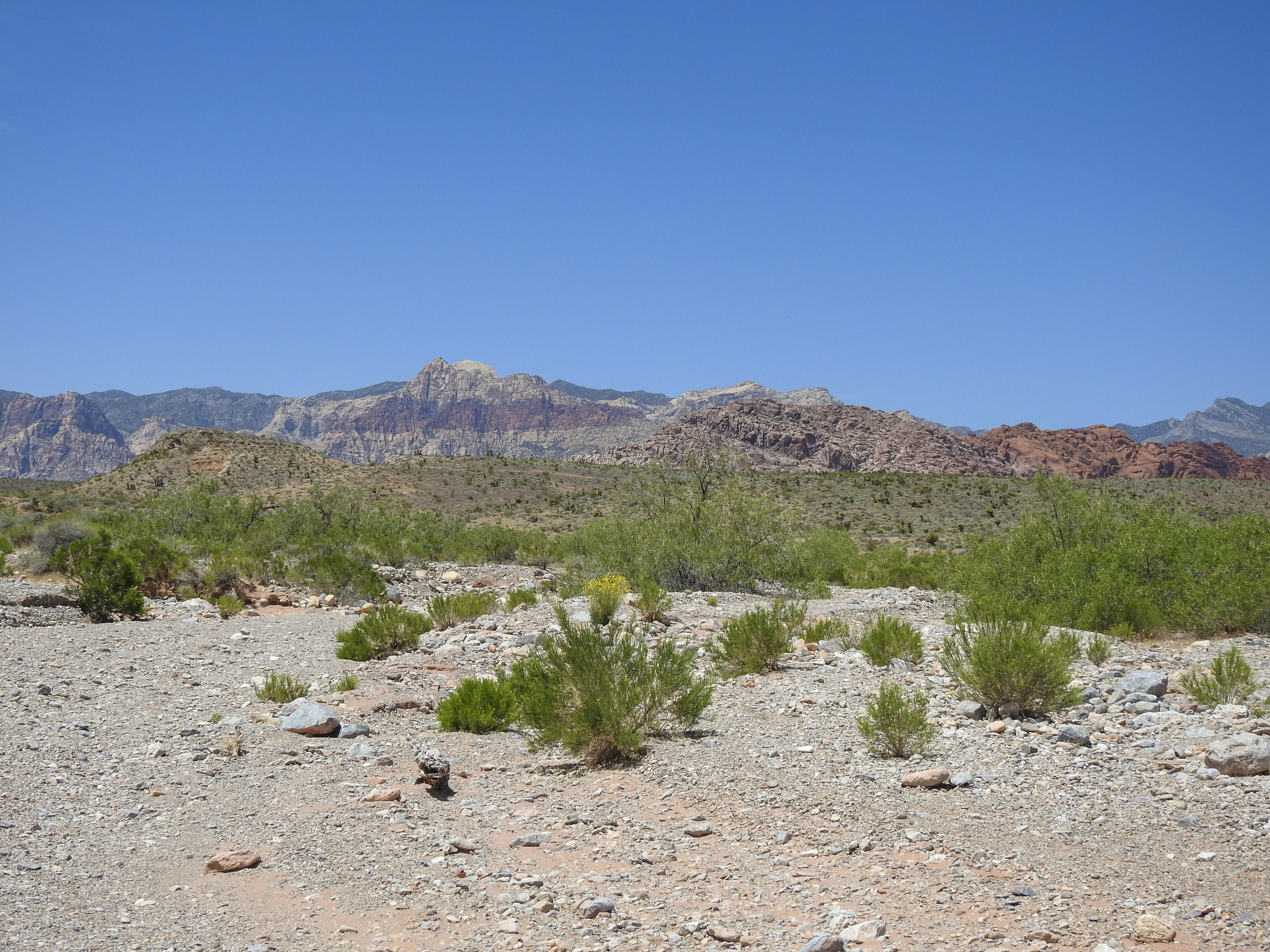
Dry desert wash shoulder

Red Rock Wash At Red Rock Canyon National Conservation Area

A Wide Dry Desert Wash at Red Rock Canyon NCA
