= Korean dogwood =

Korean dogwood is a common name for several dogwoods that occur in Korea, and may refer to:

- Cornus coreana, rarely cultivated as an ornamental plant
- Cornus kousa, a widely cultivated ornamental plant
