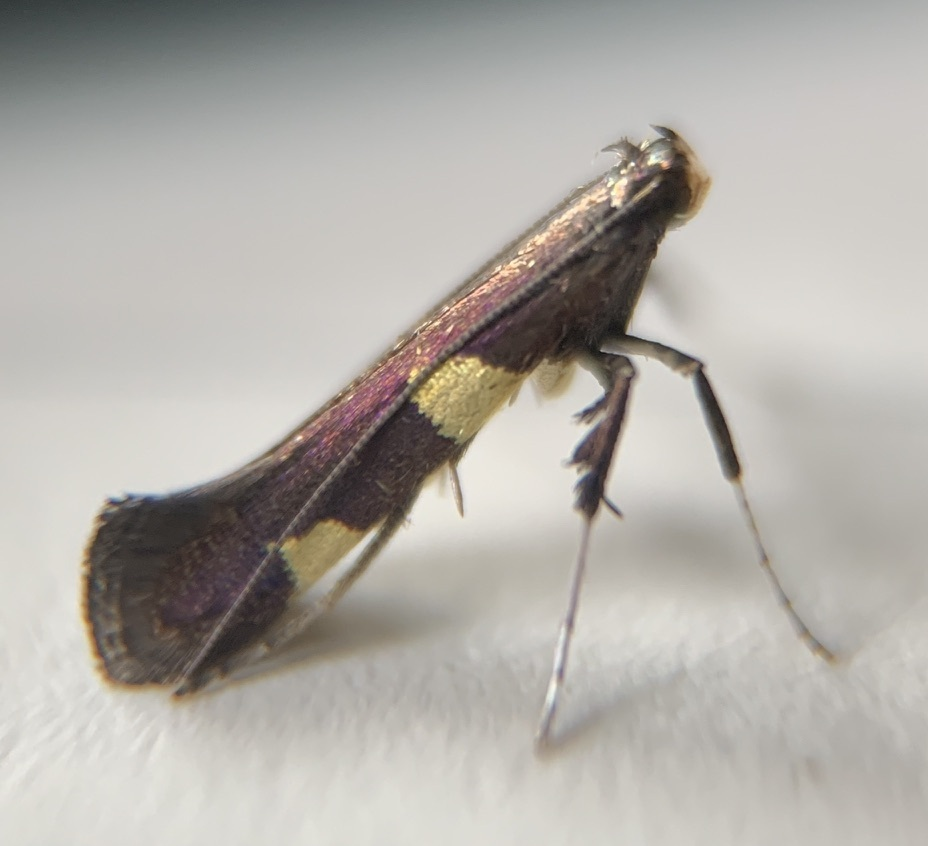

Scientific classification
- Kingdom: Animalia
- Phylum: Arthropoda
- Clade: Pancrustacea
- Class: Insecta
- Order: Lepidoptera
- Family: Gracillariidae
- Genus: Caloptilia
- Species: C. cornusella

Binomial name
- Caloptilia cornusella (Ely, 1915)

= Caloptilia cornusella =

Species of moth

Caloptilia cornusella is a moth of the family Gracillariidae. It is known from Canada (Ontario and Québec) and the United States (Kentucky, Maine, Michigan, Missouri, New York, Utah, Connecticut, Washington and Maryland).

The larvae feed on Cornus species, including Cornus alternifolia, Cornus canadensis, Cornus candidissima, Cornus circinata, Cornus rugosa, Cornus sericea and Cornus stolonifera. They mine the leaves of their host plant.
