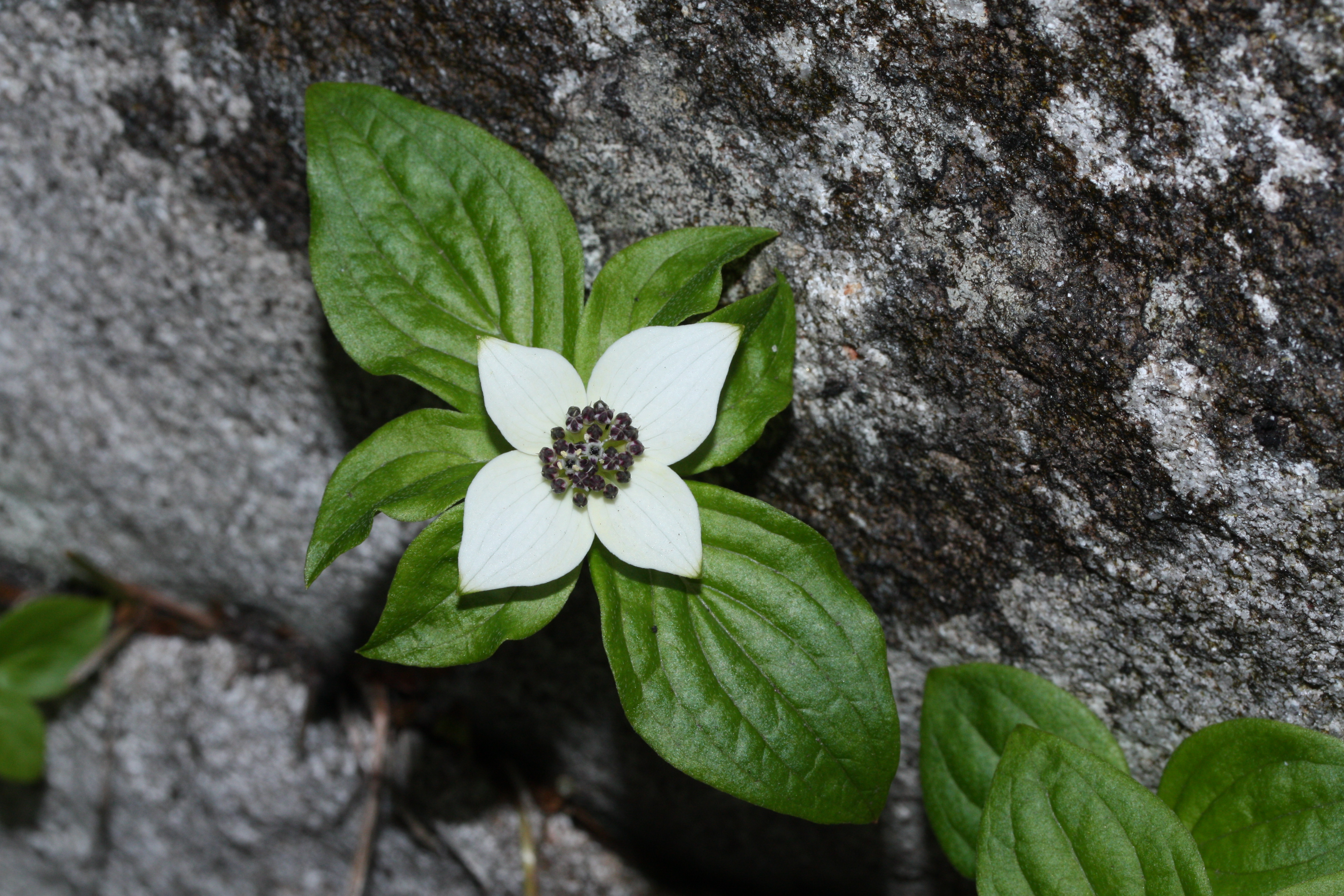

Scientific classification
- Kingdom: Plantae
- Clade: Embryophytes
- Clade: Tracheophytes
- Clade: Spermatophytes
- Clade: Angiosperms
- Clade: Eudicots
- Clade: Asterids
- Order: Cornales
- Family: Cornaceae
- Genus: Cornus
- Subgenus: Cornus subg. Arctocrania
- Species: C. × unalaschkensis

Binomial name
- Cornus × unalaschkensis Ledeb.

Synonyms
- Arctocrania × unalaschkensis (Ledeb.) Nakai; Chamaepericlymenum unalaschkense (Ledeb.) Rydb.; Cornella unalaschkensis (Ledeb.) Rydb.; Cornella × unalaschkensis (Ledeb.) Rydb.; Cornus × intermedia (Farr) Calder & R.L.Taylor; Cornus × lepagei Gervais & Blondeau

= Cornus × unalaschkensis =

Species of flowering plant

Cornus × unalaschkensis is a species of flowering plant in the Cornaceae, the dogwood family. Common names for the plant include Alaskan bunchberry, western cordilleran bunchberry, or simply western bunchberry.

The species is native to the west coast of North America from Alaska to California, as well as Magadan in Russia. In the northwestern United States it is a common plant, even abundant.

This is a rhizomatous subshrub with stems up to 20 centimetres (7.9 in) tall. Leaves are borne in a whorl and are oval in shape and up to 8 centimetres (3.1 in) long. The leaves are hairless to hairy. Flowers are borne in a cyme inflorescence, but are much smaller than the four white or pinkish bracts surrounding them. These bracts are 1 or 2 cm long; the petals at the center are only about a millimetre long. The fruit is a bright red drupe 6 to 8 mmm in length.

Its habitat includes forests and bogs, especially with layers of decaying matter.

The taxonomy of this plant is not entirely certain. This particular plant is not always considered a species in its own right. It is sometimes called a hybrid, or Cornus × unalaschkensis. Sometimes it is listed as the same species as Cornus canadensis. However, many authors consider it to be an allopolyploid, with chromosomes descended from C. canadensis and C. suecica. The three species can be told apart by careful examination of the petal and leaf morphology. Also, C. unalaschensis does not usually grow in the same regions as the other two plants.

The fruit of this plant is edible, and has been used for food by various Native American groups, such as the Bella Coola and Kitasoo. For example, the Haisla mixed the berries with oolichan grease and served the mash for dessert.
