= Cornus pubescens =

Cornus pubescens can refer to the following plant species:

- Cornus pubescens Willd., a synonym of Cornus excelsa Kunth
- Cornus pubescens Torr., a synonym of Cornus sericea L.
- Cornus pubescens Nutt., a synonym of Cornus torreyi S.Watson
