= Dwarf cornel =

Dwarf cornel may refer to the following plants:

- Canadian dwarf cornel, Cornus canadensis
- Eurasian dwarf cornel, Cornus suecica
