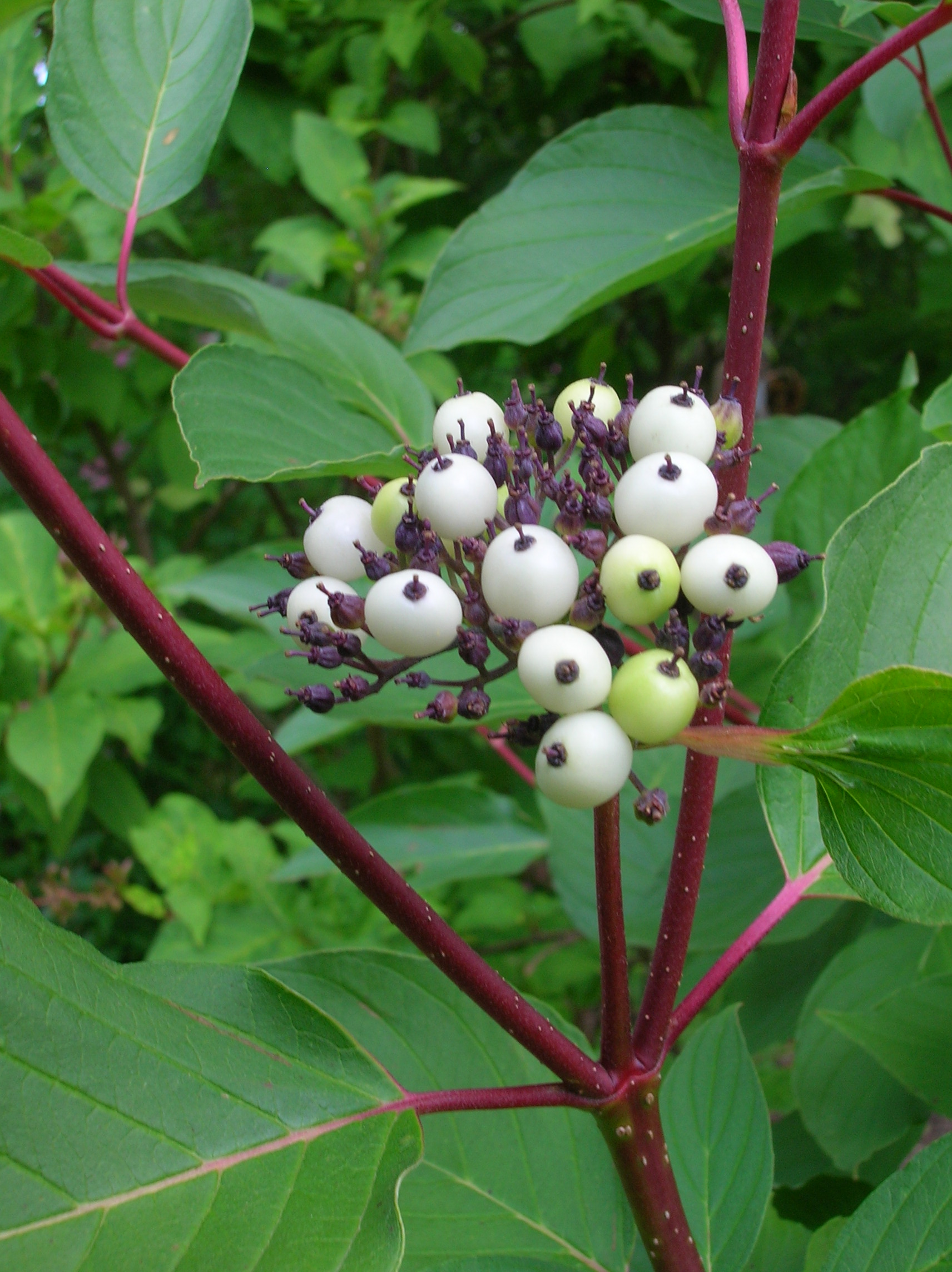

Scientific classification
- Kingdom: Plantae
- Clade: Tracheophytes
- Clade: Angiosperms
- Clade: Eudicots
- Clade: Asterids
- Order: Cornales
- Family: Cornaceae
- Genus: Cornus
- Subgenus: Cornus subg. Kraniopsis
- Species: C. hemsleyi

Binomial name
- Cornus hemsleyi C. K. Schneider & Wangerin 1909

= Cornus hemsleyi =

Species of flowering plant

Cornus hemsleyi is a species of dogwood found in Gansu, Guizhou, Hebei, Henan, Hubei, Qinghai, Shaanxi, Shanxi, Sichuan, Xizang, Yunnan provinces of China at elevations of 1000–4000 meters.
