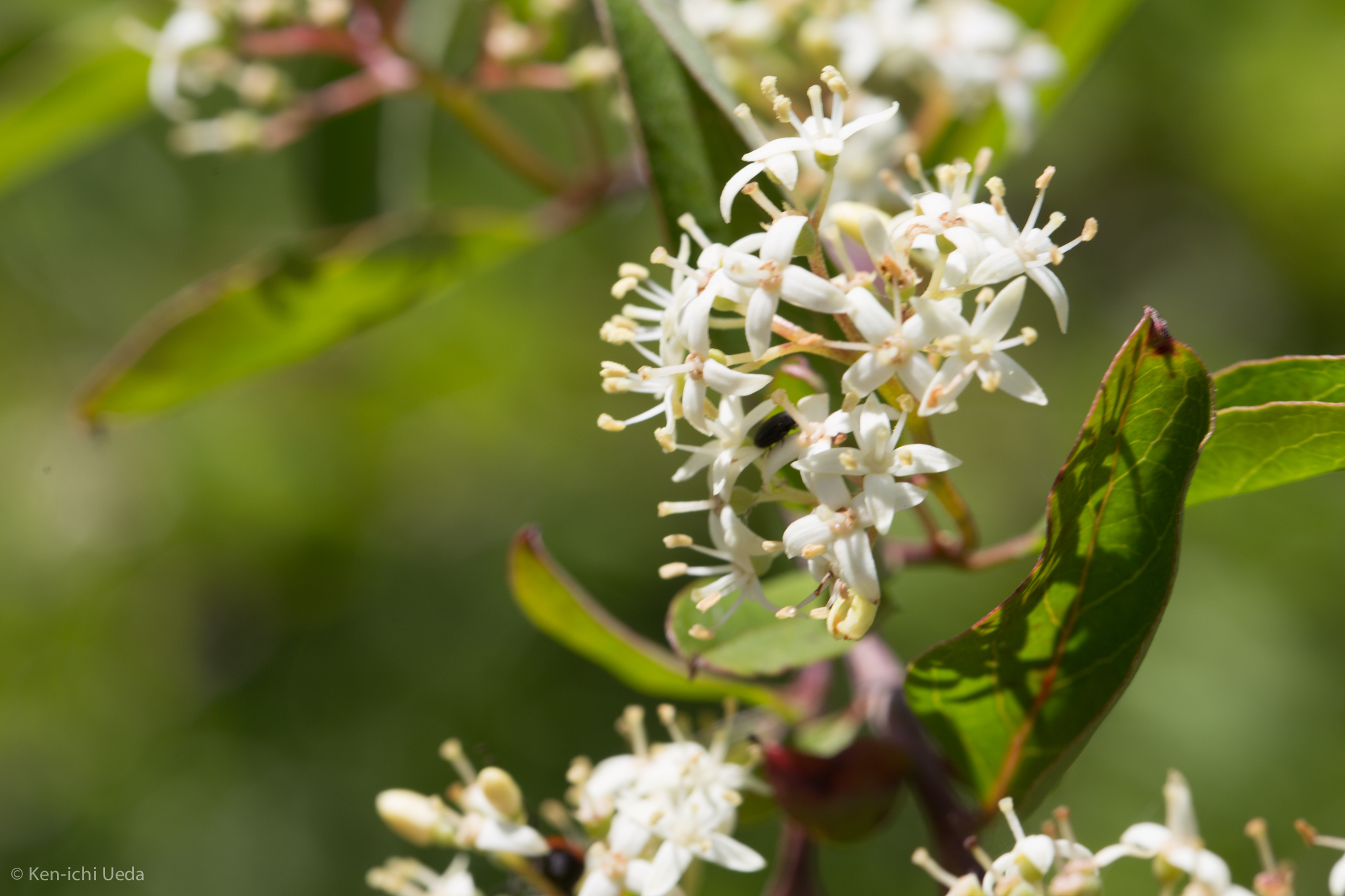

Scientific classification
- Kingdom: Plantae
- Clade: Tracheophytes
- Clade: Angiosperms
- Clade: Eudicots
- Clade: Asterids
- Order: Cornales
- Family: Cornaceae
- Genus: Cornus
- Subgenus: Cornus subg. Kraniopsis
- Species: C. glabrata

Binomial name
- Cornus glabrata Benth.
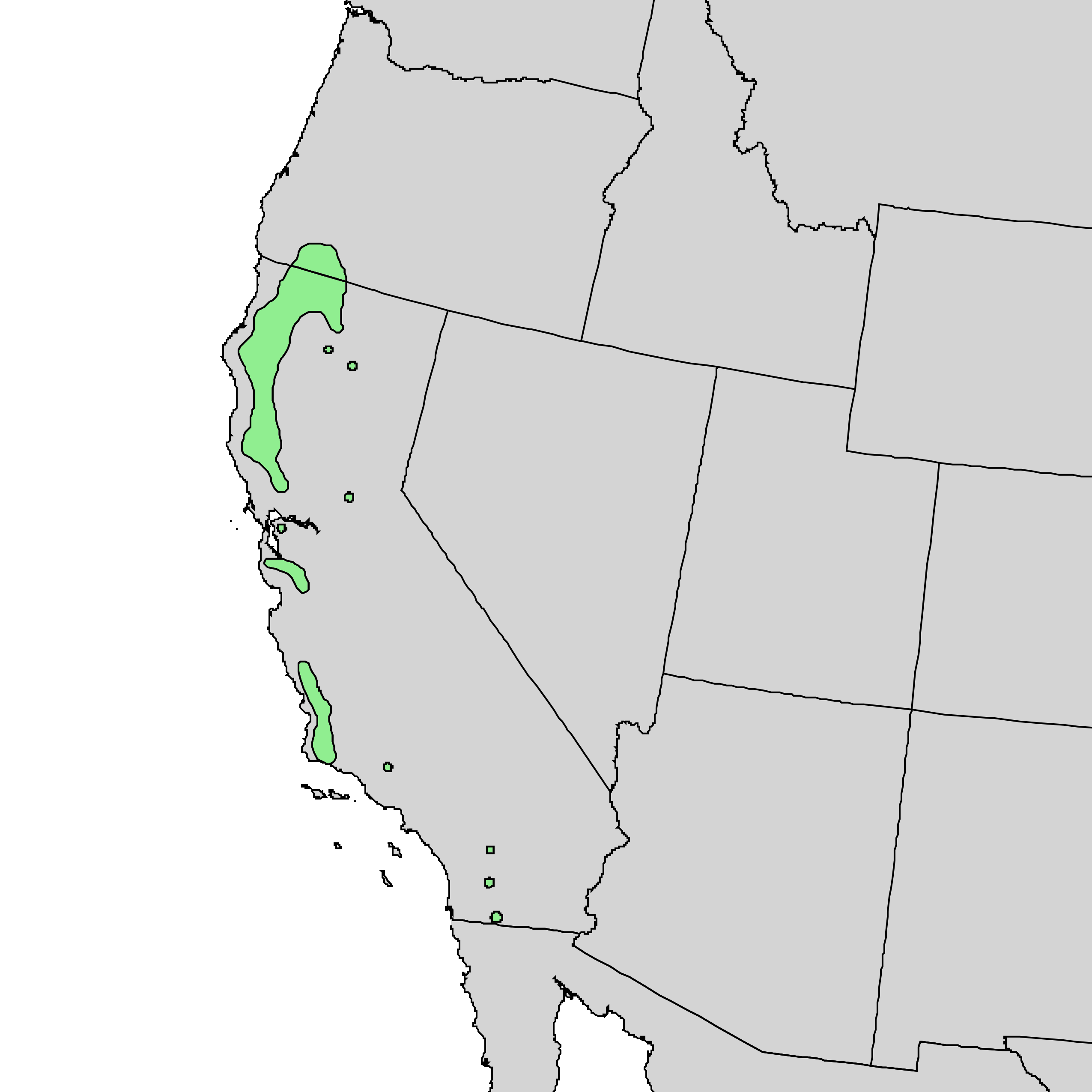
- Natural range of Cornus glabrata

= Cornus glabrata =

Brown dogwood

Species of flowering plant

Cornus glabrata is a species of dogwood native to California and Oregon and known by the common names brown dogwood, smooth dogwood, and western cornel. This is a large shrub or thicket-forming bush with bright green leaves which turn red in fall. It bears plentiful clusters of fuzzy white flowers and bluish-white berries. This shrub is most often found near water, usually directly on the bank of a water source.
