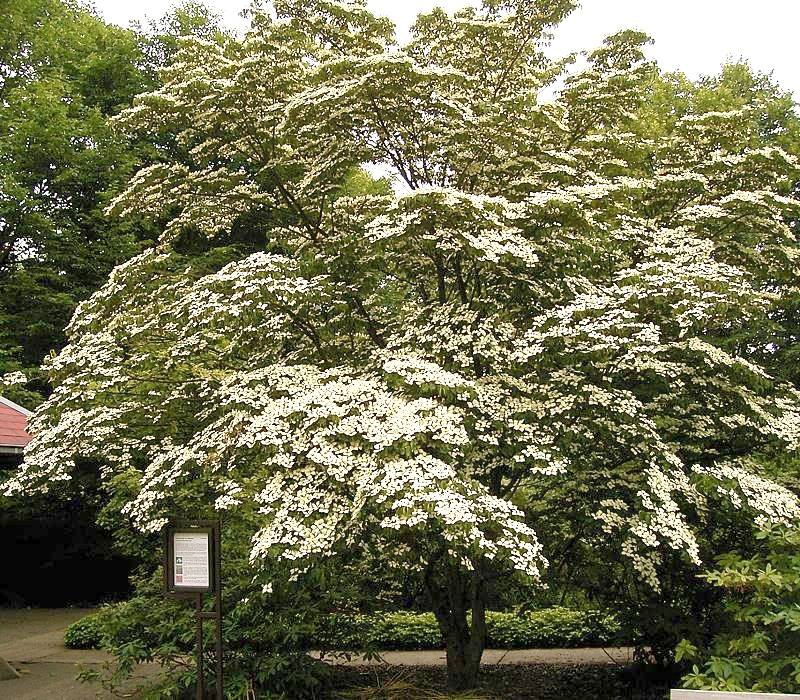
- Cornus kousa var. chinensis

Scientific classification
- Kingdom: Plantae
- Clade: Tracheophytes
- Clade: Angiosperms
- Clade: Eudicots
- Clade: Asterids
- Order: Cornales
- Family: Cornaceae
- Genus: Cornus; L.

Type species
- Cornus mas L.

Subgenera
- Afrocrania; Arctocrania; Cornus; Cynoxylon; Discocrania; Kraniopsis; Mesomora; Sinocornus; Syncarpea; Yinquania

Synonyms
- Chamaepericlimenum Hill

= Cornus =

Cornus Temporal range: Late Campanian–Holocene, 73–0 Ma

Genus of flowering plants in the dogwood family

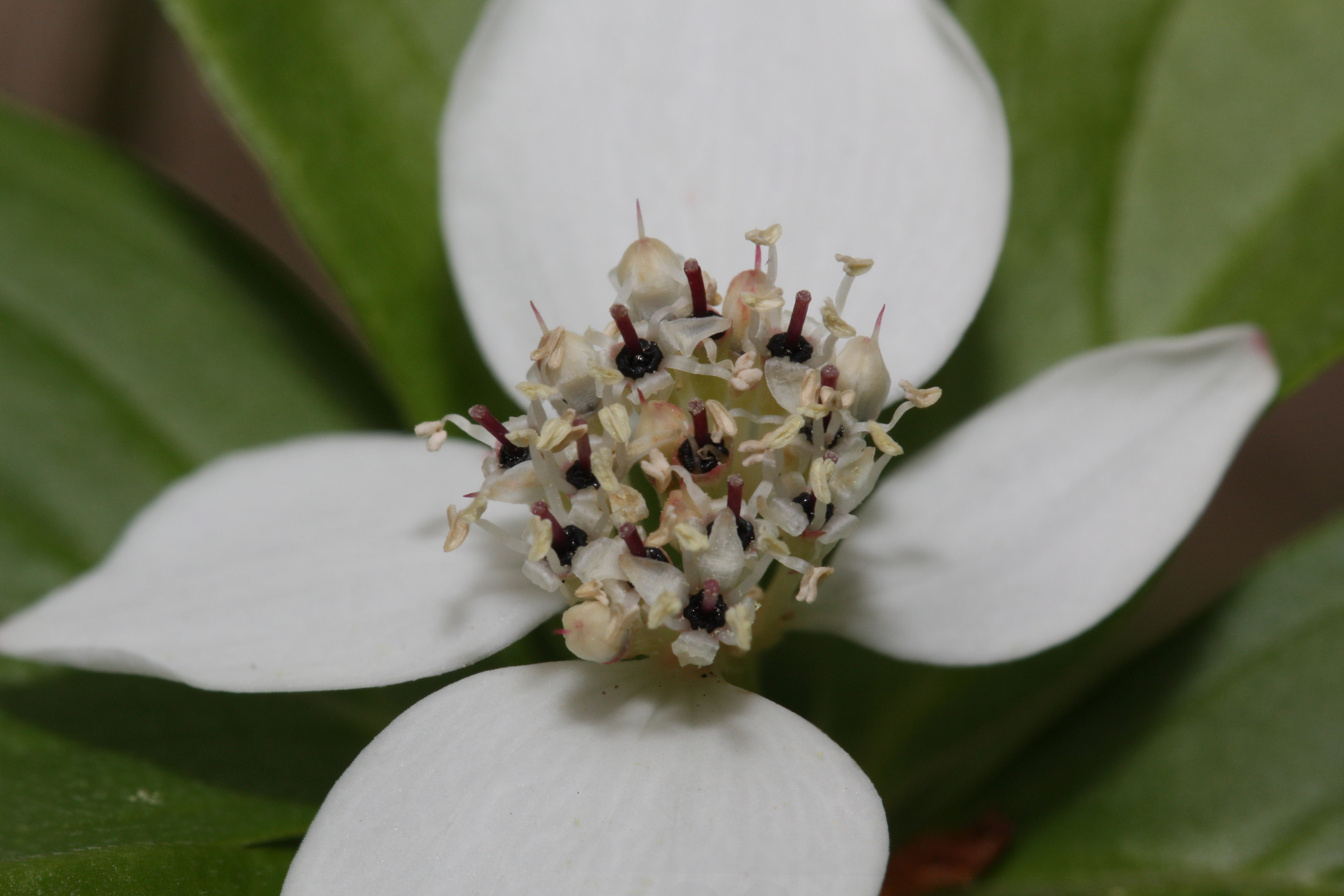
In species such as this Cornus × unalaschkensis, the tiny four-petaled flowers are clustered in a tightly packed, flattened cyme at the center of four showy white petal-like bracts.

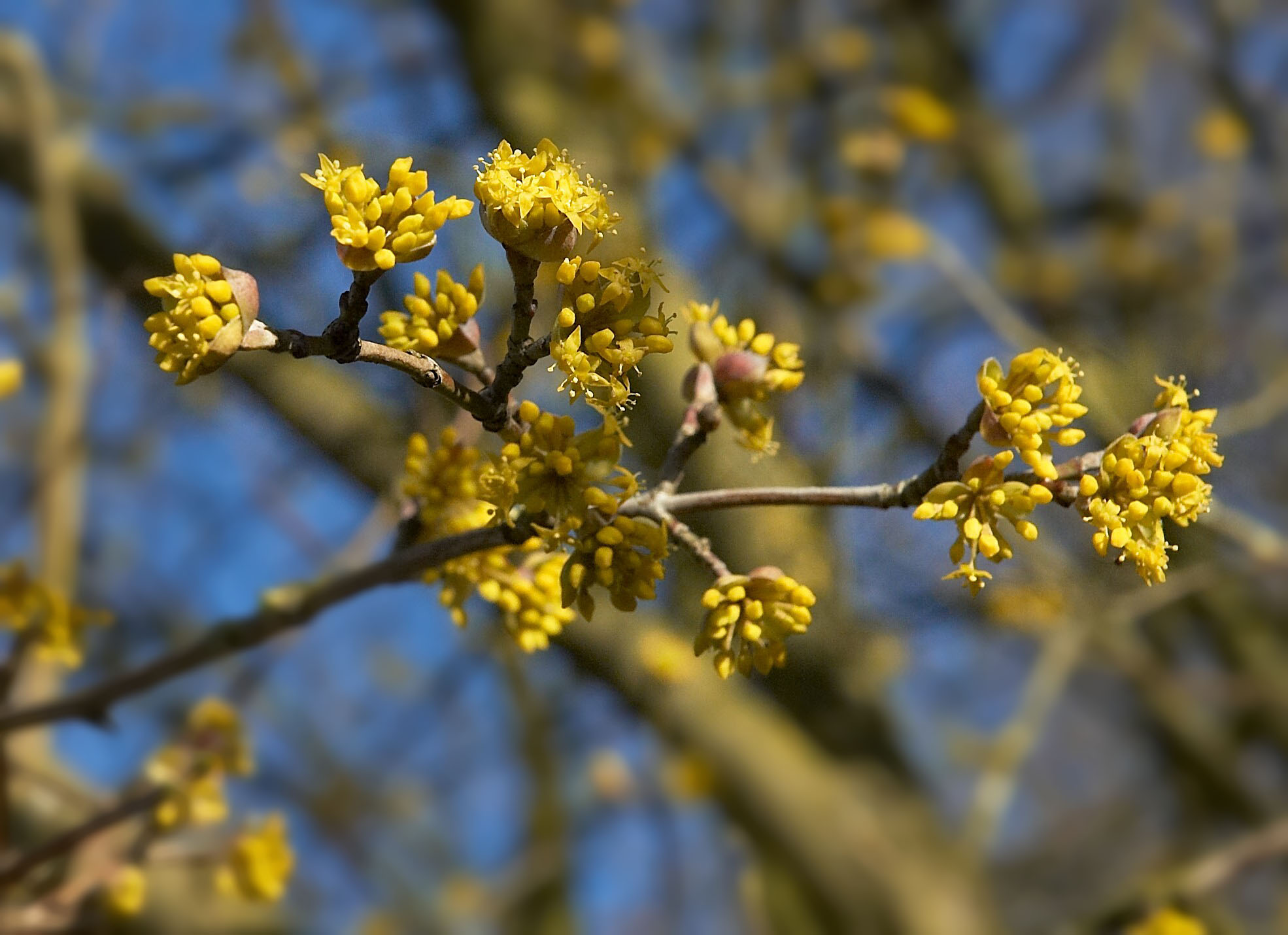
Cornus mas

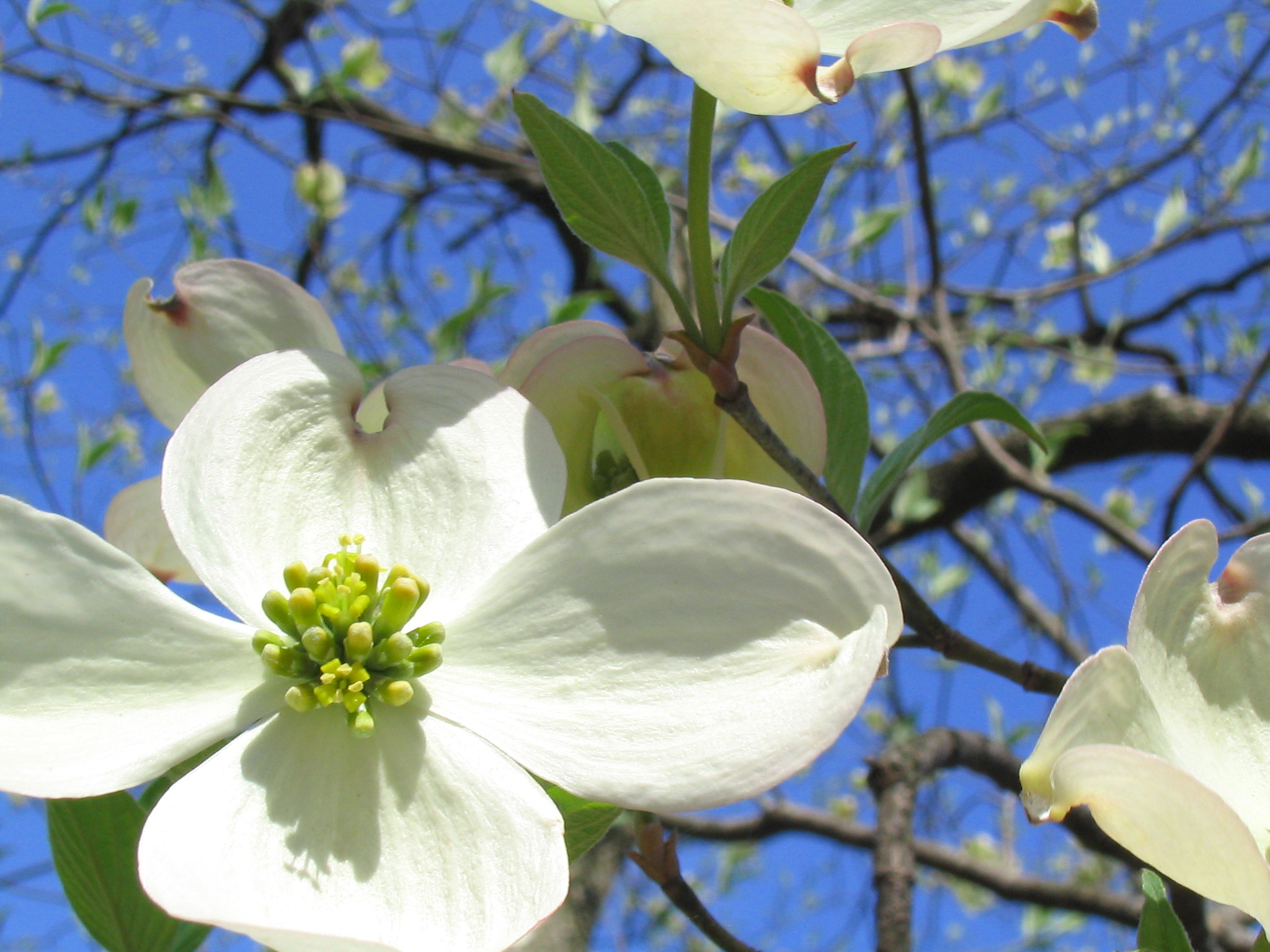
Cornus florida in spring

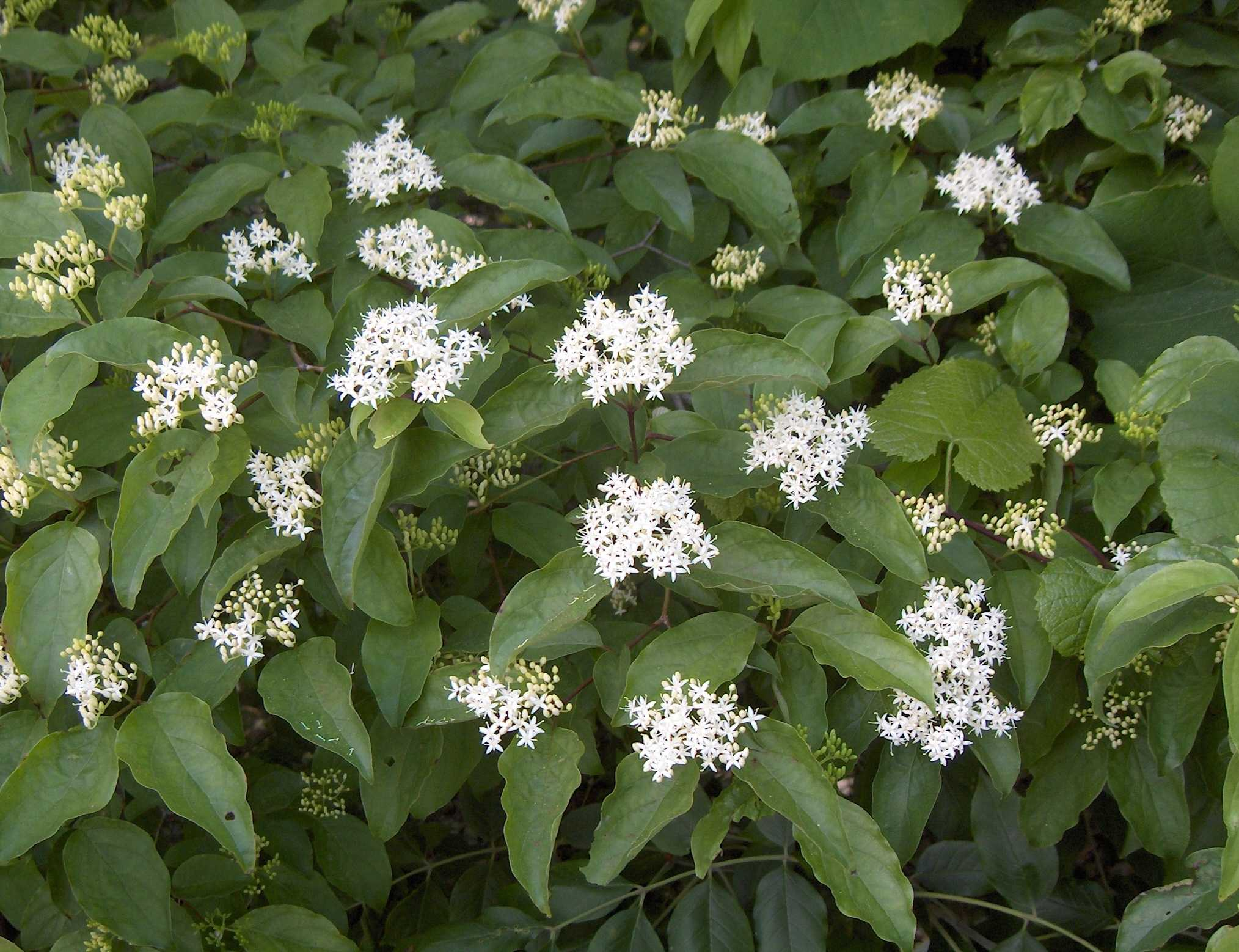
Cornus drummondii in flower

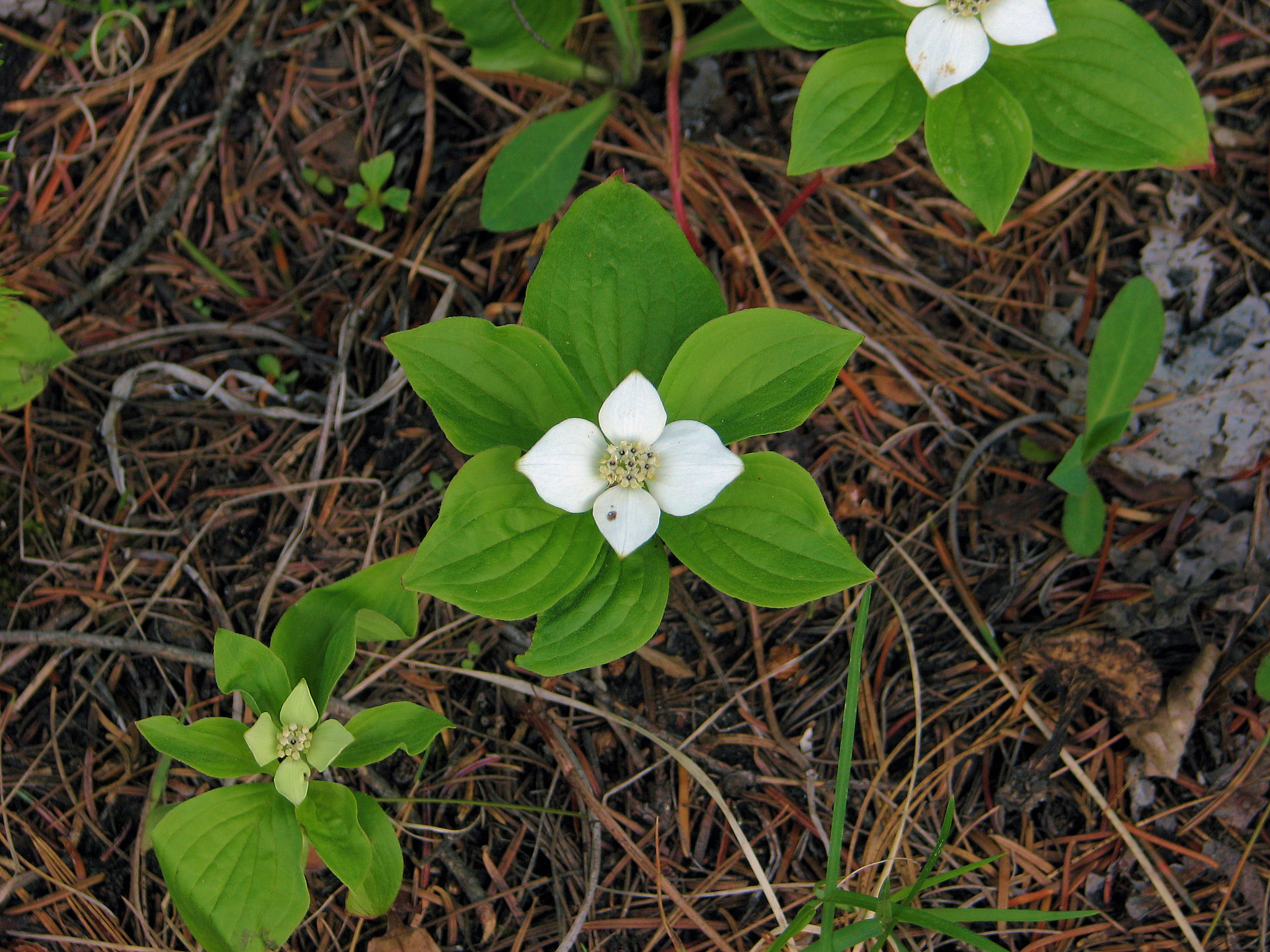
Mature and immature flowers of Cornus canadensis, Bonnechere Provincial Park, Ontario

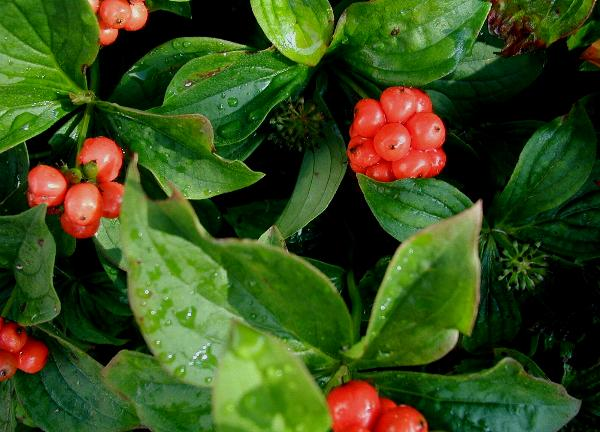
Cornus canadensis fruit

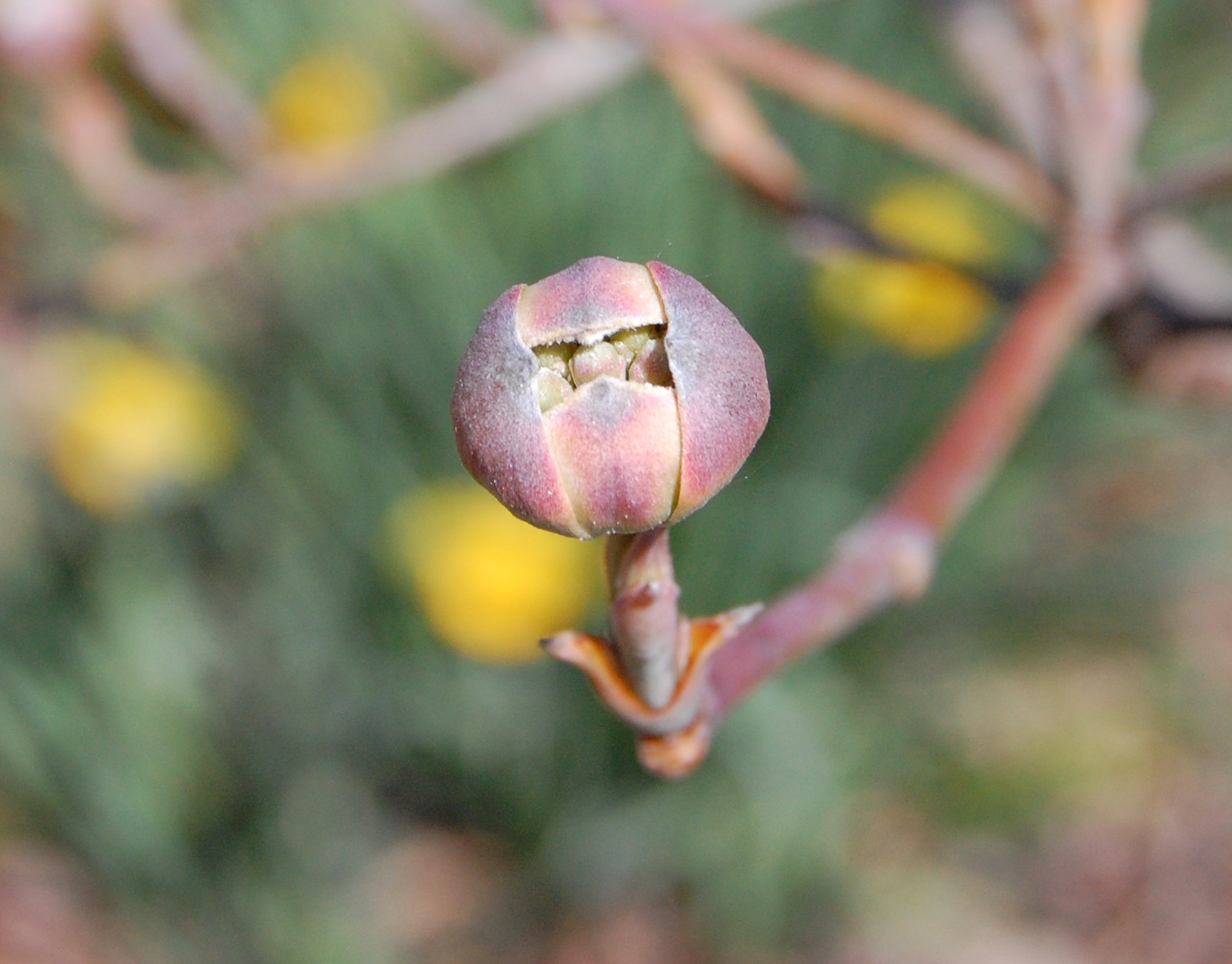
Spring budding

Cornus is a genus of about 30–60 species (Note: 58 species according to Xiang et al. (2006)) of woody plants in the family Cornaceae, commonly known as dogwoods or cornels, which can generally be distinguished by their blossoms, berries, and distinctive bark. Most are deciduous trees or shrubs, but a few species are nearly herbaceous perennial subshrubs, and some species are evergreen. Several species have small heads of inconspicuous flowers surrounded by an involucre of large, typically white petal-like bracts, while others have more open clusters of petal-bearing flowers. The various species of dogwood are native throughout much of temperate and boreal Eurasia and North America, with China, Japan, and the southeastern United States being particularly rich in native species. The genus is also known from South America with members such as Cornus peruviana.

Species include the common dogwood Cornus sanguinea of Eurasia, the widely cultivated flowering dogwood (Cornus florida) of eastern North America, the Pacific dogwood Cornus nuttallii of western North America, the Kousa dogwood Cornus kousa of eastern Asia, and two low-growing boreal species, the Canadian and Eurasian dwarf cornels (or bunchberries), Cornus canadensis and Cornus suecica respectively.

Depending on botanical interpretation, the dogwoods are variously divided into one to nine genera or subgenera; a broadly inclusive genus Cornus is accepted here.

== Terminology ==
Cornus is the Latin word for the cornel tree, Cornus mas. The name cornel dates to the 1550s, via German from Middle Latin cornolium, ultimately from the diminutive cornuculum, of cornum, the Latin word for the cornel cherry. Cornus means "horn", presumably applied to the cherry after the example of κερασός, the Greek word for "cherry", which itself is of pre-Greek origin but reminiscent of κέρας, the Greek word for "horn".

The name "dog-tree" entered the English vocabulary before 1548, becoming "dogwood" by 1614. Once the name dogwood was affixed to this kind of tree, it soon acquired a secondary name as the hound's tree, while the fruits came to be known as "dogberries" or "houndberries" (the latter a name also for the berries of black nightshade, alluding to Hecate's hounds).

The name was explained, from as early as the 16th century itself, as derived from dag "skewer", as the wood of the tree was said to have been used to make butcher's skewers. This is uncertain, as the form *dagwood was never attested. It is also possible that the tree was named for its berry, called dogberry from at least the 1550s, where the implication could be that the quality of the berry is inferior, as it were "fit for a dog".

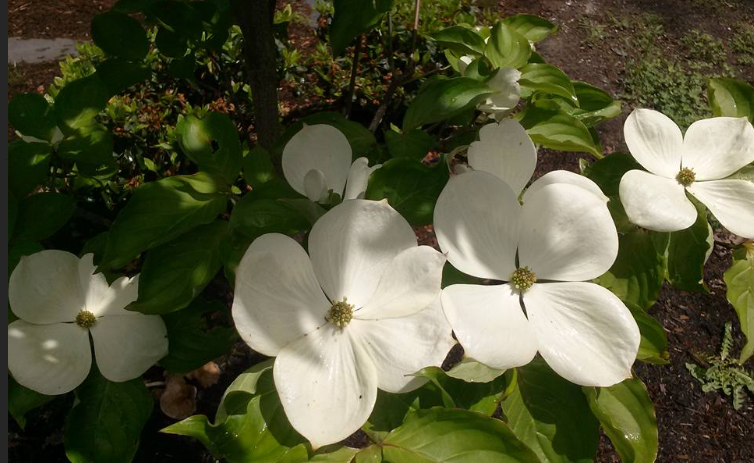
Cherokee princess dogwood

An older name of the dogwood in English is whipple-tree, occurring in a list of trees (as whipultre) in Geoffrey Chaucer Canterbury Tales. This name is cognate with the Middle Low German wipel-bom "cornel", Dutch wepe, weype "cornel" (the wh- in Chaucer is unetymological, the word would have been Middle English wipel). The tree was so named for waving its branches, cf. Middle Dutch wepelen "totter, waver", Frisian wepeln, German wippen.

The name whippletree, also whiffle-tree, now refers to an element of the traction of a horse-drawn cart linking the draw pole of the cart to the harnesses of the horses in file. In this sense it is first recorded in 1733. This mechanism was usually made from oak or ash (and not from dogwood), and it is unlikely that there is a connection to the name for whipple-tree for Cornus.

== Description ==
Dogwoods have simple, untoothed leaves with the veins curving distinctively as they approach the leaf margins. Most dogwood species have opposite leaves, while a few, such as Cornus alternifolia and C. controversa, have their leaves alternate. Dogwood flowers have four parts. In many species, the flowers are borne separately in open (but often dense) clusters, while in various other species (such as the flowering dogwood), the flowers themselves are tightly clustered, lacking showy petals, but surrounded by four to six large, typically white petal-like bracts.

The fruits of all dogwood species are drupes with one or two seeds, often brightly colorful. The drupes of species in the subgenus Cornus are edible. Many are without much flavor. Cornus kousa and Cornus mas are sold commercially as edible fruit trees. The fruits of Cornus kousa have a sweet, tropical pudding like flavor in addition to hard pits. The fruits of Cornus mas are both tart and sweet when completely ripe. They have been eaten in Eastern Europe for centuries, both as food and medicine to fight colds and flus. They are very high in vitamin C. By contrast, the fruits of species in subgenus Swida are mildly toxic to people, though readily eaten by birds.

Dogwoods are used as food plants by the larvae of some species of butterflies and moths, including the emperor moth, the engrailed, the small angle shades, and the following case-bearers of the genus Coleophora: C. ahenella, C. salicivorella (recorded on Cornus canadensis), C. albiantennaella, C. cornella and C. cornivorella, with the latter three all feeding exclusively on Cornus.

== Uses ==
Dogwoods are widely planted horticulturally, and the dense wood of the larger-stemmed species is valued for certain specialized purposes: cutting boards and fine turnings can be made from the fine-grained wood. Over 32 different varieties of game birds, including quail, feed on the dogwoods’ red seeds.

=== Horticulture ===
Various species of Cornus, particularly the flowering dogwood (Cornus florida), are ubiquitous in American gardens and landscaping; horticulturist Donald Wyman stated, "There is a dogwood for almost every part of the U.S. except the hottest and driest areas". In contrast, in Northwest Europe the lack of sharp winters and hot summers makes Cornus florida very shy of flowering.

Other Cornus species are stoloniferous shrubs that grow naturally in wet habitats and along waterways. Several of these are used along highways and in naturalizing landscape plantings, especially those species with bright red or bright yellow stems, particularly conspicuous in winter, such as Cornus stolonifera.

The following cultivars, of mixed or uncertain origin, have gained the Royal Horticultural Society's Award of Garden Merit (confirmed 2017):

- 'Eddie's White Wonder'
- 'Norman Hadden'
- 'Ormonde'
- 'Porlock'

=== Fruits ===
The species Cornus mas is commonly cultivated in southeastern Europe for its showy, edible berries, that have the color of the carnelian gemstone. Cornelian-cherries have one seed each and are used in syrups and preserves.

=== Wood ===
Dense and fine-grained, dogwood timber has a density of 0.79 and is highly prized for making loom shuttles, tool handles, roller skates and other small items that require a very hard and strong wood. Though it is tough for woodworking, some artisans favor dogwood for small projects such as walking canes, arrow making, mountain dulcimers and fine inlays. Dogwood wood is an excellent substitute for persimmon wood in the heads of certain golf clubs ("woods"). Dogwood lumber is rare in that it is not readily available with any manufacturer and must be cut down by the person(s) wanting to use it.

Larger items have also been occasionally made of dogwood, such as the screw-in basket-style wine or fruit presses. The first kinds of laminated tennis rackets were also made from this wood, cut into thin strips.

Dogwood twigs were used by U.S. pioneers to brush their teeth. They would peel off the bark, bite the twig and then scrub their teeth.

=== Traditional medicine ===
The bark of Cornus species is rich in tannins and has been used in traditional medicine as a substitute for quinine.

The Japanese cornel, C. officinalis, is used in traditional Chinese medicine as shān zhū yú for several minor ailments.

== Classification ==
The following classification recognizes a single, inclusive genus Cornus, with four subgroups and ten subgenera supported by molecular phylogeny. Geographical ranges as native plants are given below.

=== Blue- or white-fruited dogwoods ===
Paniculate or corymbose cymes; bracts minute, nonmodified; fruits globose or subglobose, white, blue, or black:

- Subgenus Yinquania. Leaves opposite to subopposite; fall blooming.
  - Cornus oblonga. East Asia from Pakistan through the Himalayas and China.
  - Cornus peruviana. Costa Rica and Venezuela to Bolivia.
- Subgenus Kraniopsis. Leaves opposite; summer blooming.
  - Cornus alba (Note: Cornus sericea, treated separately here, is sometimes included in a more broadly taken concept of Cornus alba, which in that sense is also native in North America.) (Siberian dogwood). Siberia and northern China.
  - Cornus amomum (Note: Cornus obliqua, here recognized separately, has been included in a broader concept of C. amomum by some botanists. Canadian reports for C. amomum are apparently all based on plants here classified as C. obliqua.) (silky dogwood). Eastern U.S. east of the Great Plains except for the Deep South.
  - Cornus asperifolia (toughleaf dogwood). Southeastern U.S.
  - Cornus austrosinensis (South China dogwood). East Asia.
  - Cornus bretschneideri (Bretschneider's dogwood). Northern China.
  - Cornus coreana (Korean dogwood). Northeast Asia.
  - Cornus drummondii (roughleaf dogwood). U.S. between the Appalachia and the Great Plains, and southern Ontario, Canada.
  - Cornus excelsa. Mexico to Honduras.
  - Cornus foemina (stiff dogwood) Southeastern and southern United States.
  - Cornus glabrata (brown dogwood or smooth dogwood). Western North America.
  - Cornus hemsleyi (Hemsley's dogwood). Southwest China.
  - Cornus koehneana (Koehne's dogwood). Southwest China.
  - Cornus macrophylla (large-leafed dogwood; Chinese: 棶木; pinyin: láimù). East Asia.
  - Cornus obliqua (Note: Cornus obliqua is sometimes included in a more broadly taken concept of C. amomum, also in the eastern U.S.) (pale dogwood). Northeastern and central U.S., and southeastern Canada.
  - Cornus paucinervis. China.
  - Cornus racemosa (northern swamp dogwood or gray dogwood). Northeastern and central U.S., and extreme southeastern Canada.
  - Cornus rugosa (round-leaf dogwood). Northeastern and north-central U.S., and southeastern Canada.
  - Cornus sanguinea (common dogwood). Europe.
  - Cornus sericea (Note: Cornus sericea (including C. stolonifera) is sometimes itself included in a more broadly taken concept of the otherwise Eurasian Cornus alba.) (red osier dogwood). Northern and western North America, except Arctic regions.
  - Cornus torreyi, western North America
  - Cornus walteri (Walter's dogwood). Central China.
  - Cornus wilsoniana (ghost dogwood). China.
  - Cornus × arnoldiana (Hybrid: C. obliqua × C. racemosa). Eastern North America.
- Subgenus Mesomora. Leaves alternate; summer blooming.
  - Cornus alternifolia (pagoda dogwood or alternate-leaf dogwood). Eastern U.S. and southeastern Canada.
  - Cornus controversa (table dogwood). East Asia.

=== Cornelian cherries ===
Umbellate cymes; bracts modified, non-petaloid; fruits oblong, red; stone walls filled with cavities:

- Subgenus Afrocrania. Dioecious, bracts 4.
  - Cornus volkensii. Afromontane eastern Africa.
- Subgenus Cornus. Plants hermaphroditic, bracts 4 or 6
  - Cornus eydeana. Yunnan in China
  - Cornus mas (European cornel or Cornelian-cherry). Mediterranean.
  - Cornus officinalis (Japanese cornel). China, Japan, Korea.
  - †Cornus piggae (Late Paleocene, North Dakota)
  - Cornus sessilis (blackfruit cornel). California.
- Subgenus Sinocornus. Plants hermaphroditic, bracts 4 or 6
  - Cornus chinensis (Chinese cornel). China.

=== Big-bracted dogwoods ===
Capitular cymes:

- Subgenus Discocrania. Bracts 4, modified, non-petaloid; fruits oblong, red.
  - Cornus disciflora. Mexico and Central America
- Subgenus Cynoxylon. Bracts 4 or 6, large and petaloid, fruits oblong, red.
  - Cornus florida (flowering dogwood). U.S. east of the Great Plains, north to southern Ontario.
  - Cornus nuttallii (Pacific dogwood). Western North America, from British Columbia to California.
- Subgenus Syncarpea. Bracts 4, large and petaloid, fruits red, fused into a compound multi-stoned berry.
  - Cornus capitata (Himalayan flowering dogwood). Himalaya.
  - Cornus hongkongensis (Hong Kong dogwood). Southern China, Laos, Vietnam.
  - Cornus kousa (Kousa dogwood). Japan and (as subsp. chinensis) central and northern China.
  - Cornus multinervosa. Yunnan and Sichuan provinces of China

=== Dwarf dogwoods ===
Minute corymbose cymes; bracts 4, petaloid; fruit globose, red; rhizomatous herb:

- Subgenus Arctocrania.
  - Cornus canadensis (Canadian dwarf cornel or bunchberry) Northern North America, southward in the Appalachian and Rocky Mountains.
  - Cornus suecica (Eurasian dwarf cornel or bunchberry). Northern Eurasia, locally in extreme northeast and northwest North America.
  - Cornus × unalaschkensis (Hybrid: C. canadensis × C. suecica). Aleutian Islands (Alaska), Greenland, and Labrador and Newfoundland in Canada.
  - Cornus wardiana (Evergreen dwarf cornel or bunchberry). Northern Myanmar.

=== Incertae sedis (unplaced) ===
- †Cornus clarnensis (Middle Eocene, Central Oregon)

=== Horticultural hybrids ===
Cornus × rutgersensis (Hybrid: C. florida × C. kousa). Horticulturally developed.

== Cultural references ==
The inflorescence of the Pacific dogwood (Cornus nuttallii) is the official flower of the province of British Columbia. The flowering dogwood (Cornus florida) and its inflorescence are the state tree and the state flower respectively for the U.S. Commonwealth of Virginia. It is also the state tree of Missouri and the state flower of North Carolina, and the state memorial tree of New Jersey. The term "dogwood winter", in colloquial use in the American Southeast, especially Appalachia, is sometimes used to describe a cold snap in spring, presumably because farmers believed it was not safe to plant their crops until after the dogwoods blossomed.
