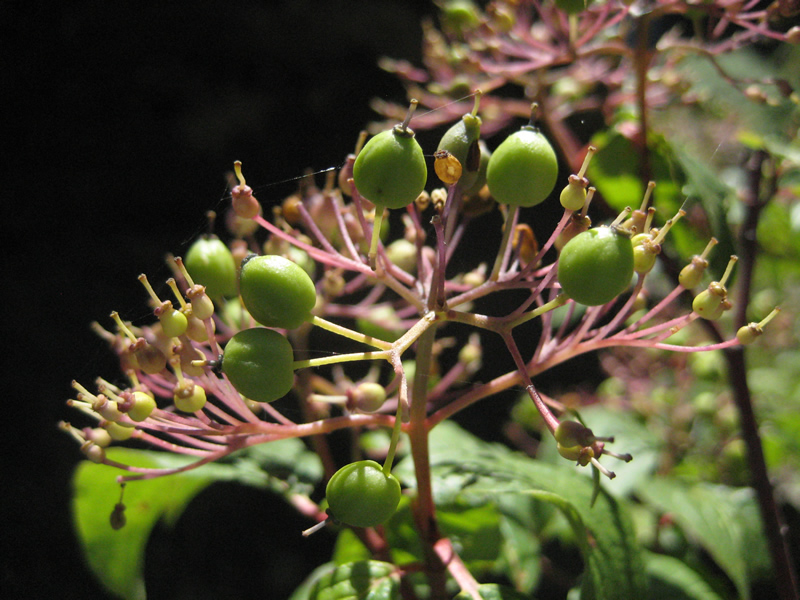

Scientific classification
- Kingdom: Plantae
- Clade: Tracheophytes
- Clade: Angiosperms
- Clade: Eudicots
- Clade: Asterids
- Order: Cornales
- Family: Cornaceae
- Genus: Cornus
- Subgenus: Cornus subg. Cornus
- Species: C. sessilis

Binomial name
- Cornus sessilis Torr. ex Durand (1855)
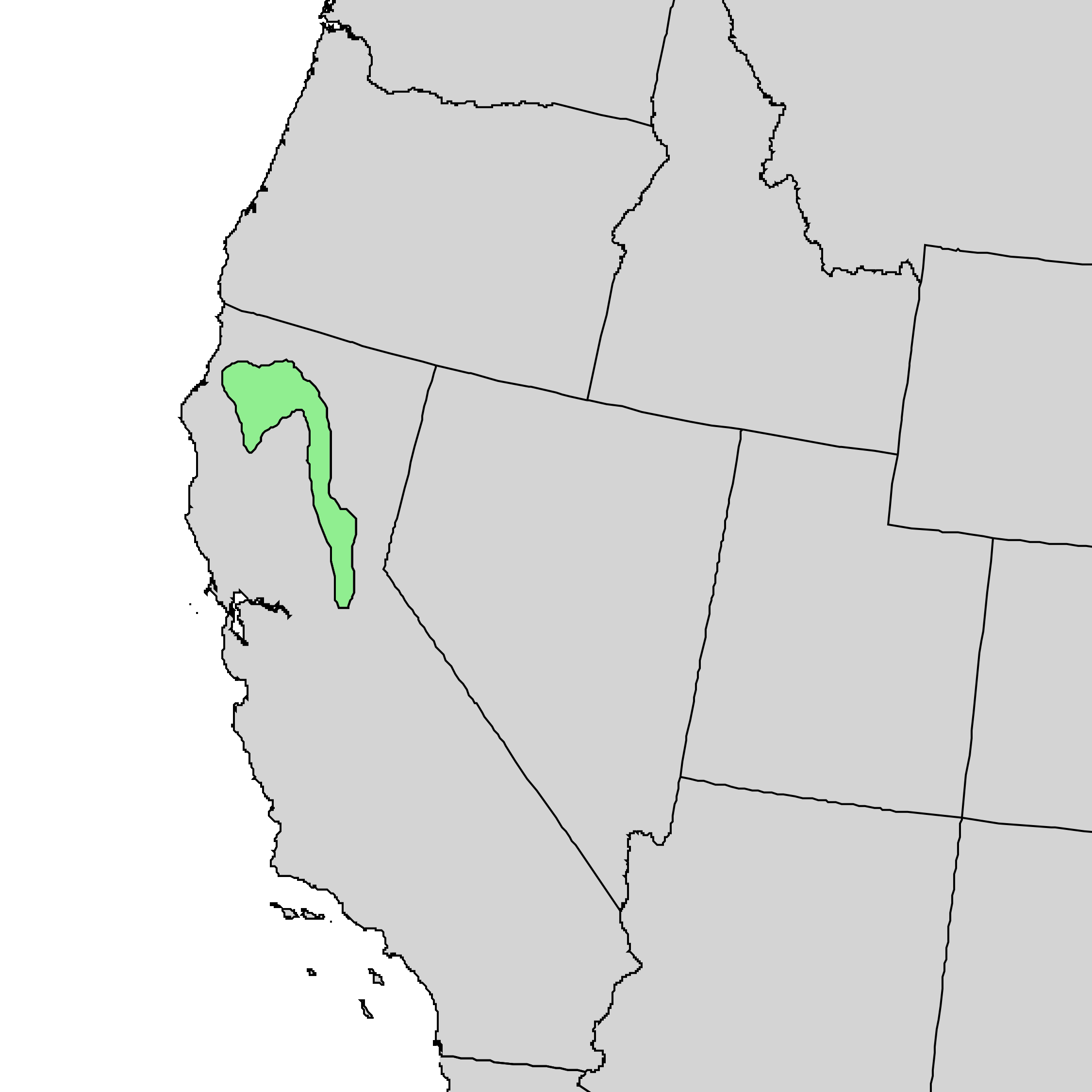
- Natural range of Cornus sessilis

= Cornus sessilis =

Species of flowering plant

Cornus sessilis is a species of dogwood known by the common names blackfruit cornel, blackfruit dogwood, and miner's dogwood.

== Description ==
This dogwood is a shrub or small tree approaching 5 metres (16 ft) in height at maximum. It is deciduous, bearing deeply veined oval green leaves in season which turn red before falling.

The inflorescence is a cluster of tiny greenish-yellow flowers surrounded by thick, pointed bracts. The fruit is a round drupe about a centimeter wide which is white when new and gradually turns shiny black. The fruit attracts many birds.

== Distribution and habitat ==
The species is endemic to northern California, where it grows along streambanks in the Cascades, Sierra Nevada, and the coastal mountain ranges. It is a tree of the redwood understory in its native range.
