= Coleophora cornella =

Scientific classification
- Kingdom: Animalia
- Phylum: Arthropoda
- Class: Insecta
- Order: Lepidoptera
- Family: Coleophoridae
- Genus: Coleophora
- Species: C. cornella

Binomial name
- Coleophora cornella Walsingham, 1882

Synonyms
- Coleophora albiantennaella Wild, 1915

Species of moth

Coleophora cornella is a moth of the family Coleophoridae. It is found in the United States, including New York and California.

The larvae feed on the leaves of Cornus pubescens species. They create a spatulate leaf case.
