= Cornus peruviana =

Conservation status
- Least Concern (IUCN 3.1)

Scientific classification
- Kingdom: Plantae
- Clade: Tracheophytes
- Clade: Angiosperms
- Clade: Eudicots
- Clade: Asterids
- Order: Cornales
- Family: Cornaceae
- Genus: Cornus
- Subgenus: Cornus subg. Yinquania
- Species: C. peruviana

Binomial name
- Cornus peruviana J.F.Macbr.

Synonyms
- Cornus boliviana J.F.Macbr.; Swida boliviana (J.F.Macbr.) Soják; Swida peruviana (J.F. Macbr.) Holub; Thelycrania boliviana (J.F.Macbr.) Pojark.; Viburnum peruvianum (J.F. Macbr.) J.F. Macbr.

Species of tree

Cornus peruviana is a species of tree in the family Cornaceae native to montane forests of southern Central America and western South America, from Costa Rica and Venezuela south to Bolivia.

== Description ==
Cornus peruviana is a small to a large tree up to 20 meters tall, and flowering at 3 meters high. Trees flower and fruit year round.

== Range and habitat ==
Cornus peruviana is native to the Cordillera de Talamanca of Costa Rica (Puntarenas and San Jose provinces), and the northern Andes of Colombia (Antioquia, Cundinamarca, and Nariño departments), Venezuela (Táchira state), Ecuador (Pichincha Province), Peru (Amazonas, Apurímac, and San Martín departments), and Bolivia (Ayopaya Province).

Its typical habitats are forested slopes and stream banks in montane forests between 1,800 and 3,400 meters elevation.
