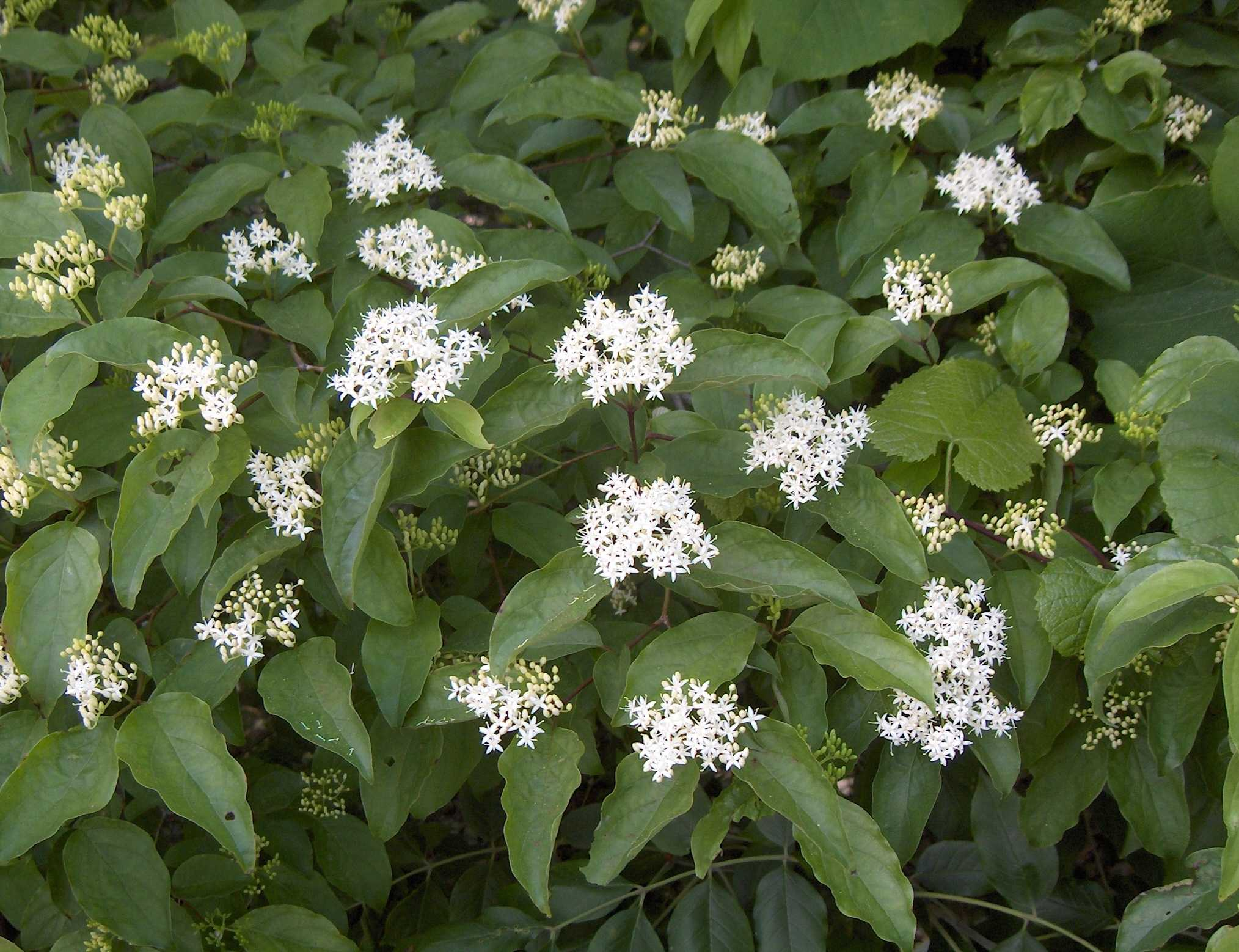
- Flowers

Conservation status
- Least Concern (IUCN 3.1)

Scientific classification
- Kingdom: Plantae
- Clade: Embryophytes
- Clade: Tracheophytes
- Clade: Spermatophytes
- Clade: Angiosperms
- Clade: Eudicots
- Clade: Asterids
- Order: Cornales
- Family: Cornaceae
- Genus: Cornus
- Subgenus: Cornus subg. Kraniopsis
- Species: C. drummondii

Binomial name
- Cornus drummondii C.A.Mey.
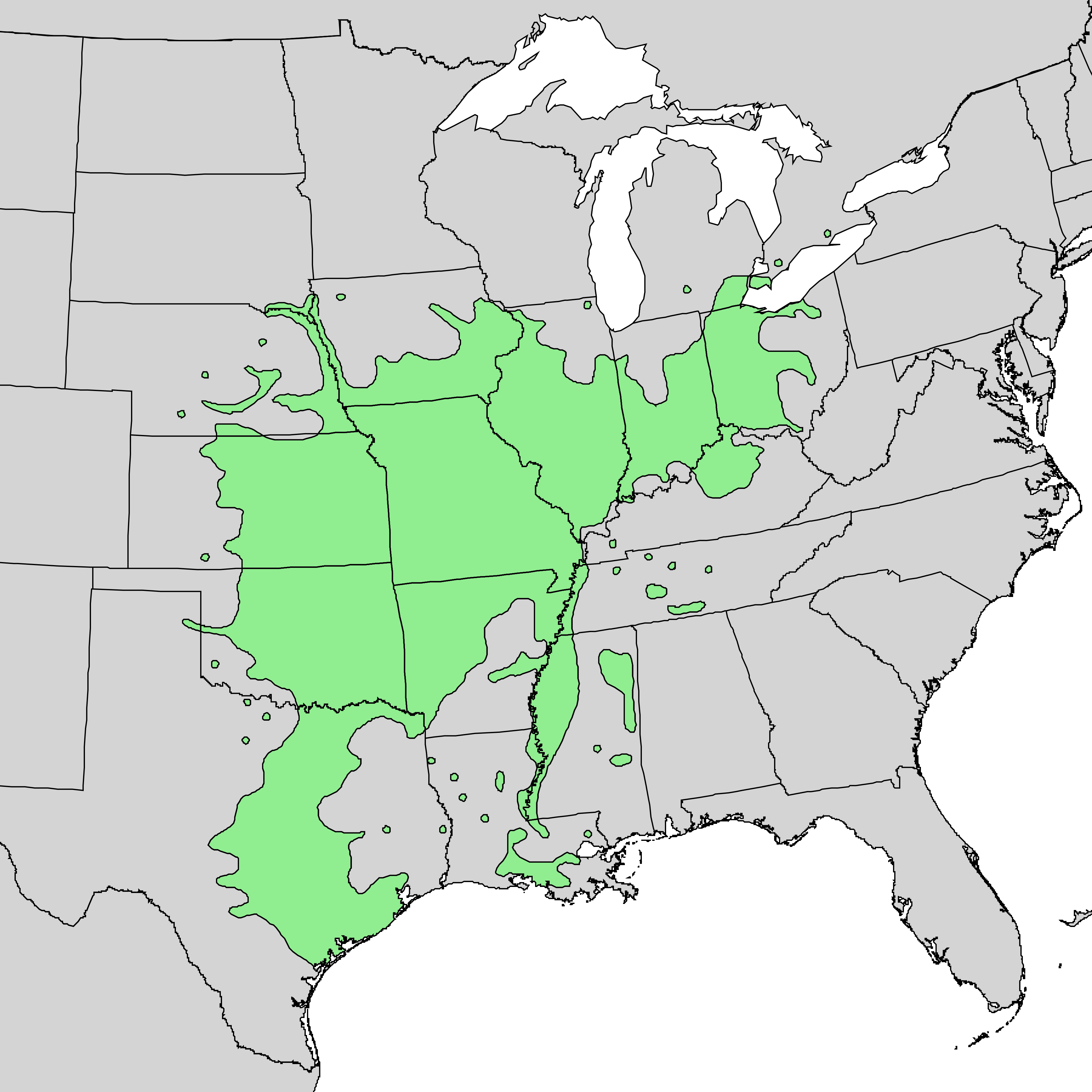
- Natural range of Cornus drummondii

= Cornus drummondii =

Species of tree

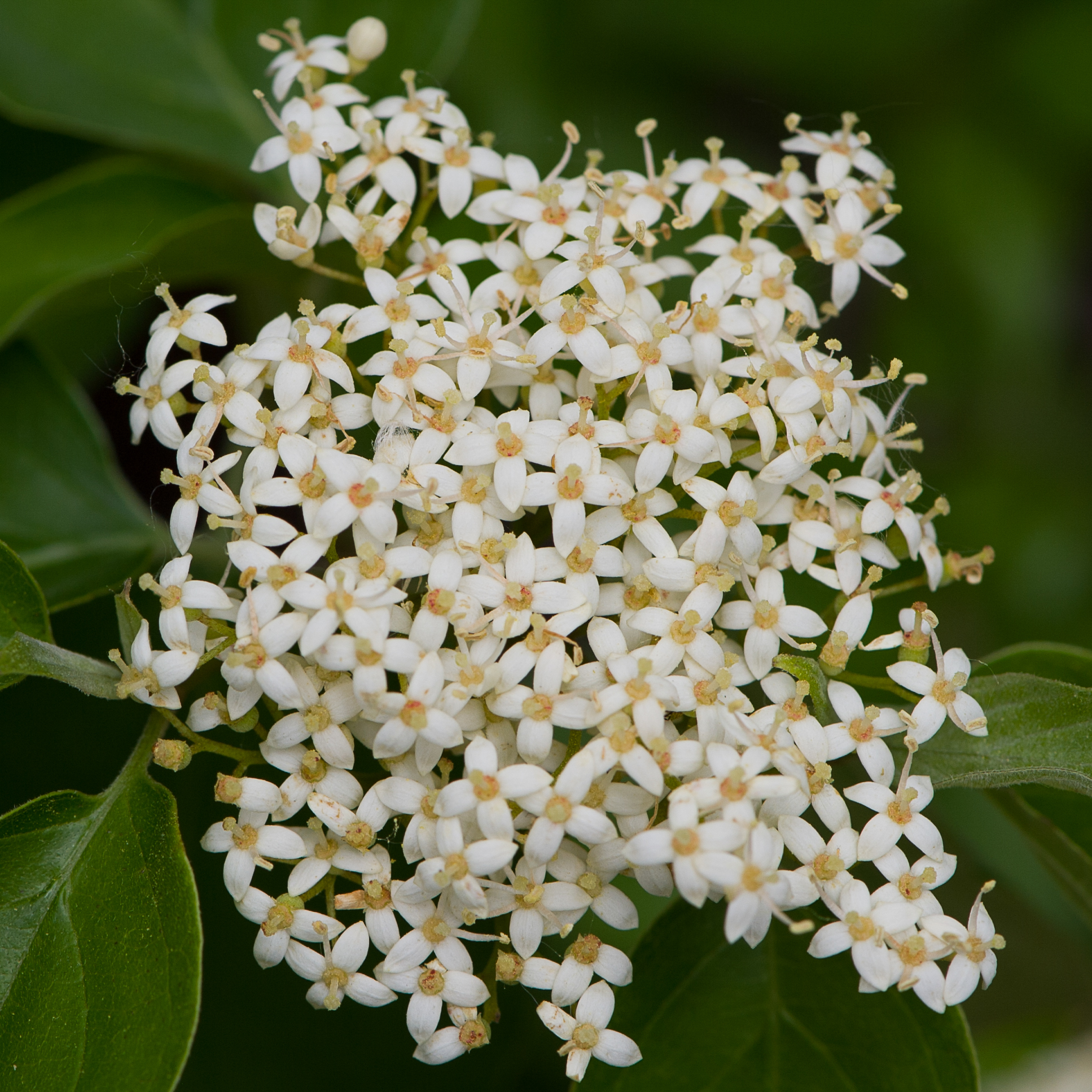
Flower cluster detail

Cornus drummondii, commonly known as the roughleaf dogwood, is a small deciduous tree that is native primarily to the Great Plains and Midwestern regions of the United States. It is also found around the Mississippi River. It is uncommon in the wild, and is mostly found around forest borders. The roughleaf dogwood is used as a buffer strip around parking lots, in the median of highways and near the decks and patios of homes. It can grow to a height of 15 to 25 feet (4.6 to 7.6 m) with a spread of 10 to 15 feet (3.0 to 4.6 m). The roughleaf dogwood flowers during the summer months. It produces near-white four-petaled flowers that are followed by small white fruits, which ripen from August to October. These dogwoods can form a dense thicket that is used as cover for wildlife. Over forty species of birds are known to feed on the fruits.

== Description ==
Cornus drummondii is a deciduous tree in the Cornaceae family. Cornus drummondii produces fruit that ripens from August to October. It is uncommon in the wild, and is mostly found around forest borders. The roughleaf dogwood flowers during the summer months. Leaf description: petiole 8–25 mm; blade lanceolate to ovate, 2–12 × 1.2–7.7 cm, base cuneate, truncate, or cordate, apex abruptly acuminate, abaxial surface pale green, hairs curved upward, dense, adaxial surface gray-green, hairs curved upward or appressed; secondary veins 3–4(–5) per side, most arising from proximal 1/2. The leaf is ovate shaped and has a pinnate venation. The leaves are an olive green color. The flowers bloom white and bloom in the months April to July.

Cornus drummondii has low water requirements and grows in shaded or partially shaded areas. Will grow in dry or moist alkaline soil. Cornus drummondii can be grown in sandy, sandy loam, medium loam, clay loam, and clay soils. Unlike many other dogwoods, roughleaf dogwood is very adaptable and can grow in a multitude of conditions.

The native habitats for Cornus drummondii are wetlands, mesic and dry-mesic woodlands, riparian forests and on limestone topography. It commonly forms thickets.

== Taxonomy ==
The species name drummondii is named for Scottish naturalist Thomas Drummond by Carl Anton Von Mey in 1845. Drummond's collection of 750 plant species has been shared throughout museums and scientific institutions throughout the world. The genus name Cornus comes from the Latin word for horn, "Cornu" which is likely in reference to the tree's dense wood.

== Horticultural use ==
Cornus drummondii should be grown in full sunlight and well drained soil. The roughleaf dogwood does not require much water to grow. The roughleaf dogwood is used as a buffer planting around parking lots, in the medians of highways and near the decks and patios of homes. The roughleaf dogwood is used as an ornamental tree because of its ability to survive with little care once mature because of its tolerance to pests, low water requirements and tolerance to shade. It can grow to a height of 15 to 25 feet (4.6 to 7.6 m) with a spread of 10 to 15 feet (3.0 to 4.6 m). Cornus drummondii is often planted to attract birds as birds tend to favor the roughleaf dogwood fruit.

== Distribution ==
Cornus drummondii can be found in the United States of America as far west and south as Texas, as far east as New York, and as far north as Ontario in Canada.

== Ethnobotany ==
Cornus drummondii was used by the Iroquois to treat gonorrhea by infusing switches mixed with the fruit from the tree.

== Wetland Indicator Status ==
Cornus drummondii is considered Facultative (FAC) meaning it can occur in wetland and non-wetland environment.

== Wildlife use ==
There are over 40 species of bird that eat the roughleaf dogwood fruit such as mockingbirds (Mimus polyglottos), bluebirds (Sialia sialis), and cardinals (Cardinalis cardinalis). Other fruit eating animals that use roughleaf dogwood include raccoons, squirrels, deer, rabbits, skunks, and black bears. Birds such as the wood warbler, yellow-rumped warbler, kinglets, and flycatchers are known to feast on the fruits in flocks in the fall and winter. Frugivory by birds is a how C. drummondii is commonly dispersed.

== Conservation status ==
Cornus drummondii is critically imperiled (S1) in Georgia, Minnesota, and New York. C. drummondii is secure (S5) in the states Iowa, Indiana, and Kentucky. There is no status rank (SNR/SU/SNA) for Cornus drummondii in Texas, Oklahoma, Louisiana, Mississippi, Alabama, Arkansas, Tennessee, Kansas, Nebraska, South Dakota, Missouri, Illinois, Ohio, Pennsylvania, and Michigan. At the global scale Cornus drummondii is listed as "Least Concern" on the IUCN Red List of Threatened Species.
