= Cornus wardiana =

Scientific classification
- Kingdom: Plantae
- Clade: Tracheophytes
- Clade: Angiosperms
- Clade: Eudicots
- Clade: Asterids
- Order: Cornales
- Family: Cornaceae
- Genus: Cornus
- Species: C. wardiana

Binomial name
- Cornus wardiana Rushforth & Wahlsteen

Species of plant

Cornus wardiana (evergreen dwarf cornel or bunchberry) is a species of flowering plants in the family Cornaceae found in northern Myanmar.
