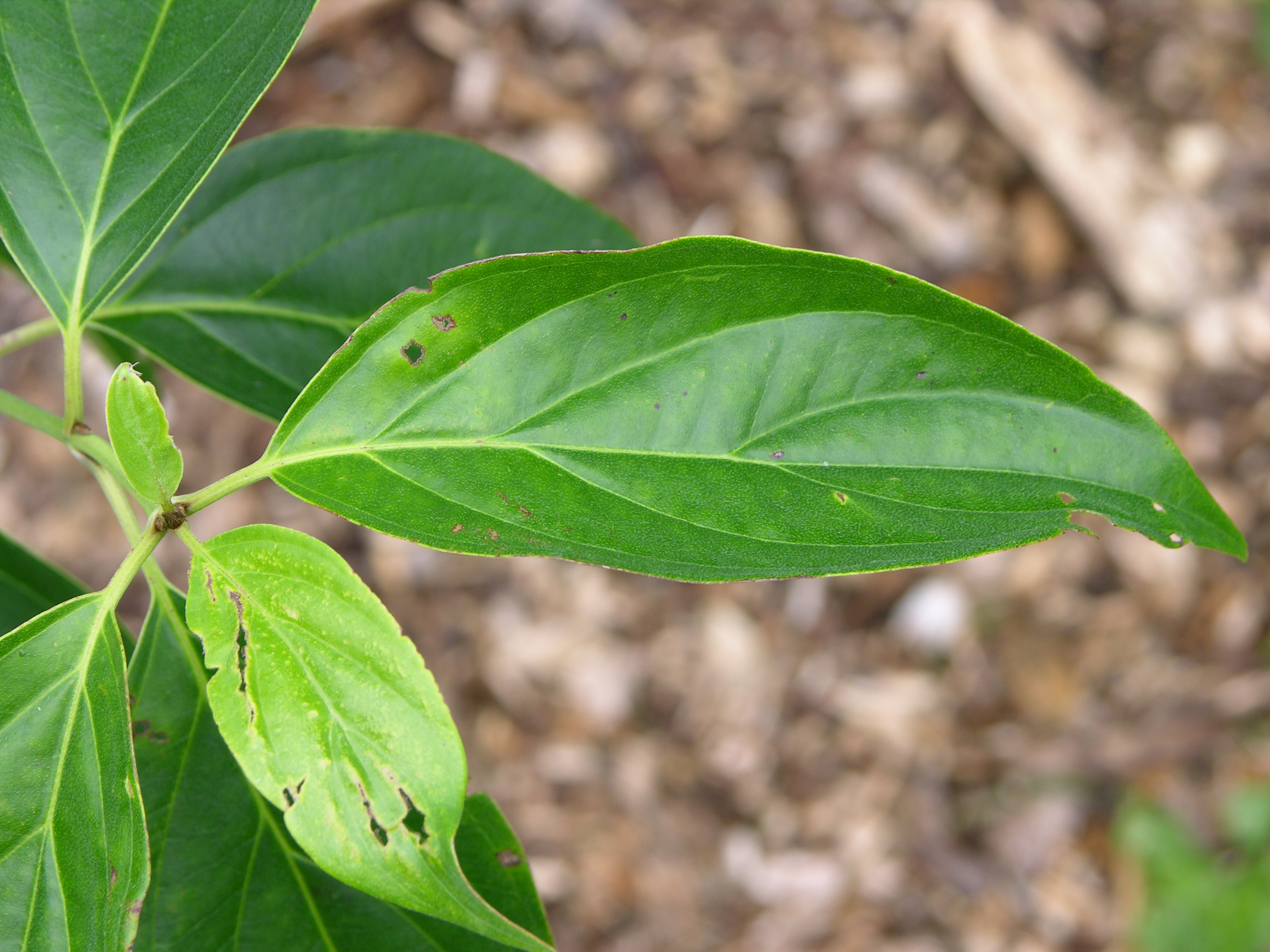
- Leaves

Scientific classification
- Kingdom: Plantae
- Clade: Tracheophytes
- Clade: Angiosperms
- Clade: Eudicots
- Clade: Asterids
- Order: Cornales
- Family: Cornaceae
- Genus: Cornus
- Subgenus: Cornus subg. Kraniopsis
- Species: C. wilsoniana

Binomial name
- Cornus wilsoniana Wangerin

Synonyms
- List: Cornus fordii Hemsl.; Cornus kweichowensis H.L.Li; Swida wilsoniana (Wangerin) Soják

= Cornus wilsoniana =

Species of plant

Cornus wilsoniana, called ghost dogwood or Wilson's dogwood, is species of Cornus native to central and southeastern China. Typically growing to 5 to 10 m, though rarely reaching 40 m, this tree features leaves with white undersides, profuse white flowers in May, and striking grey-green mottled bark on mature specimens. The purplish-black fruit is harvested for vegetable oil, the leaves are used for fodder, and the timber is valued for making tools and furniture. Its well-shaped crown and attractive bark have led to proposals for its development as a street tree.
