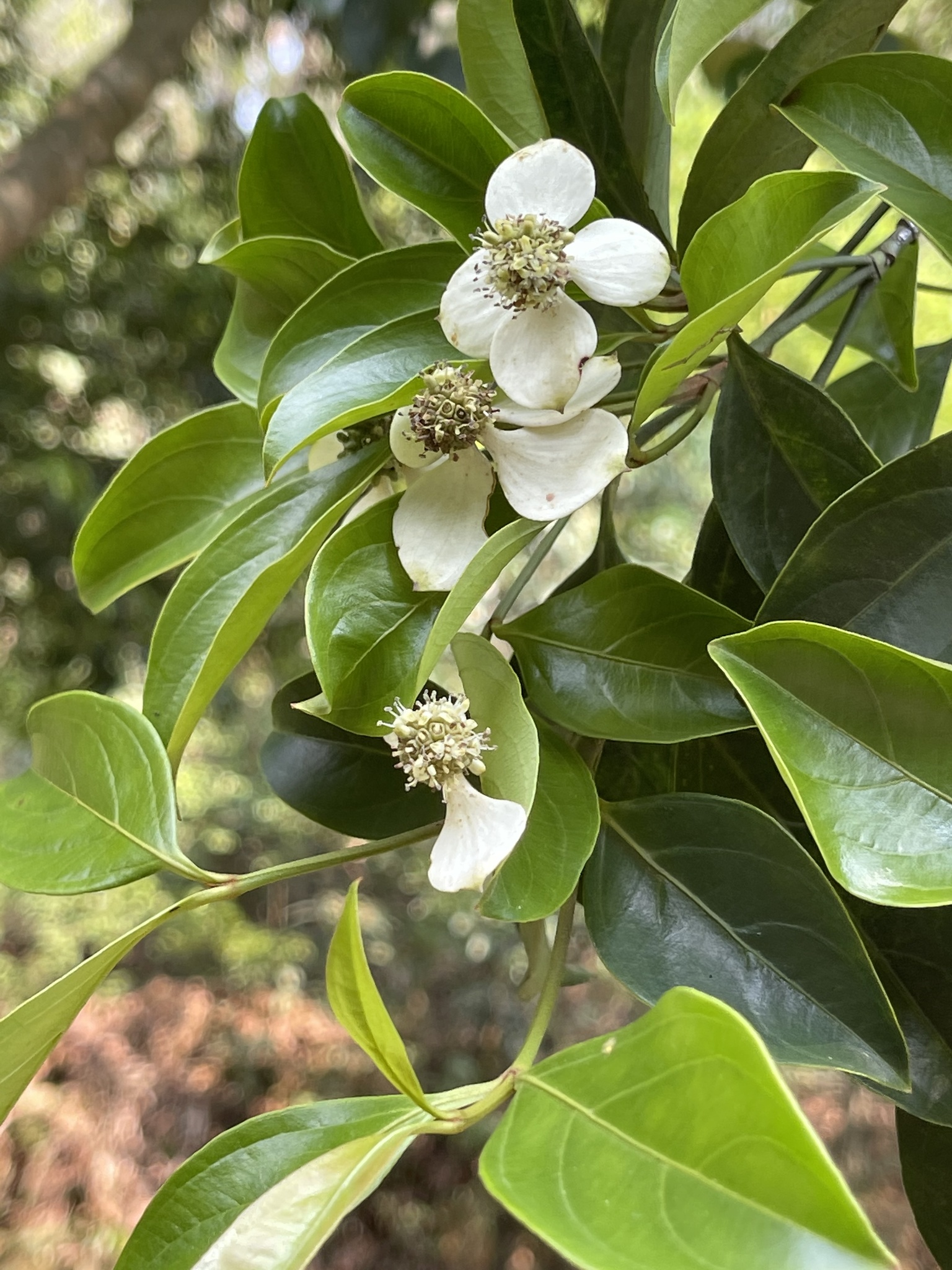

Conservation status
- Least Concern (IUCN 3.1)

Scientific classification
- Kingdom: Plantae
- Clade: Tracheophytes
- Clade: Angiosperms
- Clade: Eudicots
- Clade: Asterids
- Order: Cornales
- Family: Cornaceae
- Genus: Cornus
- Subgenus: Cornus subg. Syncarpea
- Species: C. hongkongensis

Binomial name
- Cornus hongkongensis (Hemsl.)

Synonyms
- Benthamia hongkongensis (Hemsl.) Nakai; Benthamia japonica var. sinensis Benth.; Benthamidia hongkongensis (Hemsl.) H.Hara; Cynoxylon hongkongense (Hemsl.) Nakai; Dendrobenthamia hongkongensis (Hemsl.) Hutch.

= Cornus hongkongensis =

Species of tree

Cornus hongkongensis (sometimes called Benthamidia hongkongensis, Dendrobenthamia hongkongensis, or Hong Kong dogwood) is a species of evergreen dogwood in the family Cornaceae. It is native to China, Laos, and Vietnam. It grows to 15 meters in height and blooms in late spring to early summer, exhibiting an abundance of fragrant flowers. Because this species of dogwood also exhibits a range of minor differences in morphology due largely to geographic distribution, it has been divided into a number of subspecies. It has been described as an excellent ornamental tree species.

== Etymology ==
Cornus means 'horn', and is a derivative of the ancient Latin name for the Cornelian cherry.

Hongkongensis means 'from Hongkong'.
