= Cornus torreyi =

Scientific classification
- Kingdom: Plantae
- Clade: Tracheophytes
- Clade: Angiosperms
- Clade: Eudicots
- Clade: Asterids
- Order: Cornales
- Family: Cornaceae
- Genus: Cornus
- Species: C. torreyi

Binomial name
- Cornus torreyi S.Watson

Synonyms
- List: Cornus alba var. occidentalis (Torr. & A.Gray) B.Boivin; Cornus californica C.A.Mey.; Cornus californica var. pubescens J.F.Macbr.; Cornus greenei J.M.Coult. & W.H.Evans; Cornus occidentalis (Torr. & A.Gray) Coville; Cornus pubescens Nutt.; Cornus sericea f. occidentalis (Torr. & A.Gray) Fosberg; Cornus sericea var. occidentalis Torr. & A.Gray; Cornus sericea subsp. occidentalis (Torr. & A.Gray) Fosberg; Cornus stolonifera var. occidentalis (Torr. & A.Gray) C.L.Hitchc.; Cornus stolonifera subsp. occidentalis (Torr. & A.Gray) A.E.Murray; Swida occidentalis (Torr. & A.Gray) Soják; Swida pubescens Standl.; Thelycrania pubescens (Standl.) Pojark.

Species of plant

Cornus torreyi, the western dogwood or creek dogwood, is a species of flowering plant in the family Cornaceae. It is native to the west coast of North America, from Alaska down to northern Baja California, and inland to Idaho and Montana. A deciduous shrub usually 1 to 6 m (3 to 20 ft) tall, its slender branches turn purplish-red in the sun but remain green in the shade.
