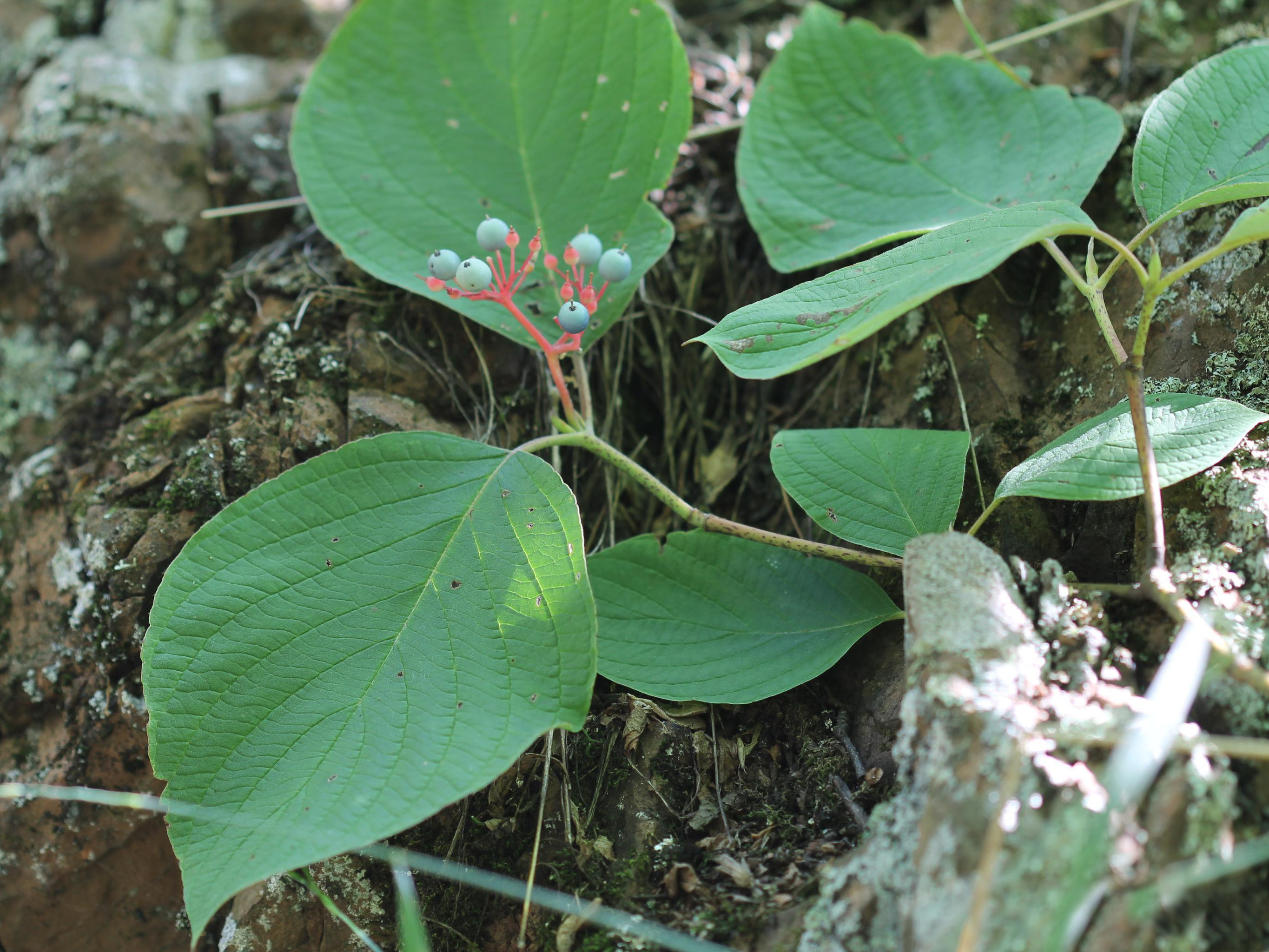
- Branch with fruit and leaves

Conservation status
- Secure (NatureServe)

Scientific classification
- Kingdom: Plantae
- Clade: Embryophytes
- Clade: Tracheophytes
- Clade: Angiosperms
- Clade: Eudicots
- Clade: Asterids
- Order: Cornales
- Family: Cornaceae
- Genus: Cornus
- Subgenus: Cornus subg. Kraniopsis
- Species: C. rugosa

Binomial name
- Cornus rugosa Lam.
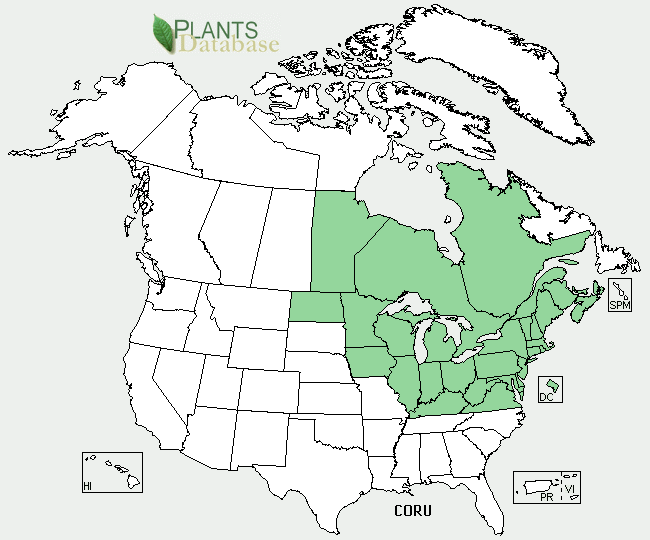
- Range within North America

Synonyms
- Swida rugosa (Lam.) Rydb.; Thelycrania rugosa (Lam.) Pojark.; Cornus circinata L'Hér.; Cornus circinata f. variegata Allabach; Cornus circinnata Cham. & Schltdl.; Cornus rugosa f. eucycla Fernald; Cornus tomentosa Steud.; Cornus tomentosula Michx.; Cornus verrucosa G. Nicholson; Cornus virginiana Lam.

= Cornus rugosa =

Roundleaf dogwood

Species of flowering plant

Cornus rugosa, commonly called roundleaf dogwood or round-leaved dogwood, is a deciduous tree native to northern parts of the eastern and central United States and southern parts of central and eastern Canada.

== Description ==
Swida rugosa is a shrub or small tree, 1–4 m (3–13 ft) tall, with yellowish-green twigs that may have red or purple blotches. Pith is white. Leaves are oppositely arranged, round orbicularly shaped with an acuminate tip, have an entire margin, and are woolly to hairless below. Leaves have 6-8 pairs of lateral veins and 7–15 cm long. Leaf scars are broadly U-shaped with 3 bundle scars.

White flowers appear in early summer arranged on flat topped cymes. The flowers themselves are pedunculate with 4 calyx lobes and 4 petals. The cymes are 3–6 cm (1 1/4–2 1/4 in) wide and contain 20–50 flowers. Fruits are blue to greenish white drupe that matures in October.

Roundleaf dogwood prefers well drained to normal moisture soil and, like most dogwoods, is shade tolerant.

== Ecology ==
Roundleaf dogwood is a host species for the spring azure and gossamer wings.

Fruits are eaten by ruffed grouse and sharp-tailed grouse. Twigs are consumed by white tailed deer, Eastern cottontail, and mice.

== Conservation ==
Roundleaf dogwood is listed as endangered in Maryland and is a species of special concern in Rhode Island.
