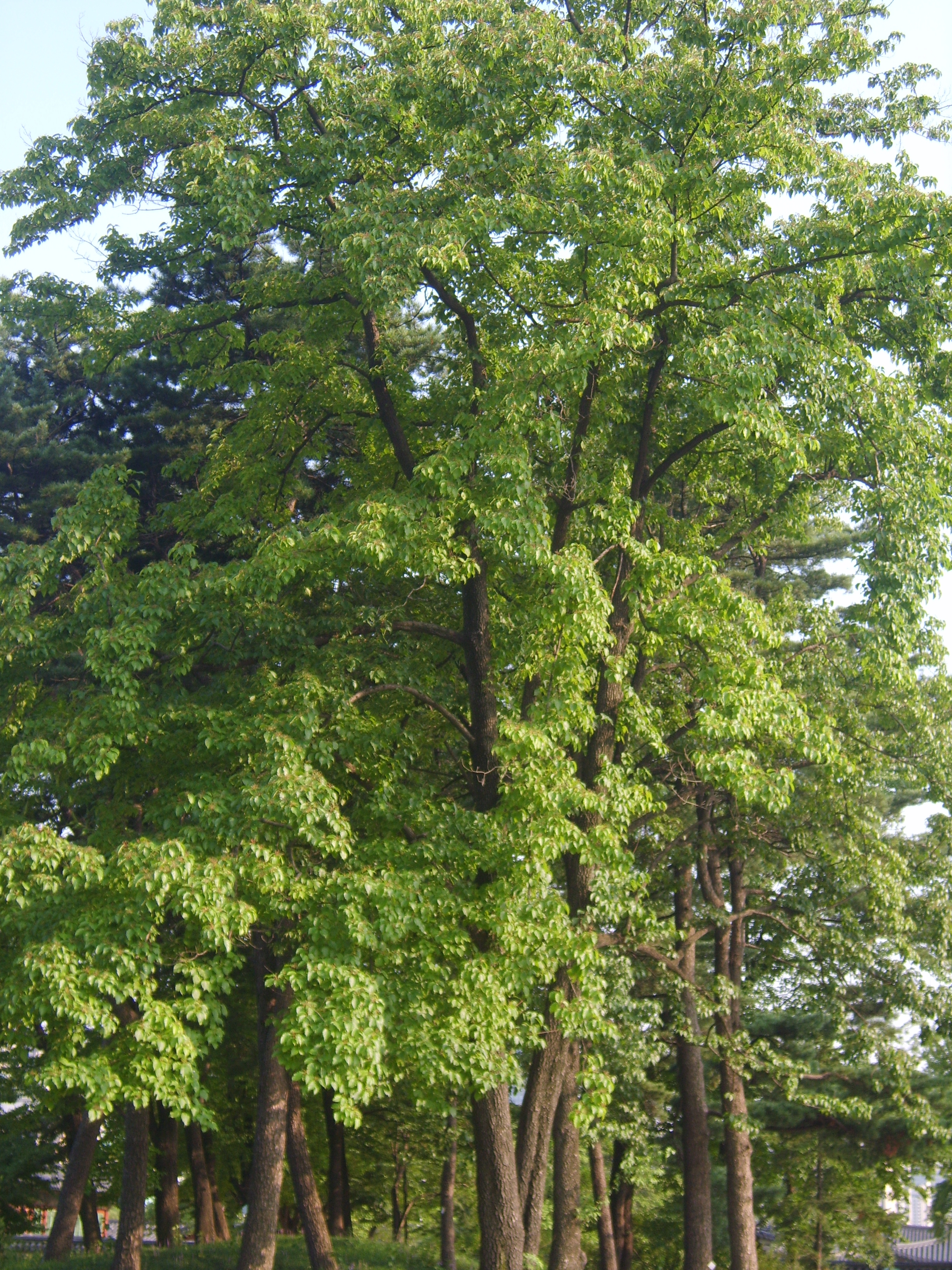

Conservation status
- Least Concern (IUCN 3.1)

Scientific classification
- Kingdom: Plantae
- Clade: Tracheophytes
- Clade: Angiosperms
- Clade: Eudicots
- Clade: Asterids
- Order: Cornales
- Family: Cornaceae
- Genus: Cornus
- Subgenus: Cornus subg. Kraniopsis
- Species: C. walteri

Binomial name
- Cornus walteri Wangerin

Synonyms
- Cornus coreana Wangerin; Cornus henryi Hemsl. ex Wangerin; Cornus walteri var. confertiflora W.P.Fang & W.K.Hu; Cornus walteri var. insignis W.P.Fang & W.K.Hu; Cornus yunnanensis H.L.Li; Swida coreana (Wangerin) Soják; Swida walteri (Wangerin) Soják; Swida walteri var. confertiflora (W.P.Fang & W.K.Hu) W.P.Fang & W.K.Hu; Swida walteri var. insignis (W.P.Fang & W.K.Hu) W.P.Fang & W.K.Hu; Thelycrania coreana (Wangerin) Pojark.

= Cornus walteri =

Korean dogwood

Species of flowering plant

Cornus walteri, also called Walter's dogwood, is a deciduous shrub or small tree 8–16 m tall, native to eastern Asia in Korea and much of China from Liaoning to Yunnan.

Cornus walteri has opposite, simple leaves, 5–12 cm long. The flowers are produced in inflorescences 6–8 cm diameter, each flower individually small and whitish. The flowering is in spring, after it leafs out. The fruit is a round, reddish-purple "drupaceous berry", 2.5-3.5 cm diameter.

It is closely related to the European common dogwood (C. sanguinea).

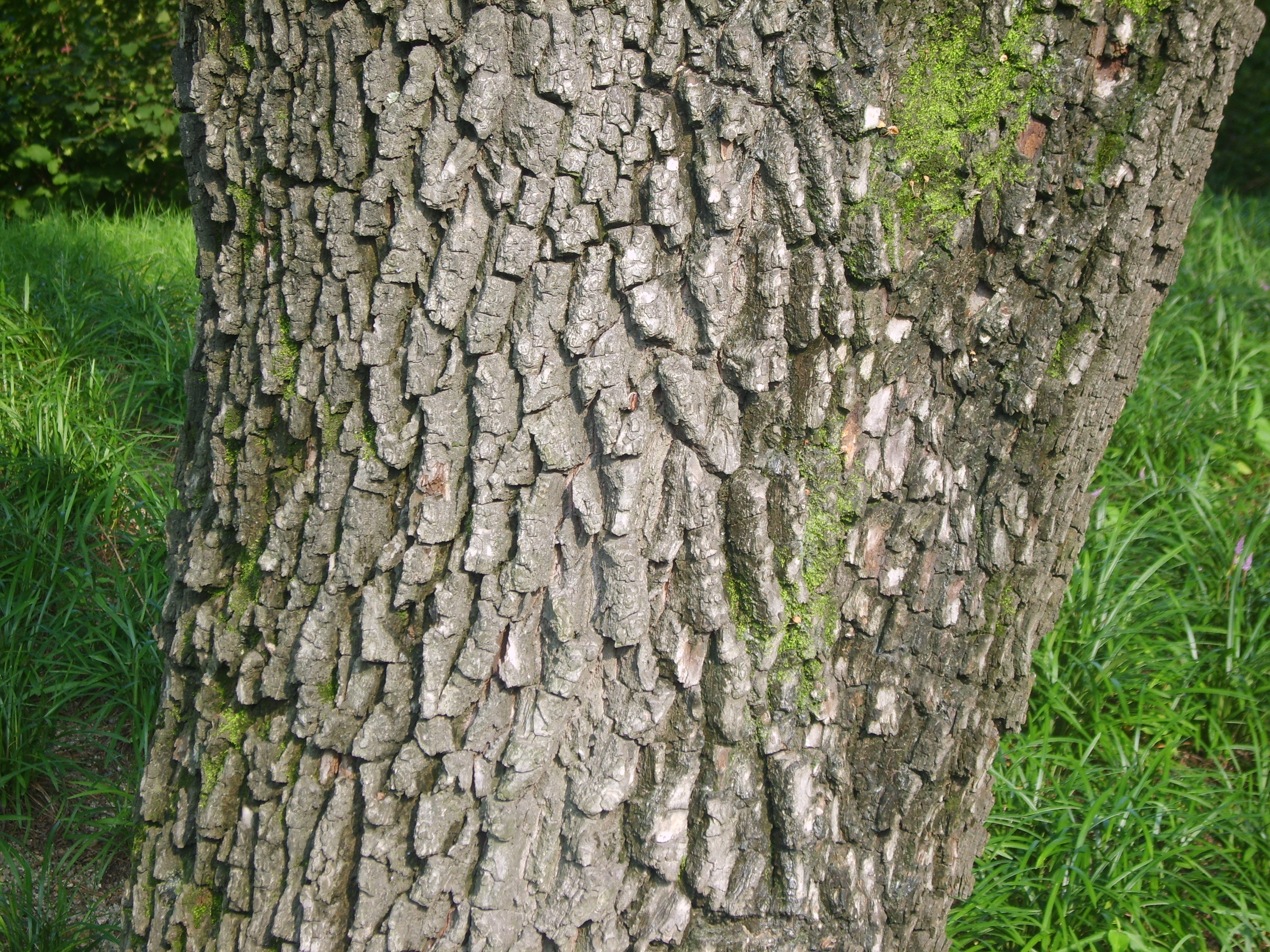
Cornus walteri
