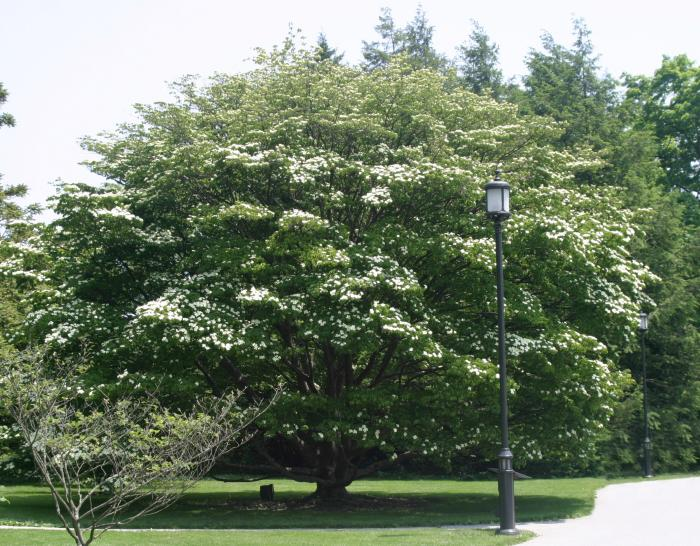

Conservation status
- Least Concern (IUCN 3.1)

Scientific classification
- Kingdom: Plantae
- Clade: Tracheophytes
- Clade: Angiosperms
- Clade: Eudicots
- Clade: Asterids
- Order: Cornales
- Family: Cornaceae
- Genus: Cornus
- Subgenus: Cornus subg. Syncarpea
- Species: C. kousa

Binomial name
- Cornus kousa F.Buerger ex Hance

Synonyms
- Benthamia kousa (F.Buerger ex Hance) Nakai; Cynoxylon kousa (F.Buerger ex Hance) Nakai

= Cornus kousa =

Species of tree commonly known as kousa dogwood

Cornus kousa is a small deciduous tree in the flowering plant family Cornaceae. Common names include kousa, kousa dogwood, Chinese dogwood, Korean dogwood, and Japanese dogwood.

The tree grows up to 10 metres (33 feet) tall. Whitish bracts appear in spring, along with cymes of yellowish flowers. The fruit is a red berry about 2 cm (3/4 in) wide.

It is native to East Asia and widely cultivated elsewhere, being naturalised in New York State. A number of hybrids and cultivars exist. The sweet berry pulp is edible raw, but the rind is usually discarded.

== Description ==
The tree reaches 10 metres (33 feet) in height and 6 m (20 ft) in width. Like other Cornus, it has opposite, simple leaves, 4–11 centimetres (1 1/2–4 1/4 in) long and 3.6–5 cm (1 1/2–2 in). The fall foliage is a showy red color.

When in bloom, the tree is covered by whitish bracts (sometimes fading to red) 3–6 cm (1 1/4–2 1/4 in) in width. They are more showy than the yellowish to greenish flowers, of which there are 20–40 per cyme.

The fruit is a globose pink to red compound berry about 2 cm (3/4 in) in diameter, which has a sweet flavour.

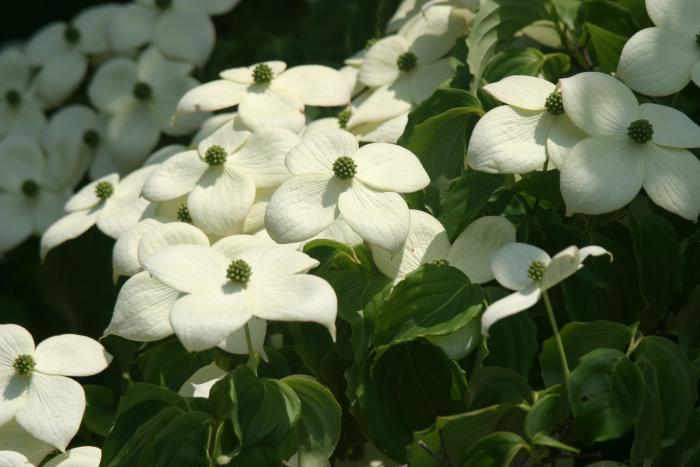
White bracts and small green flowers

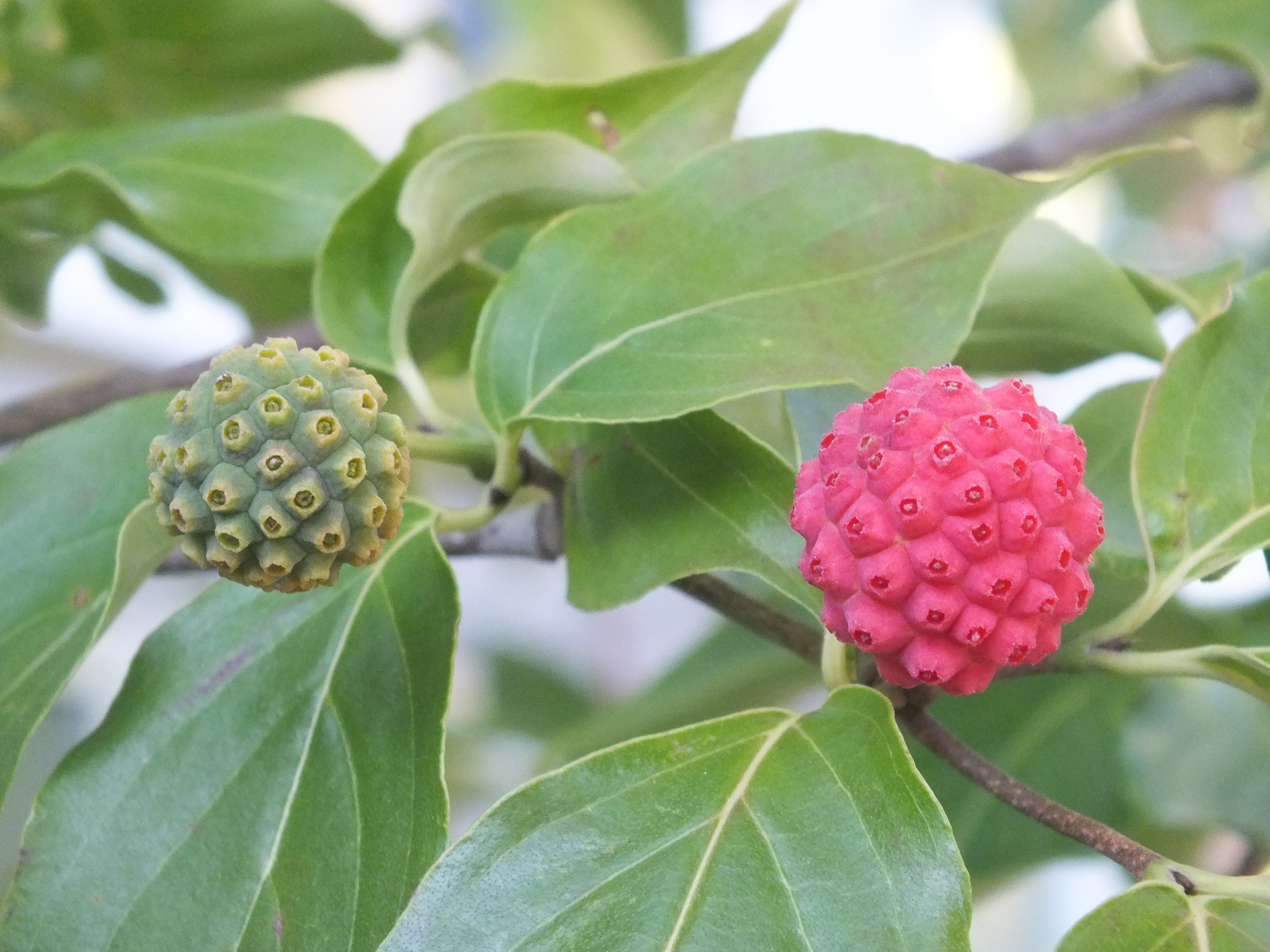
Leaves and fruit in summer

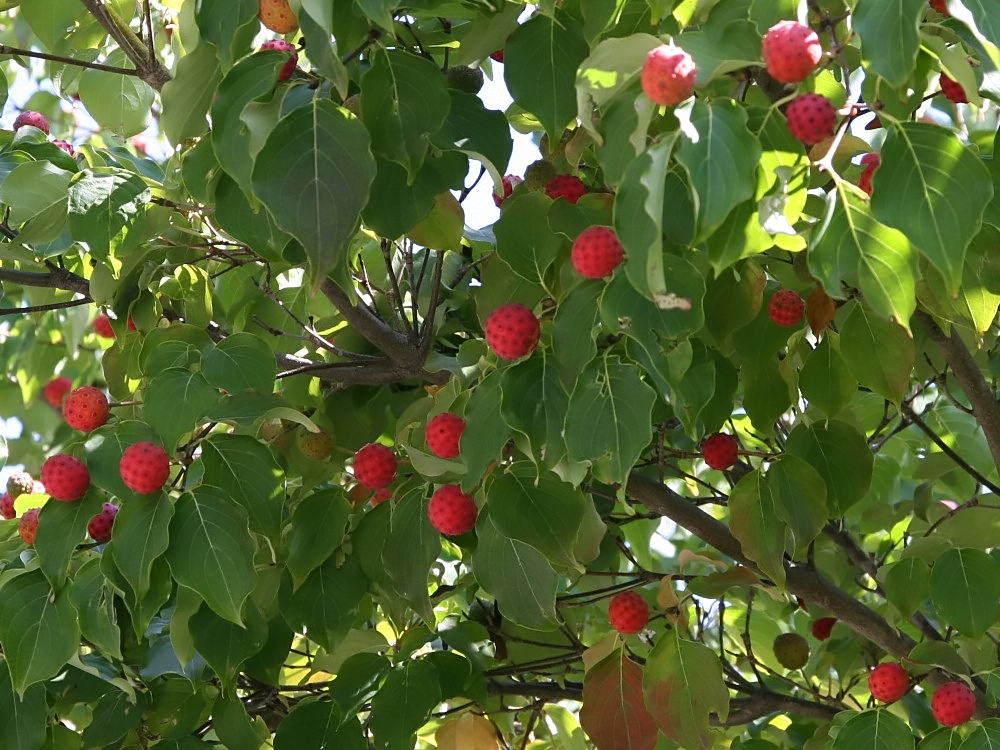
Foliage and fruit in fall

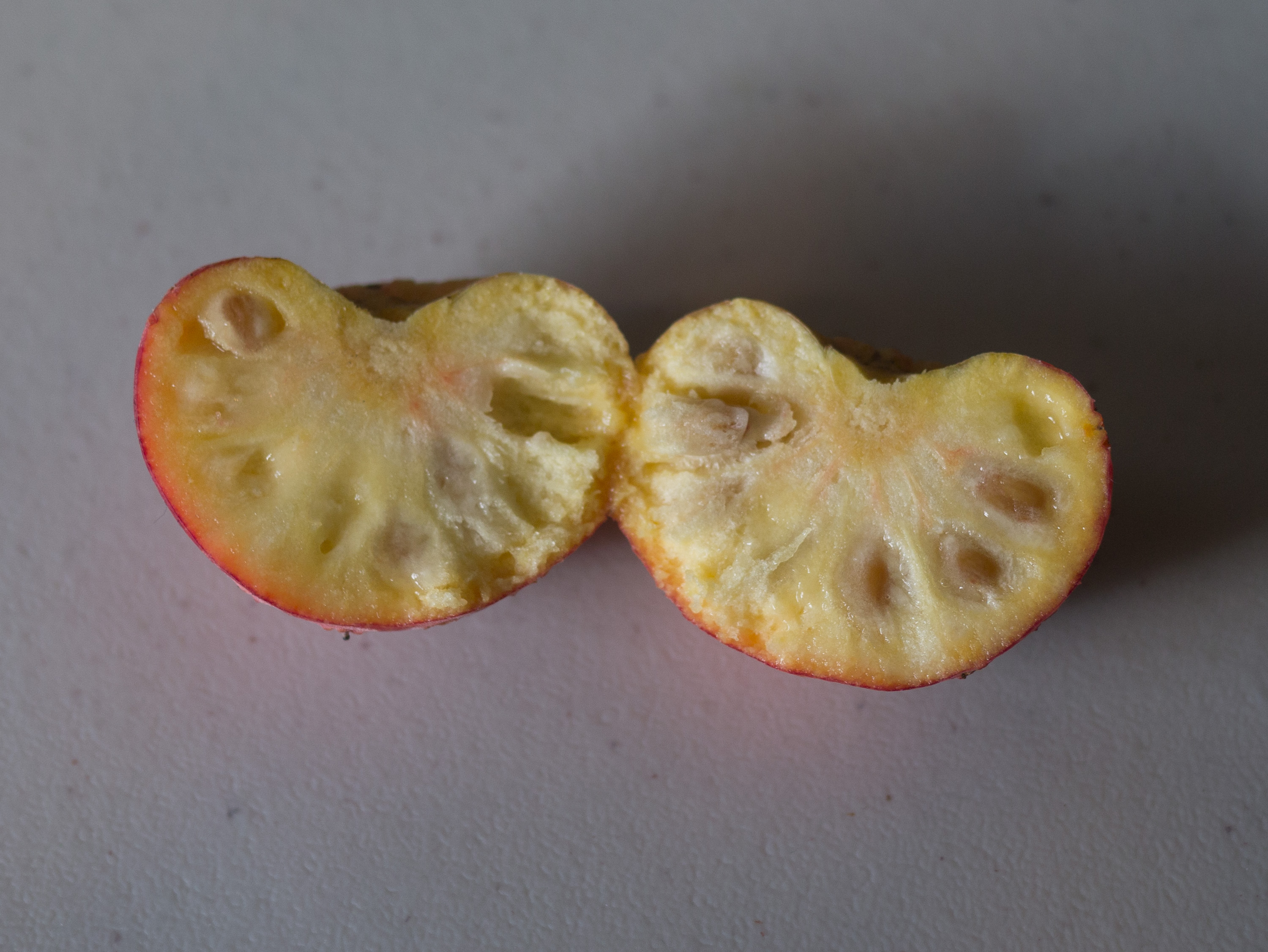
Halved fruit

=== Similar species ===
It can be distinguished from the flowering dogwood (Cornus florida) of eastern North America by its more upright habit, flowering about a month later, and by the pointed rather than rounded flower bracts.

== Taxonomy ==
Synonyms include Benthamia kousa and Cynoxylon kousa.

There are two recognized subspecies/varieties:

- Cornus kousa F.Buerger ex Hance or Cornus kousa Hance subsp. kousa – Japanese dogwood, native to Japan and Korea.
- Cornus kousa Hance subsp. chinensis (Osborn) Q. Y. Xiang – Chinese dogwood, native to China. This variety supposedly flowers more freely and produces larger flower bracts, with leaves that are also said to be larger than average. The validity of this variety, however, is questioned by some authorities.

== Distribution and habitat ==
It is a plant native to East Asia including Korea, China, and Japan. Widely cultivated as an ornamental, it is naturalized in the state of New York.

== Ecology ==
It is resistant to the dogwood anthracnose disease, caused by the fungus Discula destructiva, unlike C. florida, which is very susceptible and commonly killed by it; for this reason, C. kousa is being widely planted as an ornamental tree in areas affected by the disease.

== Cultivation ==
Hybrids between C. kousa and C. florida (Cornus × rutgersensis Mattera, T. Molnar, & Struwe) and C. kousa and C. florida (Cornus × elwinortonii Mattera, T. Molnar, & Struwe) have been created by Rutgers University. Several selected for their disease resistance and good flower appearance have been named, patented, and released.

Cultivars include:

Cultivar	Bract color	Foliage	Habit	Notes
'Beni Fuji'	The deepest red-pink bracts of any cultivar.			The color may not be as strong in warm summer areas.
'Elizabeth Lustgarten' and 'Lustgarten Weeping'			Notable for weeping habit, grow to 15' with branches that arch downwards.	The habit is rounded and gentle, a mature specimen is attractive.
'Gold Star'	White	Center of each leaf has a broad gold band, with stems that are somewhat reddish.	Relatively slow-growing, but in time does form a small-medium rounded tree.	The contrast between the red fruit and gold-splashed foliage can be striking.
'Little Beauty'			Forms a small, densely branched tree that may never exceed 15' tall.	Other traits are as per the species.
'Milky Way'	Pure White		Extremely floriferous and sets a very heavy crop of fruit. When in bloom, the bracts can conceal the foliage.	One of the most common cultivars. This chinensis cultivar is probably composed of over a dozen similar clones.
'Satomi' or 'Miss Satomi' (also sold as 'Rosabella')	Deep pink bracts.	Leaves turning purple and deep red in autumn.	Spreading medium-sized shrub.	This is a very popular cultivar. Warm summers seem to dull the color and many plants bloom light pink or white-pink.
'Snowboy'		Sports gray-green leaves that are edged in white, with occasional splashes of variegation throughout the foliage.	Very slow-growing.	The plant is attractive when well grown. Best sited in a shady location to avoid leaf scorch.
'Summer Stars'			Blooms heavily and grows to 25' tall with a vase shape.	The flower bracts on this selection are not as large as those of other cultivars, but they are retained longer.
'Temple Jewel'	White	Variegated form with leaves that show a light marbling of green, gold and light pink that turns mostly green with age.	Grows well to 20' tall and wider with a dense habit.	
'Variegata'		Various clones exist with differing degrees of yellow or white variegation.	Most are slower growing.	The pattern may be unstable, plus the plants can produce green growth reversions. It benefits from siting in some shade.
'Wolf Eyes'		Variegated form with leaves that show a uniform white margin. The leaf margins are often prominently wavy. In fall, the leaves develop attractive pink to red coloration.	Shrubby and slow-growing, to 10' tall and wide.	This is a very popular cultivar. The variegation pattern is quite stable and resistant to burning. A shaded planting site is desirable.

=== AGM cultivars ===
As of July 2017, the following cultivars have gained the Royal Horticultural Society's Award of Garden Merit:

- 'John Slocock'
- 'Miss Satomi'
- 'Summer Fun'
- 'Teutonia'
- 'Wolf Eyes'
- var. chinensis 'China Girl'
- var. chinensis 'Wisley Queen'
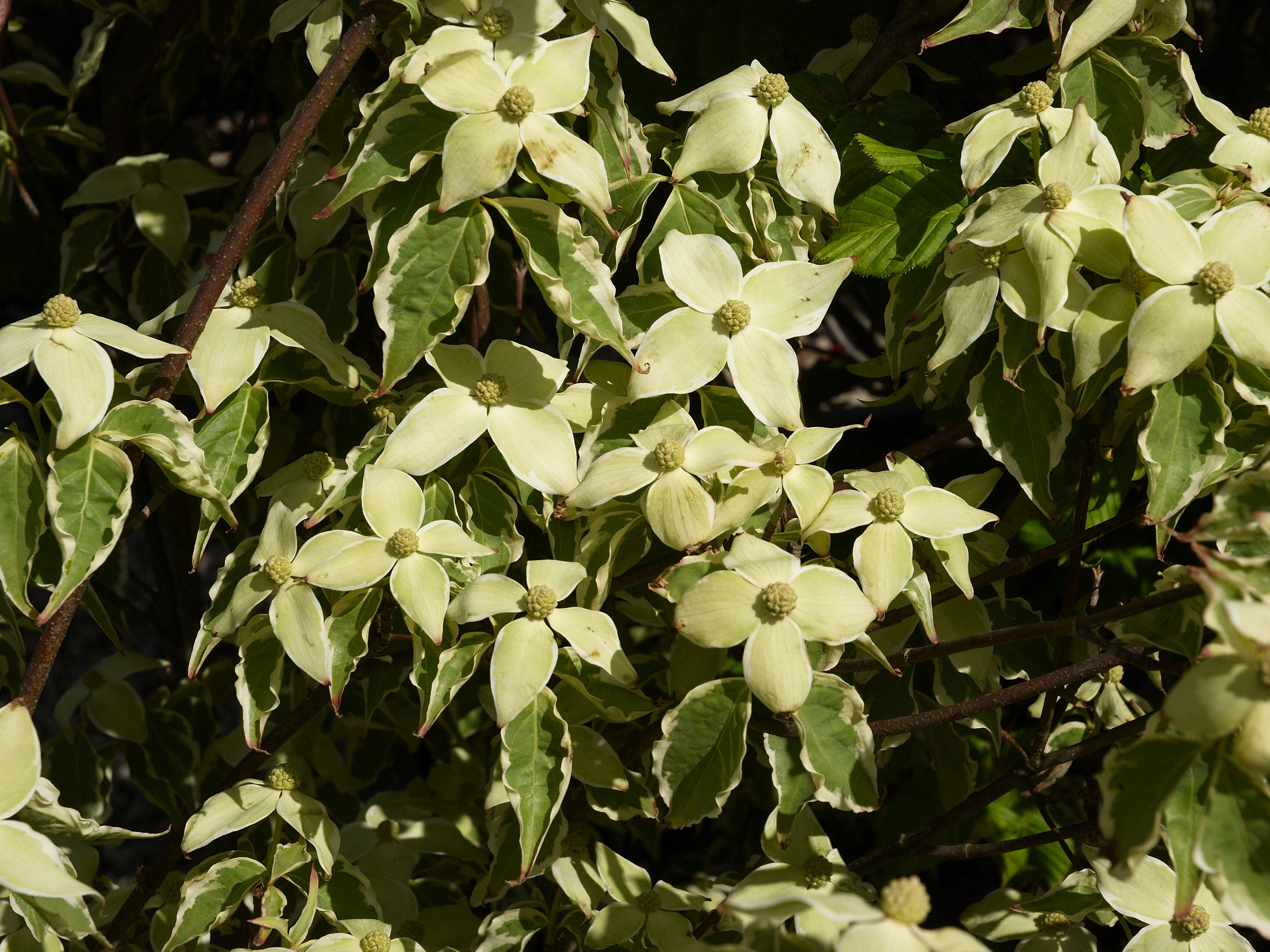
C. kousa 'Samaratin' in an arboretum in Vossem, Belgium

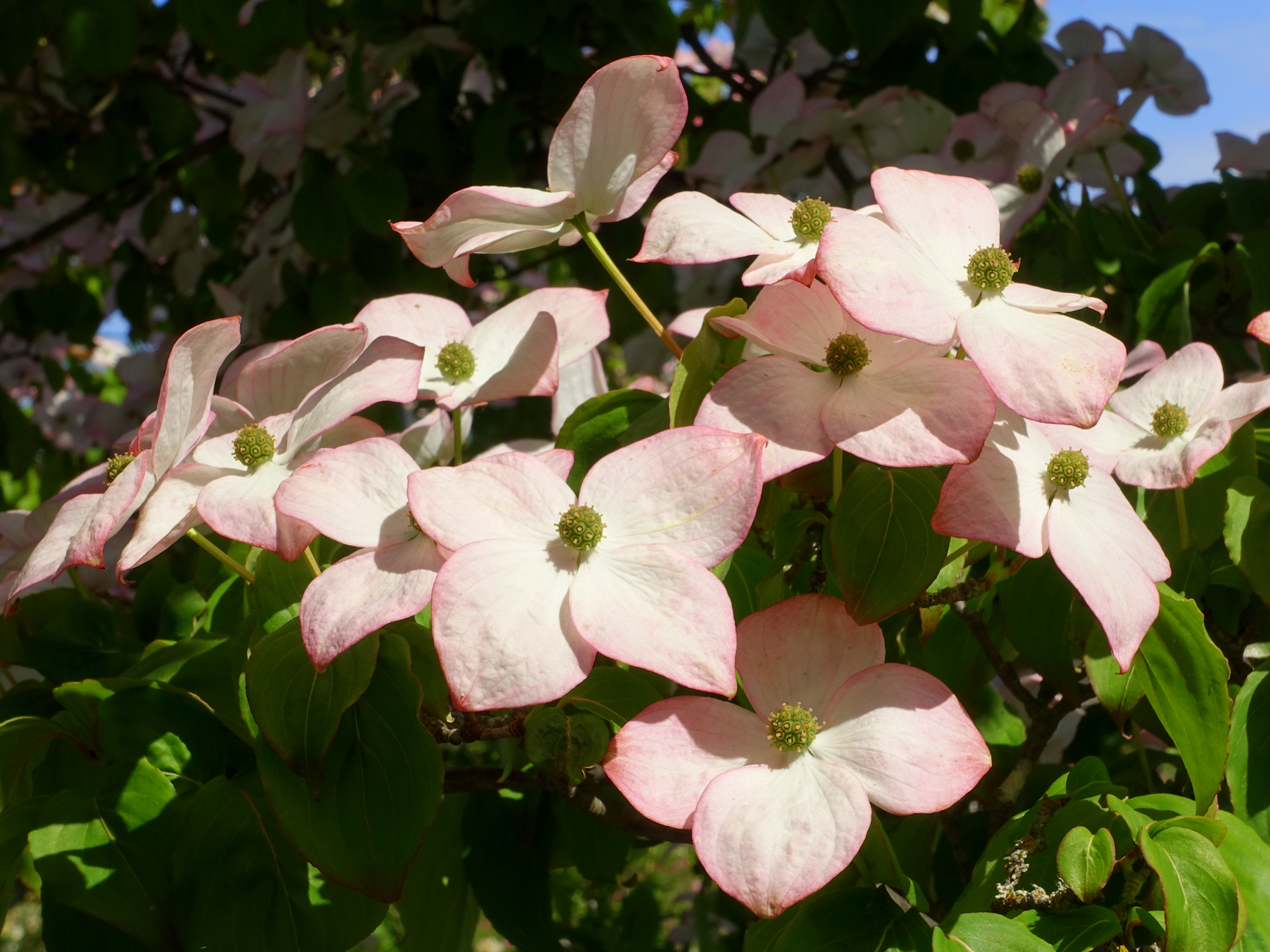
Cornus kousa 'Satomi' in the VanDusen Botanical Garden in Vancouver

== Uses ==
The berry pulp is edible, with a similar flavour to a ripe persimmon. The rind of the berries is edible but usually discarded because it is tough with a bitter taste.

The fruit is sometimes used for making wine. While less popular than the berries, the young leaves can be cooked and eaten.
