= Cornus excelsa =

Conservation status
- Least Concern (IUCN 3.1)

Scientific classification
- Kingdom: Plantae
- Clade: Tracheophytes
- Clade: Angiosperms
- Clade: Eudicots
- Clade: Asterids
- Order: Cornales
- Family: Cornaceae
- Genus: Cornus
- Subgenus: Cornus subg. Kraniopsis
- Species: C. excelsa

Binomial name
- Cornus excelsa Kunth

Synonyms
- Swida excelsa (Kunth) Soják; Thelycrania excelsa (Kunth) Pojark.; Cornus lanceolata Rose; Cornus pubescens Willd.; Cornus tolucensis Kunth; Swida lanceolata (Rose) Holub; Swida tolucensis (Kunth) Holub; Thelycrania lanceolata (Rose) Pojark.; Thelycrania tolucensis (Kunth) Pojark.

Species of flowering plant

Cornus excelsa is a species of flowering plant in the dogwood genus (Cornus). It is native to mountain forests of Mexico, Guatemala, and Honduras.

== Description ==
Cornus excelsa is a tree which grows up to 12 meters tall, with a trunk up to 15 cm in diameter.

== Range and habitat ==
Cornus excelsa is found in the mountains of Mexico and northern Central America, including the Sierra Madre Oriental, southern Sierra Madre Occidental, Trans-Mexican Volcanic Belt, Sierra Madre de Oaxaca, Sierra Madre del Sur, and Chiapas Highlands of Mexico, the Sierra Madre de Chiapas of Mexico and Guatemala, and the Guatemalan Highlands of Guatemala and Honduras.

It is typically found in cloud forests, where it is a common early successional tree found in secondary vegetation. It is also found on ridges and slopes in montane oak and pine–oak forests. It ranges from 1,500 to 2,800 meters elevation.

Seedlings can be readily grown from chemically scarified seeds.
