= Coleophora salicivorella =

Scientific classification
- Kingdom: Animalia
- Phylum: Arthropoda
- Class: Insecta
- Order: Lepidoptera
- Family: Coleophoridae
- Genus: Coleophora
- Species: C. salicivorella

Binomial name
- Coleophora salicivorella McDunnough, 1945

Species of moth

Coleophora salicivorella is a moth of the family Coleophoridae. It is found in Canada, including Ontario.

The larvae feed on the leaves of Salix species. They create a composite leaf case.
