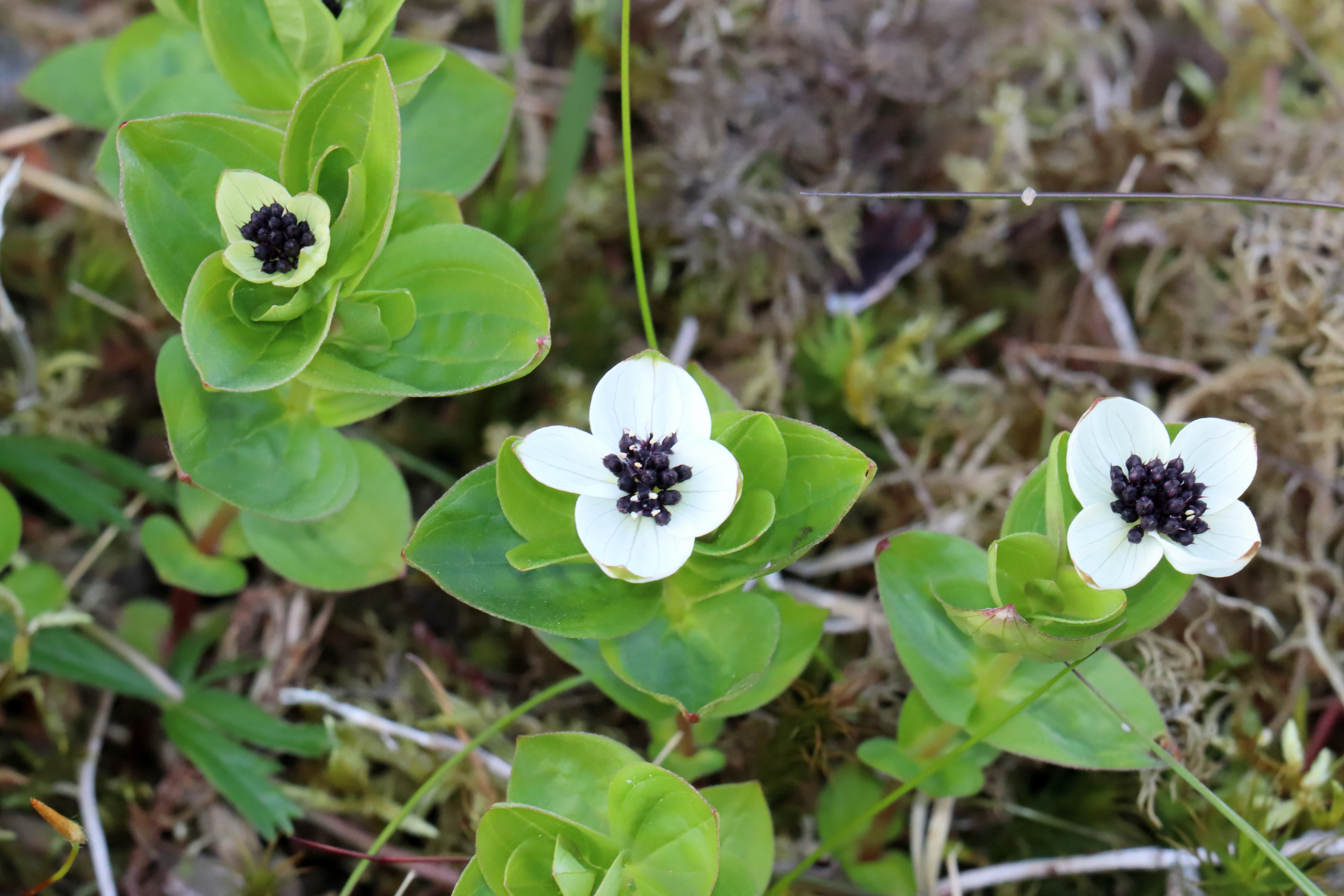
- Flowering specimen in Norway
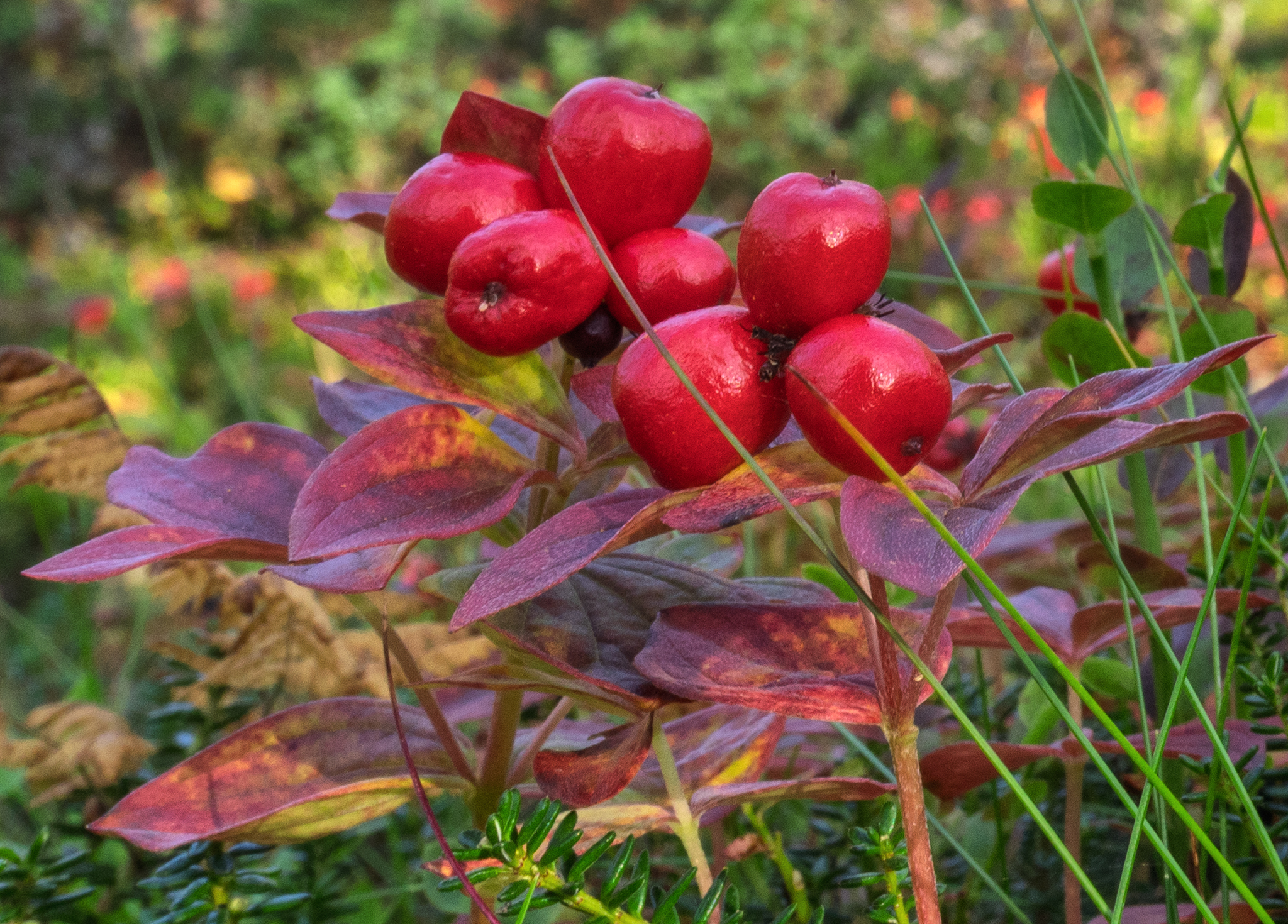
- Fruit, in Sweden

Scientific classification
- Kingdom: Plantae
- Clade: Embryophytes
- Clade: Tracheophytes
- Clade: Spermatophytes
- Clade: Angiosperms
- Clade: Eudicots
- Clade: Asterids
- Order: Cornales
- Family: Cornaceae
- Genus: Cornus
- Subgenus: Cornus subg. Arctocrania
- Species: C. suecica

Binomial name
- Cornus suecica L.

= Cornus suecica =

Species of flowering plant in the dogwood family

Cornus suecica, the dwarf cornel or bunchberry, is a species of flowering plant in the dogwood family Cornaceae, native to cool temperate and subarctic regions of Europe, Asia, and North America.

== Description ==
Dwarf cornel is a rhizomatous herbaceous perennial growing to 20 cm (8 in) tall, with few pairs of sessile cauline leaves in opposite pairs, 2–4 cm (0.8–1.6 in) long and 1–3 cm (0.4–1.2 in) broad, with 3-5 veins from the base. The flowers are small, dark purple, produced in a tight umbel that is surrounded by four conspicuous white petal-like bracts 1–1.5 cm (0.4–0.6 in) long. The fruit is a red berry.

== Habitat and range ==
Cornus suecica is a plant of heaths, moorland and mountains, often growing beneath taller species such as heather (Calluna vulgaris). Its range is nearly circumboreal, but it is absent from the continental centres of Asia and North America. In North America, the species is found in Alaska (U.S.) and British Columbia (Canada), and also eastern Canada (Labrador, New Brunswick, Newfoundland, Nova Scotia, and Quebec), as well as Greenland, but not in the intervening region.

Where Cornus canadensis, a forest species, and Cornus suecica, a heath or bog species, grow near each other in their overlapping ranges in Alaska, Labrador, Finland and Greenland, they can hybridise by cross-pollination, producing plants with intermediate characteristics.

== Taxonomy ==
Cornus suecica is included in the subgenus Arctocrania.
