= Alangium kurzii =

Conservation status
- Least Concern (IUCN 3.1)

Scientific classification
- Kingdom: Plantae
- Clade: Tracheophytes
- Clade: Angiosperms
- Clade: Eudicots
- Clade: Asterids
- Order: Cornales
- Family: Cornaceae
- Genus: Alangium
- Species: A. kurzii

Binomial name
- Alangium kurzii Craib

Synonyms
- List: Alangium begoniifolium subsp. tomentosum (Blume) Palm; Alangium begoniifolium var. typicum Wangerin; Alangium chinense var. tomentosum (Blume) Merr.; Alangium handelii Schnarf; Alangium kurzii var. handelii (Schnarf) W.P.Fang; Alangium kurzii var. laxiflorum (Y.C.Wu) W.P.Fang; Alangium kurzii var. laxifolium (Y.C.Wu) W.P.Fang; Alangium kurzii var. pachyphyllum W.P.Fang & H.Y.Su; Alangium kurzii var. umbellatum (Yen C.Yang) W.P.Fang; Alangium kwangsiense Melch.; Alangium rotundifolium var. laxiflorum Y.C.Wu; Alangium rotundifolium var. laxifolium Y.C.Wu; Alangium umbellatum Yen C.Yang; Diacicarpium tomentosum Blume; Marlea tomentosa (Blume) Endl. ex Hassk.

Species of tree

Alangium kurzii is a tree in the family Cornaceae. It is named for the German naturalist Wilhelm Sulpiz Kurz.

== Description ==
Alangium kurzii grows up to 15 metres (50 ft) tall with a trunk diameter of up to 20 centimetres (8 in). The smooth bark is dark grey. The flowers are pale greenish to creamy yellow. The ellipsoid fruits measure up to 1.5 cm (0.6 in) long.

== Distribution and habitat ==
Alangium kurzii grows naturally from China to western Malesia. Its habitat is lowland to submontane forests from sea-level to 1,300 metres (4,300 ft) altitude.
