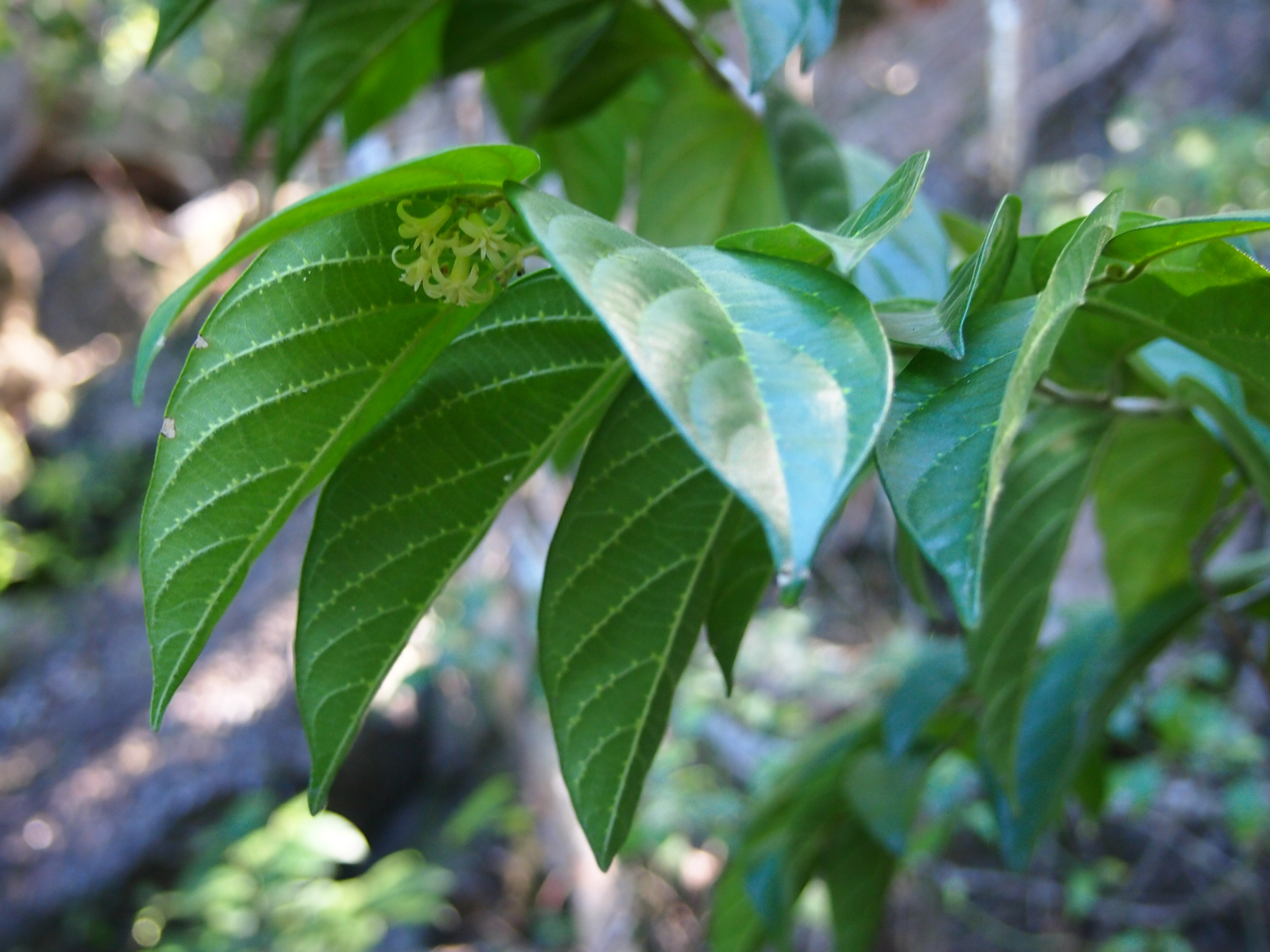

Scientific classification
- Kingdom: Plantae
- Clade: Embryophytes
- Clade: Tracheophytes
- Clade: Spermatophytes
- Clade: Angiosperms
- Clade: Eudicots
- Clade: Asterids
- Order: Cornales
- Family: Cornaceae
- Genus: Alangium
- Species: A. villosum

Binomial name
- Alangium villosum (Blume) Wangerin

Synonyms
- List: Alangium villosum var. javanicum Bloemb.; Alangium villosum subsp. salaccense (Koord. & Valeton) Bloemb.; Alangium villosum var. salaccense (Koord. & Valeton) Bloemb.; Alangium zollingeri Baill.; Karangolum zollingeri (Baill.) Kuntze; Marlea villosa (Blume) Kurz; Marlea vitiensis f. salaccensis Koord. & Valeton; Styrax villosus Blume

= Alangium villosum =

Species of plant

Alangium villosum is a species of flowering plant in the family Cornaceae, native to Java.

== Subtaxa ==
It was previously considered to contain ten described and one undescribed subspecies, but these were split out to their own species, such as the Australian Alangium villosum subsp. polyosmoides, which is now Alangium polyosmoides.
