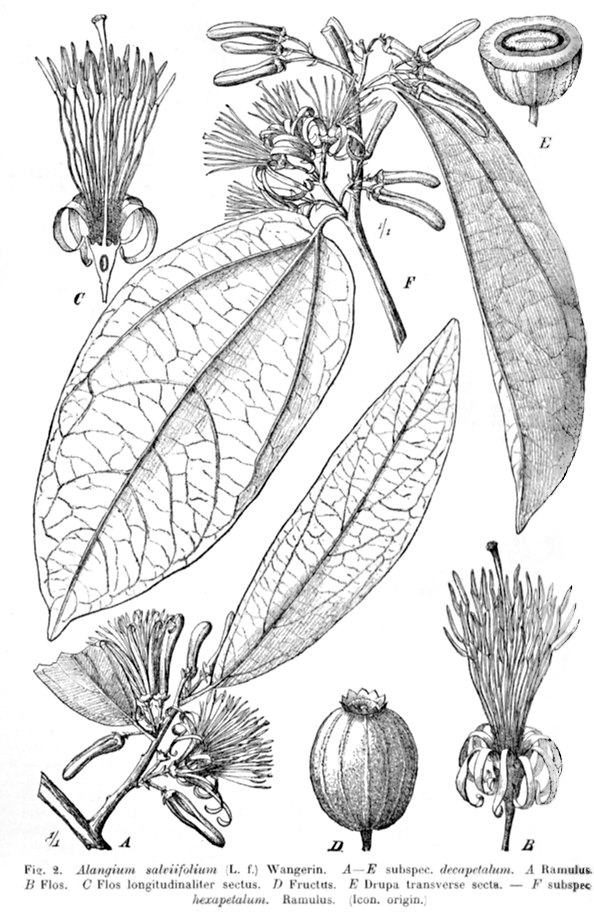

Scientific classification
- Kingdom: Plantae
- Clade: Tracheophytes
- Clade: Angiosperms
- Clade: Eudicots
- Clade: Asterids
- Order: Cornales
- Family: Cornaceae
- Genus: Alangium
- Species: A. salviifolium

Binomial name
- Alangium salviifolium (L.f.) Wangerin

Synonyms
- Alangium acuminatum Wight ex Steud.; Alangium decapetalum Lam.; Alangium lamarckii Thwaites; Alangium latifolium Miq. ex C.B.Clarke; Alangium mohillae Tul.; Alangium tomentosum Lam.; Karangolum mohillae (Tul.) Kuntze; Karangolum salviifolium (L.f.) Kuntze; Grewia salviifolia L.f.

= Alangium salviifolium =

Species of flowering plant

Alangium salviifolium, commonly known as sage-leaved alangium, is a flowering plant in the Cornaceae family. It is also commonly known as udugu chettu in Telugu, Ankolam in Malayalam, Ankola in Kannada, Akola or Ankol in Hindi and Alanji in Tamil. In India, Its mostly found in dry regions in plains and low hills and also found on roadsides.

== Etymology ==
The name Alangium is Latinized from the Malayalam name Alangi, which, in Kerala, refers to Alangium salviifolium. It was named in 1783 by Jean-Baptiste Lamarck in his Encyclopédie Méthodique

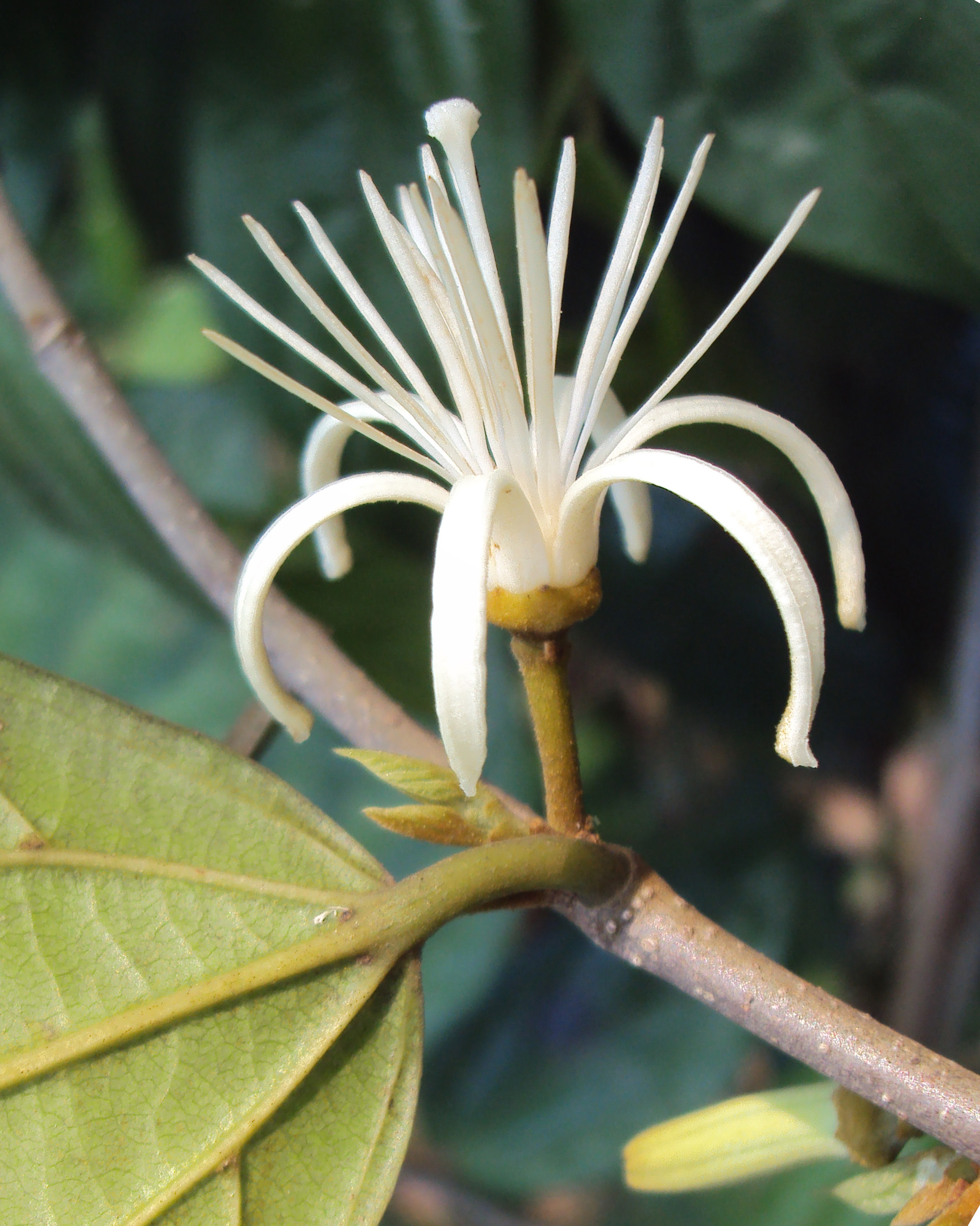
Flower, Long anther, Longer stigma

== Description ==
Sage-leaved alangium is a small, bushy tree offering a dense canopy with a short trunk. It bears fragrant white flowers which have green buds. The petals of the flower typically curl backwards exposing the multiple stamens and a linear stigma distinctly sticking out. The fruits are spherical berry like and red in color. The prominent remains of the calyx can be seen distinctly with a white color. The leaves are simple, alternate, oblong-lanceolate. The stunted branches end up with sharp ends making it look like thorns.

In India, this tree is mostly found near sandy riverine tracts and road cuttings. This tree flowers between February and April and Fruits between March and May just in time before the rainy season starts. It sheds it leaves completely when it flowers and leaves start coming when it begins to fruit. It is considered as a holy tree and temples have been built near it.

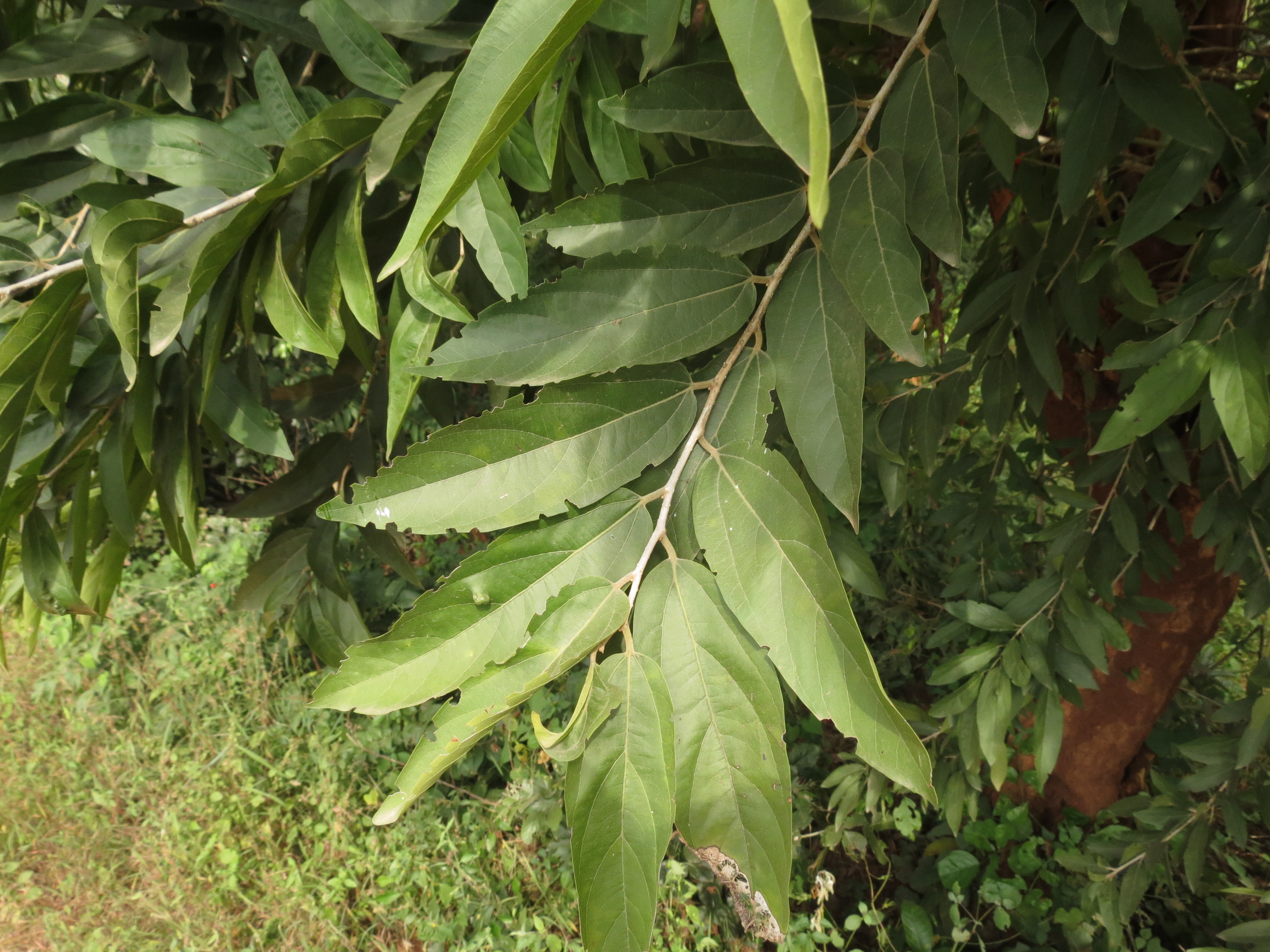
Simple Leaves, Alternate with characteristic galls

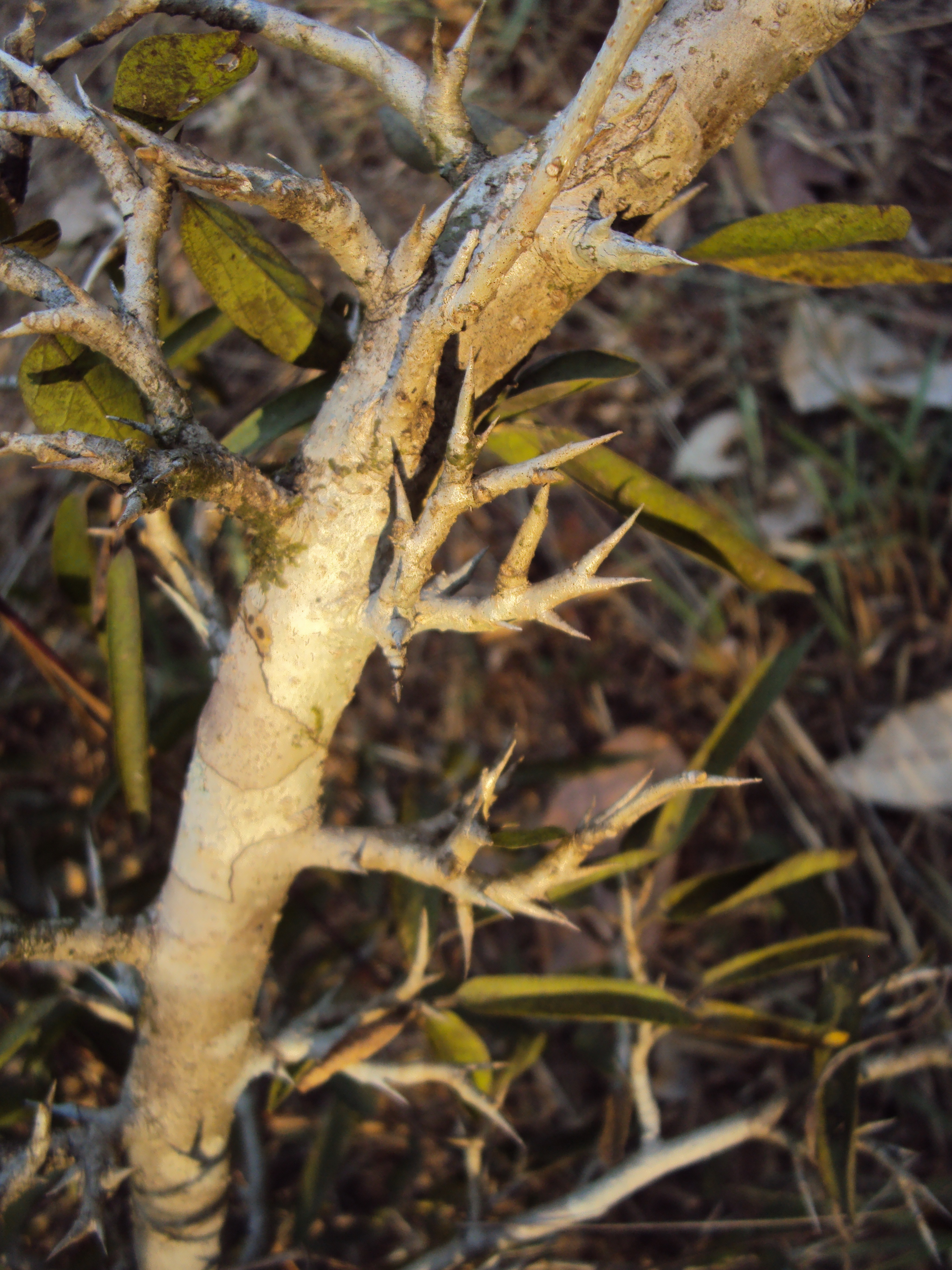
Stunted branches with sharp ends giving impression of a thorn

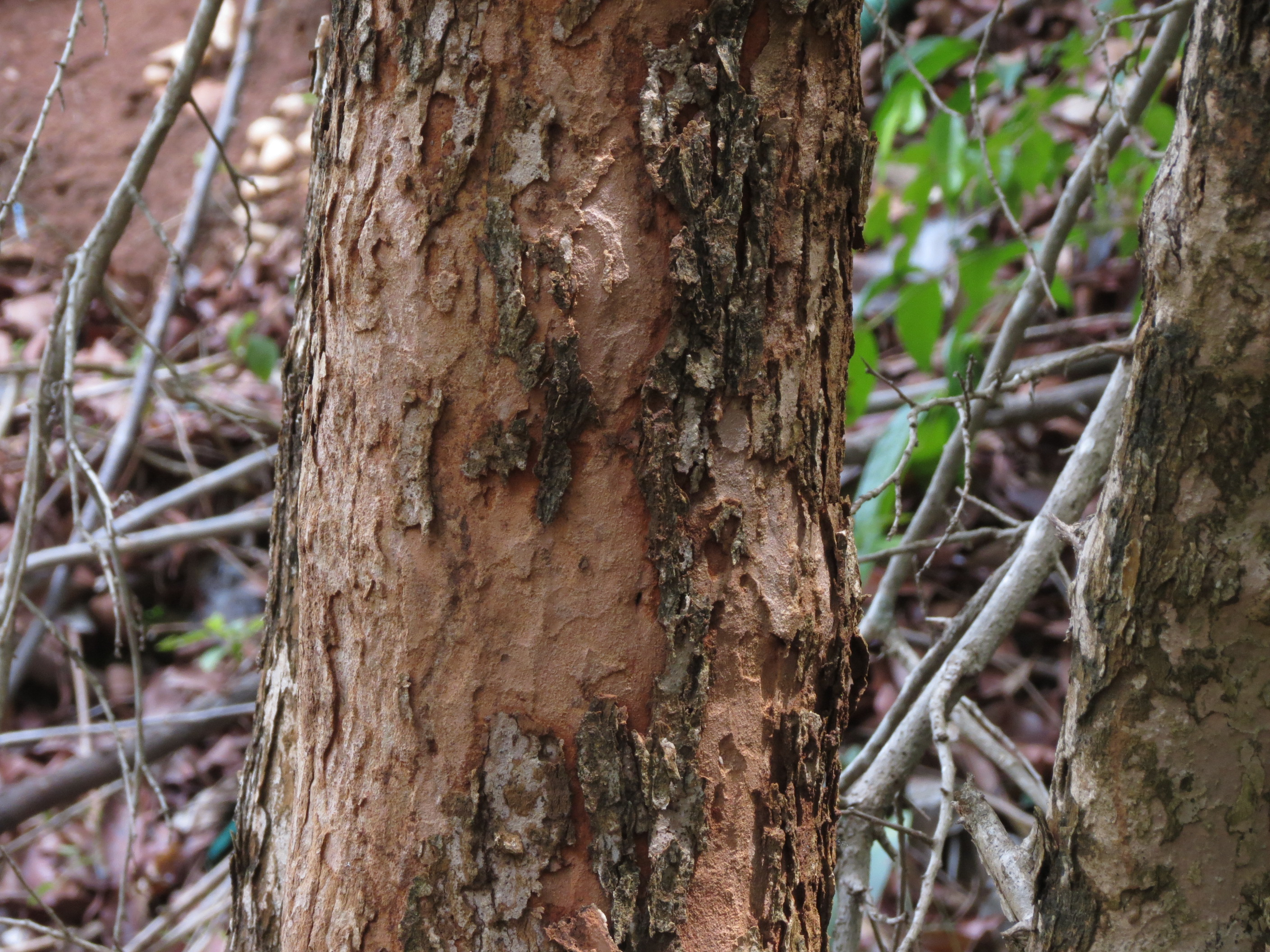
Bark

== Distribution ==
It is native to the Indian subcontinent, the Comoro Islands and eastern tropical Africa. In the Indian sub-continent, it is found in Andhra Pradesh, Bihar, Chhattisgarh, Goa, Gujarat, Karnataka, Kerala, Madhya Pradesh, Maharashtra, Odisha, Rajasthan, Tamil Nadu, Tripura, Uttar Pradesh, Uttarakhand and West Bengal. Other countries and regions which it occurs in are: Bangladesh; Sri Lanka; Nepal; West Himalaya; Comoro Islands; Kenya; and Tanzania.

== Biodiversity and ecology ==
The flowers are bird and bee pollinated. It is mainly pollinated by pale-billed flowerpecker (Dicaeum erythrorhynchos), purple-rumped sunbird (Leptocoma zeylonica), purple sunbird (Cinnyris asiaticus) and two large carpenter bee species, Xylocopa latipes and Xylocopa pubescens.

The birds that feed on the fruits are common myna (Acridotheres tristis), babblers (Turdoides sp) and rose-ringed parakeets (Psittacula krameri).

This is the host plant of the larvae of a rare Western Ghat hawkmoth Daphnis minima

== Uses ==
In Ayurveda the roots and the fruits are used for the treatment of rheumatism and haemorrhoid. Externally, it is used for the treatment of bites by rabbits, rats, and dogs. The root-bark is also used in traditional medicine skin problems and as an antidote for snake bite. The root-bark is also used to expel parasitic worms (Platyhelminthes) and other internal parasites from the body. It is used as an emetic and purgative as well.

The wood is said to be hard and close-grained because of which good finishing is possible. It is used to make ornamental work, pestles and rollers and also is good as a fuel wood. The stems because of its sharp ends are used as a spear in Kenya. The twigs are also used as toothbrush in India. It is considered to be good for making musical instruments and for making furniture as well.

== Gallery ==
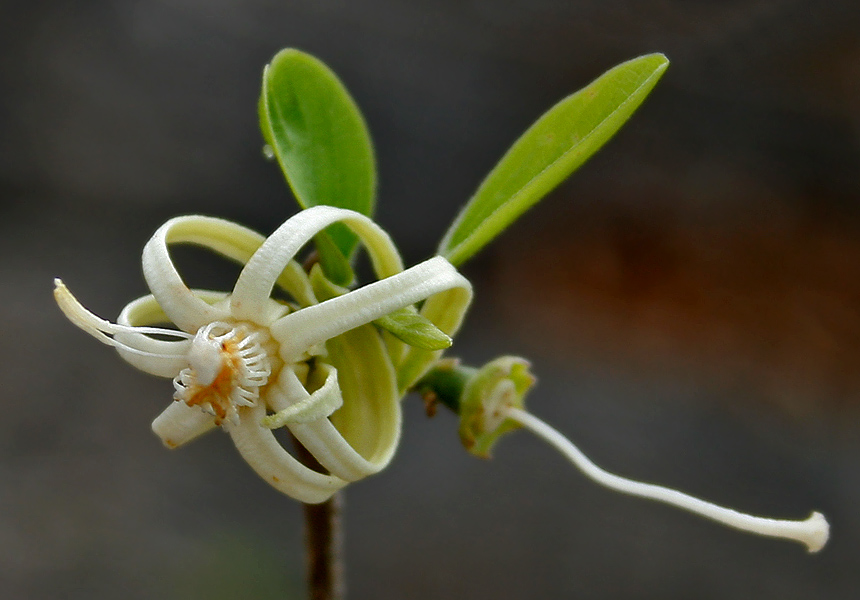

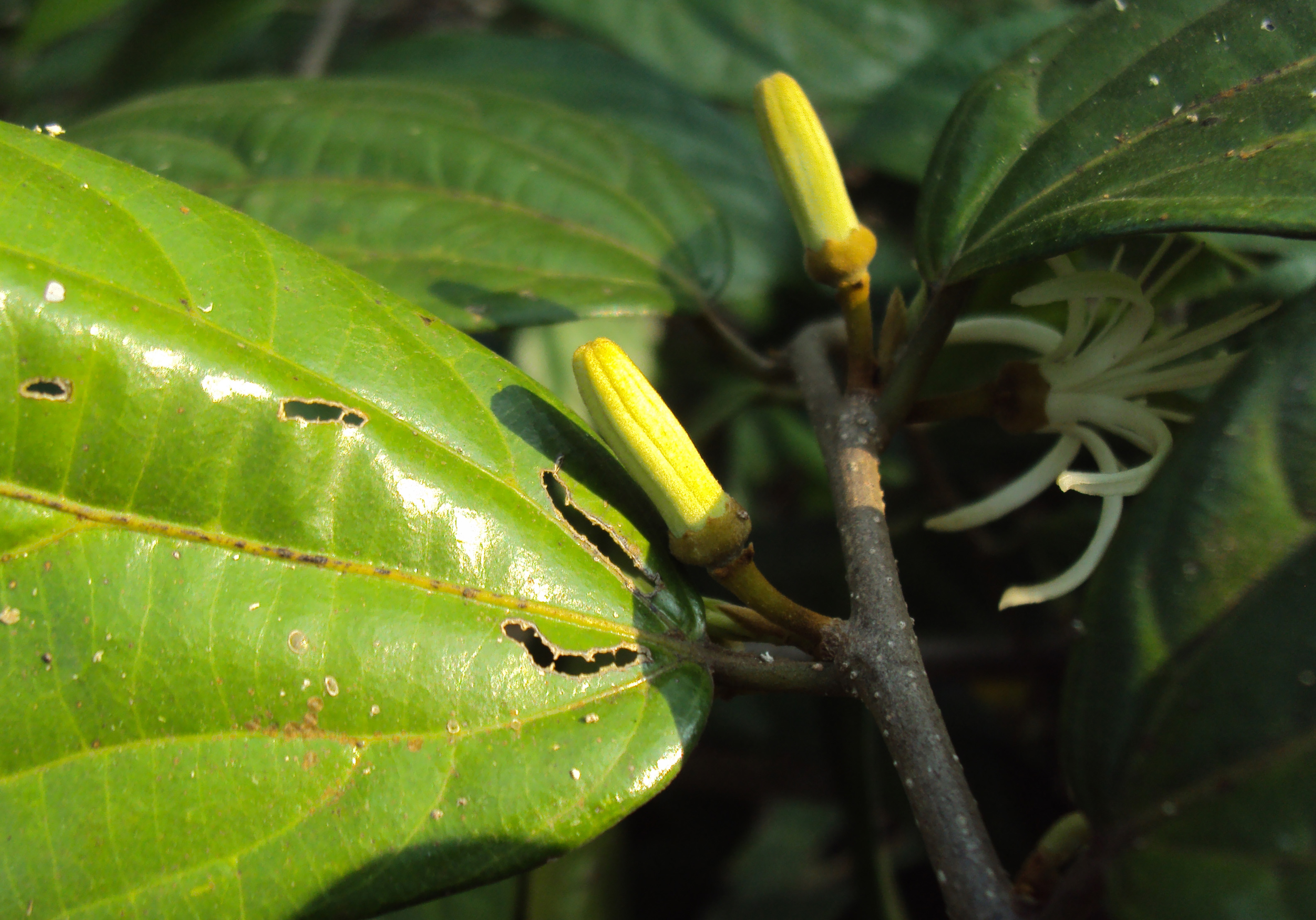

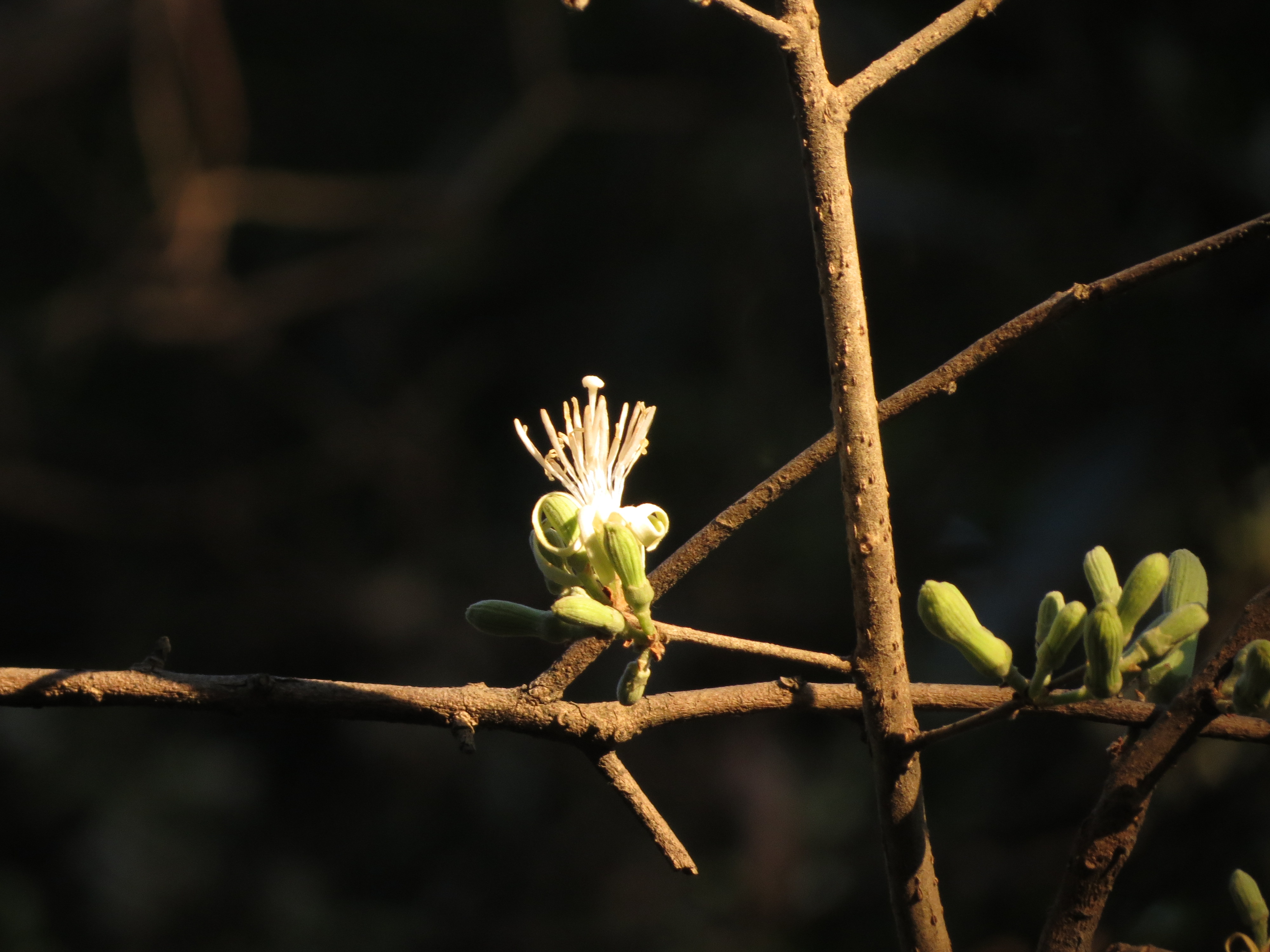

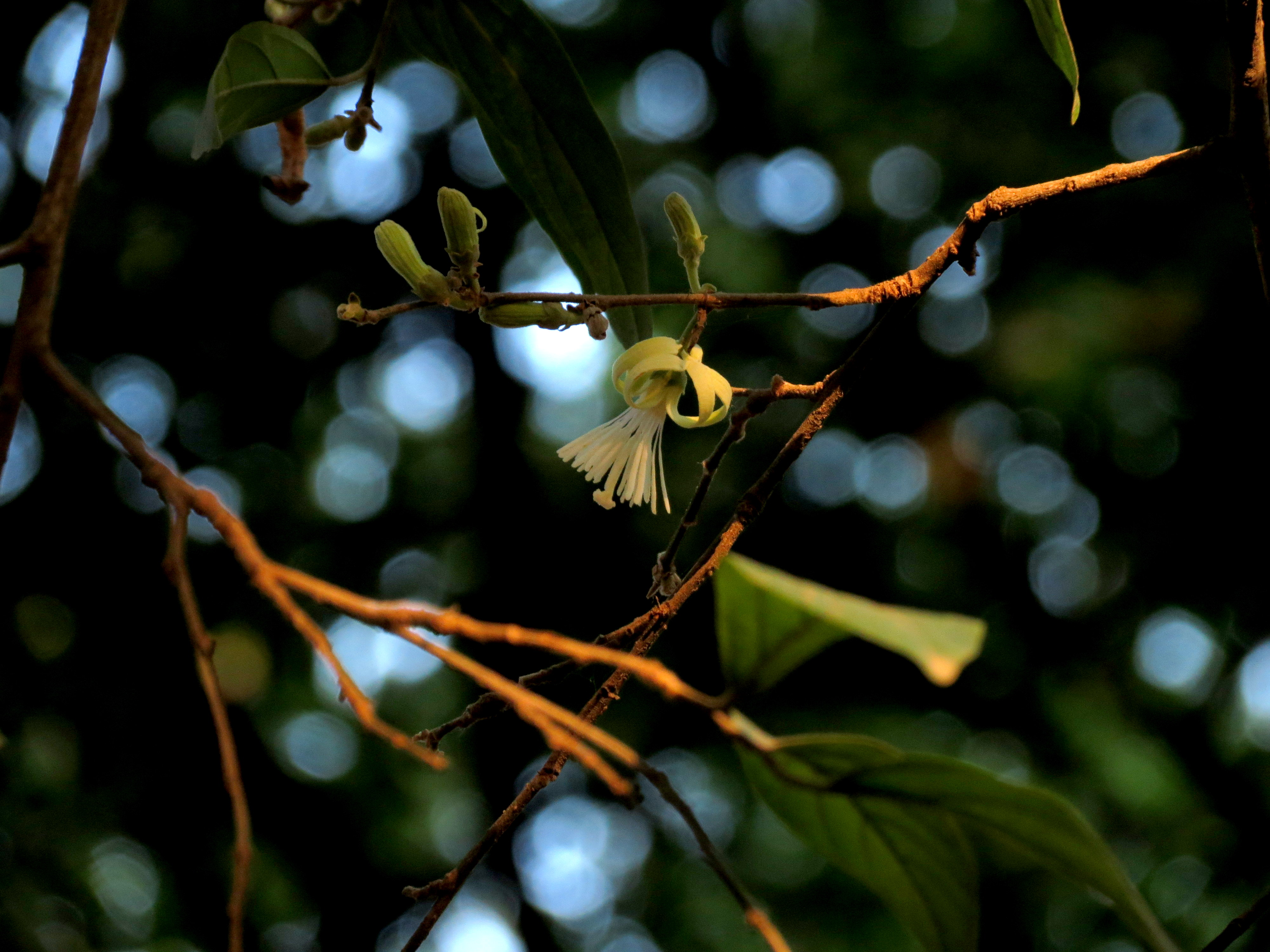

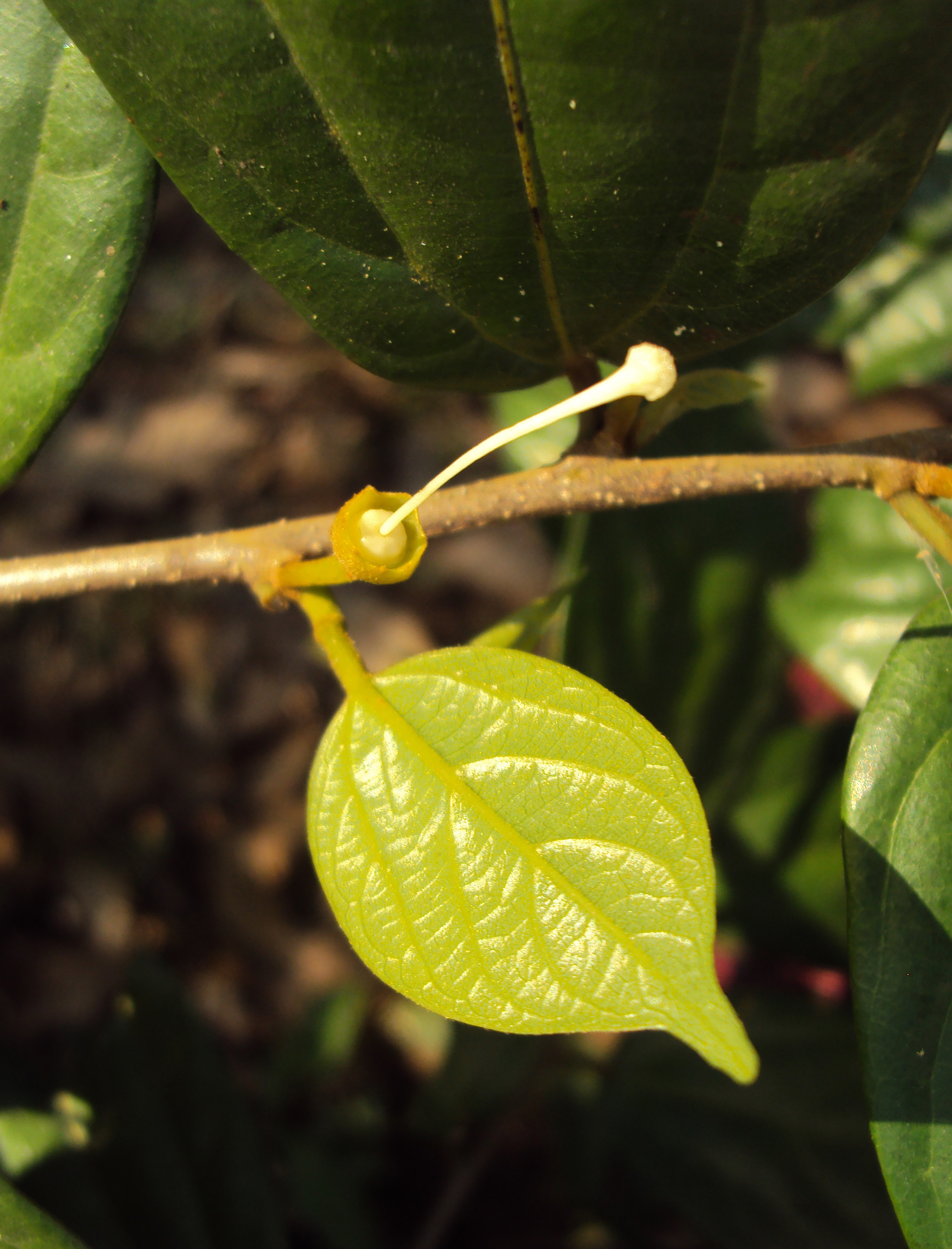

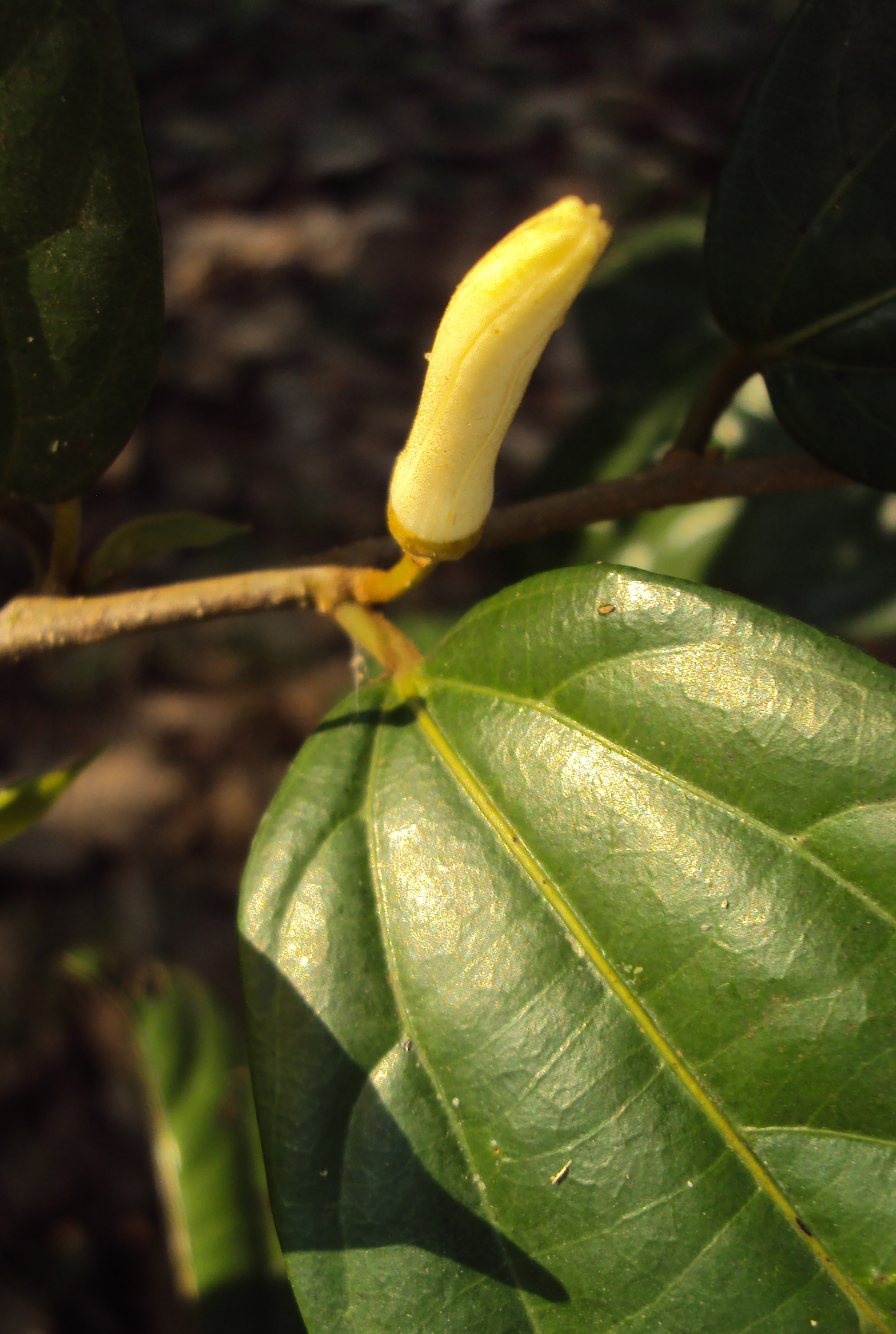

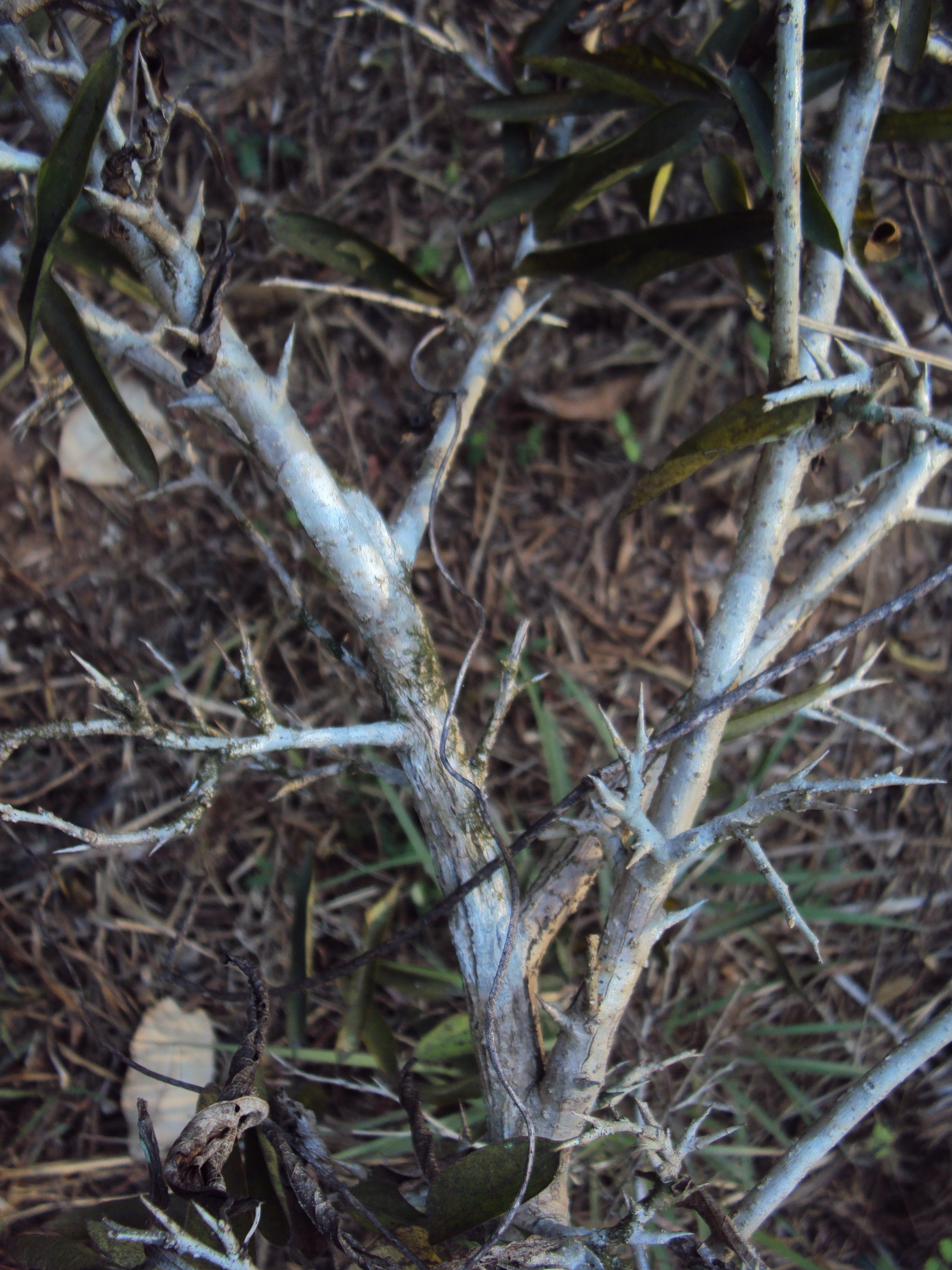

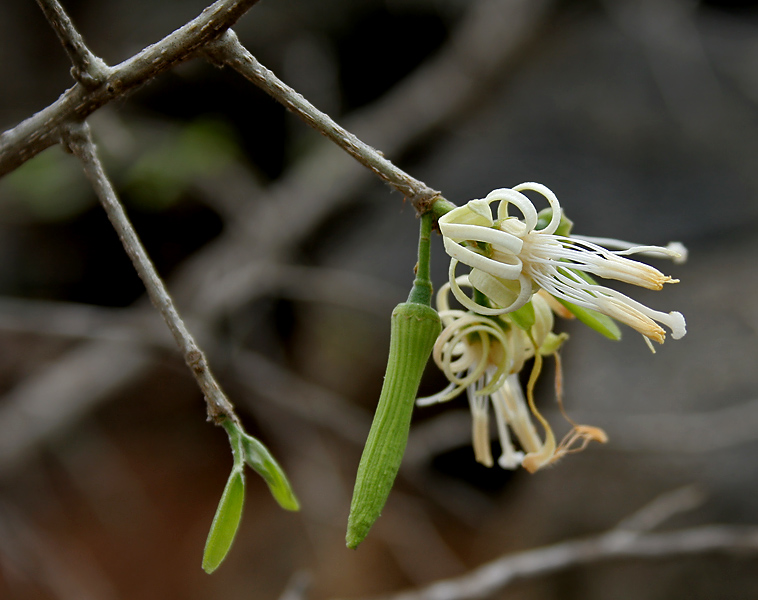

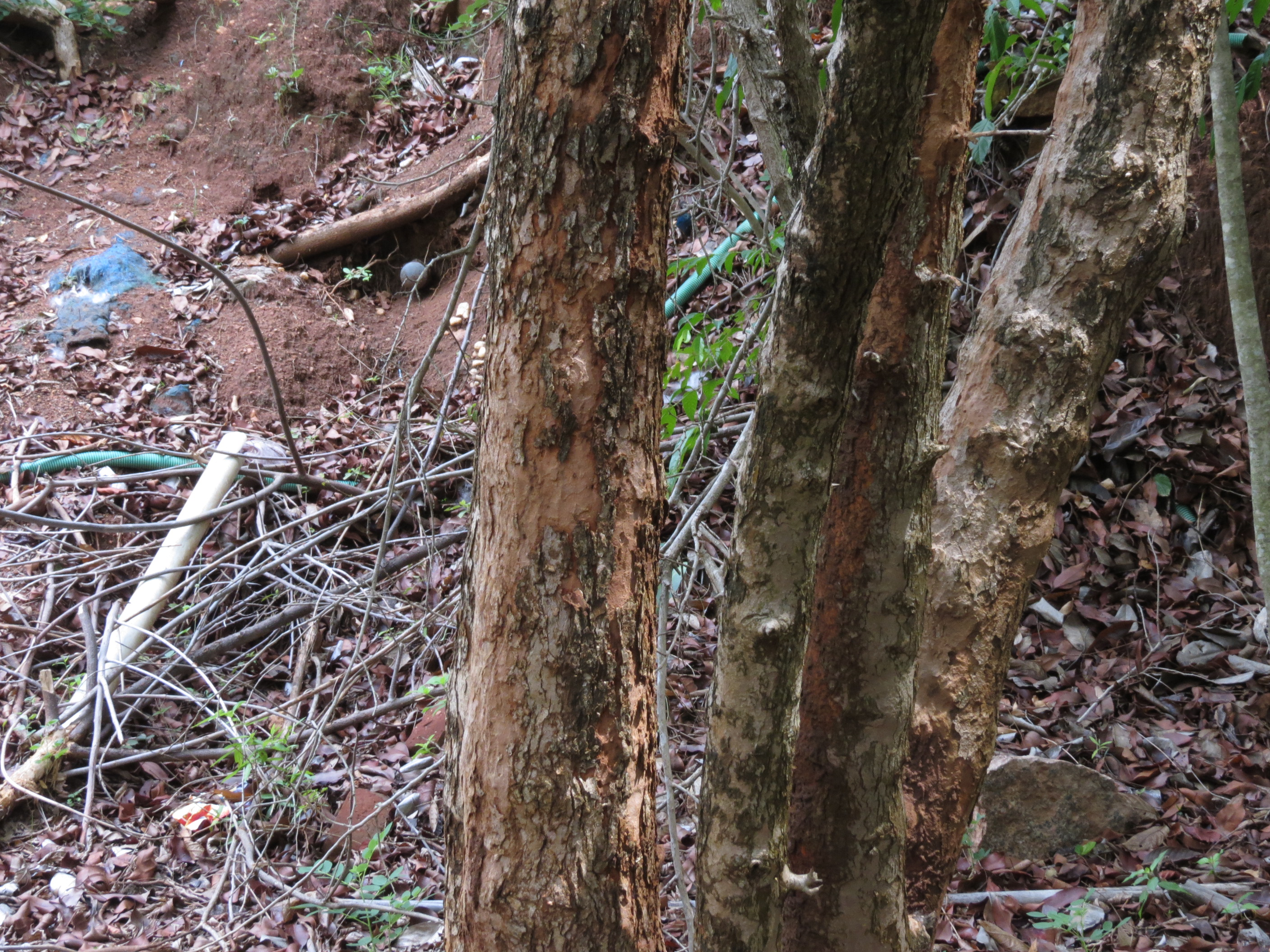

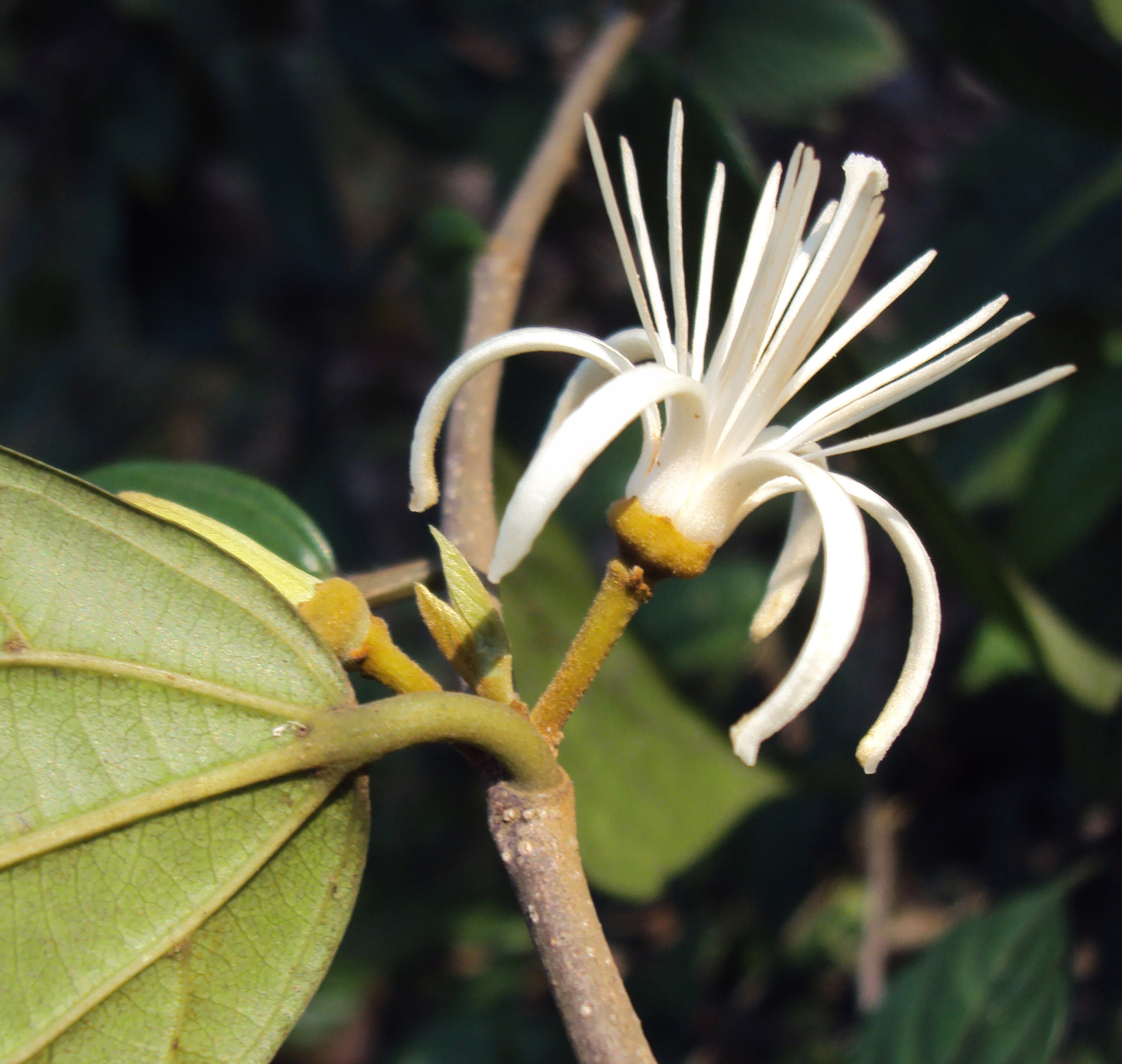

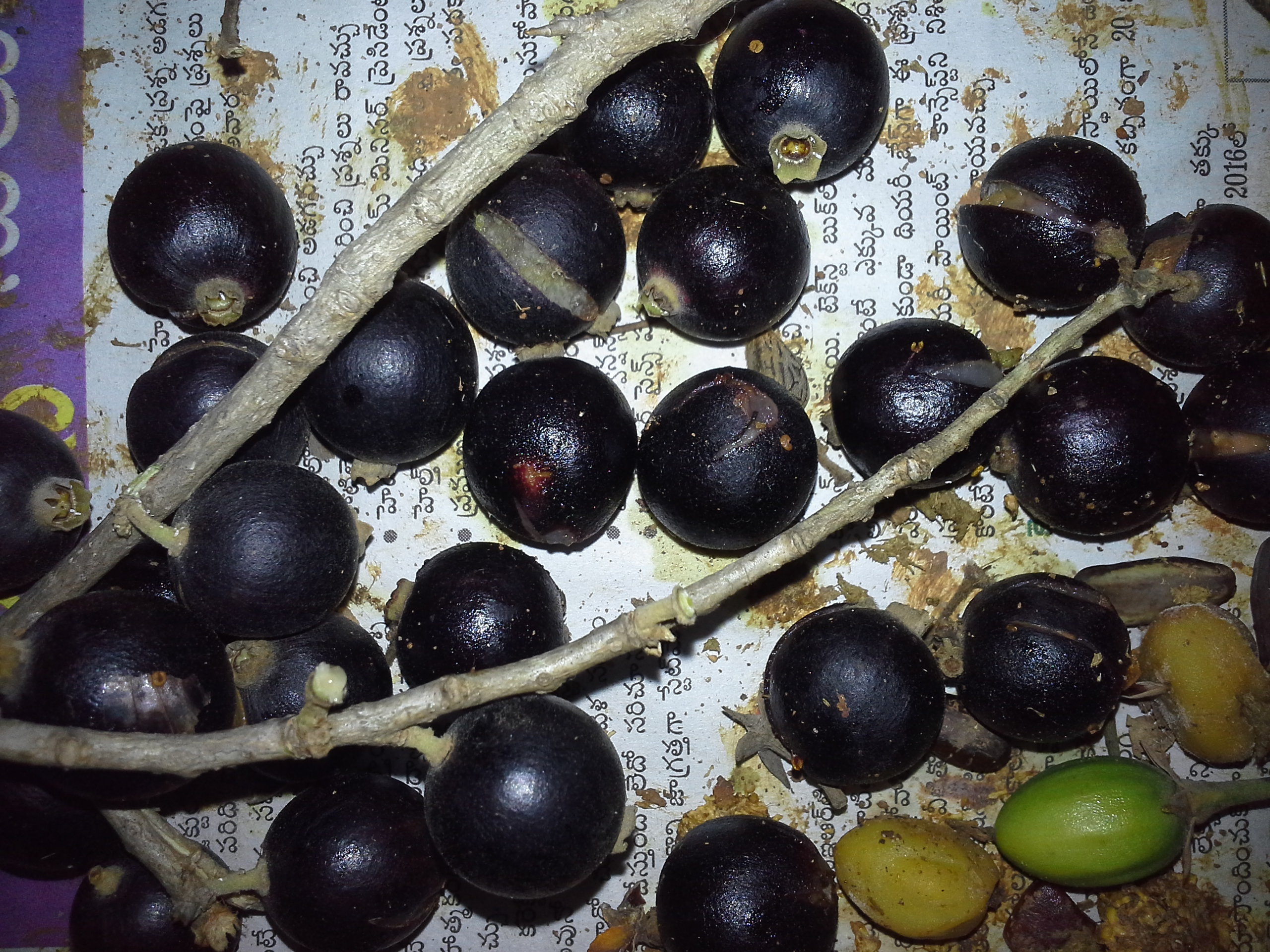
