= Alangium rotundifolium =

Scientific classification
- Kingdom: Plantae
- Clade: Tracheophytes
- Clade: Angiosperms
- Clade: Eudicots
- Clade: Asterids
- Order: Cornales
- Family: Cornaceae
- Genus: Alangium
- Species: A. rotundifolium

Binomial name
- Alangium rotundifolium (Hassk.) Bloemb.

Synonyms
- Alangium begoniifolium var. vulgare Wangerin; Alangium rotundatum Ridl. ex Burkill & M.R.Hend.; Diacicarpium rotundifolium Hassk.; Marlea rotundifolia (Hassk.) Teijsm. & Binn.

Species of tree

Alangium rotundifolium is a tree in the family Cornaceae. The specific epithet rotundifolium is from the Latin meaning 'rounded leaves'.

== Description ==
Alangium rotundifolium grows up to 28 metres (90 ft) tall with a trunk diameter of up to 40 centimetres (16 in). The smooth to scaly bark is white to pale grey. The fragrant flowers are white or cream to yellow. The ovate-ellipsoid fruits are reddish when ripe.

== Distribution and habitat ==
Alangium rotundifolium grows naturally in Sumatra, Peninsular Malaysia, Java and Borneo. Its habitat is forests from 400 metres (1,300 ft) to 1,600 metres (5,000 ft) altitude.
