= Alangium griffithii =

Conservation status
- Least Concern (IUCN 2.3)

Scientific classification
- Kingdom: Plantae
- Clade: Tracheophytes
- Clade: Angiosperms
- Clade: Eudicots
- Clade: Asterids
- Order: Cornales
- Family: Cornaceae
- Genus: Alangium
- Species: A. griffithii

Binomial name
- Alangium griffithii (Clarke) Harms

Species of tree

Alangium griffithii is a species of plant in the Cornaceae family. It is a tree found in Indonesia, Malaysia, Singapore, and Thailand.
