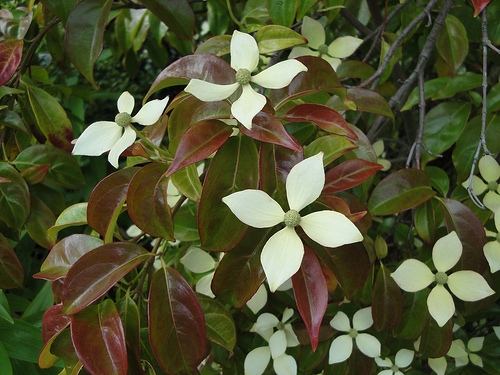

Scientific classification
- Kingdom: Plantae
- Clade: Tracheophytes
- Clade: Angiosperms
- Clade: Eudicots
- Clade: Asterids
- Order: Cornales
- Family: Cornaceae
- Genus: Cornus
- Subgenus: Cornus subg. Syncarpea
- Species: C. elliptica

Binomial name
- Cornus elliptica (Pojarkova) Q. Y. Xiang & Boufford 2005

Synonyms
- Cynoxylon ellipticum Pojarkova, Bot. Mater. Gerb. Bot. Inst. Komarova Akad. Nauk SSSR 12: 188. 1950 ["elliptica"]; Benthamidia capitata (Wallich) H. Hara var. mollis (Rehder) H. Hara; Benthamidia japonica (Siebold & Zuccarini) H. Hara var. angustata (Chun) H. Hara; Cornus angustata (Chun) T. R. Dudley; Cornus capitata subsp. angustata (Chun) Q. Y. Xiang; Cornus capitata var. angustata (Chun) W. P. Fang; C. capitata var. hypoleuca H. Léveillé; Cornus capitata var. mollis Rehder; Cornus kousa F. Buerger ex Hance var. angustata Chun; Dendrobenthamia angustata (Chun) W. P. Fang; Dendrobenthamia angustata var. mollis (Rehder) W. P. Fang; Dendrobenthamia angustata var. wuyishanensis (W. P. Fang & Y. T. Hsieh) W. P. Fang & W. K. Hu; Dendrobenthamia hupehensis W. P. Fang; Dendrobenthamia longipedunculata S. S. Chang & X. Chen; Dendrobenthamia wuyishanica W. P. Fang & Y. T. Hsieh.

= Cornus elliptica =

Species of flowering plant

Cornus elliptica is a species of dogwood found in Fujian, Guangdong, Guangxi, Guizhou, Hubei, Hunan, Jiangxi, Sichuan provinces of China at elevations of 300–2200 meters.
