= Alangium nobile =

Conservation status
- Least Concern (IUCN 2.3)

Scientific classification
- Kingdom: Plantae
- Clade: Tracheophytes
- Clade: Angiosperms
- Clade: Eudicots
- Clade: Asterids
- Order: Cornales
- Family: Cornaceae
- Genus: Alangium
- Species: A. nobile

Binomial name
- Alangium nobile (C.B.Clarke) Harms

Synonyms
- Karangolum nobile (C.B.Clarke) Kuntze; Marlea nobilis C.B.Clarke

Species of tree

Alangium nobile is a tree in the dogwood family Cornaceae. The specific epithet nobile is from the Latin meaning "noble" or "distinguished", likely referring to the growth habit.

== Description ==
Alangium nobile grows as a tree up to 20 metres (70 ft) tall with a trunk diameter of up to 30 cm (12 in). The smooth bark is brown. The ellipsoid to ovoid fruits measure up to 3 cm (1 in) long.

== Distribution and habitat ==
Alangium nobile grows naturally in Sumatra, Peninsular Malaysia and Borneo. Its habitat is forests from sea-level to 1,500 m (5,000 ft) altitude.
