= Alangium longiflorum =

Conservation status
- Vulnerable (IUCN 2.3)

Scientific classification
- Kingdom: Plantae
- Clade: Tracheophytes
- Clade: Angiosperms
- Clade: Eudicots
- Clade: Asterids
- Order: Cornales
- Family: Cornaceae
- Genus: Alangium
- Species: A. longiflorum

Binomial name
- Alangium longiflorum Merr.

Synonyms
- Alangium hirsutum Bloemb.; Alangium longifolium Merr.

Species of tree

Alangium longiflorum is a tree in the dogwood family Cornaceae. The specific epithet longiflorum is from the Latin meaning "long flowers".

== Description ==
Alangium longiflorum grows as a tree up to 20 metres (70 ft) tall with a trunk diameter of up to 25 cm (10 in). The smooth bark is dark brown. The flowers are white. The ellipsoid to ovoid fruits ripen pinkish and measure up to 25 cm (10 in) long.

== Distribution and habitat ==
Alangium longiflorum grows naturally in Borneo and the Philippines. Its habitat is forests from sea-level to 1,200 m (4,000 ft) altitude.
