= Alangium havilandii =

Conservation status
- Vulnerable (IUCN 2.3)

Scientific classification
- Kingdom: Plantae
- Clade: Tracheophytes
- Clade: Angiosperms
- Clade: Eudicots
- Clade: Asterids
- Order: Cornales
- Family: Cornaceae
- Genus: Alangium
- Species: A. havilandii

Binomial name
- Alangium havilandii Bloemb.

Species of tree

Alangium havilandii is a tree in the dogwood family Cornaceae. It is named for the British surgeon and naturalist George Darby Haviland.

== Description ==
Alangium havilandii grows as a tree up to 25 metres (80 ft) tall with a trunk diameter of up to 30 cm (12 in). Its bark is smooth and greyish. The ellipsoid-ovoid fruits ripen pink and measure up to 1.8 cm (1 in) long.

== Distribution and habitat ==
Alangium havilandii is endemic to Borneo. Its habitat is lowland peat swamp forest.
