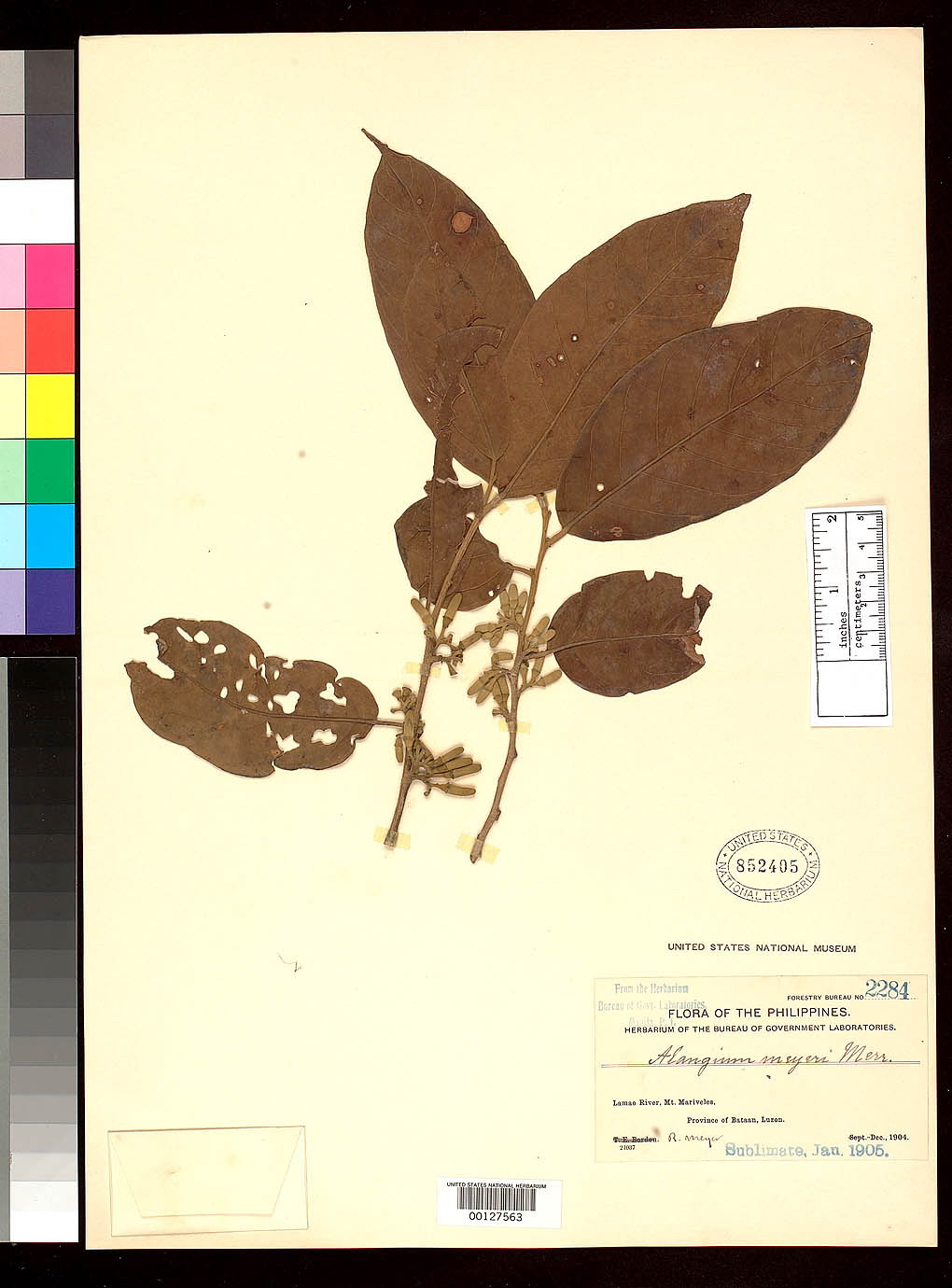

Conservation status
- Least Concern (IUCN 2.3)

Scientific classification
- Kingdom: Plantae
- Clade: Tracheophytes
- Clade: Angiosperms
- Clade: Eudicots
- Clade: Asterids
- Order: Cornales
- Family: Cornaceae
- Genus: Alangium
- Species: A. javanicum

Binomial name
- Alangium javanicum (Bl.) Wang

= Alangium javanicum =

Species of flowering plant

Alangium javanicum is a species of plant in the Cornaceae family. It is found in Brunei, Indonesia, Malaysia, Singapore, and the Philippines.
