= Alangium circulare =

Conservation status
- Critically endangered, possibly extinct in the wild (IUCN 3.1)

Scientific classification
- Kingdom: Plantae
- Clade: Tracheophytes
- Clade: Angiosperms
- Clade: Eudicots
- Clade: Asterids
- Order: Cornales
- Family: Cornaceae
- Genus: Alangium
- Species: A. circulare

Binomial name
- Alangium circulare B.C.Stone & Kochummen

Species of tree

Alangium circulare is a tree in the dogwood family Cornaceae. The specific epithet circulare is from the Latin meaning "circular", referring to shape of the leaves.

== Description ==
Alangium circulare grows as a tree up to 15 metres (50 ft) tall. The smooth bark is grey-brown. The inflorescence is greyish pubescent.

== Distribution and habitat ==
Alangium circulare is endemic to Borneo where it is confined to Sarawak. Its habitat is kerangas forest.
