= Nasa aequatoriana =

Conservation status
- Endangered (IUCN 3.1)

Scientific classification
- Kingdom: Plantae
- Clade: Tracheophytes
- Clade: Angiosperms
- Clade: Eudicots
- Clade: Asterids
- Order: Cornales
- Family: Loasaceae
- Genus: Nasa
- Species: N. aequatoriana

Binomial name
- Nasa aequatoriana (Urb. & Gilg) Weigend

Synonyms
- Loasa aequatoriana (Urb. & Gilg) Weigend; Loasa triphylla var. aequatoriana Urb. & Gilg

Species of flowering plant

Nasa aequatoriana is a species of flowering plant in the family Loasaceae. It is endemic to Ecuador. Its natural habitat is subtropical or tropical moist montane forests.
