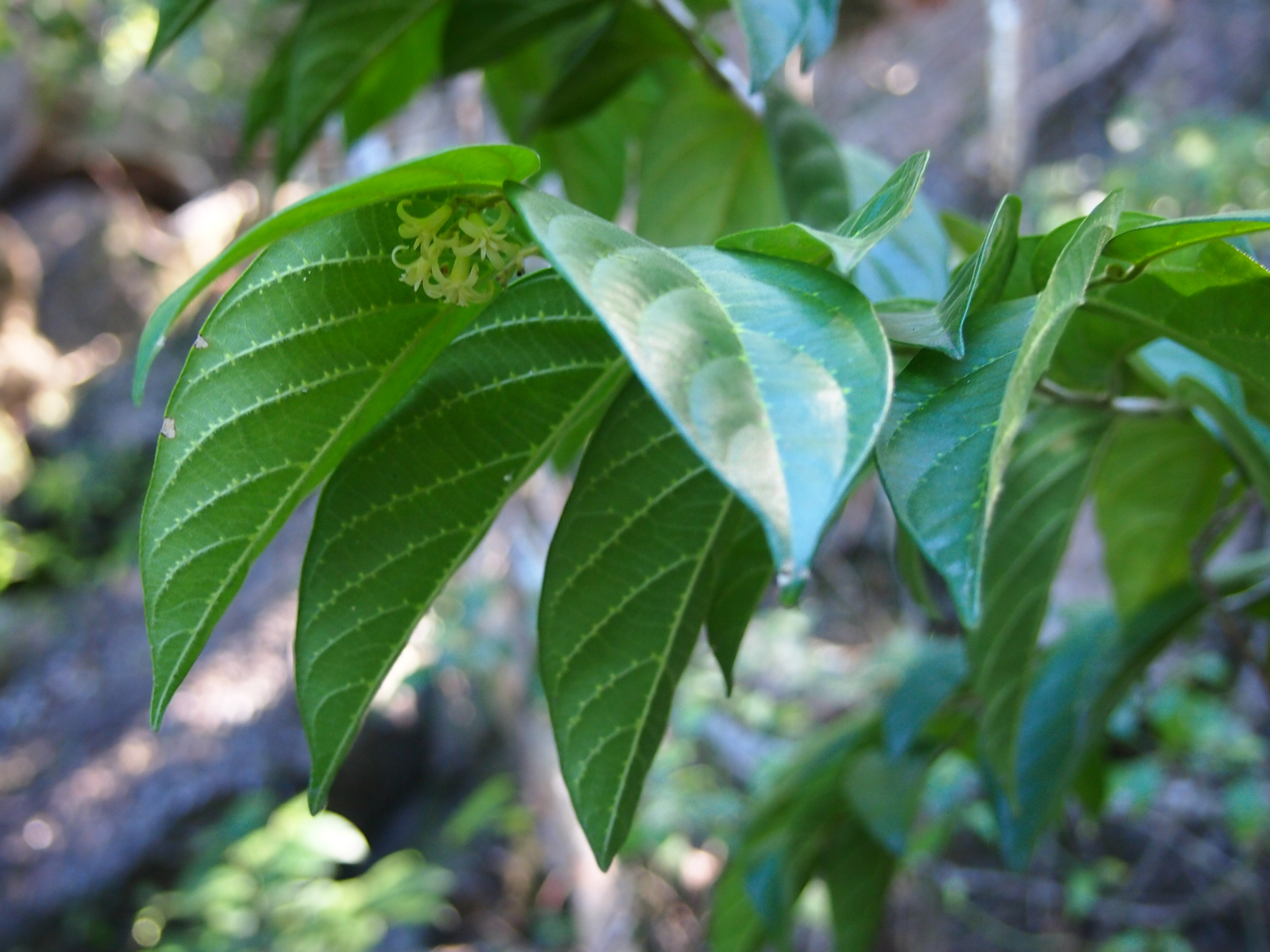
- Flowers and foliage

Scientific classification
- Kingdom: Plantae
- Clade: Embryophytes
- Clade: Tracheophytes
- Clade: Spermatophytes
- Clade: Angiosperms
- Clade: Eudicots
- Clade: Asterids
- Order: Cornales
- Family: Cornaceae
- Genus: Alangium
- Species: A. polyosmoides

Binomial name
- Alangium polyosmoides (F.Muell.) W.J.de Wilde & Duyfjes

Synonyms
- Alangium villosum var. australe Bloemb.; Alangium villosum subsp. polyosmoides (F.Muell.) Bloemb.; Alangium villosum subsp. tomentosum (F.Muell.) Bloemb.; Alangium villosum var. tomentosum (F.Muell.) Bloemb.; Alangium vitiense var. tomentosum (Benth.) Wangerin; Marlea vitiensis var. tomentosa Benth.; Pseudalangium polyosmoides F.Muell.; Pseudalangium polyosmoides var. tomentosum F.Muell.; Rhytidandra polyosmoides (F.Muell.) F.Muell.

= Alangium polyosmoides =

Species of plant

Alangium polyosmoides is a rainforest tree of eastern Australia. It occurs on a variety of different soils, generally close to the coast. Found from Minmi near Newcastle to as far north as the McIlwraith Range in far northeastern Queensland. It may be seen as a common understorey plant at Wingham Brush Nature Reserve.

Common names include muskwood, black muskheart, brown muskheart and canary muskheart. The generic name is from the Malabar people, being their name of the related Asian species, Alangium decapetalum. The specific epithet refers to the similarity of the leaves in the genus Polyosma.

== Description ==
A small to occasionally mid-sized tree up to 20 m (66 ft) in height with a trunk diameter of 90 cm (35 in). The trunk in larger trees may be buttressed. The bark is marked by lenticels, scales and corky bumps and irregularities, mostly greyish brown in colour. Small branches are thin and grey, though hairy and green towards the tips. The twig between the leaves is not particularly hairy.

Mature leaves are from 4 to 15 cm (1.4–6 in) long and 2 to 4 cm (0.8-1.6 in) wide, though juveniles may be larger. They alternate on the stem with a fairly long point. The leaves are oblong-ovate or oblong-elliptical in shape and unequal at the leaf base. A midrib, lateral veins and net veins are evident from below the leaf, as are numerous yellow bumps along the lateral veins and midrib. This makes identification of this plant very clear, when in the rainforest. The leaf stem is 6 to 13 mm long.

=== Flowers and fruit ===
Pale yellow flowers form on cymes from the leaf axils, with three to five flowers per cyme. The flowers have a honeysuckle scent. The cyme is less than 2 cm long, appearing from October to April. There are 4 to 6 petals per flower, 2 mm wide and around 5 mm long.

The fruit is a dark drupe, black or almost black, ribbed and oval, and 10 to 20 mm long. Fruit ripens from September to February and is eaten by rainforest birds, including the rose-crowned fruit-dove, topknot pigeon and wompoo fruit-dove. Inside the fruit is an elliptic, pointed seed, 10 mm long.
