= A. chinense =

A. chinense may refer to:

- Allium chinense, the Chinese onion, Chinese scallion, Japanese scallion or Oriental onion, an edible species of wild onion found in Asia
- Alangium chinense, a flowering plant species
