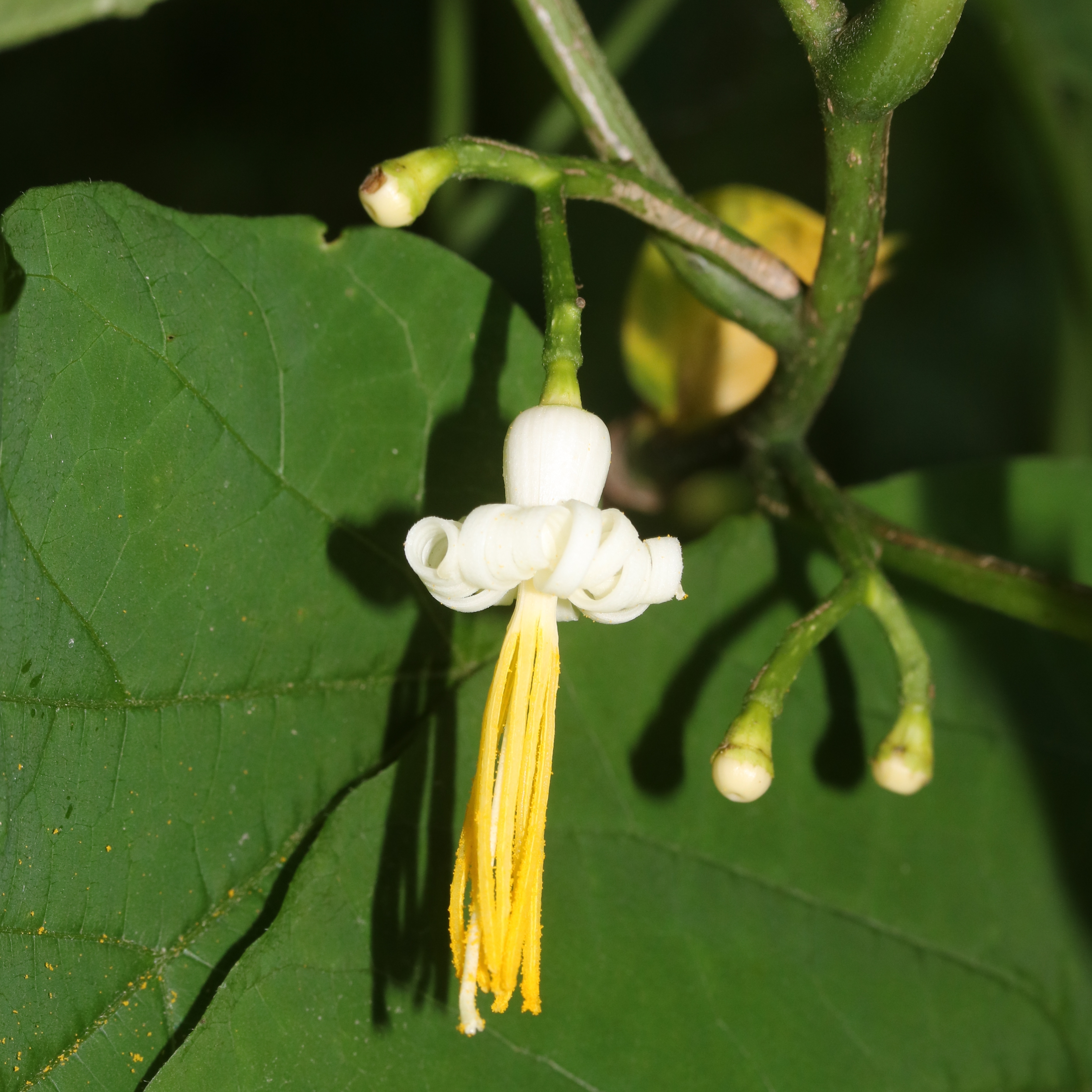

Scientific classification
- Kingdom: Plantae
- Clade: Tracheophytes
- Clade: Angiosperms
- Clade: Eudicots
- Clade: Asterids
- Order: Cornales
- Family: Cornaceae
- Genus: Alangium
- Species: A. platanifolium

Binomial name
- Alangium platanifolium (Siebold & Zucc.) Harms

Synonyms
- Alangium platanifolium var. genuinum Wangerin 1910; Karangolum platanifolium (Siebold & Zucc.) Kuntze 1891; Marlea platanifolia Siebold & Zucc. 1845; Alangium macrophyllum (Siebold & Zucc.) Harms 1898; Alangium platanifolium f. cordatum Wangerin 1910; Alangium platanifolium f. macrophyllum (Siebold & Zucc.) H.Ohashi & K.Ohashi 2009; Alangium platanifolium var. macrophyllum (Siebold & Zucc.) Pamp. 1910; Alangium platanifolium var. ogurae Yanagita 1936; Alangium platanifolium var. trilobatum Miq. & Ohwi 1965; Alangium platanifolium var. trilobum (Miq.) Ohwi 1965; Alangium platanifolium f. velutinum (Nakai) T.B.Lee 1966; Alangium sinicum (Nakai) S.Y.Hu, Spongberg & Z.Cheng 1983; Marlea macrophylla Siebold & Zucc. 1845; Marlea macrophylla var. triloba (Miq.) Nakai 1928; Marlea macrophylla var. velutina Nakai 1928; Marlea platanifolia var. macrophylla (Siebold & Zucc.) Makino 1906; Marlea platanifolia var. triloba Miq.1866; Marlea platanifolia f. velutina (Nakai) H.Hara 1954; Marlea sinica Nakai 1928

= Alangium platanifolium =

Species of plant

Alangium platanifolium is a species of Alangium found in China, Japan, and Taiwan at elevations below 2000 meters.
