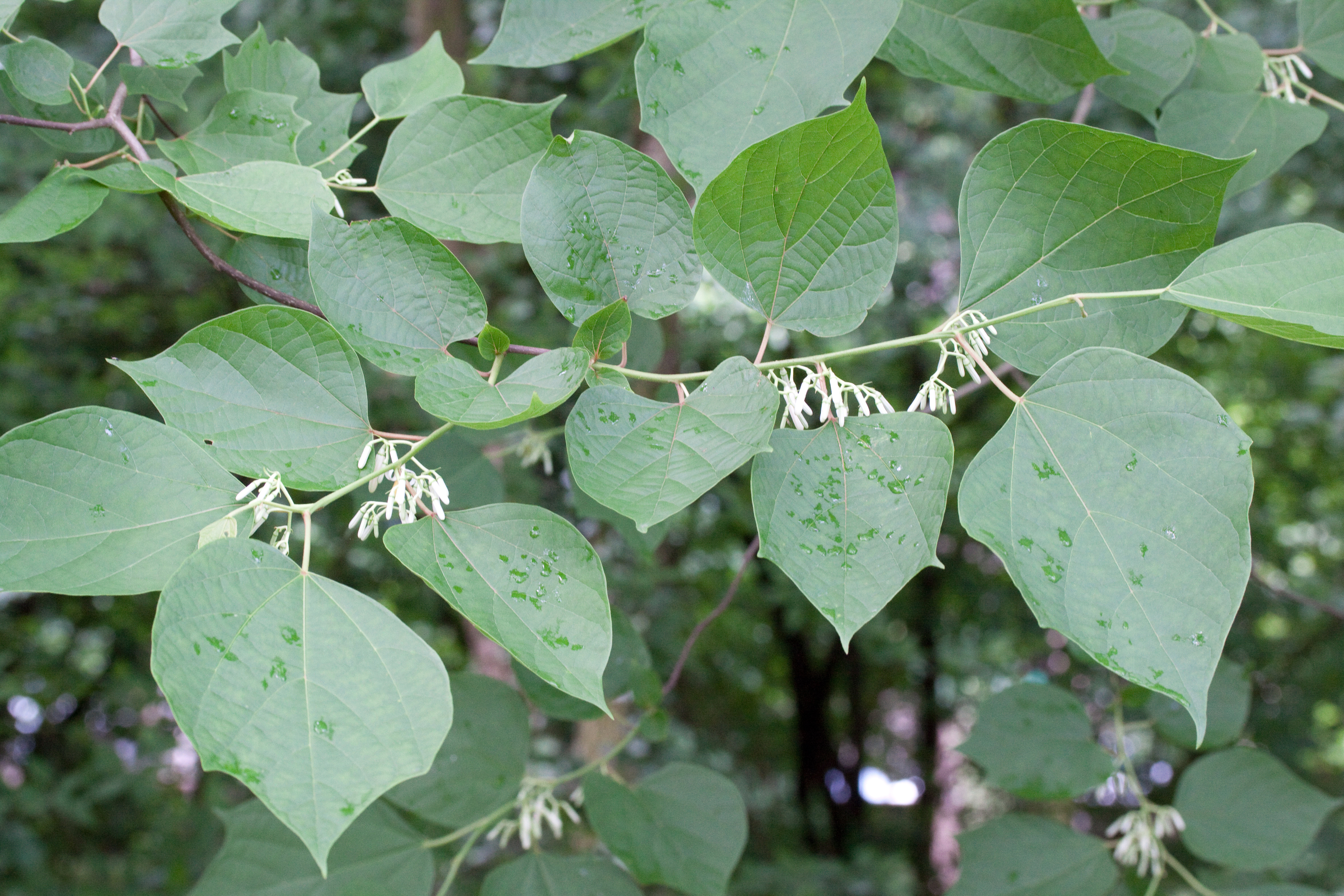

Conservation status
- Least Concern (IUCN 3.1)

Scientific classification
- Kingdom: Plantae
- Clade: Tracheophytes
- Clade: Angiosperms
- Clade: Eudicots
- Clade: Asterids
- Order: Cornales
- Family: Cornaceae
- Genus: Alangium
- Species: A. chinense

Binomial name
- Alangium chinense (Lour.) Harms

Synonyms
- List: Alangium chinense var. vulgare Merr.; Karangolum chinense (Lour.) Kuntze; Marlea chinensis (Lour.) Druce; Stylidium chinense Lour.; Stylis chinensis (Lour.) Poir.; Alangium begoniifolium (Roxb.) Baill.; Alangium begoniifolium subsp. eubegoniifolium Wangerin; Alangium chinense subsp. pauciflorum W.P.Fang; Alangium chinense var. pauciflorum W.P.Fang ex Y.C.Ho; Alangium chinense subsp. strigosum W.P.Fang; Alangium chinense var. taiwanianum (Masam.) Koidz.; Alangium chinense subsp. triangulare (Wangerin) W.P.Fang; Alangium cordifolium Zoll. & Moritzi; Alangium kenyense Chiov.; Alangium octopetalum Hanes ex Blanco; Alangium platanifolium f. triangulare Wangerin; Alangium taiwanianum Masam.; Marlea affinis Decne.; Marlea begoniifolia Roxb.; Marlea virgata Zoll.; Stelanthes solitarius Stokes; Stylidium bauthas Lour. ex B.A.Gomes; Guettarda jasminiflora Blanco; Stylidium begoniifolium (Roxb.) Voigt; Styrax rossamalus Reinw. ex Steud.

= Alangium chinense =

Species of flowering plant

Alangium chinense is a species of flowering plant in the family Cornaceae. It has the Chinese name (Chinese: 八角枫; pinyin: bā jiǎo fēng).

== Traditional uses ==
It is one of the 50 fundamental herbs used in traditional Chinese medicine. In Hunan herbal medicine it is used for snake bites, circulation, contraception, hemostasis, numbness, poison, rheumatism, and wounds.

== Other uses ==
Oil extracted from the seed of the plant can be used to light lamps.

== Distribution ==
It is native to Angola, Assam, Bangladesh, Burundi, Cabinda, Cambodia, Cameroon, China, the Democratic Republic of the Congo, Ethiopia, Gulf of Guinea islands, Himalaya, India, Java, Kenya, Laos, the Lesser Sunda Islands, Malawi, Mozambique, Nepal, the Philippines, Rwanda, South Sudan, Sudan, Taiwan, Tanzania, Thailand, Tibet, Uganda, Vietnam, Zambia, and Zimbabwe.

== See also ==
- Chinese herbology
