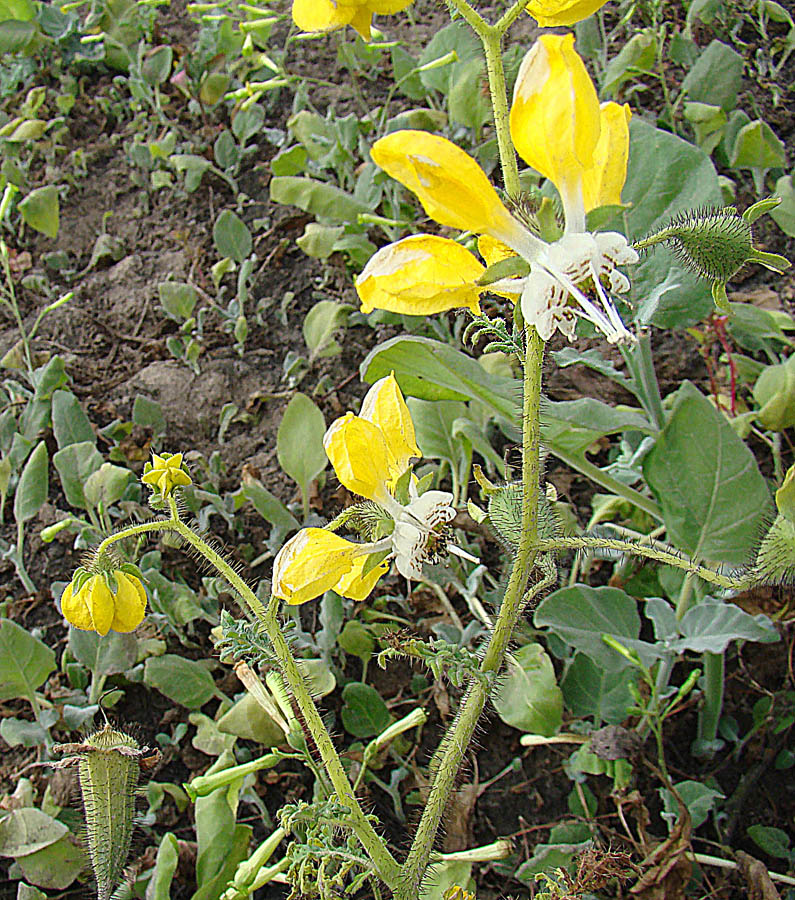
- Nasa urens

Scientific classification
- Kingdom: Plantae
- Clade: Tracheophytes
- Clade: Angiosperms
- Clade: Eudicots
- Clade: Asterids
- Order: Cornales
- Family: Loasaceae
- Genus: Nasa; Weigend

Species
- See text

= Nasa (plant) =

Genus of flowering plants

Nasa is a genus of plants in the family Loasaceae. It contains over 100 known species, all of which are found in South America with the exception of two species endemic to Central America. They are common in submontane to montane environments.

Species include:

- Nasa aequatoriana
- Nasa amaluzensis
- Nasa asplundii
- Nasa auca
- Nasa connectans
- Nasa ferox
- Nasa grandiflora
- Nasa glabra
- Nasa hornii
- Nasa humboldtiana
- Nasa jungifolia
- Nasa katjae
- Nasa loxensis
- Nasa modesta
- Nasa panamensis
- Nasa peltata
- Nasa profundilobata
- Nasa rufipila
- Nasa speciosa
- Nasa tabularis
