= Nasa hornii =

Conservation status
- Vulnerable (IUCN 3.1)

Scientific classification
- Kingdom: Plantae
- Clade: Tracheophytes
- Clade: Angiosperms
- Clade: Eudicots
- Clade: Asterids
- Order: Cornales
- Family: Loasaceae
- Genus: Nasa
- Species: N. hornii

Binomial name
- Nasa hornii (Weigend) Weigend

Species of flowering plant

Nasa hornii is a species of plant in the Loasaceae family. It is endemic to Ecuador. Its natural habitat is subtropical or tropical moist montane forests.
