= Nasa peltata =

Conservation status
- Endangered (IUCN 3.1)

Scientific classification
- Kingdom: Plantae
- Clade: Tracheophytes
- Clade: Angiosperms
- Clade: Eudicots
- Clade: Asterids
- Order: Cornales
- Family: Loasaceae
- Genus: Nasa
- Species: N. peltata

Binomial name
- Nasa peltata (Urb. & Gilg) Weigend

Synonyms
- Loasa peltata Spruce ex Urb. & Gilg; Loasa alpina Urb. & Gilg

Species of flowering plant

Nasa peltata is a species of plant in the Loasaceae family. It is endemic to Ecuador. Its natural habitats are subtropical or tropical moist montane forests and subtropical or tropical dry shrubland.
