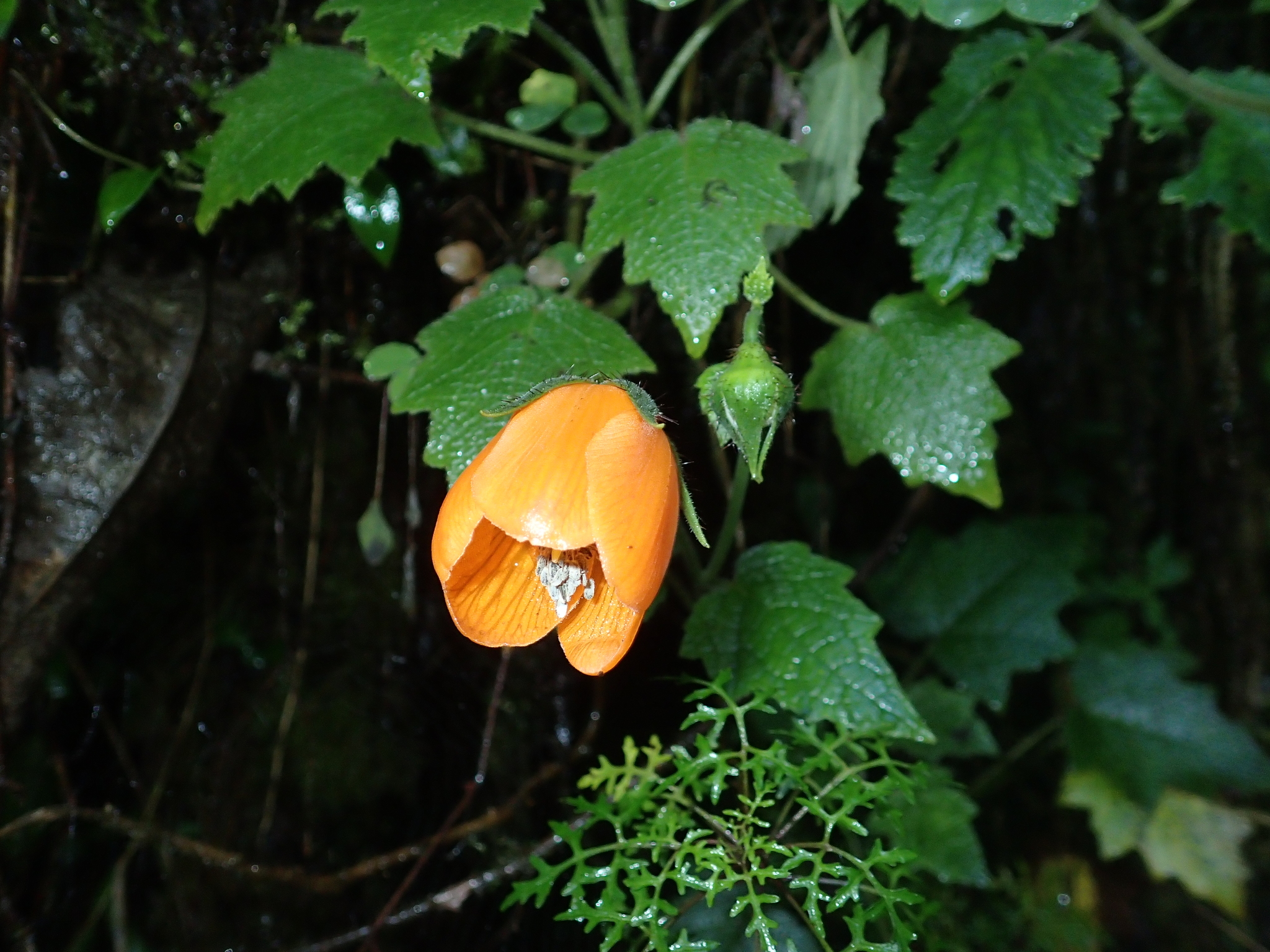

Scientific classification
- Kingdom: Plantae
- Clade: Tracheophytes
- Clade: Angiosperms
- Clade: Eudicots
- Clade: Asterids
- Order: Cornales
- Family: Loasaceae
- Genus: Nasa
- Species: N. grandiflora

Binomial name
- Nasa grandiflora (Desr.) Weigend

= Nasa grandiflora =

Species of plant

Nasa grandiflora is a species of plant in the family Loasaceae. It is endemic to the mountains of Peru, Ecuador, and Colombia.

== Range ==
Endemic to the Andes Mountains of Peru, Ecuador, and Columbia between 3,100 and 3,500 masl.
