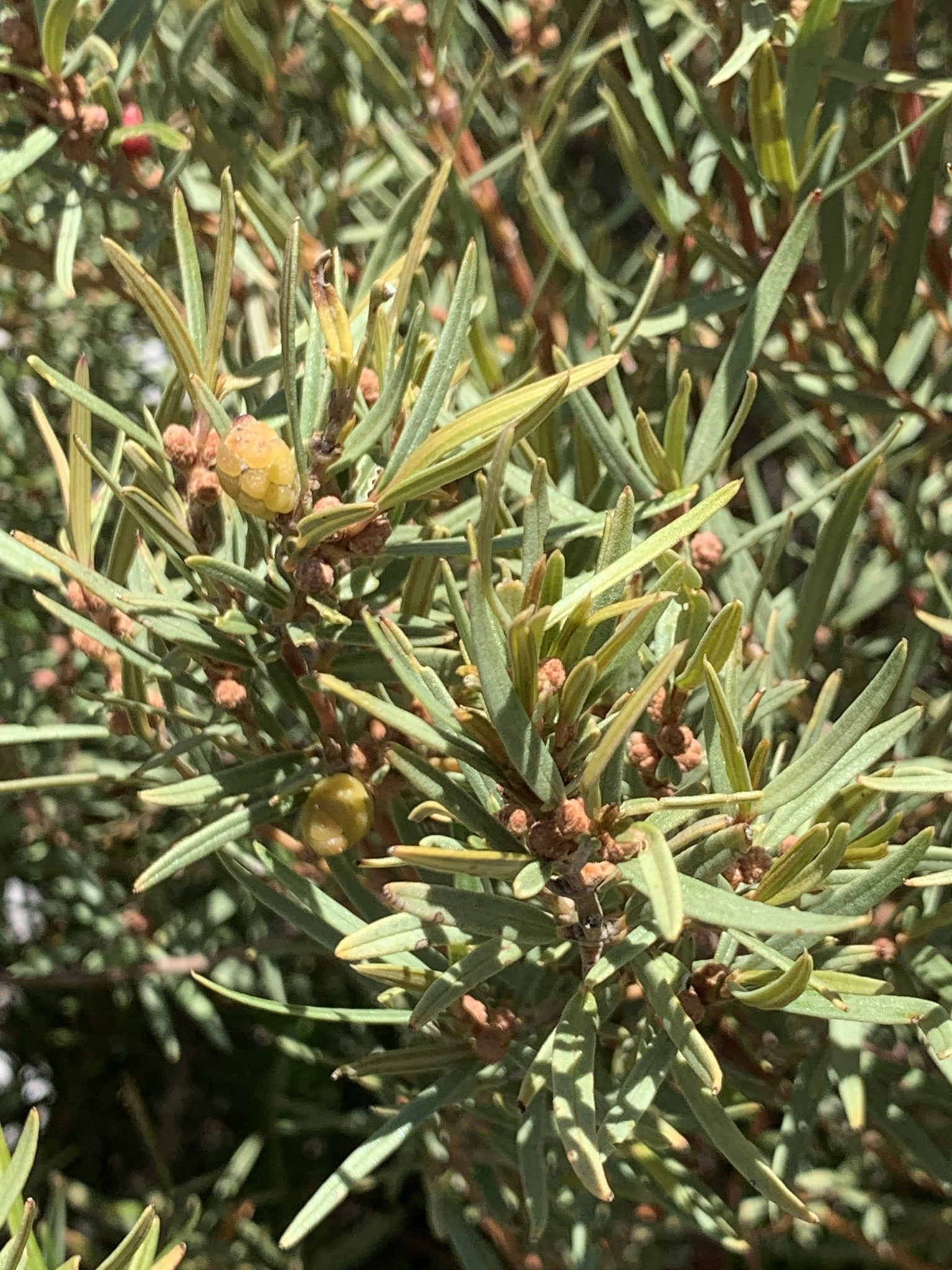
- Grubbia tomentosa

Scientific classification
- Kingdom: Plantae
- Clade: Tracheophytes
- Clade: Angiosperms
- Clade: Eudicots
- Clade: Asterids
- Order: Cornales
- Family: Grubbiaceae; Endl. ex Meisn. (1841)
- Genus: Grubbia; P.J.Bergius (1767)

Type species
- Grubbia rosmarinifolia P.J.Bergius

Species
- Grubbia rosmarinifolia P.J.Bergius; Grubbia rourkei Carlquist; Grubbia tomentosa (Thunb.) Harms

Synonyms
- Lithodia Blume (1847 publ. 1849); Ophira Burm. ex L. (1771); Strobilocarpus Klotzsch (1839)

= Grubbia =

Genus of plants

Grubbia is a genus of flowering plants. It is the sole genus in the family Grubbiaceae. The genus has three species, all endemic to the Cape Floristic Region of South Africa. They are shrubs that grow to 1.5 m (4.9 ft) tall, with tiny flowers and slender, leathery leaves. The fruit is a syncarp.

Grubbia was named by Peter Jonas Bergius in 1767 in a Swedish journal entitled Kongliga Vetenskaps Academiens Handlingar. The generic name honors the Swedish botanist Michael Grubb.

Grubbia was revised by Sherwin Carlquist in 1977. Grubbia gracilis, Grubbia hirsuta, and Grubbia pinifolia had all been recognized, at least by some authors, at species rank, but Carlquist treated them as subspecies or varieties of Grubbia rosmarinifolia. Some authors had recognized a second genus, Strobilocarpus, in the family Grubbiaceae, but Carlquist assigned its two species, Strobilocarpus rourkei and Strobilocarpus tomentosa to Grubbia.

Molecular phylogenetic studies have shown that Grubbia is sister to Curtisia, another genus from South Africa. It has been suggested that Grubbia and Curtisia might be combined into a single family. This was not followed by the Angiosperm Phylogeny Group in the APG III system of 2009.
