= Alangiaceae =

Species of plant

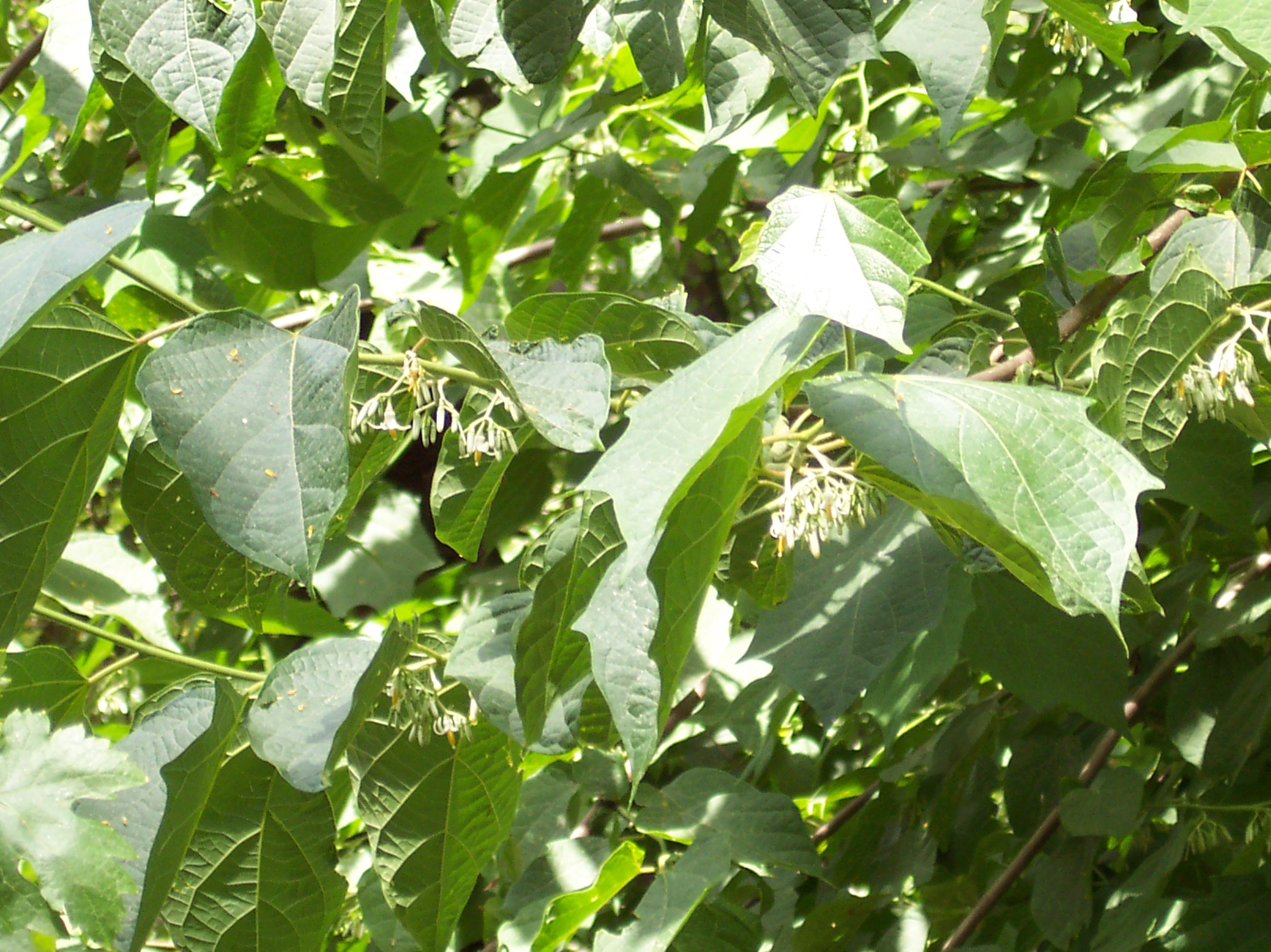
Alangium platanifolium

Alangiaceae was recognized as a small family of small dicotyledon trees, shrubs or lianas, closely related to the Cornaceae (dogwood family).

There is only one genus, Alangium, with seventeen species.

The APG II states that Alangiaceae is a synonym of Cornaceae (the Dogwood family), but still recognizes it as a nom. cons. ( = name to be retained)
