= Karl Schnarf =

Austrian botanist (1879–1947)

Karl Schnarf (12 December 1879 in Vienna – 18 June 1947 in Vienna) was an Austrian botanist, known for his research in the field of plant embryology.

From 1900 he studied natural sciences at the University of Vienna, where one of his instructors was botanist Richard Wettstein. After graduation, he worked as a schoolteacher at gymnasiums in Iglau and Mariahilf. In 1923 he qualified as a lecturer of systematic botany at Vienna, then in 1931, received the title of associate professor. In 1946 he was named head of the institute of plant physiology at the university.

== Selected works ==
- Vergleichende Charakteristik der Vogelblumen: ein ökologisches Sammelreferat, 1913. in: Jahresbericht des K. K. Staatsgymnasiums im VI. Bezirke Wiens über das Schuljahr 1912/1913 Digitized
- Beitrage zur Kenntnis der Samenentwicklung der Labiaten, 1917 – Contribution to the understanding of seed development of Labiatae.
- Embryologie der Angiospermen, 1929. in: Karl Linsbauer's Handbuch der Pflanzenanatomie – Embryology of angiosperms.
- Vergleichende embryologie der angiospermen, 1931 – Comparative embryology of angiosperms.
- Embryologie der gymnospermen, 1933. in Handbuch der Pflanzenanatomie – Embryology of gymnosperms.
- Anatomie der Gymnospermen-Samen, 1937. in Handbuch der Pflanzenanatomie – Anatomy of gymnosperms.
- Vergleichende Cytologie des Geschlechtsapparates der Kormophyten, 1941 – Comparative cytology on the reproductive system of cormophytes.
