= Walther Wangerin =

German botanist (1884–1938)

Walther Wangerin (15 April 1884, in Giebichenstein, Halle an der Saale – 19 April 1938, in Danzig-Langfuhr) was a German botanist.

He studied mathematics and natural sciences at the University of Halle, receiving his doctorate in 1906. Following graduation, he worked as an assistant to Adolf Engler at the botanical garden in Berlin-Dahlem. In 1909 he became a schoolteacher in Burg bei Magdeburg, and from 1913 taught classes at the technical school in Danzig. In 1920 he was appointed divisional director at the Danzig Museum of Natural History and Prehistory.

He made contributions regarding the plant families Alangiaceae, Cornaceae, Garryaceae and Nyssaceae in Engler's Das Pflanzenreich. The botanical genus Wangerinia (E.Franz, 1908; family Caryophyllaceae) is probably named after him, although etymological data is lacking.

== Selected works ==
- Die Umgrenzung und Gliederung der Familie der Cornaceae, 1906 – The delimination and structure of the family Cornaceae.
- Lebensgeschichte der Blütenpflanzen Mitteleuropas : spezielle Ökologie der Blütenpflanzen Deutschlands, Österreichs und der Schweiz (with Oskar von Kirchner, Carl Joseph Schröter, Ernst Loew, 1908) – Life history of the flowering plants of Central Europe: special ecology of the flowering plants of Germany, Austria and Switzerland.
