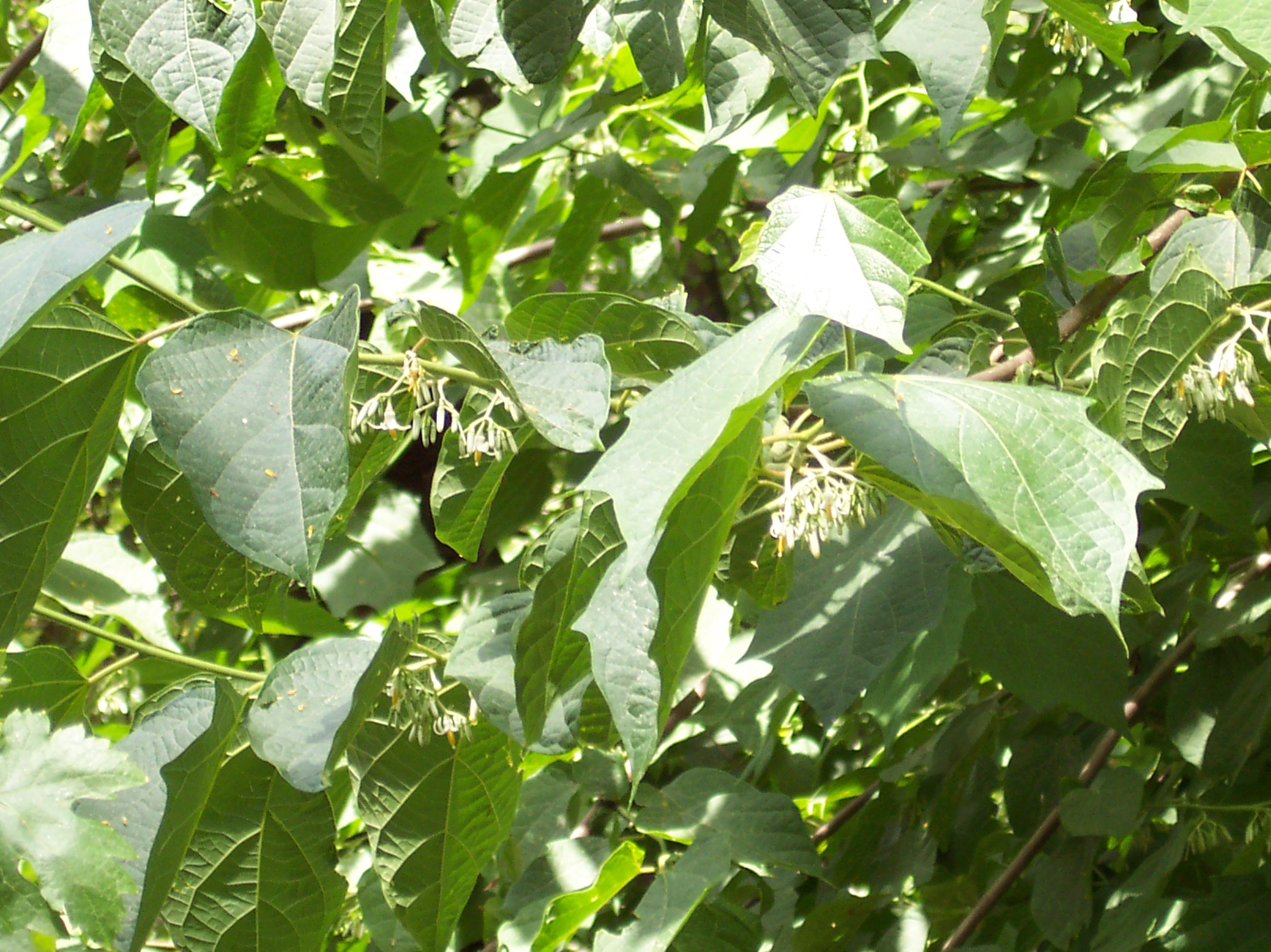
- Alangium platanifolium

Scientific classification
- Kingdom: Plantae
- Clade: Tracheophytes
- Clade: Angiosperms
- Clade: Eudicots
- Clade: Asterids
- Order: Cornales
- Family: Cornaceae
- Genus: Alangium; Lam.

Type species
- Alangium decapetalum Lam.

Species
- See text

Synonyms
- 12 synonyms: Angolam Adans.; Angolamia Scop.; Diacicarpium Blume; Kara-angolam Adans.; Karangolum Kuntze; Marlea Roxb.; Pautsauvia Juss.; Pseudalangium F.Muell.; Rhytidandra A.Gray; Stelanthes Stokes; Stylidium Lour.; Stylis Poir.

= Alangium =

Genus of flowering plants

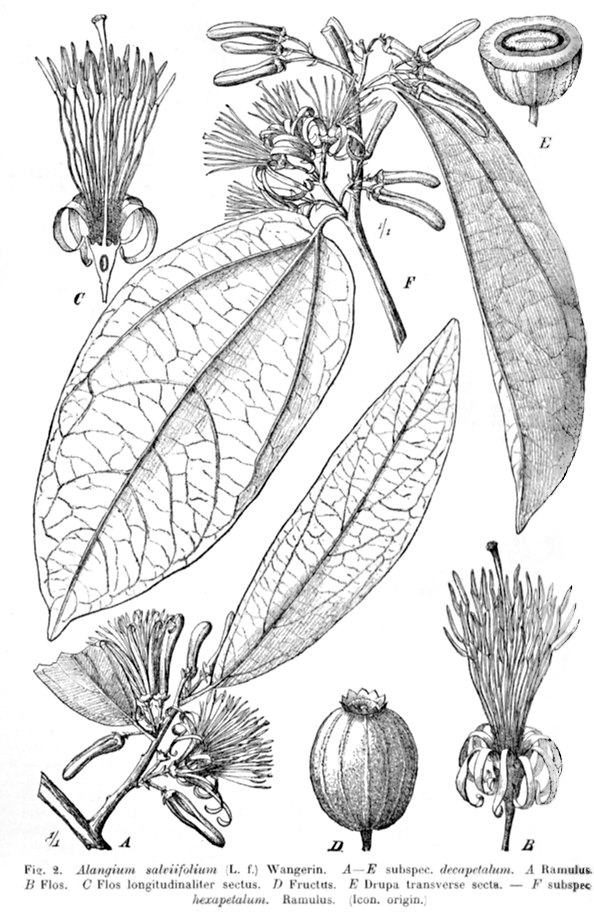
Alangium salviifolium

Alangium is a small genus of flowering plants. The genus is included either in a broad view of the dogwood family Cornaceae, or as the sole member of its own family Alangiaceae. Alangium has about 40 species, but some of the species boundaries are not entirely clear. The type species for Alangium is Alangium decapetalum, which is now treated as a subspecies of Alangium salviifolium. All of the species are shrubs or small trees, except the liana Alangium kwangsiense. A. chinense, A. platanifolium, and A. salviifolium are known in cultivation.

== Description ==
The genus consists of small trees, shrubs and lianas; a few species have spines. Leaves are undivided or lobed, arranged alternately on the twigs, possess a petiole (leaf stem), are without stipules, have domatia and are usually asymmetric. The inflorescences are cymes produced in the leaf axils. The flowers are symmetrical in form, and have both male and female reproductive organs. They have 4–10 petals and sepals and have 4–40 stamens; the style has two to four lobes and the ovary has one or sometimes two locules. The fruit is a drupe with one or two seeds.

== Range ==
It is native to western Africa, Madagascar, southern and eastern Asia (China, Malaysia, Indonesia, and the Philippines), tropical Australia, the western Pacific Ocean islands, and New Caledonia. Most of the species are native to tropical and subtropical regions of east and southeast Asia. Five of the species extend well outside of this area. Alangium platanifolium extends from east Asia into Russia. Alangium chinense extends from southeast Asia to Africa. Alangium salviifolium is the most widespread species, ranging from Africa to Australia, Fiji, and New Caledonia. Alangium villosum occurs from southeast Asia to Australia and the western Pacific islands. Alangium grisolleoides is endemic to Madagascar and gives the genus a disjunct distribution.

Alangium species are used as food plants by the larvae of some moth species in the Geometroidea-Drepanoidea assemblage including engrailed (Geometridae) and the subfamily Cyclidiinae (Drepanidae).

== Etymology ==
The name Alangium is a Latinization, derived from the Malayalam name alangi, which, in Kerala, refers to Alangium salviifolium. It was named in 1783 by Jean-Baptiste Lamarck in his Encyclopédie Méthodique.

== Paleontological record ==
The wood, fruit, and pollen of Alangium are distinctive. Fossils of Alangium have been recognized from the early Eocene of England and the middle Eocene of western North America. In former times, Alangium was far more widespread than it is today.

== Species ==
As of April 2026, Plants of the World Online accepts the following 57 species:

- Alangium alpinum (C.B.Clarke) W.W.Sm. & Cave
- Alangium amplum W.J.de Wilde & Duyfjes
- Alangium barbatum (R.Br. ex C.B.Clarke) Baill. ex Kuntze
- Alangium borneense Merr.
- Alangium brassii W.J.de Wilde & Duyfjes
- Alangium chinense (Lour.) Harms
- Alangium circulare B.C.Stone & Kochummen
- Alangium confertiflorum Y.H.Tan & H.B.Ding
- Alangium denudatum (Bloemb.) W.J.de Wilde & Duyfjes
- Alangium ebenaceum (C.B.Clarke) Harms
- Alangium faberi Oliv.
- Alangium ferrugineum C.T.White
- Alangium frutescens Zoll. & Moritzi
- Alangium glabrum W.J.de Wilde & Duyfjes
- Alangium glandulosum Thwaites
- Alangium gracile W.J.de Wilde & Duyfjes
- Alangium grisolleoides Capuron
- Alangium guadalcanalense W.J.de Wilde & Duyfjes
- Alangium havilandii Bloemb.
- Alangium hexapetalum Lam.
- Alangium hollrungii (K.Schum.) Melch. & Mansf.
- Alangium indochinense W.J.de Wilde & Duyfjes
- Alangium javanicum (Blume) Wangerin
- Alangium kayuniga K.M.Wong
- Alangium kurzii Craib
- Alangium kwangsiense Melch.
- Alangium ledermannii W.J.de Wilde & Duyfjes
- Alangium longiflorum Merr.
- Alangium maliliense Bloemb.
- Alangium melliferum W.J.de Wilde & Duyfjes
- Alangium meyeri Merr.
- Alangium mezianum Wangerin
- Alangium minahassicum (Bloemb.) W.J.de Wilde & Duyfjes
- Alangium nobile (C.B.Clarke) Harms
- Alangium oblongum Craib
- Alangium pallens W.J.de Wilde & Duyfjes
- Alangium pilosum Merr.
- Alangium platanifolium (Siebold & Zucc.) Harms
- Alangium plumbeum W.J.de Wilde & Duyfjes
- Alangium polyosmoides (F.Muell.) W.J.de Wilde & Duyfjes
- Alangium premnifolium Ohwi
- Alangium qingchuanense M.Y.He
- Alangium ridleyi King
- Alangium rotundifolium (Hassk.) Bloemb.
- Alangium salviifolium (L.f.) Wangerin
- Alangium scandens Bloemb.
- Alangium sempervirens W.J.de Wilde & Duyfjes
- Alangium solomonense (Bloemb.) W.J.de Wilde & Duyfjes
- Alangium strigosum W.J.de Wilde & Duyfjes
- Alangium subcordatum W.J.de Wilde & Duyfjes
- Alangium tonkinense Gagnep.
- Alangium uniloculare (Griff.) King
- Alangium velutinum W.J.de Wilde & Duyfjes
- Alangium villosum (Blume) Wangerin
- Alangium vitiense (A.Gray) Baill. ex Harms
- Alangium warburgianum Wangerin
- Alangium yunnanense C.Y.Wu ex W.P.Fang

== Taxonomy ==
In 2011, a phylogenetic analysis of DNA sequences showed that Alangium is sister to Cornus. Since 1939, Alangium has been divided into four sections: Conostigma, Rhytidandra, Marlea, and Alangium. Some authors have raised Marlea and Rhytidandra to generic rank. The intergeneric classification of Alangium will require a few changes.

== Traditional uses ==
One species, Alangium chinense (Chinese: 八角枫; pinyin: bā jiǎo fēng), is considered one of the fifty fundamental herbs in traditional Chinese medicine.
