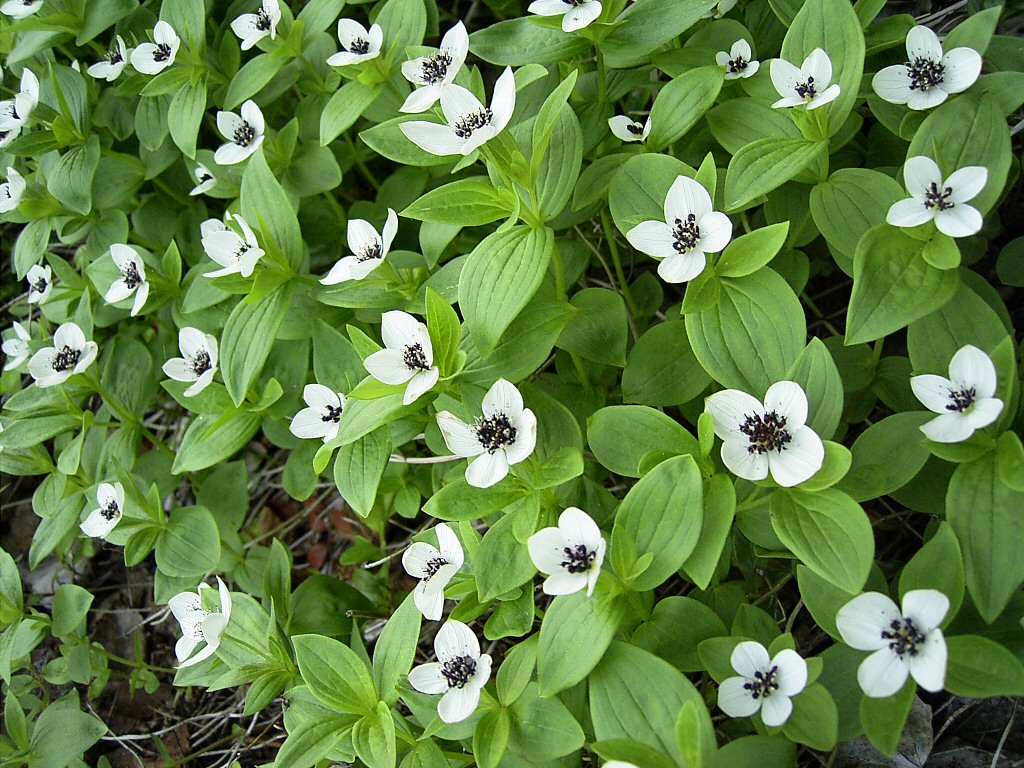
- Cornus suecica

Scientific classification
- Kingdom: Plantae
- Clade: Tracheophytes
- Clade: Angiosperms
- Clade: Eudicots
- Clade: Asterids
- Order: Cornales
- Family: Cornaceae; Bercht. & J.Presl

Genera
- Alangium; Cornus

= Cornaceae =

Family of flowering plants

The Cornaceae, the dogwood family, are a cosmopolitan family of flowering plants in the order Cornales. The family contains approximately 85 species in two genera, Alangium and Cornus. They are mostly trees and shrubs, which may be deciduous or evergreen, although a few species are perennial herbs. Members of the family usually have opposite or alternate simple leaves, four- or five-parted flowers clustered in inflorescences or pseudanthia, and drupaceous fruits. The family is primarily distributed in northern temperate regions and tropical Asia. In northern temperate areas, Cornaceae are well known from the dogwoods Cornus.

The systematics of Cornaceae has been remarkably unsettled and controversial, and many genera have been added to it and removed from it over time. (One researcher called it a "dustbin".) Molecular phylogenetics have clarified the relatedness of some associated genera, and at least nine genera that were previously included in Cornaceae have been eliminated from the order Cornales entirely, but the circumscription of Cornaceae is still unclear. The Angiosperm Phylogeny Group usually defines Cornaceae as comprising the genera Cornus and Alangium as well as five genera now separated into the family Nyssaceae. However, many of these genera are sometimes split off into their own families (e.g. Alangiaceae), and the usage remains inconsistent.

== Fossil record ==
The oldest fossil that can be related to Cornaceae is †Hironoia fusiformis, an extinct taxon collected from the Futaba Group sediments at Kamitikaba, Japan. Synapomorphies of the fruits of the fossil occur also in extant Cornaceae. The age of the sediments is of early Coniacian to early Santonian (about 88 Ma). Although the mosaic of characters in Hironoia precludes assignment to an extant genus, the fiber rather than sclereid composition of the fruit places it within the Nyssaceae-Mastixiaceae. Other possible Cornaceae from Cretaceous sediments include endocarps resembling Cornus from the Santonian-Campanian mesofossil assemblage of Åsen. In slightly younger Late Cretaceous sediments (Maastrichtian) four genera of fossil mastixioid fruits (Beckettia, Eomastixia, Mastixicarpum and Mastixiopsis) have been described from Germany.
