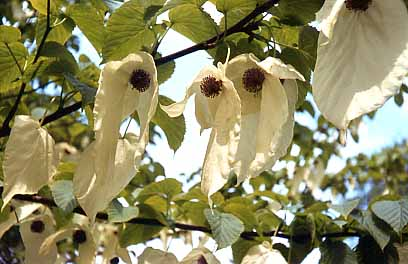
- Dove tree in flower, a species in Nyssaceae

Scientific classification
- Kingdom: Plantae
- Clade: Tracheophytes
- Clade: Angiosperms
- Clade: Eudicots
- Clade: Asterids
- Order: Cornales; Link

Families
- Cornaceae; Curtisiaceae; Grubbiaceae; Hydrangeaceae; Hydrostachyaceae; Loasaceae; Nyssaceae

= Cornales =

Cornales Temporal range: Coniacian–Recent

Order of flowering plants

The Cornales are an order of flowering plants, early diverging among the asterids, containing about 600 species. Plants within the Cornales usually have four-parted flowers, drupaceous fruits, and inferior to half-inferior gynoecia topped with disc-shaped nectaries.

== Taxonomy ==
In the classification system of Dahlgren the Cornales were in the superorder Corniflorae (also called Cornanae). Under the APG IV system, the Cornales order includes these families:

- Cornaceae (the dogwood family)
- Curtisiaceae (cape lancewood)
- Grubbiaceae (the sillyberry family)
- Hydrangeaceae (the hydrangea family)
- Hydrostachyaceae
- Loasaceae (the stickleaf family)
- Nyssaceae, (the tupelos)

The oldest fossils assigned with confidence to the order are Hironoia fusiformis, described from Coniacian age Japanese coalified fruits, and Suciacarpa starrii described from American permineralized fruits of Campanian age.

=== Phylogeny ===
The Cornales order is sister to the remainder of the large and diverse asterid clade. The Cornales are highly geographically disjunct and morphologically diverse, which has led to considerable confusion regarding the proper circumscription of the groups within the order and the relationships between them. Under the Cronquist system, the order comprised the families Cornaceae, Nyssaceae, Garryaceae, and Alangiaceae, and was placed among the Rosidae, but this interpretation is no longer followed. Many families and genera previously associated with the Cornales have been removed, including Garryaceae, Griselinia, Corokia, and Kaliphora, among others.

Likely cladogram for Cornales:

- Cornales
  - - - - Hydrangeaceae
        - Loasaceae
      - Hydrostachyaceae
    - Nyssaceae
  - - - Grubbiaceae
      - Curtisiaceae
    - Cornaceae

Molecular data suggest four clades are within the Cornales: Cornus-Alangium, nyssoids-mastixioids, Hydrangeaceae-Loasaceae, and Grubbia-Curtisia, with the Hydrostachyaceae in an uncertain position, possibly basal. However, the relationship between these clades is unclear, and as a result of many historical taxonomic interpretations and differing opinions regarding the significance of morphological variations, rankings of taxa within the order are inconsistent. These difficulties in interpreting the systematics of Cornales may represent an early and rapid diversification of the groups within the order.
