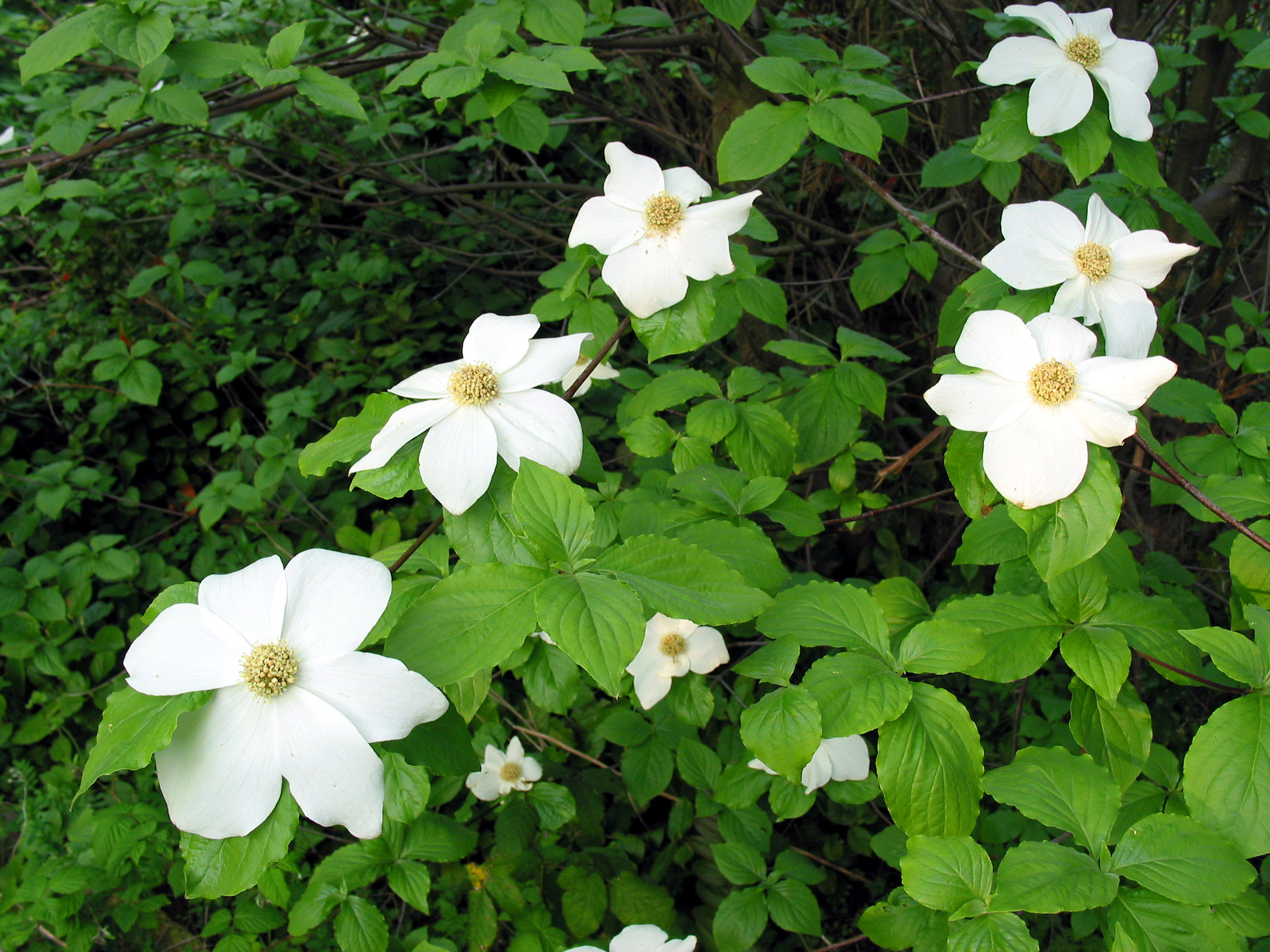

Conservation status
- Least Concern (IUCN 3.1)

- Secure (NatureServe)

Scientific classification
- Kingdom: Plantae
- Clade: Tracheophytes
- Clade: Angiosperms
- Clade: Eudicots
- Clade: Asterids
- Order: Cornales
- Family: Cornaceae
- Genus: Cornus
- Subgenus: Cornus subg. Cynoxylon
- Species: C. nuttallii

Binomial name
- Cornus nuttallii Audubon ex Torr. & A.Gray
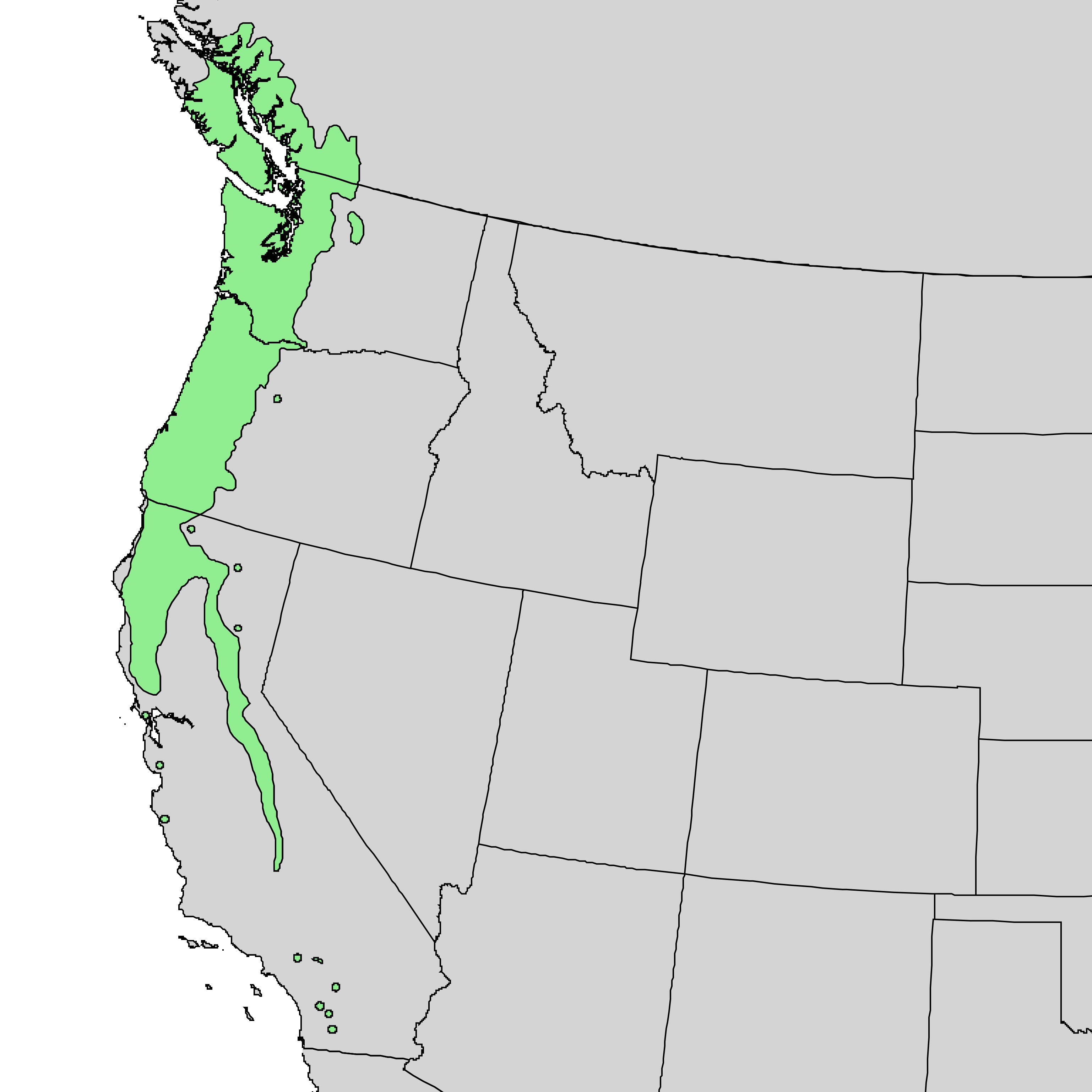
- Natural range

Synonyms
- Benthamidia nuttallii (Audubon ex Torr. & A.Gray) Moldenke

= Cornus nuttallii =

Pacific Dogwood

Species of plant

Cornus nuttallii, the Pacific dogwood, western dogwood, or mountain dogwood, is a species of dogwood native to western North America. The tree's name used by Halkomelem-speaking nations is Kwi’txulhp.

== Description ==
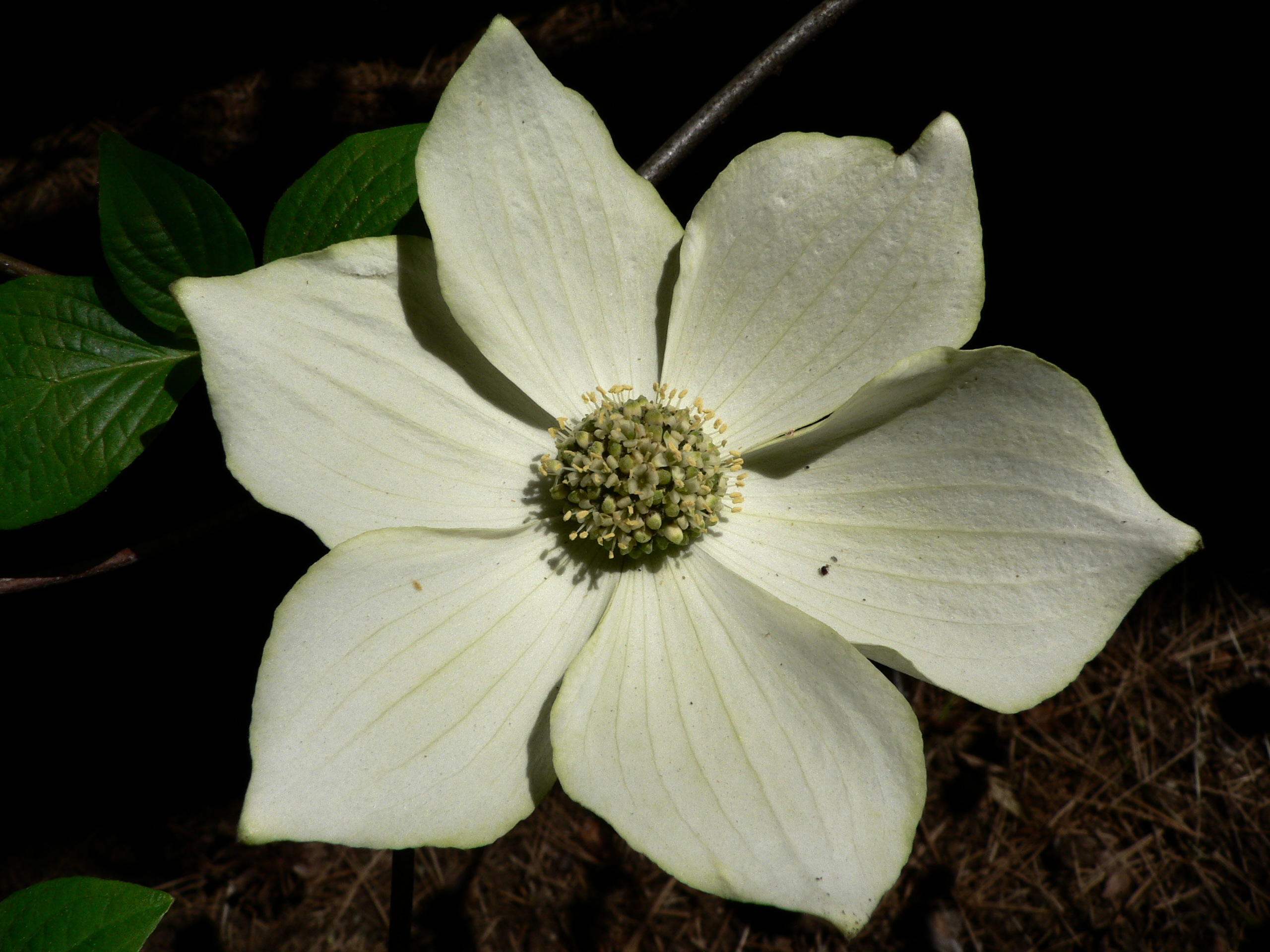
The small flowers are in a dense cluster surrounded by large white bracts.

It is a small to medium-sized deciduous tree, reaching 6–23 metres (20–75 feet) tall, often with a canopy spread of 6 m (20 ft). Its habit varies based on the level of sunlight; in full sun it will have a short trunk with a crown as wide as it is tall, while under a canopy it will have a tapered trunk with a short, slender crown. The trunk attains 15–30 centimetres (6–12 in) in diameter. The bark is reddish brown.

The branches have fine hairs and the young bark is thin and smooth, becoming scale-like with ridges as it ages.

The leaves are opposite, simple, oval, 5–13 cm (2–5 in) long, and 3.8–7.1 cm (1 1/2–3 in) broad. They are green with stiff, appressed hairs on top, and hairier and lighter on the bottom. They turn orange to purplish in autumn.

The flowers are individually small and inconspicuous, 2–3 millimetres (1/16–1/8 in) across, produced in a dense, rounded, greenish-white flower head 2 cm (3/4 in) in diameter; the 4–8 large white 'petals' are actually bracts, each bract 4–7 cm (1 1/2–2 3/4 in) long and broad, creating the appearance of a larger flower head. The flowers commonly bloom twice per season, once in the spring and again in late summer or early fall.

Appearing in September or October, the fruit is a compound pink-red or orange drupe about 1–1.5 cm (1/2–1/2 in) long. They are produced in clusters containing 20–40 drupelets, each of which contains two seeds. The fruits are unpalatable.

=== Similar species ===
The eastern United States' Cornus florida (flowering dogwood) is similar in appearance and possibly in chemical composition. Cornus canadensis has similar blossoms but grows as a groundcover.

== Etymology ==
In 1806, Meriwether Lewis noted that the species is similar in appearance to C. florida. However, when Scottish botanist David Douglas encountered C. nuttalli on his expedition to the Pacific Northwest in the 1820s, he mistook it for C. florida and did not send seeds back to England.

English botanist Thomas Nuttall was the first to describe the species for science while staying at Fort Vancouver in the autumn of 1834. It was named nuttallii after him by his friend John James Audubon.

The common names comes from that of Cornus sanguinea, the hard wood of which Northern Europeans used to make nails ("dags") during the medieval era.

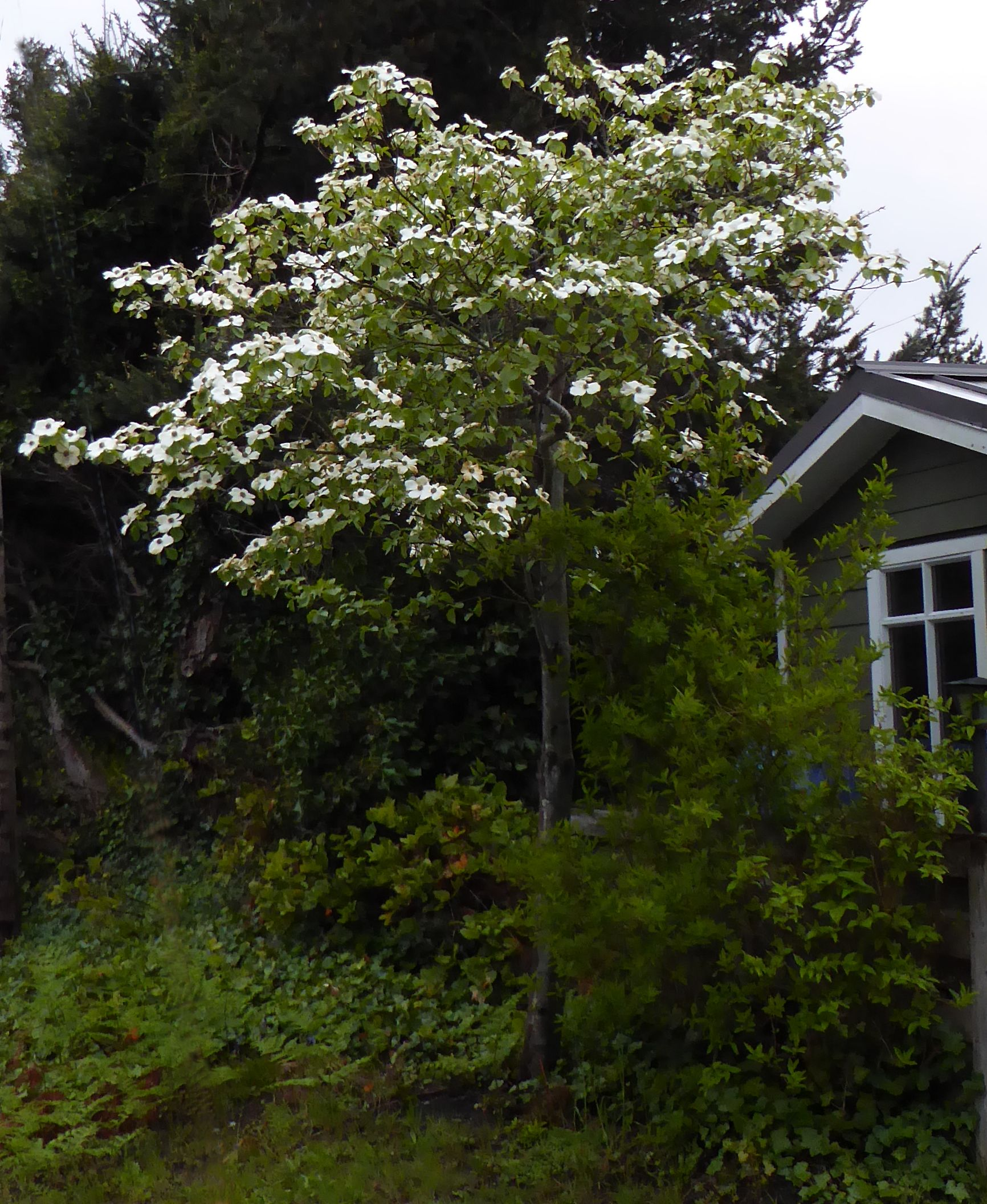
British Columbia Dogwood in flower.

== Distribution and habitat ==
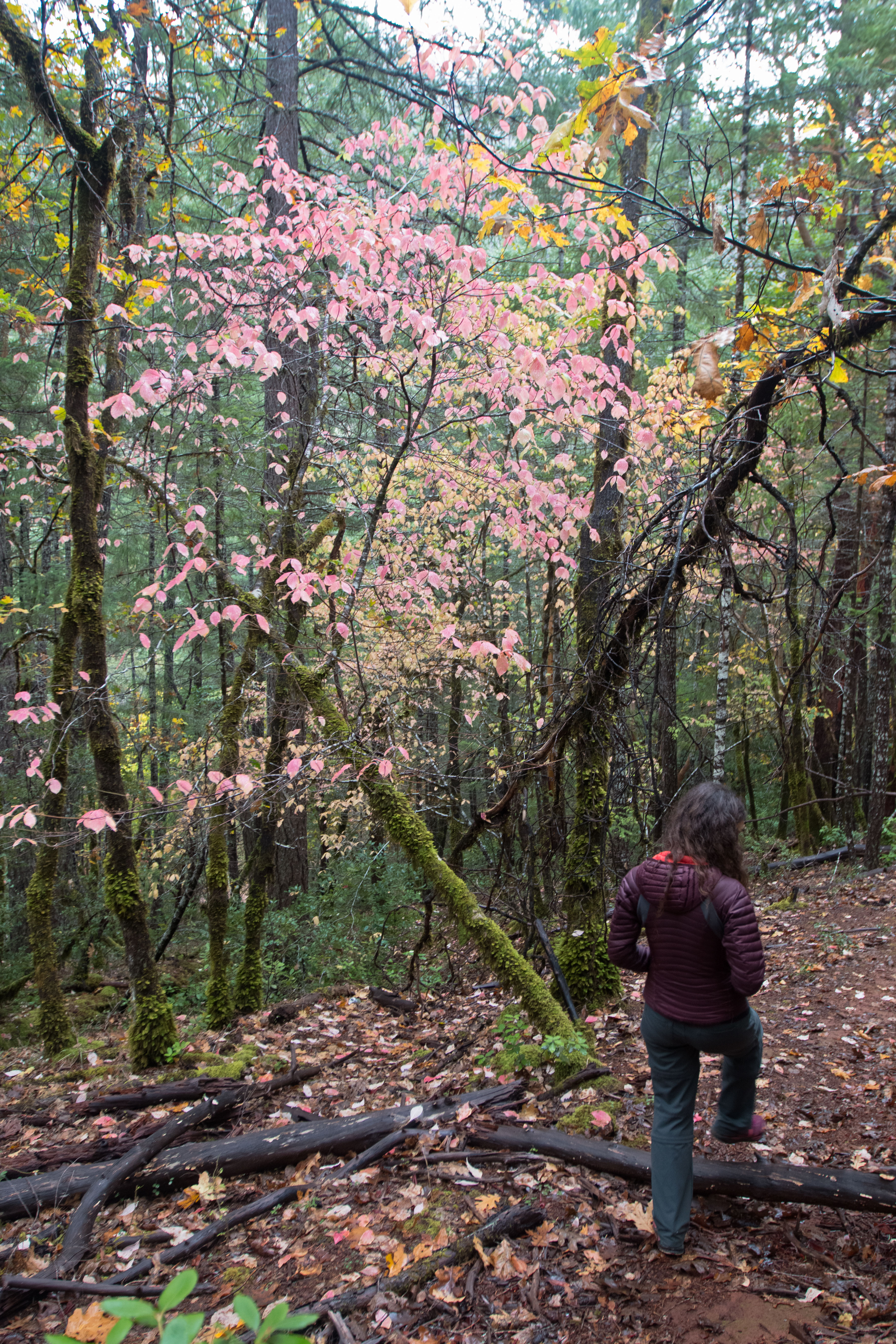
Pacific Dogwood in the understory of a forest, showing its typical habit.

It occurs from the lowlands of southern British Columbia to the mountains of southern California. There exists an inland population in central Idaho, where it is considered critically imperiled. It occurs predominantly below 1,500 m (4,900 ft) in elevation.

Cultivated examples are found as far north as Haida Gwaii.

It has high flood tolerance, and is common along streams with moist but well-drained soils, often on gentle slopes. Soil composition can range from clay to sandy loam, and it prefers a high humus content, moderate to high nutrient levels, and acidic soils with a pH from 5.5 to 6. It has low frost tolerance, and is usually found in low-elevation temperate or mesothermal climates. It is hardy to USDA zone 7.

== Ecology ==
=== Value to animals ===
New sprouts are good browse for both wild and domesticated ungulates, especially after a recent fire, but the mature foliage is usually ignored by all species except slugs.

The fruit are eaten by deer mice, pileated woodpeckers, the band-tailed pigeon, and bears.

It provides habitat and cover to small birds such as Wilson's warbler, and small mammals including the red tree vole.

=== Diseases ===
Like the related Cornus florida, it is very susceptible to dogwood anthracnose, a disease caused by the fungus Discula destructiva. Fungal activity is greatest from May to July, although it can be active any time conditions are moist and the plant is growing. Infected leaves become blotched and drop, and defoliation can be extreme. Twigs and leaf buds are also impacted. This has killed many of the larger plants in the wild and has also restricted its use as an ornamental tree, to the point where it is considered threatening to the species in its native range.

=== Successional status ===
It is present in all stages of both primary and secondary succession – from new colonization on glacial outwash or areas destroyed by the 1980 eruption of Mount St. Helens, to late seral and even climax communities. It is shade tolerant but prefers sunlight in sufficiently humid conditions.

It is adapted to a wide variety of fire regimes, with intervals ranging from just one year on dry sites, to 500 years or more in moist, riparian zones. The tree can survive low severity wildfires which are not hot enough to kill buds protected by bark. After being severely burned, Cornus nuttali typically resprouts from the root crown – however, the resulting shoots are so palatable to mule deer that they are at risk of being killed by over-browsing.

== Uses ==
Some Plateau Indian tribes such as the Nlaka'pamux used the bark as a brown dye. Those groups also used the bark for medicinal purposes as a blood purifier, lung strengthener, stomach treatment, laxative, and emetic.

It is mostly prized as a cultivated ornamental.

== In culture ==
It has been the provincial flower of British Columbia since 1956. It was once protected by law in the province (in an act which also protected Rhododendron macrophyllum and Trillium ovatum), but this was repealed in 2002.
