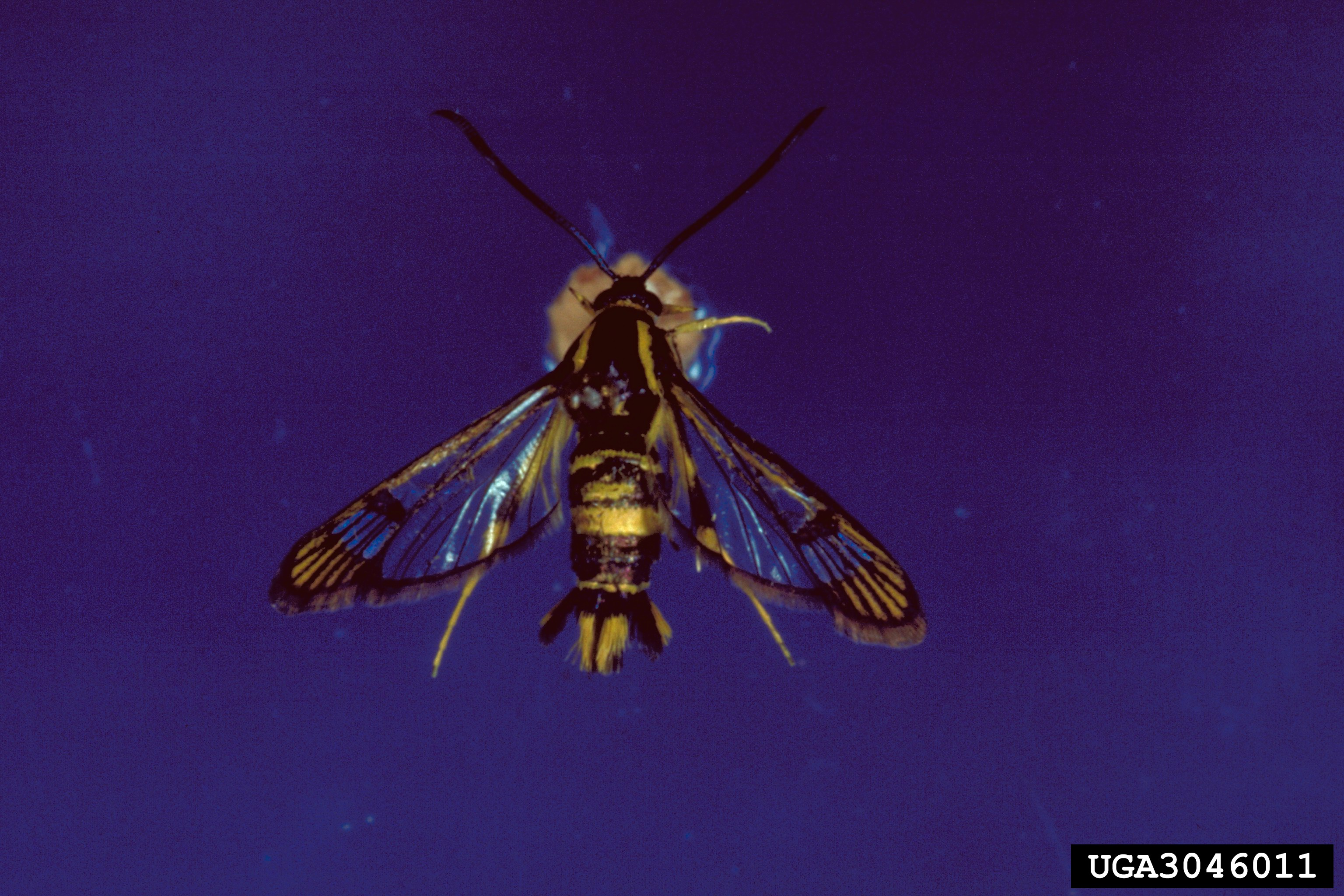
- An adult
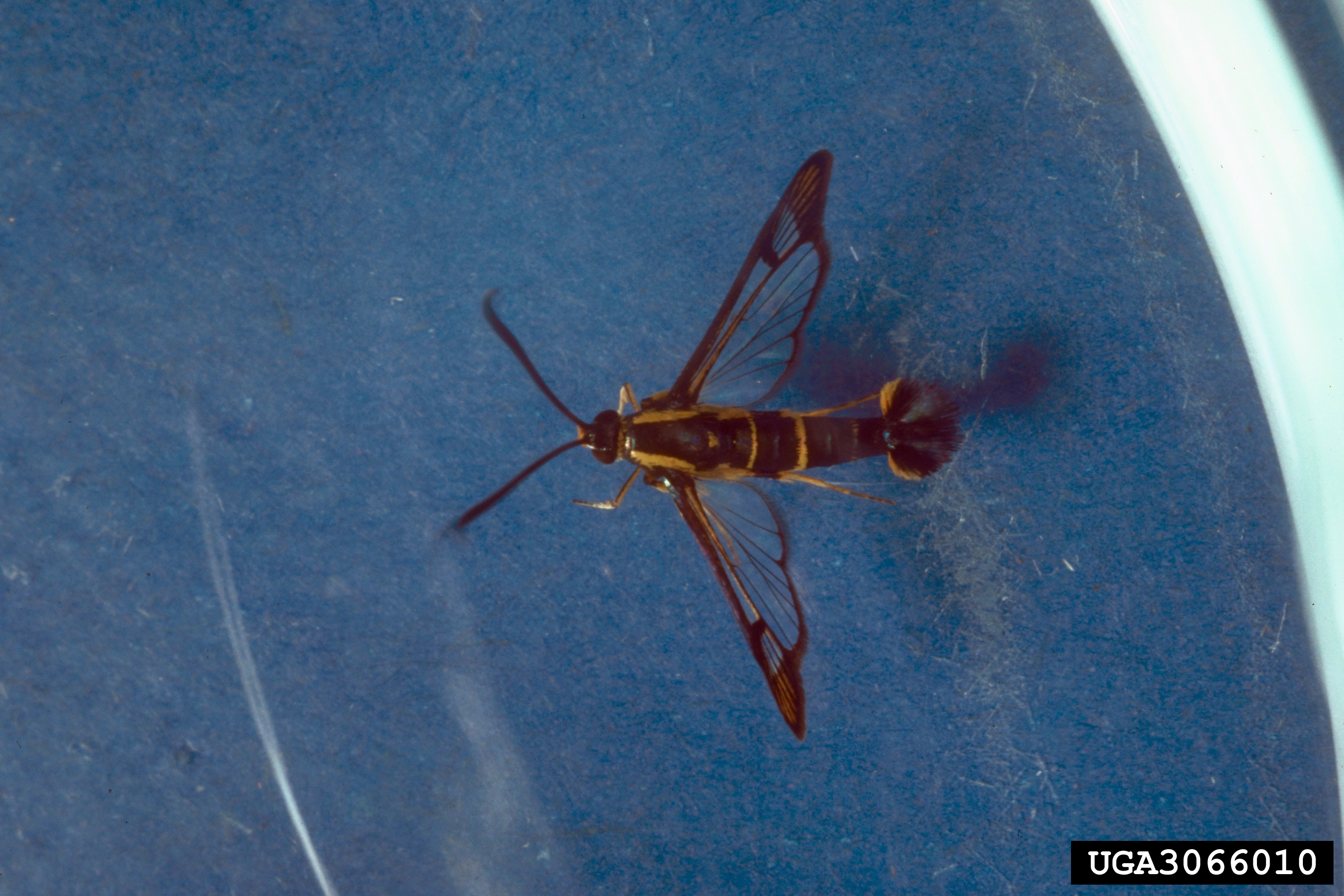

Scientific classification
- Kingdom: Animalia
- Phylum: Arthropoda
- Clade: Pancrustacea
- Class: Insecta
- Order: Lepidoptera
- Family: Sesiidae
- Genus: Synanthedon
- Species: S. scitula

Binomial name
- Synanthedon scitula (Harris, 1839)

Synonyms
- Aegeria scitula Harris, 1839; Trochilium gallivorum (Westwood, 1854); Trochilium hospes (Walsh, 1867); Aegeria corusca (Edwards, 1881); Aegeria aemula (Edwards, 1883)

= Synanthedon scitula =

Species of moth

Synanthedon scitula, the dogwood borer or pecan borer, is a moth that is a pest of many plants including the dogwood and pecan. It is notorious due to the severity of damage it can cause and its widespread geographical distribution.

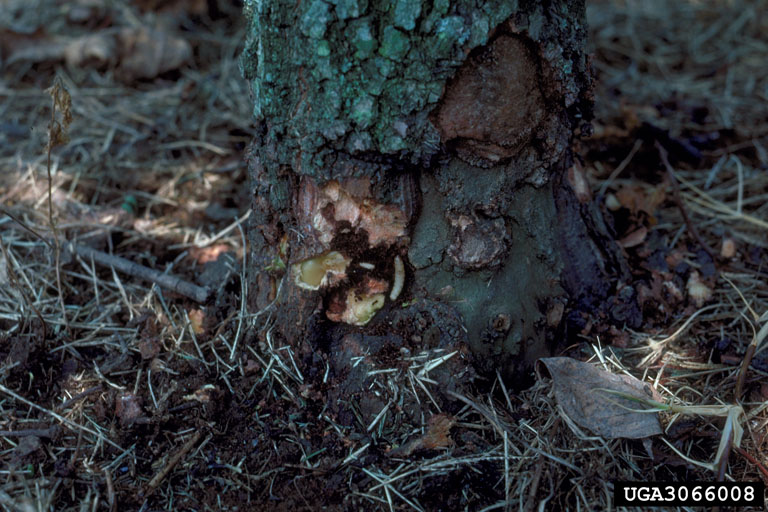
Damage

== Description and ecology ==
=== Eggs ===
Synanthedon scitula eggs are a light chestnut brown color and are 0.4 to 0.6 millimeters across. They are marked with a hexagonal pattern of lines. The eggs are laid singly by the mother and take 8–9 days to hatch.

=== Larvae ===
Synanthedon scitula larvae are cream colored with a red head. They pass through six instars ranging in length from 1 millimeter to 15 millimeters or more at the last instar. Soon after hatching they burrow into the burrknot tissue or areas around bark scales. As the dogwood borer larvae feed red frass is pushed to the surface. It collects and is pushed to the surface and held together by silk. Larvae overwinter in their feeding tunnel, and resume eating whenever the temperature exceeds 45 to 50 degrees Fahrenheit, or 7 to 10 degrees Celsius.

=== Pupae ===
The larvae pupate in their feeding tunnel in a tough silken cocoon covered with bits of frass. The length of pupation varies from 8 to 20 days, depending on the temperature and other factors. Before its emergence, the pupa pushes out of its cocoon and emerges on the soft burrknot tissue. The amber-colored pupal case often remains on the burrknot after the adult emerges.

=== Adults ===
The average adult has a wing span of 18 to 22 millimeters. Both the fore and hind wings are mostly clear, and the thorax and the abdomen are navy blue or black with yellow markings. Female dogwood borers' fourth abdominal segment is entirely yellow, while the male's is black with a narrow yellow ring. In the Northeast, adult emergence begins in early June and continues into early September, peaking in mid July. The adults' emergence begins earlier further south.

== Control ==
The most recommended method of control is to avoid the development of the burrknot. However, rootstocks without the tendency to make a burrknot have not yet been developed. Several types of fungi and parasitoids have been reported to attack the dogwood borer but have not been used yet effectively against the pest.

== Damage and diet ==
The dogwood borer does damage to various trees and shrubs, including apple, bayberry, black cherry, blueberry, beech, birch, chestnut, dogwood, elm, hazel, hickory, mountain-ash, oak, pecan, pine and willow trees. There are three main feeding types that the dogwood borer has that results in various degrees of damage.

- Type I - This is the most frequent feeding style. Feeding is confined to the burrknot. One or more larvae feed in tunnels below the root surface. At first, feeding is quite shallow, but subsequent feeding may extend as far as 3/4-inch toward the center of the trunk. This feeding type is the least harmful for the tree due to the confinement of the feeding.
- Type II - This type of feeding usually happens because of heavy or repeated feeding of the burrknot. As the burrknot tissue is consumed, the larvae move outward to look for food and begin to feed on the cambium adjacent to the burrknot. This is more damaging than the first type.
- Type III - This is the least frequent but most harmful of all the types of infestation. It usually occurs in the bark and in the main trunk of a tree. Feeding outside the burrknot is thought to be more harmful to the tree because healthy tissue is destroyed. These infestations have the potential to kill or girdle a tree but usually result in a slow decline and yield reduction for the tree.
