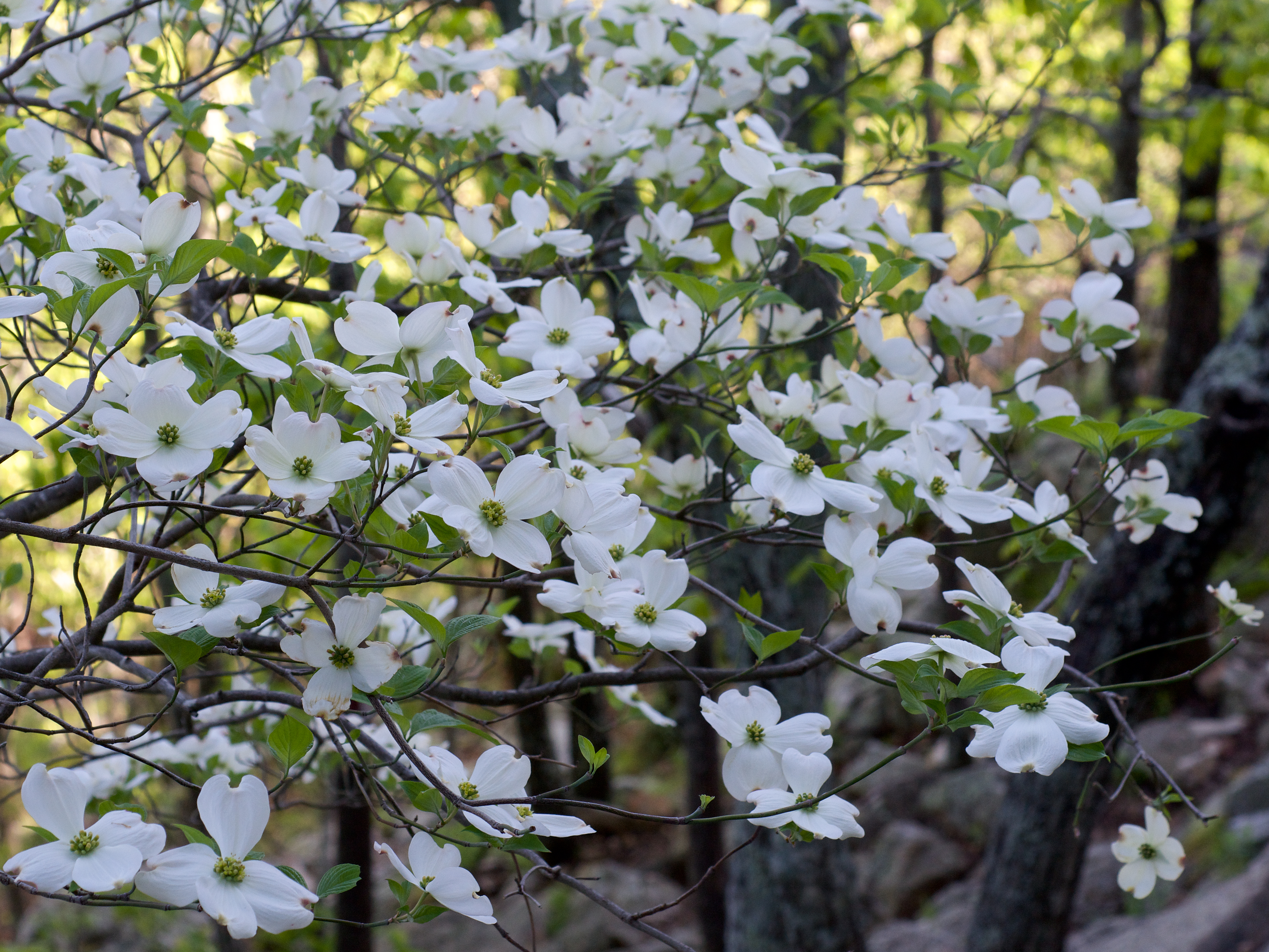
- Flowering dogwood in Spring

Conservation status
- Least Concern (IUCN 3.1)

- Secure (NatureServe)

Scientific classification
- Kingdom: Plantae
- Clade: Tracheophytes
- Clade: Angiosperms
- Clade: Eudicots
- Clade: Asterids
- Order: Cornales
- Family: Cornaceae
- Genus: Cornus
- Subgenus: Cornus subg. Cynoxylon
- Species: C. florida

Binomial name
- Cornus florida L.
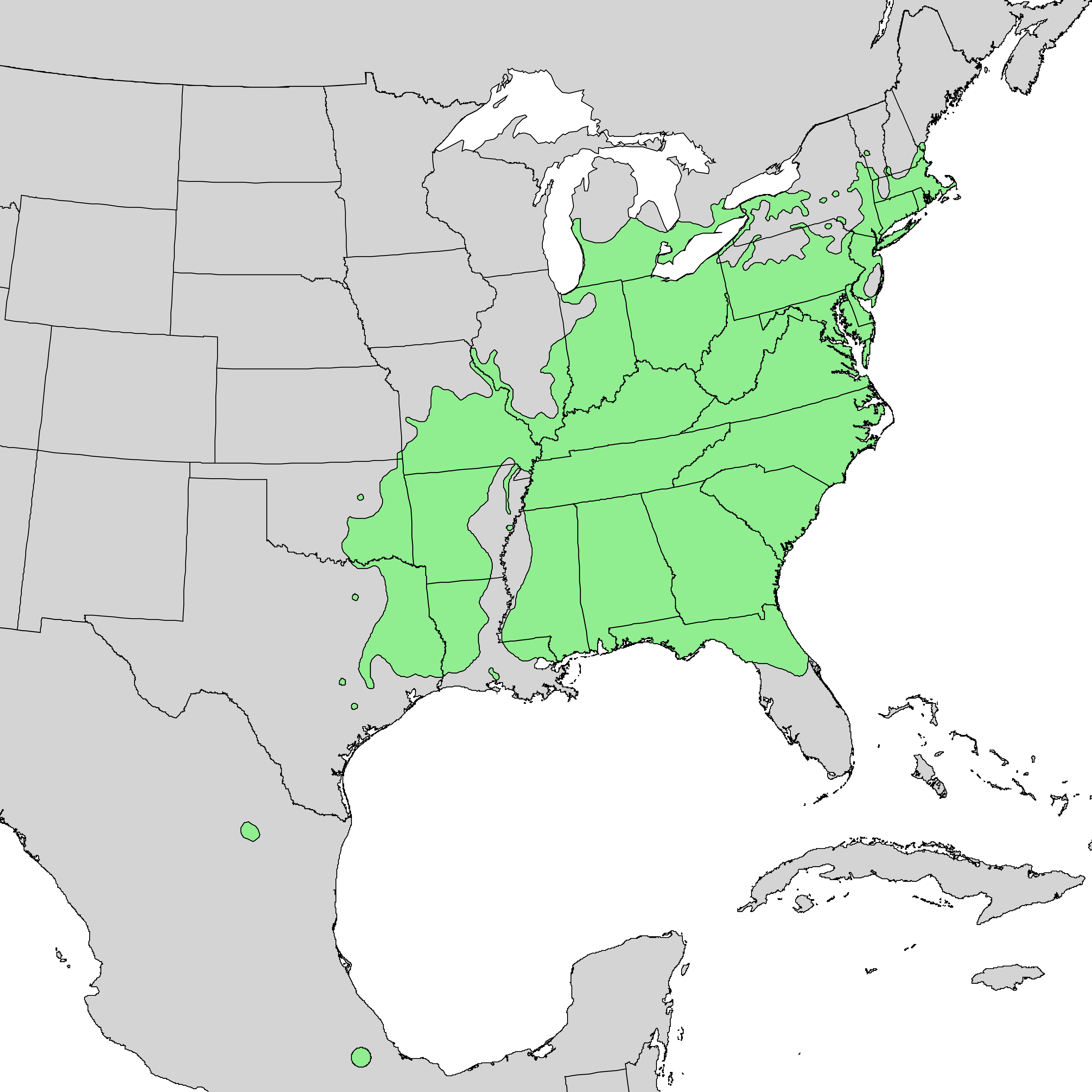
- Natural range of Cornus florida

Synonyms
- Benthamidia florida (L.) Nakai; Benthamidia florida (L.) Spach; Cornus candidissima Mill.; Cynoxylon floridum (L.) Britton & Shafer; Swida candidissima (Mill.) Small; Cornus urbiniana Rose, syn of subsp. urbiniana

= Cornus florida =

Species of flowering plant in the dogwood family

Cornus florida, the flowering dogwood or American dogwood, is a species of flowering tree in the family Cornaceae native to eastern North America and northern Mexico. An endemic population once spanned from southernmost coastal Maine south to northern Florida and west to the Mississippi River. The tree is commonly planted as an ornamental in residential and public areas because of its showy bracts and interesting bark structure.

== Description ==
Flowering dogwood is a small deciduous tree growing to 10 m (33 ft) high, often wider than it is tall when mature, with a trunk diameter of up to 30 cm (1 ft). A 10-year-old tree will stand about 5 m (16 ft) tall. The leaves are opposite, simple, ovate, 6–13 cm (2.4–5.1 in) long and 4–6 cm (1.6–2.4 in) broad, with an apparently entire margin (actually very finely toothed, under a lens); they turn a rich red-brown in fall.

Flowering dogwood attains its greatest size and growth potential in the Upper South, sometimes up to 40 feet in height. At the northern end of its range, heights of 30–33 feet are more typical. Hot, humid summer weather is necessary for new growth to harden off in the fall.

The maximum lifespan of C. florida is about 80 years.

The flowers are individually small, inconspicuous, and hermaphroditic, with four, greenish-yellow petals (not bracts) 4 mm (0.16 in) long. Around 20 flowers are produced in a dense, rounded, umbel-shaped inflorescence, 1–2 cm (0.39–0.79 in) in diameter. This central flower head is surrounded by four conspicuous large white, pink or red bracts (not petals), each bract 3 cm (1.2 in) long and 2.5 cm (0.98 in) broad, rounded, and often with a distinct notch at the apex.

When in the wild they can typically be found at the forest edge and frequently on dry ridges. While most of the wild trees have white bracts, some selected cultivars of this tree also have pink bracts, some even almost a true red. They typically flower in early April in the southern part of their range, to late April or early May in northern and high altitude areas. The similar Kousa dogwood (Cornus kousa), native to Asia, flowers about a month later.

The fruit is a cluster of two to ten separate drupes, (fused in Cornus kousa), each 10–15 mm (0.39–0.59 in) long and about 8 mm (0.31 in) wide, which ripen in the late summer and the early fall to a bright red, or occasionally yellow with a rosy blush. They are an important food source for dozens of species of birds, which then distribute the seeds. They are also a larval host plant for several moth varieties, including Eudeilinia herminiata, the dogwood thyatirid moth, Antispila cornifoliella, the stinging rose moth, the grand arches moth, the pecan bark borer, the dogwood borer, the rosaceous leaf roller, the diamondback epinotia moth, spring azures, cecropia moths, and the Io moth. The fruit is extremely sour and unpleasant-tasting. Flowering dogwood is monoecious, meaning the tree has both male and female flowers, and all trees will produce fruit.

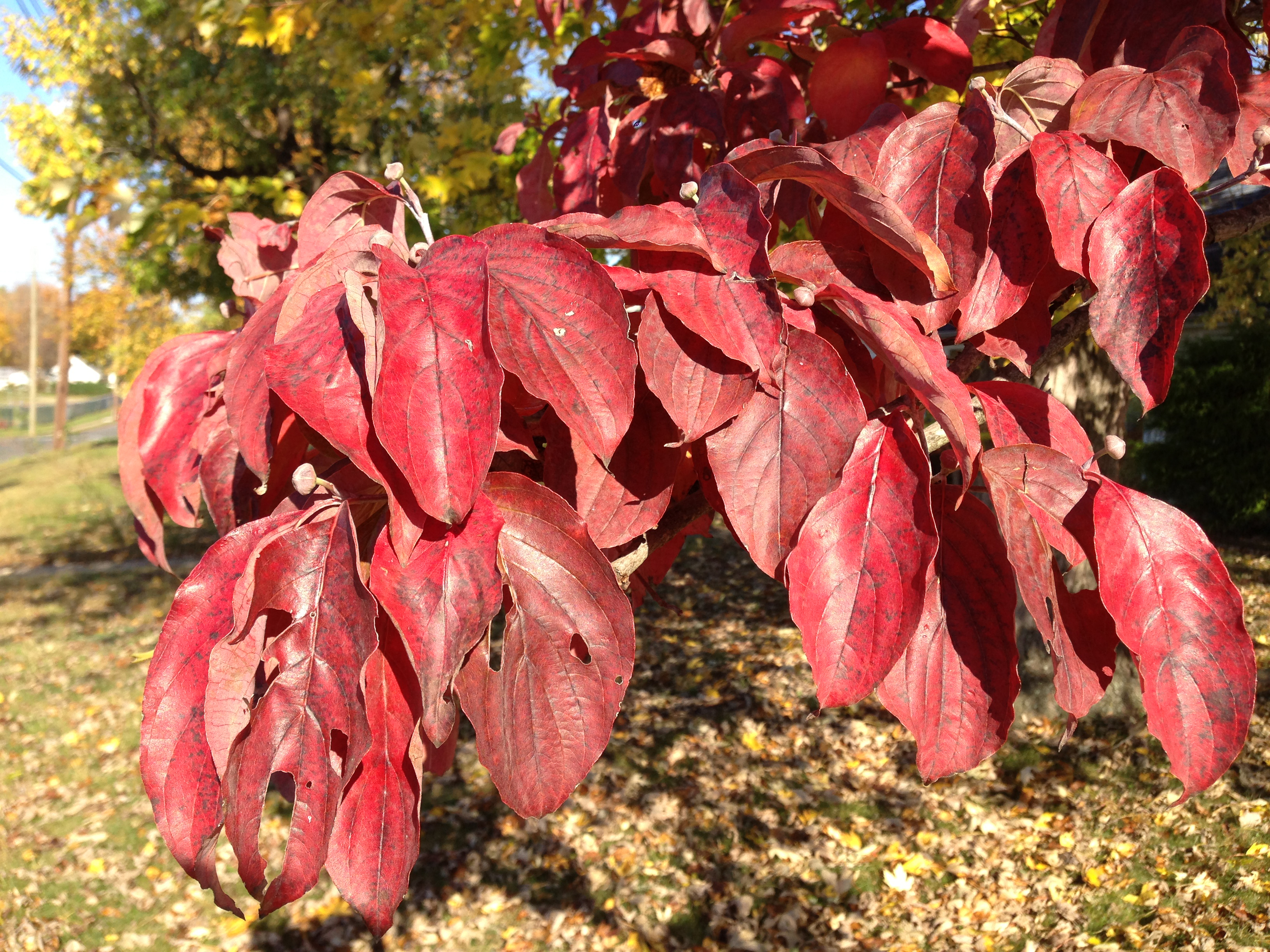
Foliage during autumn

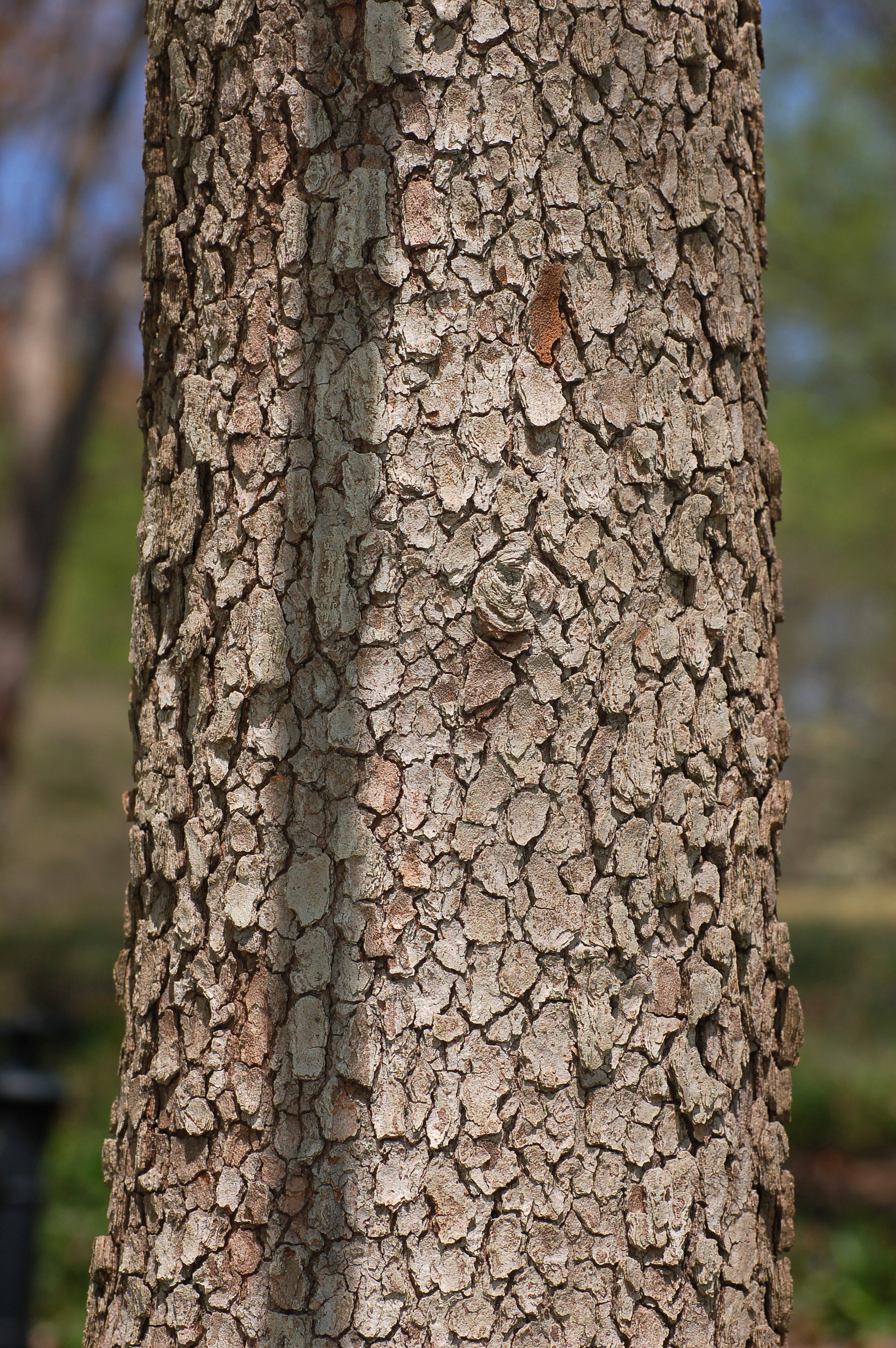
Bark

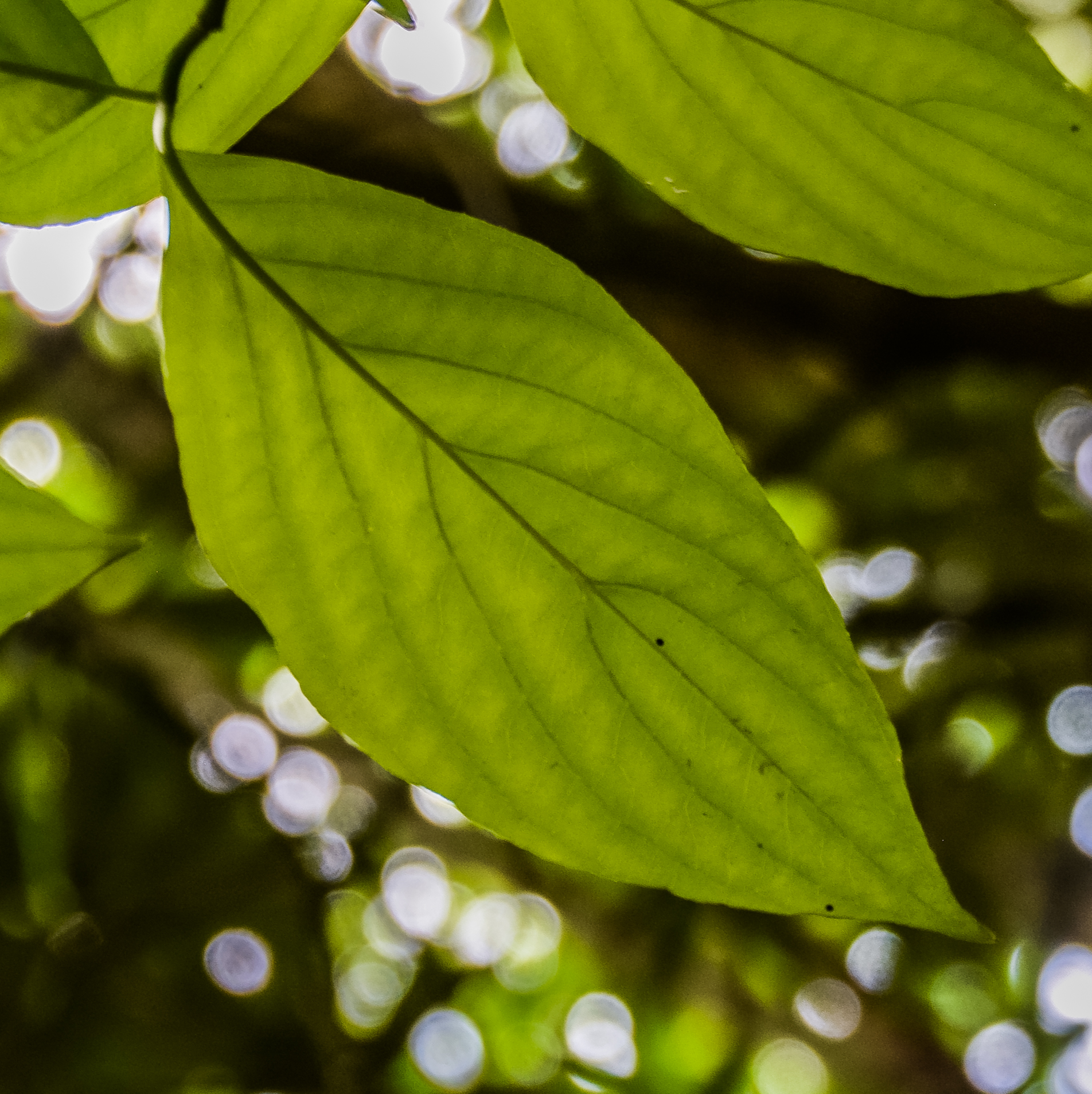
Leaf

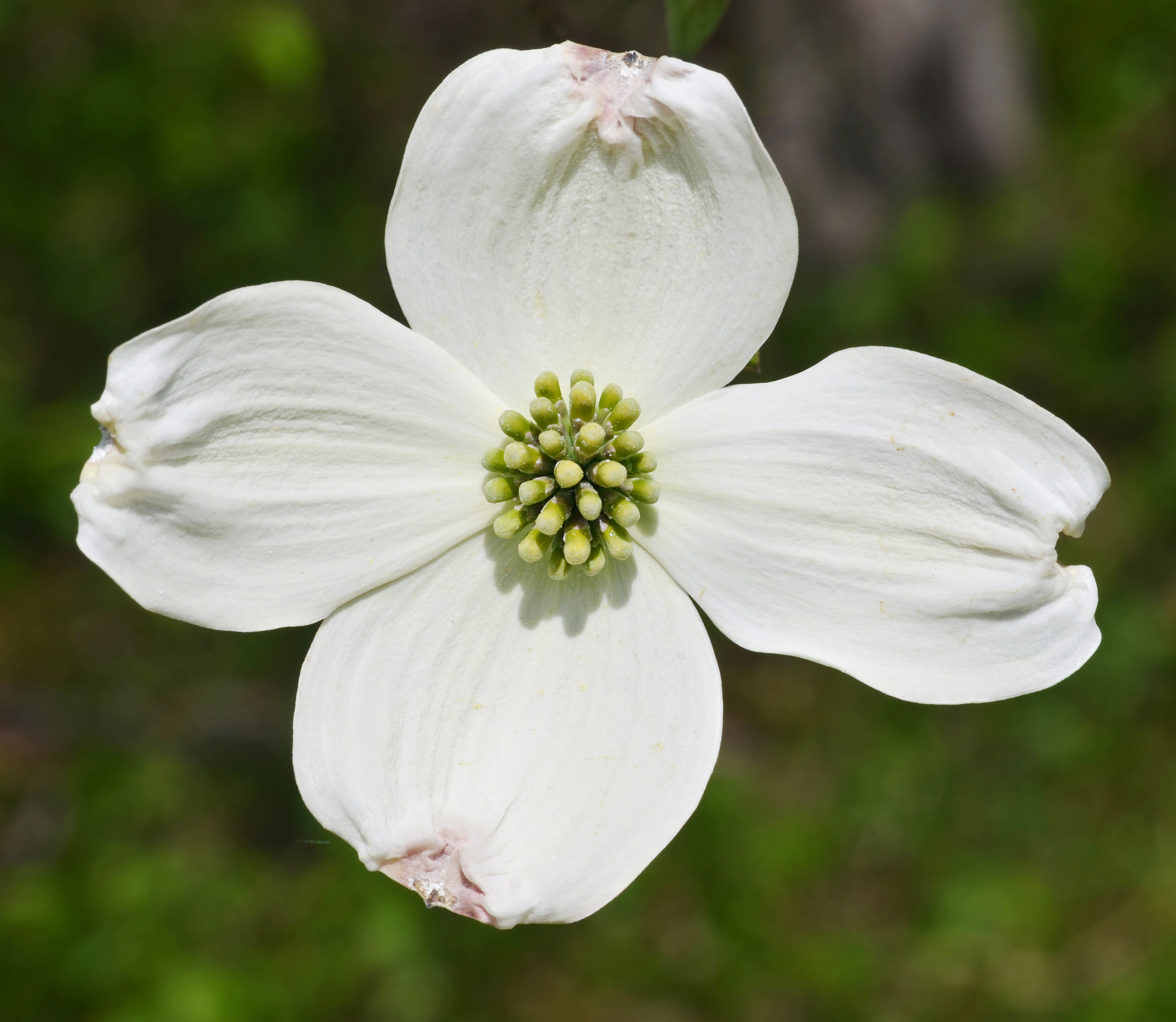
Flower head with four large bracts

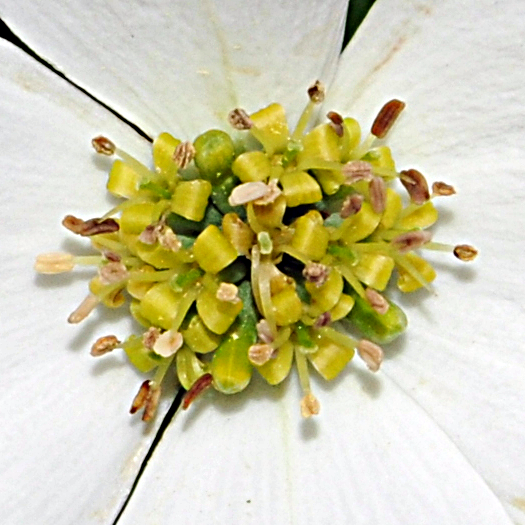
Close-up of four-petaled flowers

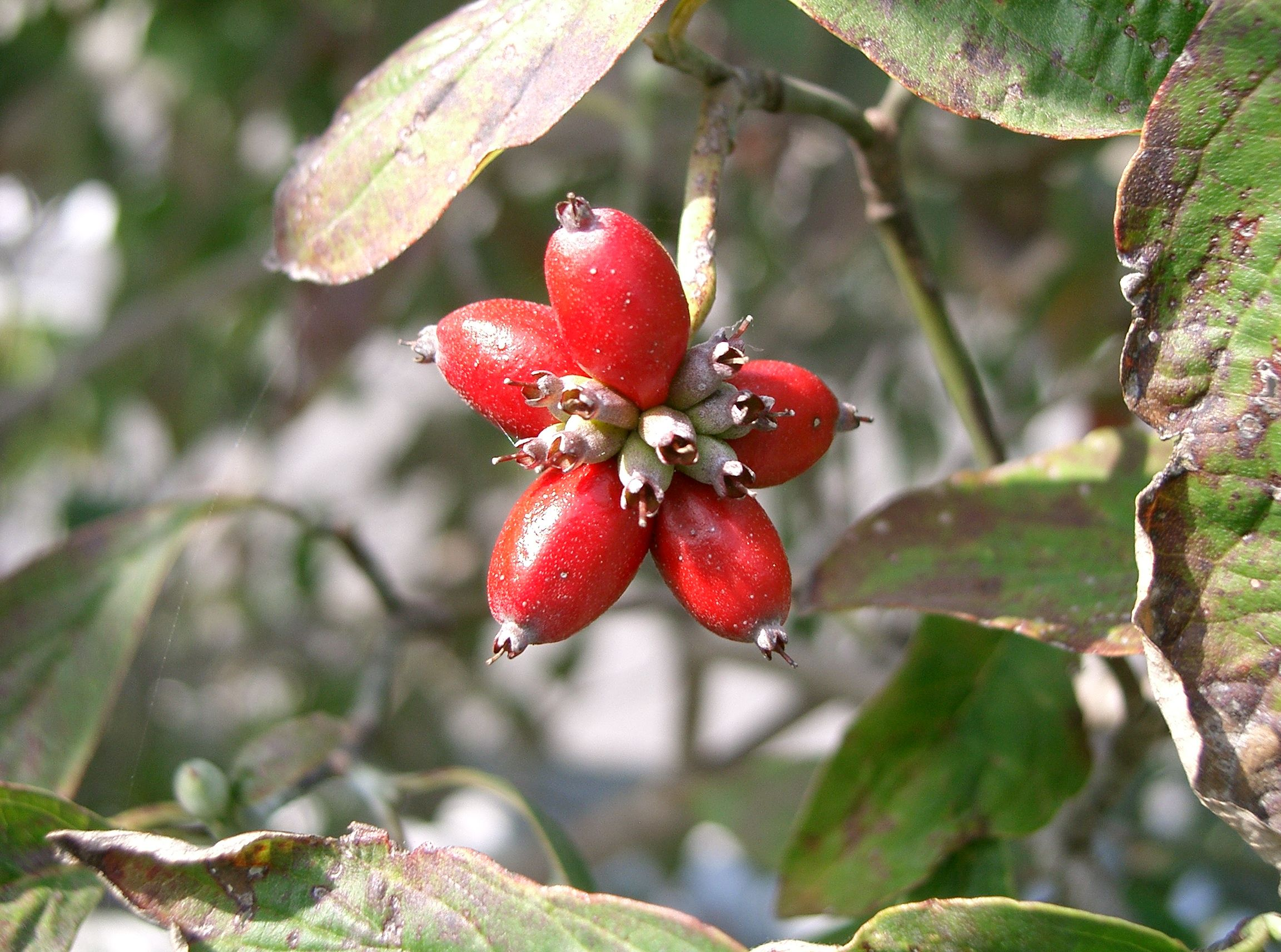
Fruits

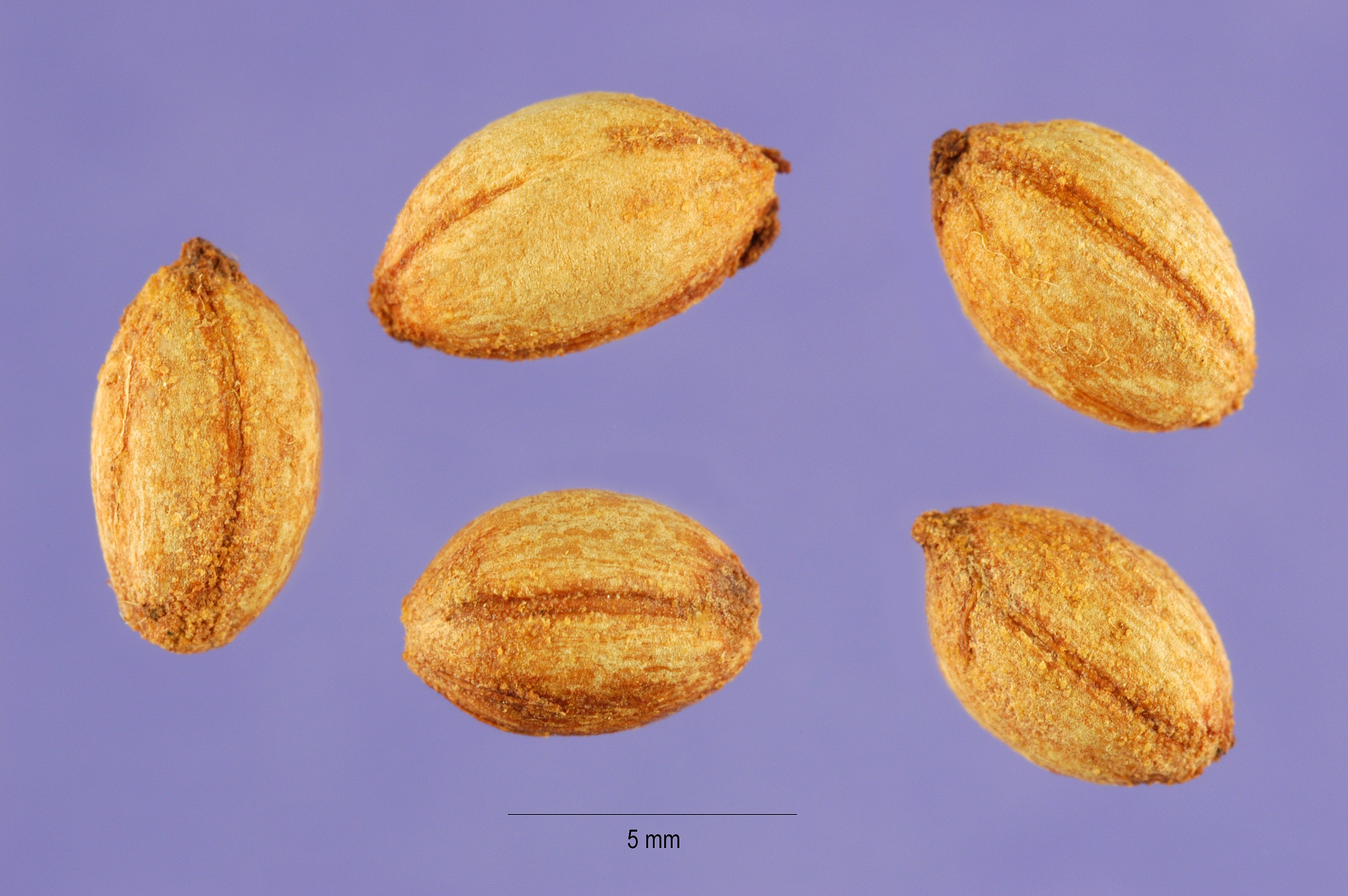
Seeds

== Taxonomy ==
The flowering dogwood is usually included in the dogwood genus Cornus as Cornus florida L., although it is sometimes treated in a separate genus as Benthamidia florida (L.) Spach. Less common names for C. florida include American dogwood, Florida dogwood, Indian arrowwood, Cornelian tree, white cornel, white dogwood, false box, and false boxwood.

Two subspecies are generally recognized:

Image	Scientific name	Distribution
	Cornus florida subsp. florida	Eastern and south-central United States.
	Cornus florida subsp. urbiniana (Rose) Rickett	Northeastern Mexico (Nuevo León, Veracruz).

== Ecology ==
=== Habitat ===
The flowering dogwood can grow in a range of habitats from moist to dry forests to wetlands, often found in the understories of these communities. They are tolerant of seasonal dry periods, but not tolerant of severe drought or saturated soils. Additionally, they are sensitive to rapid changes in soil temperatures and prefer the moderated temperatures of woodland soils.

=== Diseases ===
Dogwood anthracnose caused by the fungi Discula destructiva has caused severe mortality of dogwoods. In regions where dogwood anthracnose is a problem, homeowners and public land managers are encouraged to know the symptoms and inspect trees frequently. The selection of healthy, disease-free planting stock is essential and transplanting trees from the forest, particularly from mountain forests, should be avoided. Species of Phytophthora cause root rot.

Wood boring insects also affect the health of flowering dogwoods. Dogwood borer larvae tunnel through openings in the bark to feed, destroying the cambium. Ambrosia beetles can invade young twigs by burrowing through the pith and leaving ambrosia fungi for their larvae to feed on. Dogwood club-gall midge larvae can also invade twigs, causing them to swell at the base; heavy infestations can stunt growth.

== Conservation ==
C. florida is listed as threatened by the Vermont Department of Fish and Wildlife Nongame and Natural Heritage Program, exploitably vulnerable by the New York Department of Environmental Conservation, Division of Land and Forests, and endangered by the Maine Department of Conservation Natural Areas Program

== Cultivation ==
Flowering dogwood does best horticulturally in moist, acidic soil in a site with some afternoon shade, but good morning sun. It does not do well when exposed to intense heat sources such as adjacent parking lots or air conditioning compressors. It also has a low salinity tolerance. The hardiness zone is 5–9 and the preferred pH is between 6.0 and 7.0. In urban and suburban settings, care should be taken not to inflict mower damage on the trunk or roots, as this increases the tree's susceptibility to disease and pest pressure. The common flowering dogwood has been placed on the endangered species list in Ontario. Sites should be selected for reasonably well-drained, fertile soils; full sun is recommended in high-hazard areas (such as stream or pond banks). New plantings should be mulched to a depth of 5 to 10 cm (2 to 4 in), avoiding the stem. Dead wood and leaves should be pruned and completely removed and destroyed yearly. Plants should be watered weekly during droughts, with watering done in the morning, avoiding wetting the foliage. Registered fungicides can be applied when necessary, according to manufacturers instructions and advice of local Extension Service.

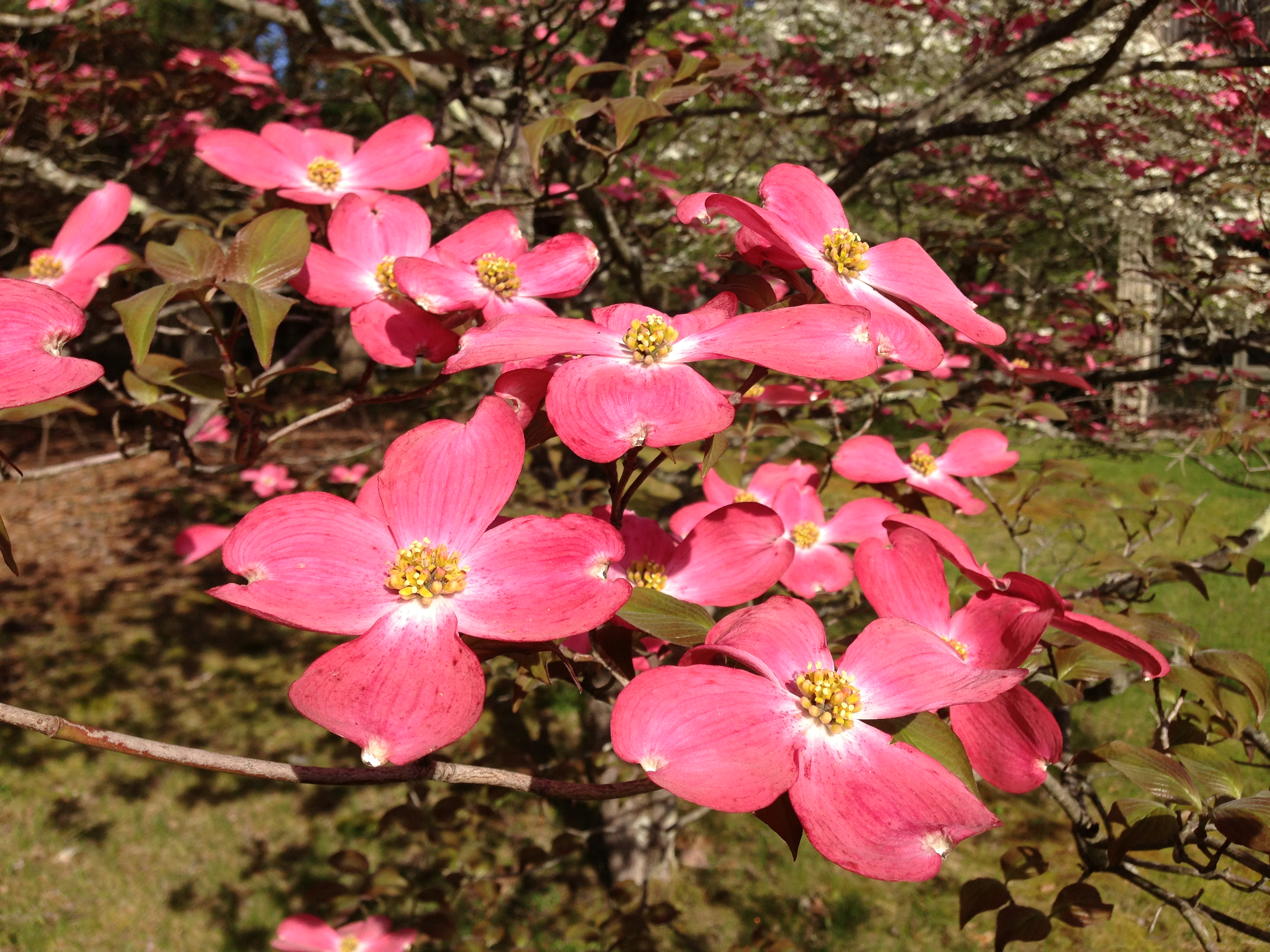
Pink variety flower clusters

Flowering dogwood is grown widely throughout the temperate world.

Selected cultivars

- 'Amerika Touch-O-Pink' – large bracts, tinged pink; large leaves; good disease resistance.
- 'Appalachian Spring' – large white bracts; red fall foliage; resistant to dogwood anthracnose.
- 'Autumn Gold' – white bracts; yellow fall color.
- 'Barton' – large white bracts; blooms at early age; resistant to stem canker and powdery mildew.
- 'Bay Beauty' – double white bracts; resists heat and drought; good for Deep South.
- 'Cherokee Daybreak' – white bract; vigorous grower with variegated leaves.
- 'Cherokee Chief' – red bracts; red new growth.
- 'Cherokee Brave' – Even redder than 'Cherokee Chief', smaller bracts but dark red color; consistently resistant to powdery mildew.
- 'Cherokee Princess' – vigorous white bracts, industry standard for white flowers.
- 'Cherokee Sunset' – purplish-red bracts; variegated foliage.
- 'Gulf Coast Pink' – best pink flowering dogwood in Florida – northern part only.
- 'Hohman's Gold' – white bracts; variegated foliage.
- 'Jean's Appalachian Snow' – large, overlapping white bracts w/ green flowers; very resistant to powdery mildew.
- 'Karen's Appalachian Blush' – delicate white bracts edged in pink; some powdery mildew resistance.
- 'Kay's Appalachian Mist' – stiff, creamy white bracts; red fall foliage; good resistance to powdery mildew.
- 'Plena' – double white bracts; spot anthracnose-resistant.
- 'Purple Glory' – red bracts; purple foliage; spot anthracnose-resistant but susceptible to stem canker.
- 'Weaver White' – large white blooms; large leaves; candelabra shape; good in north-central Florida.

=== Propagation ===
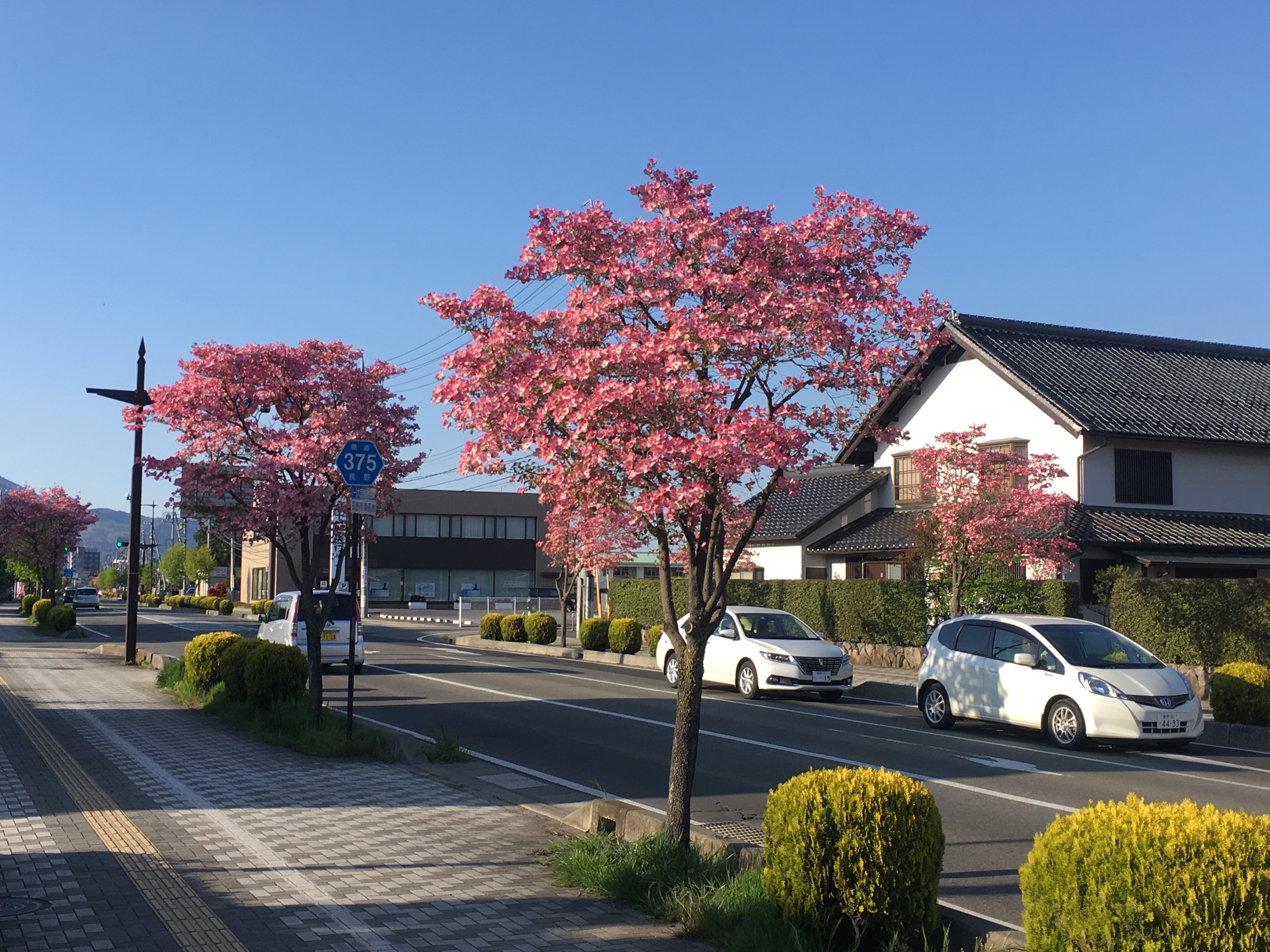
Dogwood trees in Nagano, Japan

Cornus florida is easily propagated by seeds, which are sown in the fall into prepared rows of sawdust or sand, and emerge in the spring. Germination rates for good clean seed should be near 100% if seed dormancy is first overcome by cold stratification treatments for 90 to 120 days at 4 °C (39 °F). Flowering dogwood demonstrates gametophytic self-incompatibility, meaning that the plants cannot self-fertilize. This is important for breeding programs as it means that it is not necessary to emasculate (remove the anthers from) C. florida flowers before making controlled cross-pollinations. These pollinations should be repeated every other day, as the flowers must be cross-pollinated within one or two days of opening for pollinations to be effective.

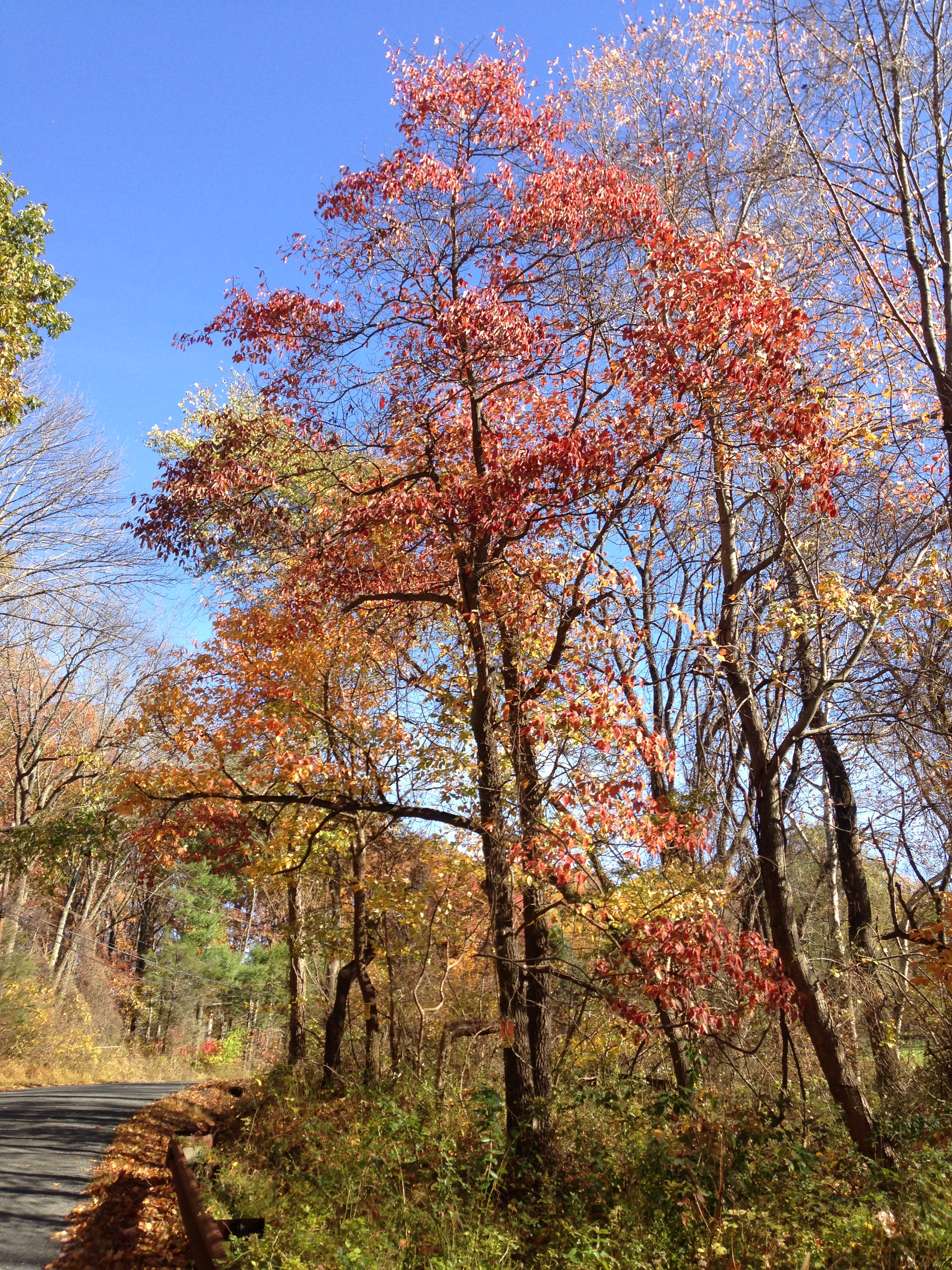
Tree in the wild in autumn

Softwood cuttings taken in late spring or early summer from new growth can be rooted under mist if treated with 8,000 to 10,000 ppm indole-3-butyric acid (IBA). In cold climates, potted cuttings must be kept in heated cold frames or polyhouses the following winter to maintain temperatures between 0 and 7 °C (32 and 45 °F). Although rooting success can be as high as 50–85%, this technique is not commonly used by commercial growers. Rather, selected cultivars are generally propagated by T-budding in late summer or by whip grafting in the greenhouse in winter onto seedling rootstock.

Micropropagation of flowering dogwood is now used in breeding programs aiming to incorporate resistance to dogwood anthracnose and powdery mildew into horticulturally and economically important cultivars. Nodal (axillary bud) sections are established in a culture of Woody Plant Medium (WPM) amended with 4.4 μmol/L 6-Benzyladenine (BA) to promote shoot growth. Rooting of up to 83% can be obtained when 5–7 week-old microshoots are then transferred to WPM amended with 4.9 μmol/L IBA.

== Uses ==
For humans, the fruit is poisonous. The Houma people of modern Louisiana and Mississippi used scrapings from the bark or roots in a remedy for malaria. Compounds isolated from the bark have shown moderate antiplasmodial and antileishmanial activity in lab experiments, partly supporting its use as a quinine substitute. Many Native American groups also used the root bark as a fever reducer, a pain reliever, an antidiarrheal, and a skin astringent. The bark itself was used for headaches and backaches, a throat aid, and as an infusion for diseases such as measles. The flowers were used for colic pain relief and as a fever reducer. The species has been used in the production of inks and scarlet dyes. The hard, dense wood has been used for products such as golf club heads, mallets, wooden rake teeth, tool handles, jeweler's boxes and butcher's blocks. It was used to treat dogs with mange, which may be how it got its name. The red berries are not edible, despite some rumors otherwise.

Cornus florida can be used in restoration projects for urban areas and abandoned strip mines. It is a soil improver, as the leaf litter decomposes faster than most of the species with which it is associated.

== In culture ==
Cornus florida is the state tree and flower of Virginia, the state tree of Missouri, and state flower of North Carolina. It gained recognition as the state tree and flower of Virginia in the movie The American President.

In 1915, 40 dogwood saplings were donated by the U.S. to Japan in the 1912–1915 exchange of flowers between Tokyo and Washington, D.C. While the cherry blossom trees survived the ensuing sour relations of these two countries and are the main feature of the National Cherry Blossom Festival, all dogwood trees in Tokyo died except the one that had been planted in an agriculture high school. In 2012, the U.S. sent 3,000 dogwood saplings to Japan to commemorate the 100th anniversary of the Washington, D.C., cherry trees given as a gift to the U.S. by Japan in 1912.
