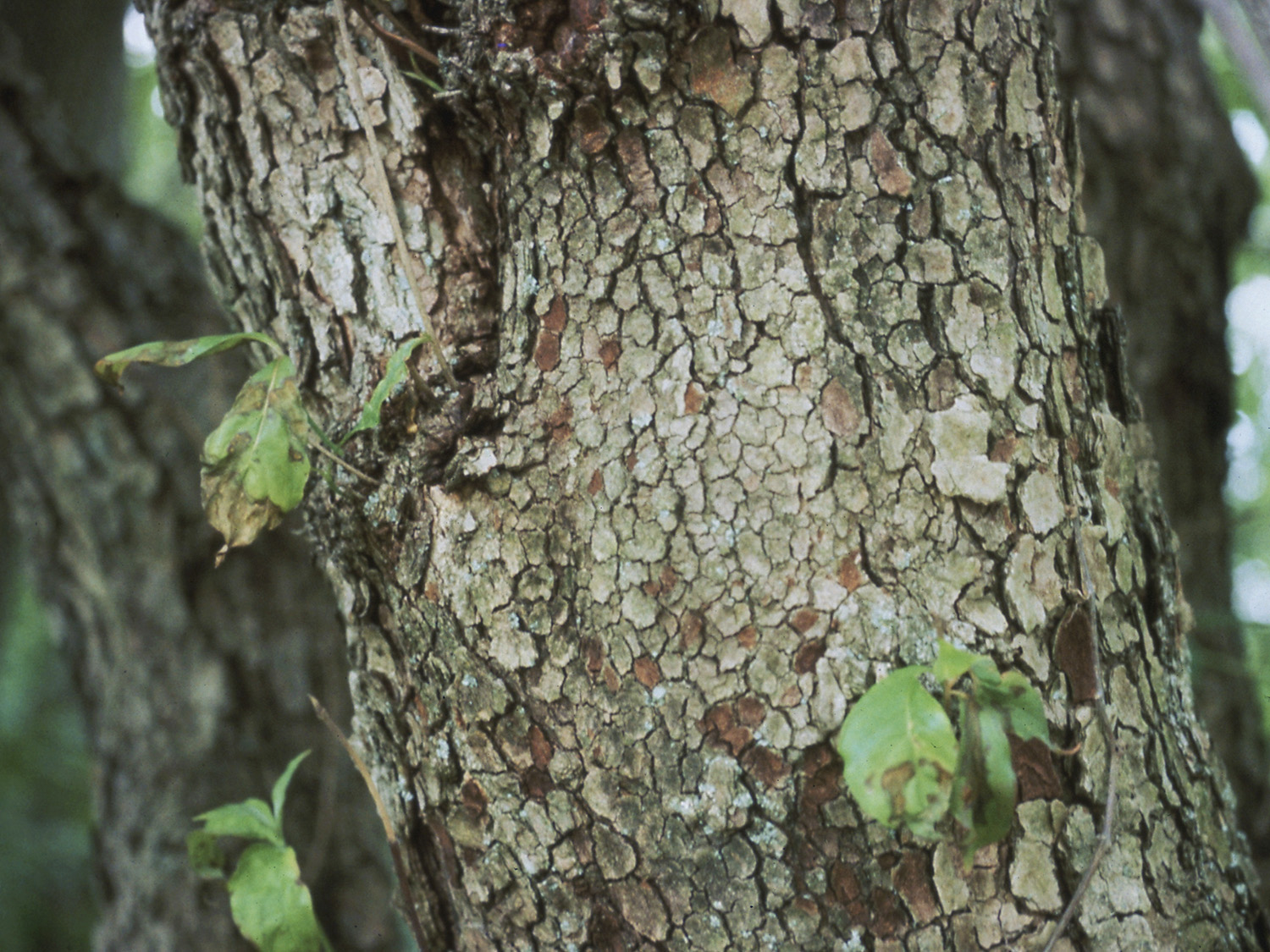
- Dogwood anthracnose (D. destructiva) can cause leaf blotches and increased sprouting of leaves from the trunk of the flowering dogwood tree

Scientific classification
- Kingdom: Fungi
- Division: Ascomycota
- Class: Sordariomycetes
- Order: Diaporthales
- Family: Gnomoniaceae
- Genus: Discula
- Species: D. destructiva

Binomial name
- Discula destructiva Redlin

= Discula destructiva =

Species of fungus

Discula destructiva is a fungus in the family Gnomoniaceae which causes dogwood anthracnose, affecting populations of dogwood trees native to North America.

It was introduced to the United States in 1978 and is distributed throughout the Eastern United States and the Pacific Northwest. Its origins are unknown. It typically occurs in cool, wet spring and fall weather. One can avoid this fungus by watering dogwoods during drought and general cultural control care.

Species affected: Cornus florida and Cornus nuttallii.
