= Burrknot =

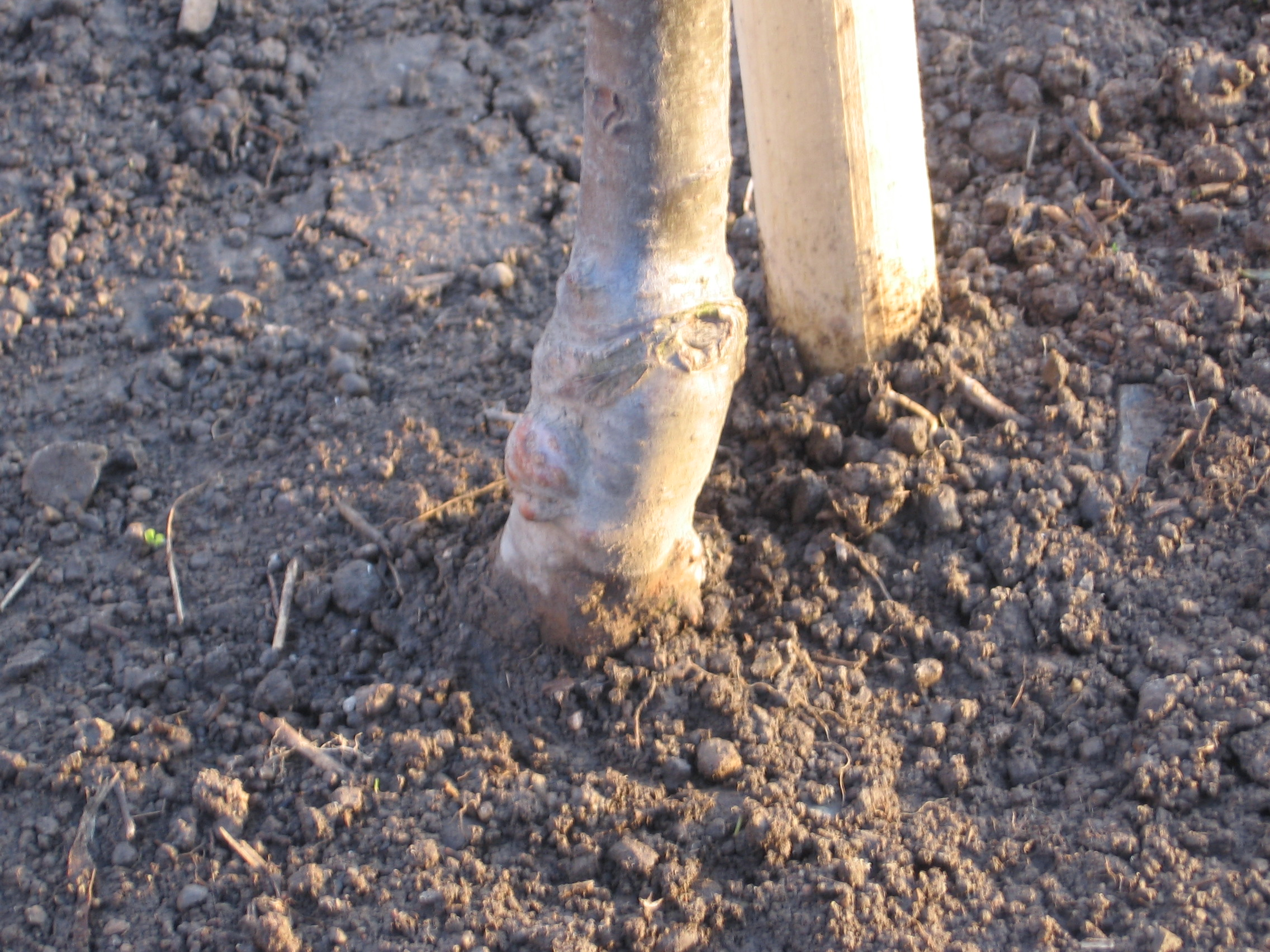
Burrknot on apple tree A2 rootstock, after plantation, side view

Burrknot is a tree disorder caused by the formation of adventitious root primordia. Although previously classified as disease, it is now classified as a disorder, as it is no longer believed to be pathogenic.

It first looks like a smooth orange bulge growing from the stem or a branch. Later, multiple adventitious roots form.

== Description ==
The occurrence of Burrknot is quite common among rootstock, often found on apple tree M ( Malling ) and MM ( Malling-Merton ) rootstocks. At onset it begins to look like a smooth orange bulge growing from the stem or a branch, later, during one to three years, multiple adventitious roots begin to form.

When located on the roots, it is not considered to be very dangerous, but it makes it easier for diseases to infect the tree, and leaves it more susceptible to insects. When many burrknots are present on various location in the tree, it can make the tree unproductive.

== Treatment ==
It is recommended to protect trees from moisture and shadow at the burrknot location, and to prevent infestation by Synanthedon myopaeformis.

== Similar diseases and disorders ==
A disease somewhat similar in appearance is a crown gall.
