= Mastixia pentandra subsp. scortechinii =

Scientific classification
- Kingdom: Plantae
- Clade: Tracheophytes
- Clade: Angiosperms
- Clade: Eudicots
- Clade: Asterids
- Order: Cornales
- Family: Nyssaceae
- Genus: Mastixia
- Species: M. pentandra
- Subspecies: M. p. subsp. scortechinii

Trinomial name
- Mastixia pentandra subsp. scortechinii (King) K.M.Matthew

Synonyms
- Mastixia megacarpa Ridl.; Mastixia parvifolia Hallier f.; Mastixia scortechinii King

Subspecies of tree

Mastixia pentandra subsp. scortechinii is a subspecies of Mastixia pentandra. It is a tree in the family Nyssaceae. It is named for the botanist Benedetto Scortechini.

== Description ==
Mastixia pentandra subsp. scortechinii grows as a tree measuring up to 40 metres (130 ft) tall with a trunk diameter of up to 80 centimetres (30 in). The fissured bark is grey-brown. The flowers are greenish or yellowish white. The ovoid to oblong fruits are green, ripening purple to bluish black, and measure up to 3.5 cm (1 in) long.

== Distribution and habitat ==
Mastixia pentandra subsp. scortechinii grows naturally in Thailand, Sumatra, Peninsular Malaysia, Borneo and Sulawesi. Its habitat is lowland to submontane forests from sea-level to 1,500 metres (5,000 ft) altitude.
