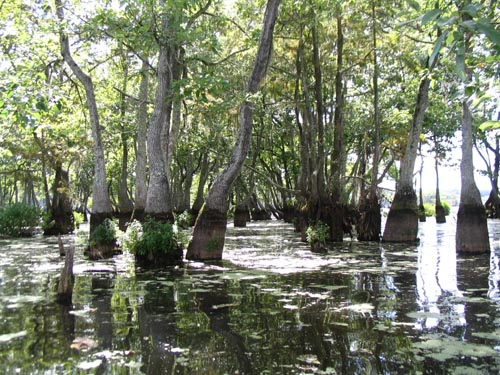
- A stand of Nyssa aquatica (water tupelo)

Conservation status
- Least Concern (IUCN 3.1)

Scientific classification
- Kingdom: Plantae
- Clade: Tracheophytes
- Clade: Angiosperms
- Clade: Eudicots
- Clade: Asterids
- Order: Cornales
- Family: Nyssaceae
- Genus: Nyssa
- Species: N. aquatica

Binomial name
- Nyssa aquatica L.
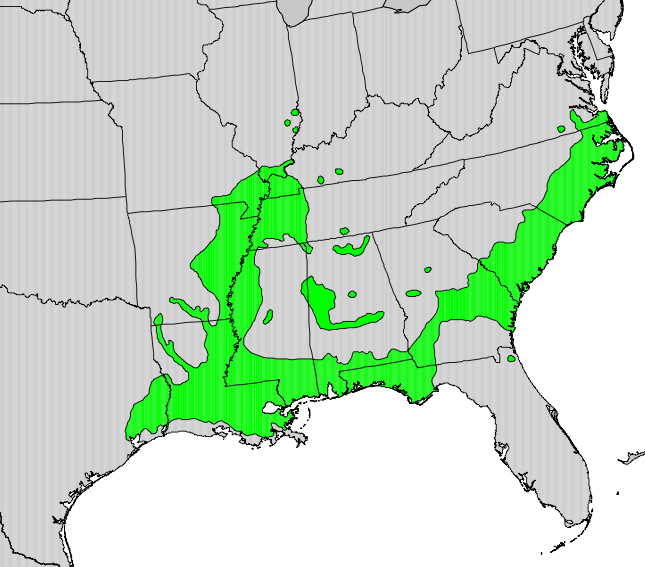
- Natural range

= Nyssa aquatica =

Species of aquatic plant

Nyssa aquatica, commonly called the water tupelo, cottongum, wild olive, large tupelo, tupelo-gum, or water-gum, is a large, long-lived tree in the tupelo family, Nyssaceae, that grows in swamps and floodplains in the Southeastern United States.

Nyssa aquatica trunks have a swollen base that tapers up to a long, clear bole, and its root system is periodically underwater. Water tupelo trees often occur in pure stands.

== Names ==
Nyssa aquatica's genus name (Nyssa) refers to a Greek water nymph; the species epithet aquatica, meaning 'aquatic', refers to its swamp and wetland habitat.

One of the species' common names, tupelo, is of Native American origin, coming from the Creek words ito 'tree' and opilwa 'swamp'; it was in use by the mid-18th century

== Description ==
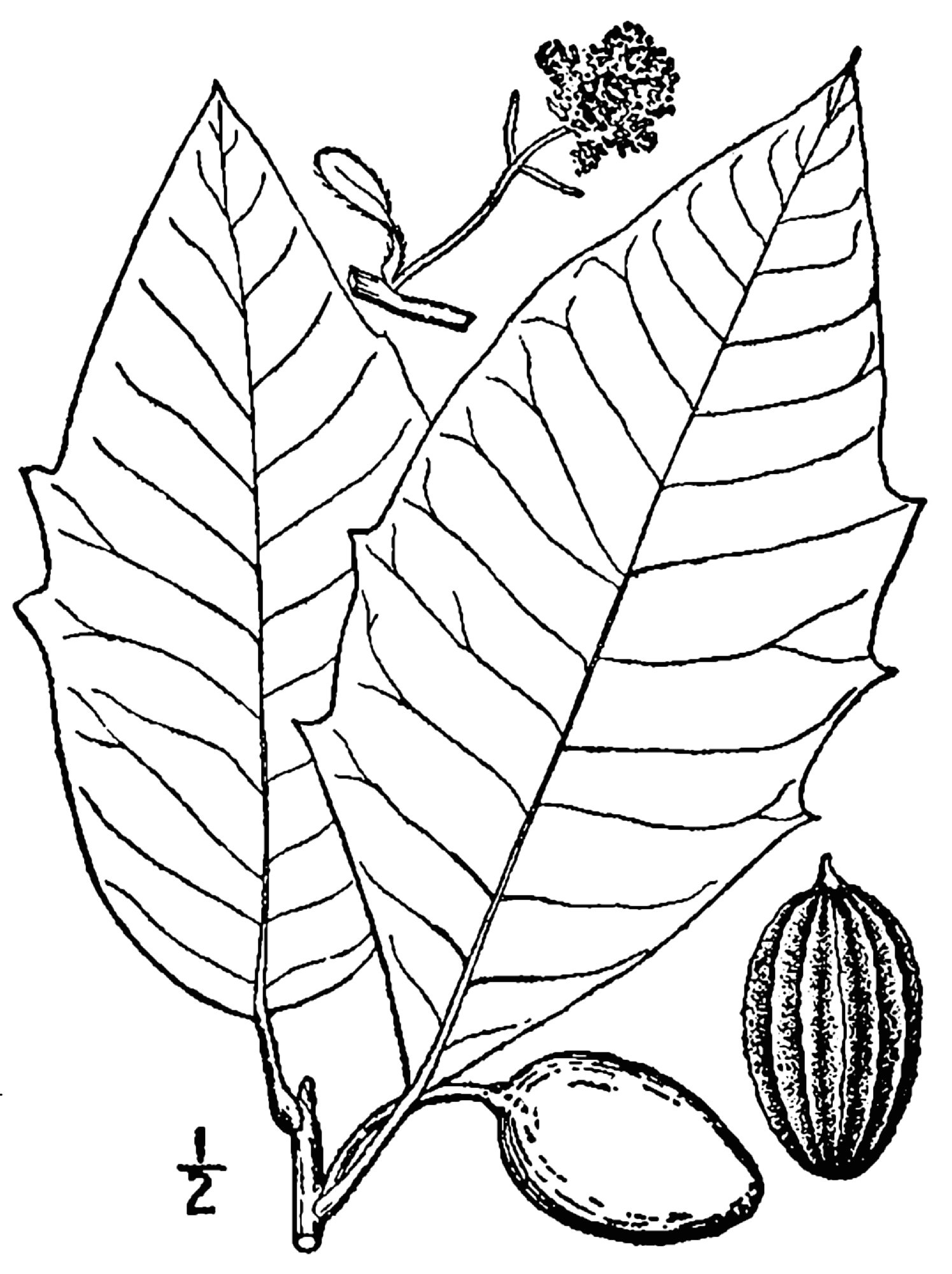
Nyssa aquatica foliage

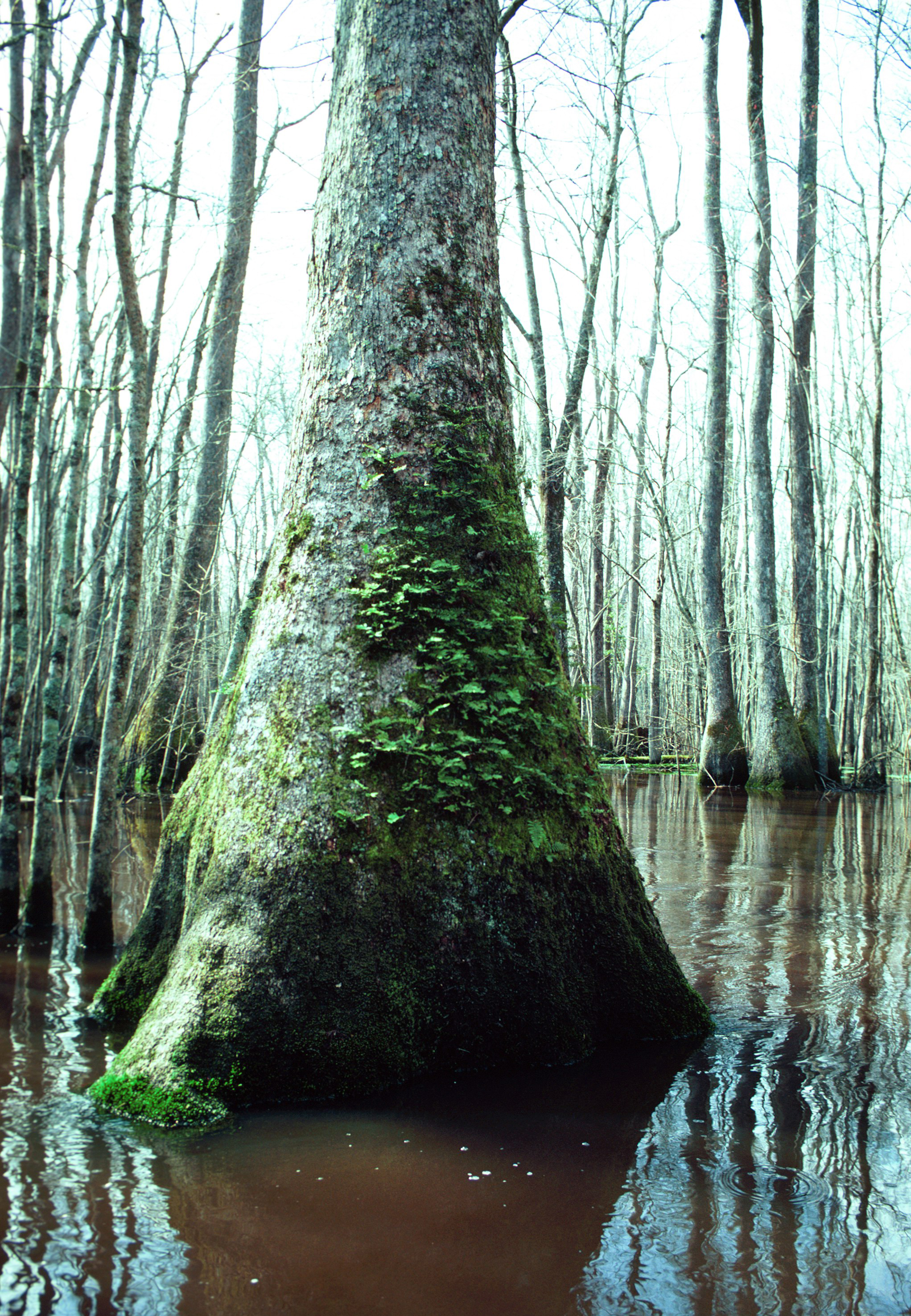
Swollen trunk base, in swamp habitat

Male flowers are borne in clustered inflorescences, while female flowers and bisexual flowers arise individually or as pairs. It is distinguished in part from Nyssa ogeche by typically having longer leaf petioles. It has 1-inch-long (2.5 cm) fruits, longer than those of Nyssa sylvatica, that are borne on 1.2-inch (3 cm) extended peduncles.

== Uses ==
A large mature tree can produce commercial timber used for furniture and crates. The swollen base of the Nyssa aquatica is the source of a favored wood of wood carvers.

Many kinds of wildlife eat the fruit, and it is a favored honey tree.

The largest water tupelo tree specimens, according to the 2021 National Register of Champion Trees, are located in Greensville County, Virginia and White County, Arkansas. According to American Forests' champion trees official register, these trees have trunk circumferences of 46.9 feet and 37.6 feet, heights of 108 feet and 125 feet and crown spreads of 53 feet and 92.5 feet, respectively.

== Gallery ==
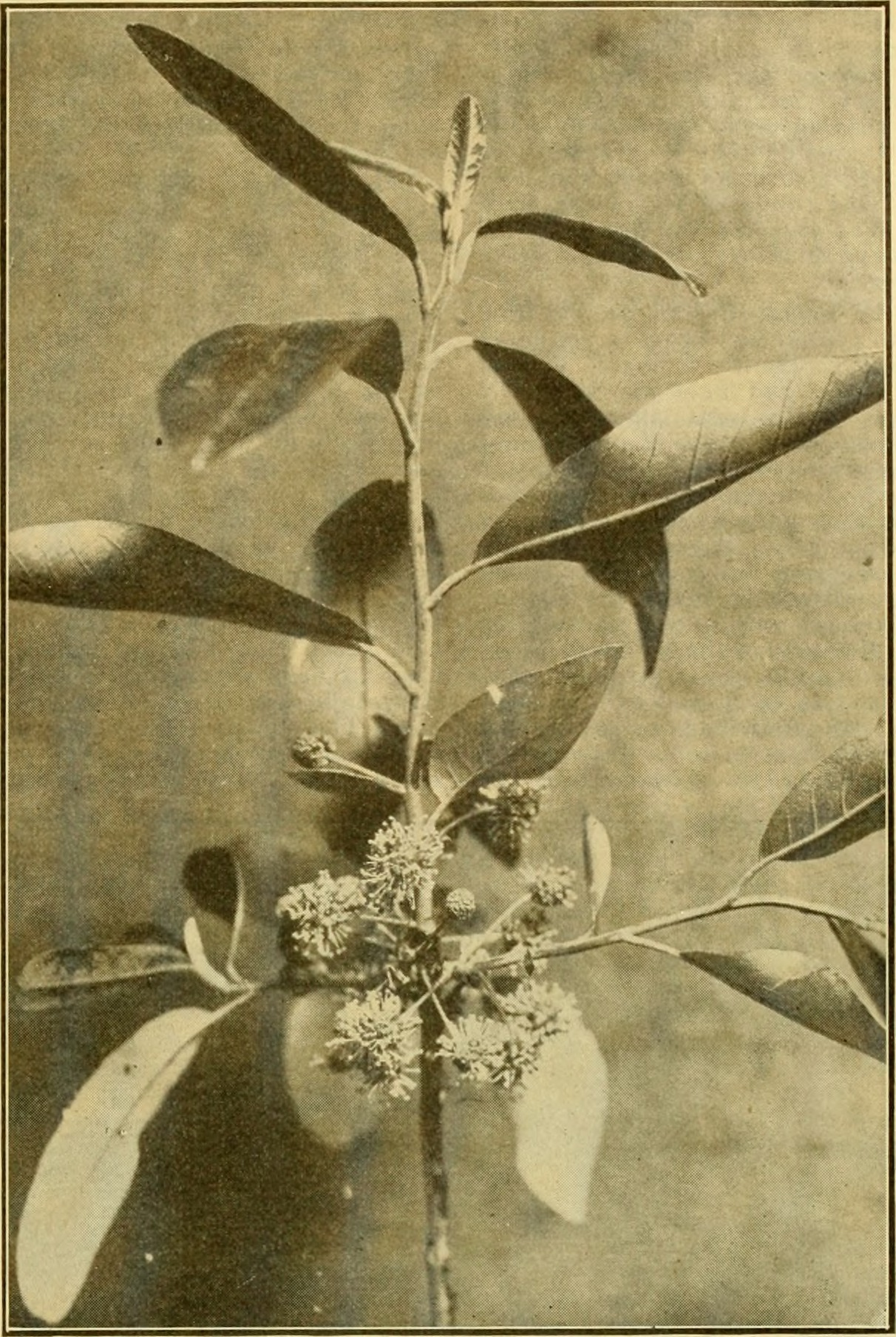
Branch with inflorescences

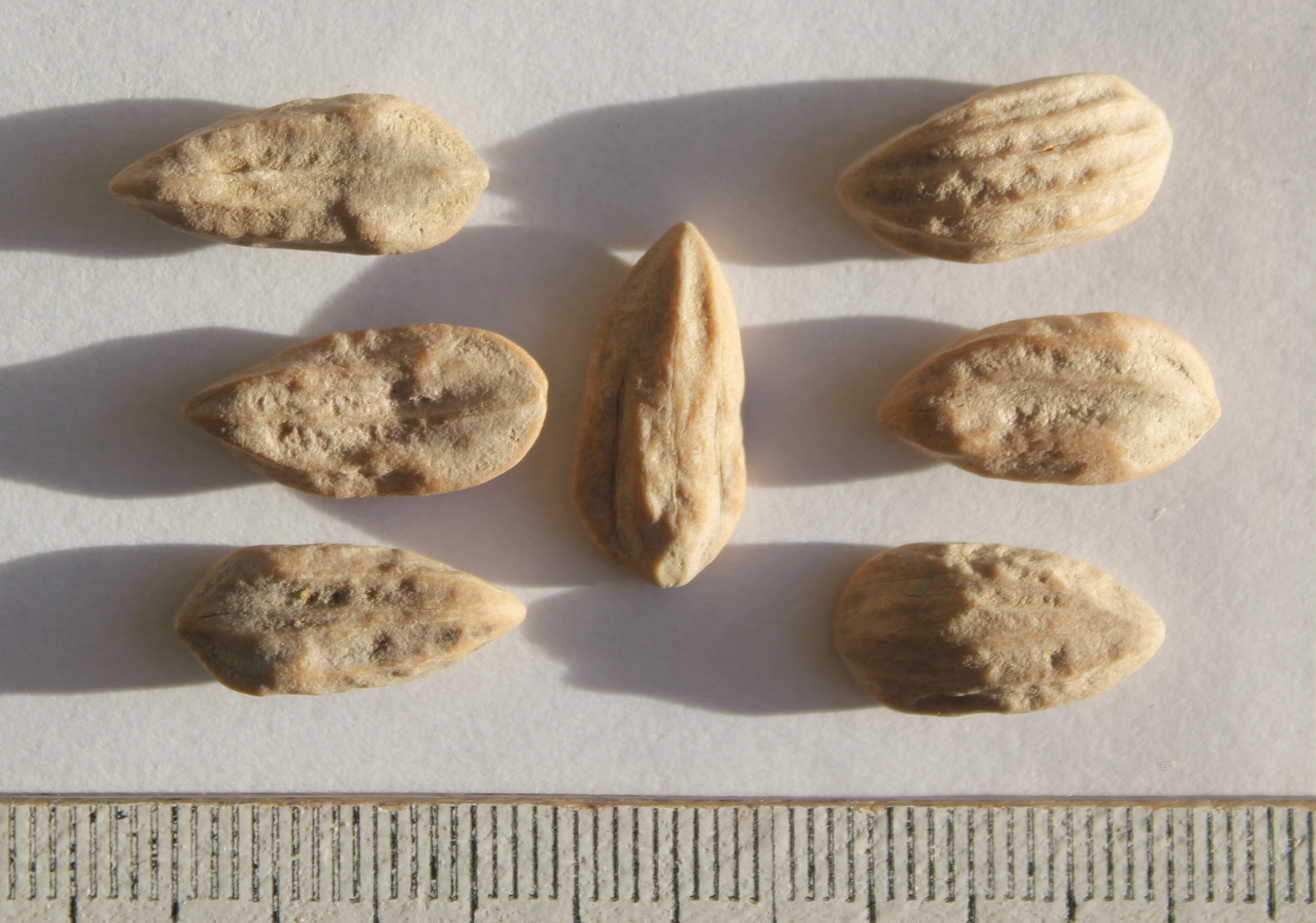
Seeds
