= Mastixia glauca =

Conservation status
- Vulnerable (IUCN 2.3)

Scientific classification
- Kingdom: Plantae
- Clade: Tracheophytes
- Clade: Angiosperms
- Clade: Eudicots
- Clade: Asterids
- Order: Cornales
- Family: Nyssaceae
- Genus: Mastixia
- Species: M. glauca

Binomial name
- Mastixia glauca K.M.Matthew

Species of tree

Mastixia glauca is a tree in the family Nyssaceae. The specific epithet glauca is from the Greek meaning "bluish-grey", referring to the colour of the leaf underside.

== Description ==
Mastixia glauca grows as a tree measuring up to 15 metres (50 ft) tall with a trunk diameter of up to 25 centimetres (10 in). The pale green fruits are oblong-ovoid and measure up to 4 cm (2 in) long.

== Distribution and habitat ==
Mastixia glauca is endemic to Borneo and confined to Malaysia's Sarawak state where it is known only from Mount Santubong. Its habitat is mixed dipterocarp forests at around 100 metres (300 ft) altitude.
