= Mastixia macrocarpa =

Conservation status
- Vulnerable (IUCN 2.3)

Scientific classification
- Kingdom: Plantae
- Clade: Tracheophytes
- Clade: Angiosperms
- Clade: Eudicots
- Clade: Asterids
- Order: Cornales
- Family: Nyssaceae
- Genus: Mastixia
- Species: M. macrocarpa

Binomial name
- Mastixia macrocarpa K.M.Matthew

Species of tree

Mastixia macrocarpa is a tree in the family Nyssaceae. The specific epithet macrocarpa is from the Greek meaning "large fruit".

== Description ==
Mastixia macrocarpa grows as a tree measuring up to 20 metres (70 ft) tall with a trunk diameter of up to 20 centimetres (8 in). The pale green fruits are oblong-ovoid and measure up to 4 cm (2 in) long.

== Distribution and habitat ==
Mastixia macrocarpa grows naturally in Malaysia's Sarawak state and the Philippines' Luzon island. Its habitat is mixed dipterocarp forests at around 75 metres (200 ft) altitude.
