= Mastixia eugenioides =

Scientific classification
- Kingdom: Plantae
- Clade: Tracheophytes
- Clade: Angiosperms
- Clade: Eudicots
- Clade: Asterids
- Order: Cornales
- Family: Nyssaceae
- Genus: Mastixia
- Species: M. eugenioides

Binomial name
- Mastixia eugenioides K.M.Matthew

Species of tree

Mastixia eugenioides is a tree in the family Nyssaceae. The specific epithet eugenioides is from the Latin and refers to the resemblance of the leaves to those of the genus Eugenia.

== Description ==
Mastixia eugenioides grows as a tree measuring up to 30 metres (100 ft) tall with a trunk diameter of up to 30 centimetres (10 in). The smooth bark is greyish to yellowish brown. The ovoid to oblong fruits are green, ripening purple, and measure up to 2.5 cm (1 in) long.

== Distribution and habitat ==
Mastixia eugenioides is endemic to Borneo. Its habitat is mixed dipterocarp forests from sea-level to 1,200 metres (4,000 ft) altitude.
