= Mastixia rostrata subsp. caudatifolia =

Scientific classification
- Kingdom: Plantae
- Clade: Tracheophytes
- Clade: Angiosperms
- Clade: Eudicots
- Clade: Asterids
- Order: Cornales
- Family: Nyssaceae
- Genus: Mastixia
- Species: M. rostrata
- Subspecies: M. r. subsp. caudatifolia

Trinomial name
- Mastixia rostrata subsp. caudatifolia (Merr.) K.M.Matthew

Synonyms
- Mastixia caudatifolia Merr.; Mastixia margarethae Wangerin

Subspecies of tree

Mastixia rostrata subsp. caudatifolia is a subspecies of Mastixia rostrata. It is a tree in the family Nyssaceae. The infraspecific epithet caudatifolia is from the Latin meaning 'tapered leaf'.

== Description ==
Mastixia rostrata subsp. caudatifolia grows as a tree measuring up to 30 metres (100 ft) tall with a trunk diameter of up to 50 centimetres (20 in). The generally smooth bark is greyish to brown. The flowers are green-yellow. The ovoid to oblong fruits measure up to 2.2 cm (1 in) long.

== Distribution and habitat ==
Mastixia rostrata subsp. caudatifolia grows naturally in Sumatra, Peninsular Malaysia and Borneo. Its habitat is mixed dipterocarp forest from sea-level to 1,600 metres (5,200 ft) altitude.
