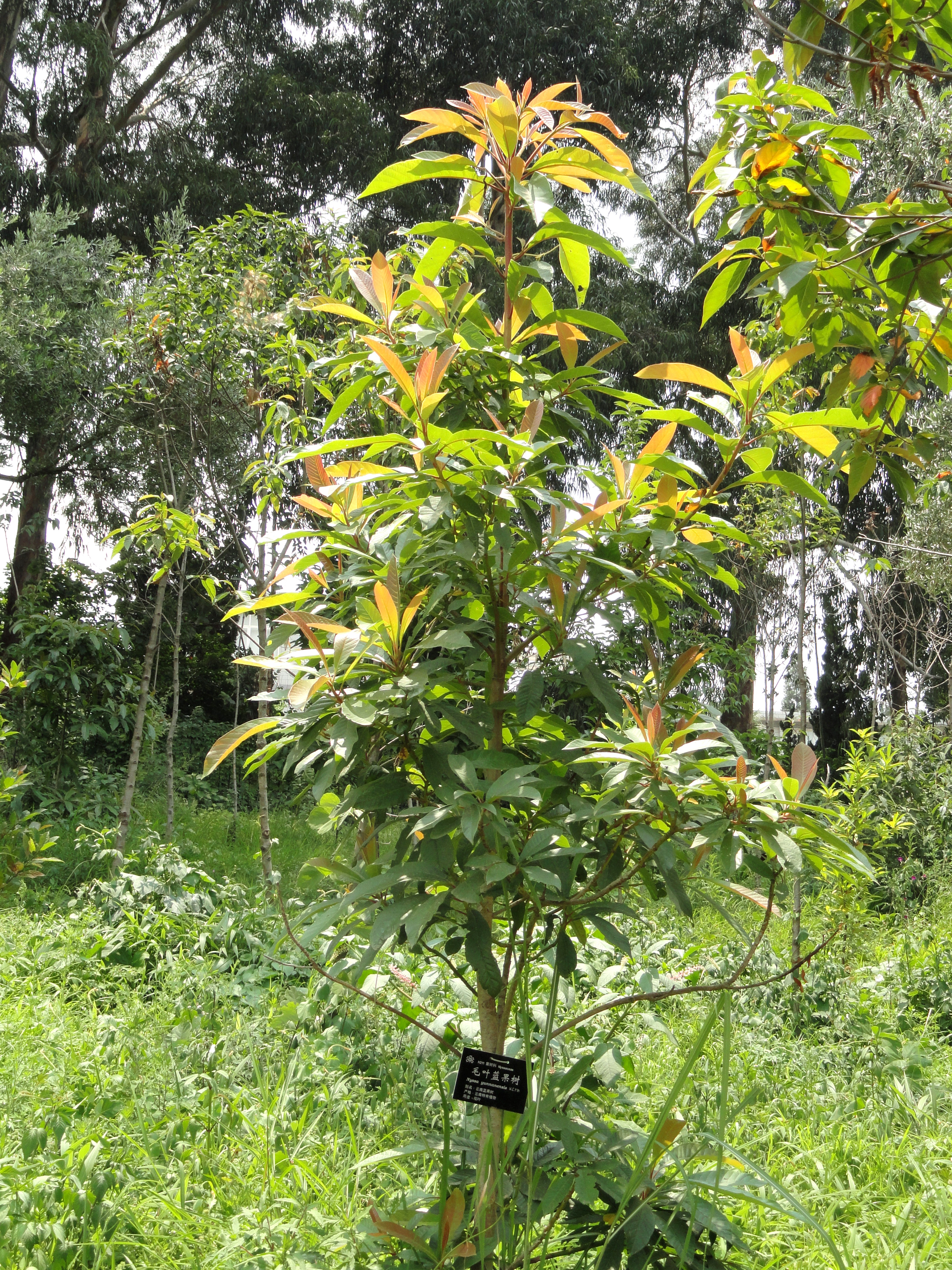

Conservation status
- Critically Endangered (IUCN 2.3)

Scientific classification
- Kingdom: Plantae
- Clade: Tracheophytes
- Clade: Angiosperms
- Clade: Eudicots
- Clade: Asterids
- Order: Cornales
- Family: Nyssaceae
- Genus: Nyssa
- Species: N. yunnanensis

Binomial name
- Nyssa yunnanensis W.C. Yin

= Nyssa yunnanensis =

Species of tree

Nyssa yunnanensis is a species of tree in the Nyssa genus. It is a dioecious tree (meaning that it has distinct male and female individual organisms) reaching 25–30 m (82–98 ft) in height. This flowering canopy tree inhabits mountainous tropical bogs and marshes.

Because of habitat loss and logging, this species is critically endangered in the IUCN Red List of Threatened Species. It now exists only in the vicinity of Xishuangbanna, which is located in Jinghong County, Yunnan Province, China. Only eight individual trees and two populations have been found in the wild, and 1999 this species has been listed among China's national Class I protection species and also among 120 PSESP (Plant Species with Extremely Small Populations) in the Implementation Plan of Rescuing and Conserving China's Plant Species with Extremely Small Populations (PSESP) and as critically endangered in the Threatened Species List of China's Higher Plants. To facilitate future conservation biology studies a reference genome was sequenced, creating a 1475 Mb assembly with 39,803 protein-coding genes. DNA was collected from a voucher specimen from Ruili Botanical Garden and stored in the China National GeneBank herbarium.
