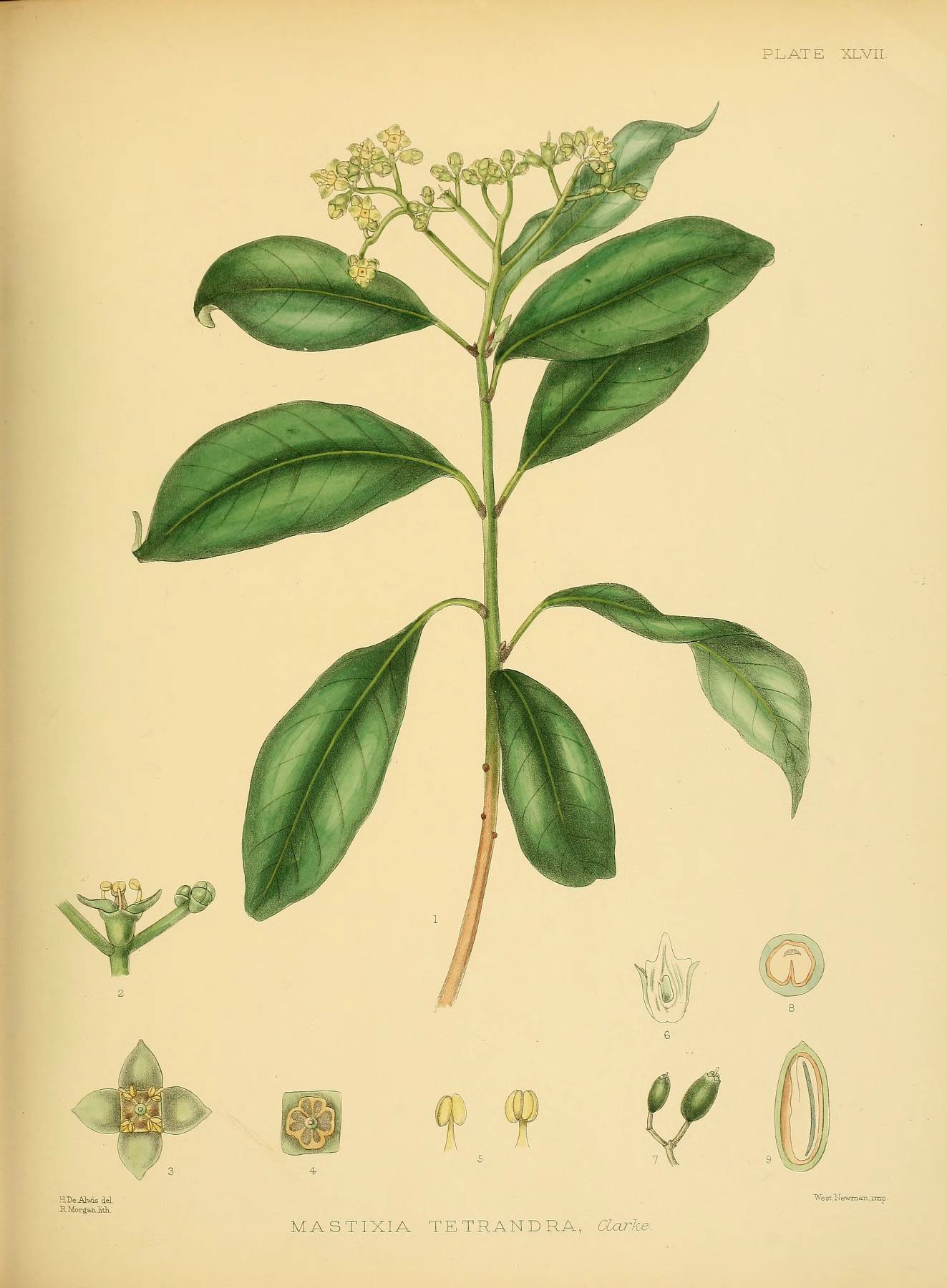

Conservation status
- Vulnerable (IUCN 2.3)

Scientific classification
- Kingdom: Plantae
- Clade: Tracheophytes
- Clade: Angiosperms
- Clade: Eudicots
- Clade: Asterids
- Order: Cornales
- Family: Nyssaceae
- Genus: Mastixia
- Species: M. tetrandra

Binomial name
- Mastixia tetrandra (Wight ex Thw.) C.B. Clarke

= Mastixia tetrandra =

Species of flowering plant

Mastixia tetrandra is a species of plant in the Nyssaceae family. It is endemic to Sri Lanka where it is known as දියතලිය (diyathaliya) by local people.
