= Mastixia trichotoma =

Scientific classification
- Kingdom: Plantae
- Clade: Tracheophytes
- Clade: Angiosperms
- Clade: Eudicots
- Clade: Asterids
- Order: Cornales
- Family: Nyssaceae
- Genus: Mastixia
- Species: M. trichotoma

Binomial name
- Mastixia trichotoma Blume

Varieties
- M. t. var. clarkeana; M. t. var. korthalsiana; M. t. var. maingayi; M. t. var. rhynchocarpa

Synonyms
- Mastixia acuminatissima Blume; Mastixia caesia Blume; Mastixia kimanilla Blume; Mastixia laxa Blume

Species of tree

Mastixia trichotoma is a tree in the family Nyssaceae. The specific epithet trichotoma is from the Greek meaning 'three parts', referring to the three-branched inflorescence.

== Description ==
Mastixia trichotoma grows as a tree measuring up to 40 metres (130 ft) tall with a trunk diameter of up to 50 centimetres (20 in). The smooth to fissured bark is yellowish grey to grey-brown. The flowers are green to yellowish green. The ovoid to ellipsoid fruits measure up to 3 cm (1 in) long.

== Distribution and habitat ==
Mastixia trichotoma grows naturally in the Andaman and Nicobar Islands, Thailand, Sumatra, Peninsular Malaysia, Java, Borneo, Sulawesi, the Moluccas and Mindanao. Its habitat is mixed dipterocarp forests from sea-level to 1,800 metres (6,000 ft) elevation.
