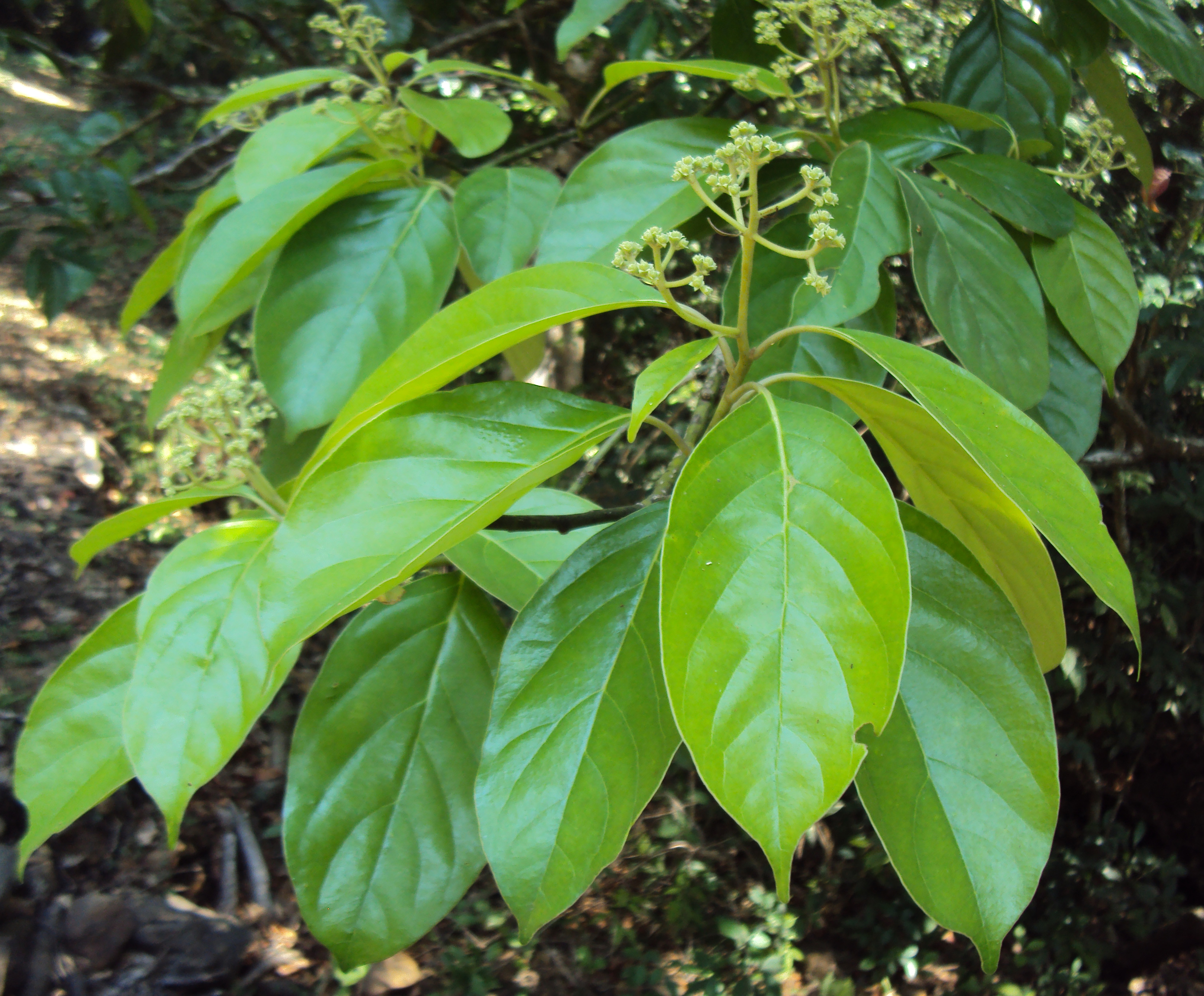
- Leaves and buds

Conservation status
- Least Concern (IUCN 2.3)

Scientific classification
- Kingdom: Plantae
- Clade: Tracheophytes
- Clade: Angiosperms
- Clade: Eudicots
- Clade: Asterids
- Order: Cornales
- Family: Nyssaceae
- Genus: Mastixia
- Species: M. arborea

Binomial name
- Mastixia arborea C.B.Clarke

= Mastixia arborea =

Species of flowering plant

Mastixia arborea is a species of plant in the Nyssaceae family. It is found in India and Sri Lanka.
