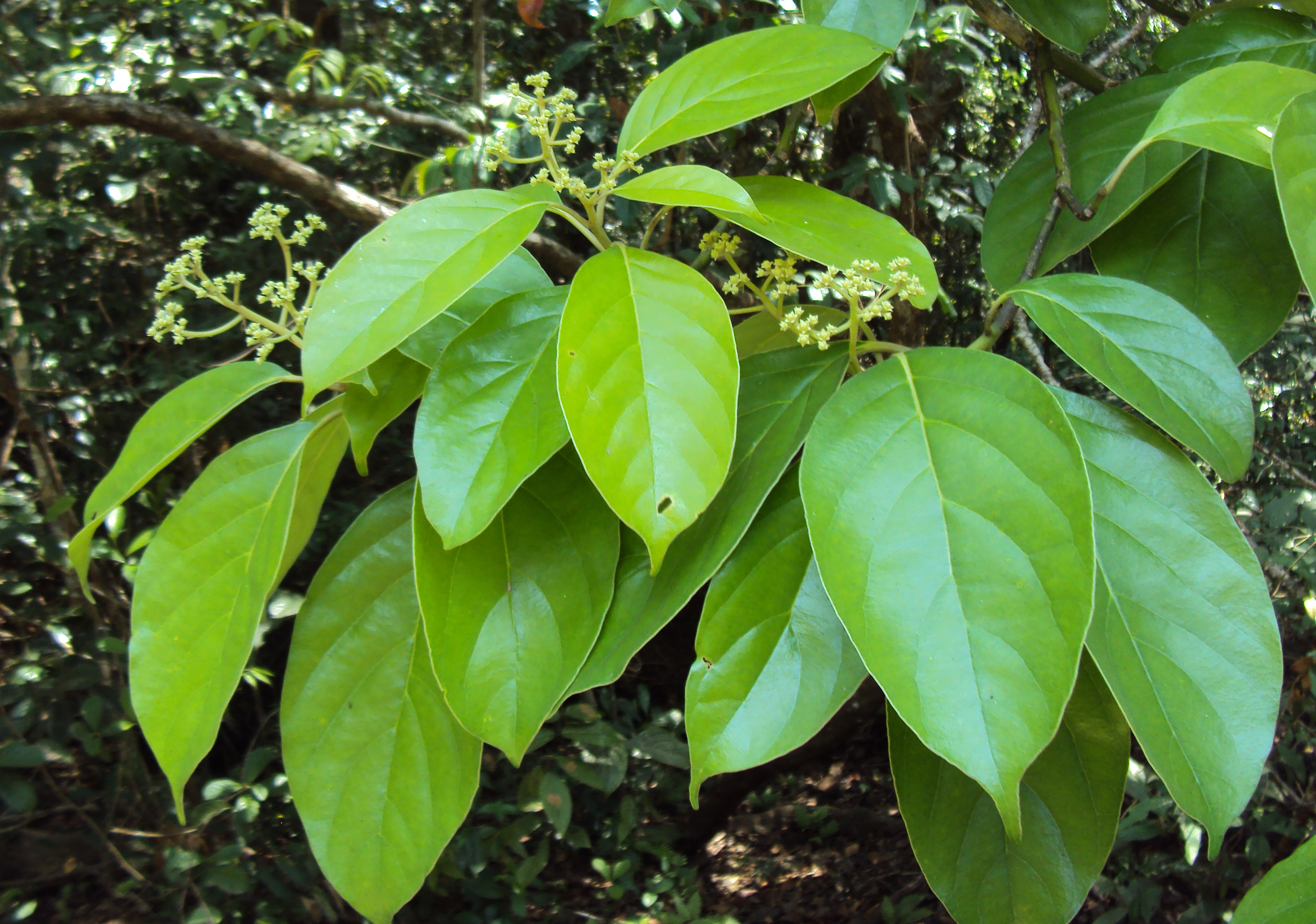
- Mastixia arborea

Scientific classification
- Kingdom: Plantae
- Clade: Tracheophytes
- Clade: Angiosperms
- Clade: Eudicots
- Clade: Asterids
- Order: Cornales
- Family: Nyssaceae
- Genus: Mastixia; Blume

Synonyms
- Bursinopetalum Wight

= Mastixia =

Mastixia Temporal range: Cenozoic

Genus of trees

Mastixia is a genus of about 19 species of resinous evergreen trees, usually placed in the family Cornaceae. Its range extends from India through Southeast Asia and New Guinea to the Solomon Islands. Mastixia species have alternate or opposite simple broad leaves, many-flowered inflorescences, and blue to purple drupaceous fruits.

The classification of Mastixia is inconsistent due to continuing investigation into its phylogenetic relationships. Although generally placed in Cornaceae, it has also been associated with the family Nyssaceae, when that family is removed from Cornaceae. Mastixia is also sometimes separated, along with the genus Diplopanax, into the family Mastixiaceae.

Fruits of this genus are common Paleocene fossils.

== Species ==
As of July 2014 the World Checklist of Selected Plant Families and The Plant List recognise about 30 accepted taxa (of species and infraspecific names).

- Mastixia arborea (Wight) C.B.Clarke
  - subsp. macrophylla (Thwaites) K.M.Matthew
  - subsp. meziana (Wangerin) K.M.Matthew ex Ramamoorthy
- Mastixia caudatilimba C.Y.Wu ex Soong
- Mastixia congylos Kosterm.
- Mastixia cuspidata Blume
- Mastixia eugenioides K.M.Matthew
- Mastixia euonymoides Prain
- Mastixia glauca K.M.Matthew
- Mastixia kaniensis Melch.
  - subsp. ledermannii (Melch.) K.M.Matthew
- Mastixia macrocarpa K.M.Matthew
- Mastixia macrophylla (Thwaites) Kosterm.
- Mastixia microcarpa Y.C.Liu & H.Peng
- Mastixia montana Kosterm.
- Mastixia nimalii Kosterm. (M. nimali in IUCN)
- Mastixia octandra K.M.Matthew
- Mastixia parviflora H.Zhu
- Mastixia pentandra Blume
  - subsp. cambodiana (Pierre) K.M.Matthew
  - subsp. chinensis (Merr.) K.M.Matthew
  - subsp. philippinensis (Wangerin) K.M.Matthew
  - subsp. scortechinii (King) K.M.Matthew
- Mastixia rostrata Blume
  - subsp. caudatifolia (Merr.) K.M.Matthew
- Mastixia tetrandra (Wight ex Thwaites) C.B.Clarke
- Mastixia tetrapetala Merr.
- Mastixia trichophylla W.P.Fang ex Soong
- Mastixia trichotoma Blume
  - var. clarkeana (King) Danser
  - var. korthalsiana (Wangerin) Danser
  - var. maingayi (C.B.Clarke) Danser
  - var. rhynchocarpa Danser
