= Mastixia cuspidata =

Scientific classification
- Kingdom: Plantae
- Clade: Tracheophytes
- Clade: Angiosperms
- Clade: Eudicots
- Clade: Asterids
- Order: Cornales
- Family: Nyssaceae
- Genus: Mastixia
- Species: M. cuspidata

Binomial name
- Mastixia cuspidata Blume

Synonyms
- Mastixia bracteata C.B.Clarke; Mastixia pentandra var. cuspidata (Blume) Miq.

Species of tree

Mastixia cuspidata is a tree in the family Nyssaceae. The specific epithet cuspidata is from the Latin meaning 'sharp-pointed', referring to the leaf apex.

== Description ==
Mastixia cuspidata grows as a tree measuring up to 40 metres (130 ft) tall with a trunk diameter of up to 40 centimetres (20 in). The smooth to fissured bark is greyish to brown. The flowers are green to yellow. The oblong fruits measure up to 3 cm (1 in) long.

== Distribution and habitat ==
Mastixia cuspidata grows naturally in Sumatra, Peninsular Malaysia and Borneo. Its habitat is mixed dipterocarp forests from sea-level to 900 metres (3,000 ft) altitude.
