= Mastixia macrophylla =

Conservation status
- Vulnerable (IUCN 2.3)

Scientific classification
- Kingdom: Plantae
- Clade: Tracheophytes
- Clade: Angiosperms
- Clade: Eudicots
- Clade: Asterids
- Order: Cornales
- Family: Nyssaceae
- Genus: Mastixia
- Species: M. macrophylla

Binomial name
- Mastixia macrophylla Kosterm.

Species of flowering plant

Mastixia macrophylla is a species of plant in the Nyssaceae family. It is endemic to Sri Lanka.
