= Nyssa spatulata =

Nyssa spatulata Temporal range: Middle Eocene 45-43mya

Scientific classification
- Kingdom: Plantae
- Clade: Tracheophytes
- Clade: Angiosperms
- Clade: Eudicots
- Clade: Asterids
- Order: Cornales
- Family: Nyssaceae
- Genus: Nyssa
- Species: †N. spatulata

Binomial name
- †Nyssa spatulata (Scott) Manchester

Synonyms
- Palaeonyssa spatulata

Extinct species of flowering plant

Nyssa spatulata is an extinct species of flowering plant in the tupelo family, Nyssaceae known from the middle Eocene sediments exposed in north central Oregon. The species was first described from a series of isolated fossil seeds in chert.

== History and classification ==
N. spatulata has been identified from a single location in the Clarno Formation, the Clarno nut beds, type locality for both the formation and the species. The nut beds are approximately 3 kilometres (1.9 mi) east of the unincorporated community of Clarno, Oregon, and considered to be middle Eocene in age, based on averaging zircon fission track radiometric dating which yielded an age of 43.6 and 43.7 ± 10 million years ago and Argon–argon dating radiometric dating which yielded a 36.38 ± 1.31 to 46.8 ± 3.36 mya date. The average of the dates resulted in an age range of 45 to 43 mya. The beds are composed of silica and calcium carbonate cemented tuffaceous sandstones, siltstones, and conglomerates which preserve either a lake delta environment, or alternatively periodic floods and volcanic mudflows preserved with hot spring activity.

The species was described from a series of type specimens, the holotype specimen USNM 422378, which was preserved in the paleobotanical collections of the National Museum of Natural History in Washington, D.C. and four paratype specimens. Two of the paratypes were also in the national Museum collections, while the remaining two were in the University of Florida collections in Gainesville, Florida. The fossils were part of a group of approximately 20,000 specimens collected from 1942 to 1989 by Thomas Bones, Alonzo W. Hancock, R. A. Scott, Steven R. Manchester, and a number of high school students.

The N. spatulata specimens were first studied by graduate student R. A. Scott, who placed the species into the extinct genus Palaeonyssa as Palaeonyssa spatulata, with the 1954 type description of the species appearing in the journal Palaeontographica. Palaeonyssa was first described by Eleanor Reid and Marjorie Chandler from fossils preserved in the London Clay, with them describing several species in the genus. N. spatulata was re-examined by paleobotanist Steven R. Manchester of the University of Florida, who published a 1994 re-description for the species in the Journal Palaeontographica Americana. In the re-description Manchester noted there was very little difference between the extinct genus Palaeonyssa and the modern Nyssa, and deemed the two to be the same genus. The merging resulted in the recombination of Palaeonyssa spatulata as Nyssa spatulata.

== Description ==
The fruits of N. spatulata have a generally rounded triangular to round endocarp in cross-section and are trilocular, similar to the extant N. talamancana. The outline of the endocarps is oblong to ellipsoid, having both apex and base rounded and showing 9 ridges running the length of the endocarp from base to apex. The fruits have an average length of 24 mm (0.94 in) though lengths of 30 mm (1.2 in) are seen. Similarly while the average girth of the fruits is 14.6 mm (0.57 in), thicker fruits reaching 21.5 mm (0.85 in) are known. Each of the three locules has a slit like opening along the upper half of the endocarp, and are separated from each other by a wall of swirling groups of fibers. There is one seed per locule, with the locule having a c-shaped cross section, the chamber opening near the apex and narrowing near the base.
