= Nyssa javanica =

Scientific classification
- Kingdom: Plantae
- Clade: Tracheophytes
- Clade: Angiosperms
- Clade: Eudicots
- Clade: Asterids
- Order: Cornales
- Family: Nyssaceae
- Genus: Nyssa
- Species: N. javanica

Binomial name
- Nyssa javanica (Blume) Wangerin

Synonyms
- List: Agathisanthes javanica Blume; Ceratostachys arborea Blume; Daphniphyllopsis capitata Kurz; Ilex daphnephylloides Kurz; Nyssa arborea (Blume) Koord.; Nyssa leptophylla W.P.Fang & T.P.Chen; Nyssa sessiliflora Hook.f. & Thomson; Nyssa wenshanensis var. longipedunculata W.P.Fang & Soong

Species of plant

Nyssa javanica is a species of flowering plant in the tupelo family Nyssaceae. It is native to the eastern Himalayas, southern China, Southeast Asia, and western Malesia. A deciduous tree typically 30 m (100 ft) tall, it is found growing in evergreen forests at elevations from 100 to 2,500 m (300 to 8,200 ft) above sea level.
