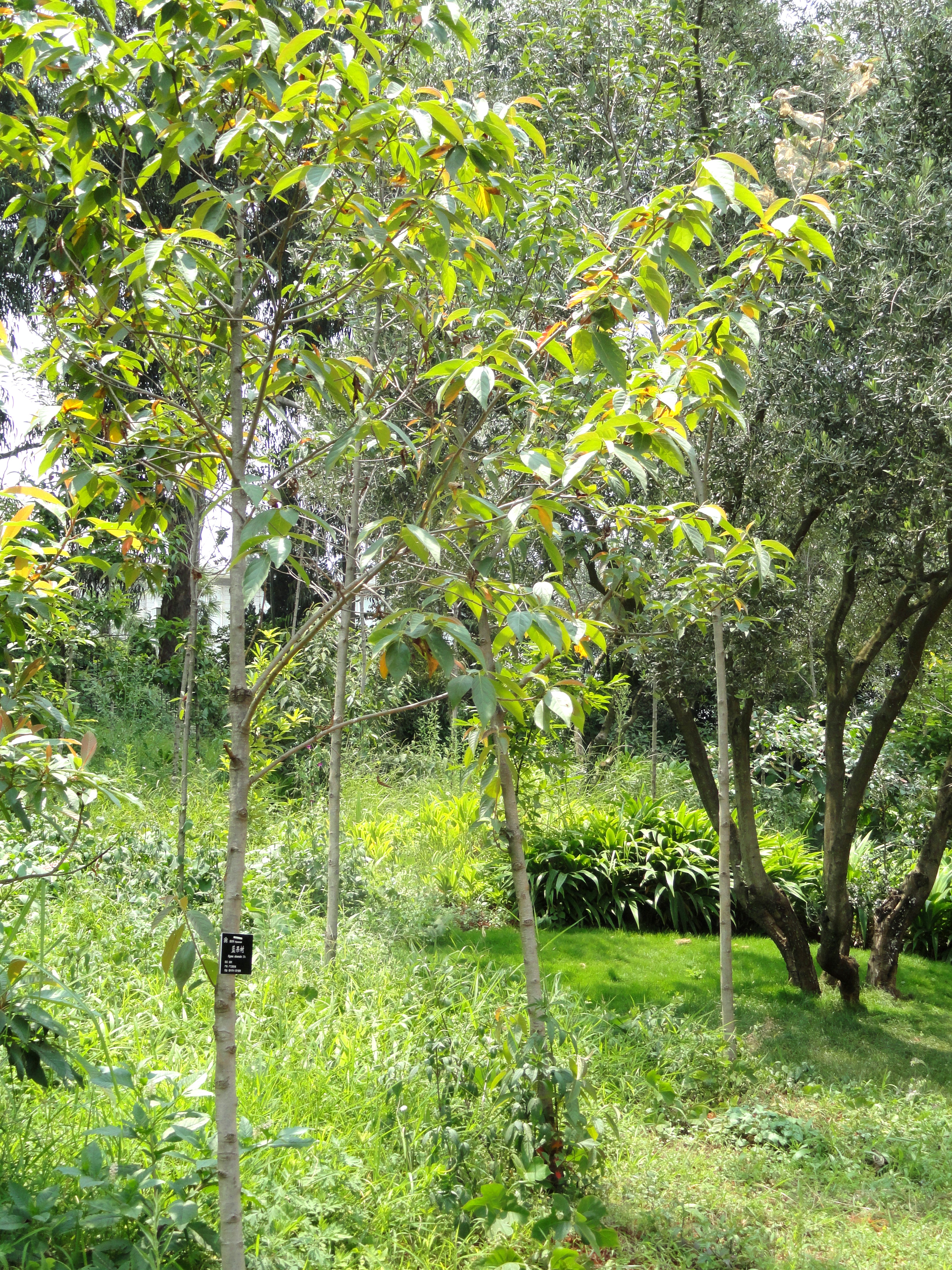
- N. sinensis saplings, Kunming Botanical Garden, China

Scientific classification
- Kingdom: Plantae
- Clade: Tracheophytes
- Clade: Angiosperms
- Clade: Eudicots
- Clade: Asterids
- Order: Cornales
- Family: Nyssaceae
- Genus: Nyssa
- Species: N. sinensis

Binomial name
- Nyssa sinensis Oliv.

= Nyssa sinensis =

Species of tree

Nyssa sinensis (Chinese tupelo) is a species of flowering plant in the family Cornaceae (or Nyssaceae), native to China and Vietnam. Growing to 10 m (33 ft) tall and wide, it is a broadly conical deciduous tree, with oval leaves 15–20 cm (6–8 in) long, which turn brilliant red, orange and yellow in autumn.

Nyssa sinensis is known in cultivation as a more compact version of its relative Nyssa sylvatica (the black tupelo). Both plants, originating from swamps and wetlands, require moist conditions.

The cultivar 'Jim Russell' has gained the Royal Horticultural Society's Award of Garden Merit.
