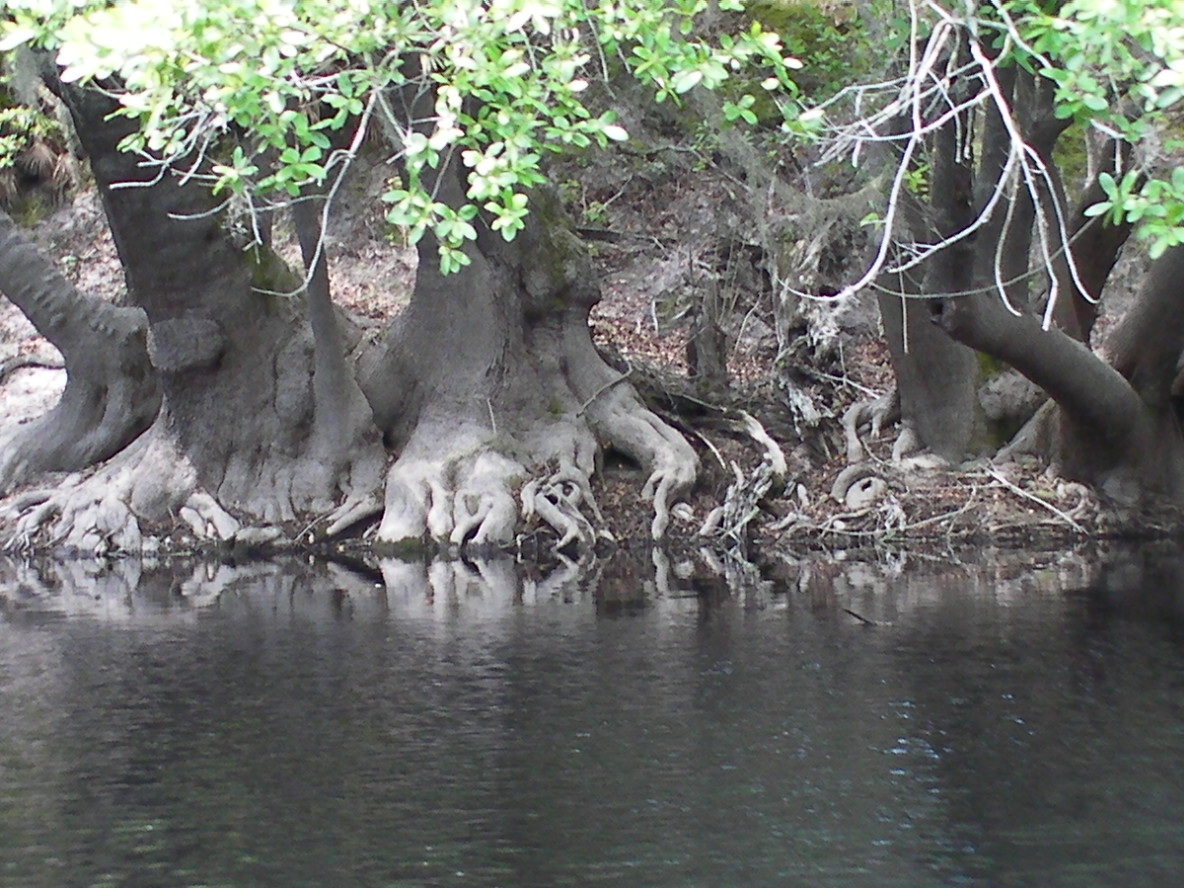
- Ogeechee tupelo trees on the Suwannee River, north

Conservation status
- Least Concern (IUCN 3.1)

Scientific classification
- Kingdom: Plantae
- Clade: Tracheophytes
- Clade: Angiosperms
- Clade: Eudicots
- Clade: Asterids
- Order: Cornales
- Family: Nyssaceae
- Genus: Nyssa
- Species: N. ogeche

Binomial name
- Nyssa ogeche W.Bartram ex Marshall
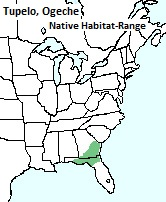
- Native range

= Nyssa ogeche =

Species of tree

Nyssa ogeche, commonly referred to as Ogeechee tupelo, white tupelo, river lime, ogeechee lime tree, sour gum or wild lime is a deciduous tree endemic to the southeastern United States. Growing to 15 m (~50 ft), it is in flower from March to May, and the seeds ripen from August to October. The flowers are pollinated by bees. It is noted for attracting wildlife.

Ogeechee tupelo requires a very moist site and is distributed along the borders of rivers, swamps, and ponds that are frequently inundated. Ogeechee tupelo prefers slow flowing, low water to standing water. It grows naturally from the borders of South Carolina near the coast through the Ogeechee Valley in Georgia to Clay County in northern Florida and Washington County in western Florida. It is found in abundance along the Ogeechee, Altamaha, Suwannee, and Satilla Rivers, and in certain wet flatwood regions between the Choctawhatchee and Wakulla Rivers of Florida.

The wood is light (specific gravity of 0.46), soft, and tough but not strong. It is coarse grained, difficult to split and of little value. The tree is too rare and small for the wood to be economically important.

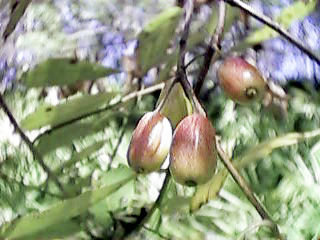
Fruit, referred to as Ogeechee lime

The mature fruit, known as Ogeechee lime, has a subacid flavor. It is made into preserves and can also be used as a substitute for lime juice. The fruit is produced in small clusters of 2–3, is up to 4 centimeters long, and has a thick, juicy, very acidic flesh containing a single seed.

Thousands of hectares of Ogeechee tupelo have been planted in bee farms along the lower Apalachicola River and around swamps where it grows naturally. The honey made from the nectar is known as "tupelo honey."
