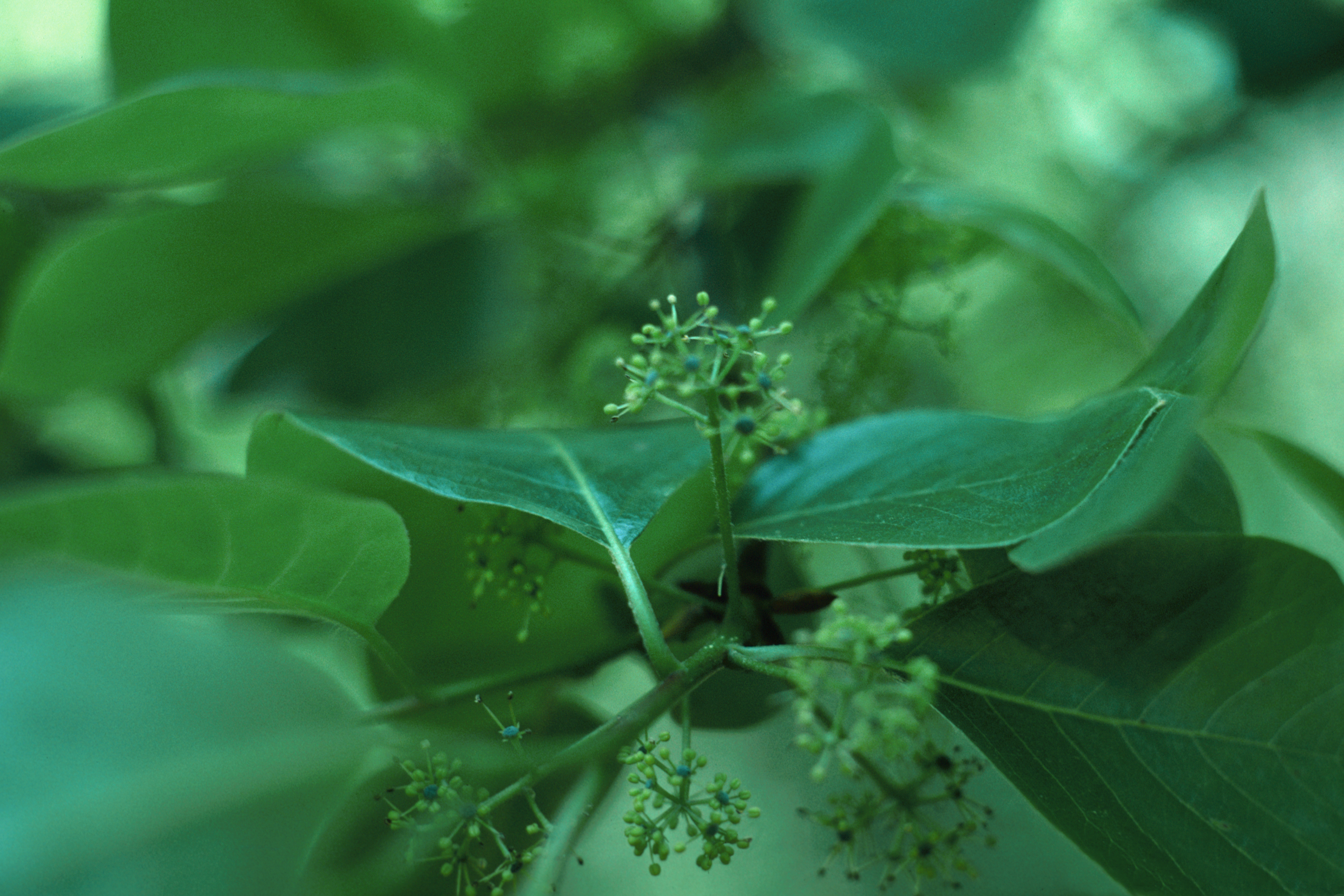
- Nyssa sylvatica foliage and flowers

Scientific classification
- Kingdom: Plantae
- Clade: Tracheophytes
- Clade: Angiosperms
- Clade: Eudicots
- Clade: Asterids
- Order: Cornales
- Family: Nyssaceae
- Genus: Nyssa; Gronov. ex L.

Synonyms
- Tupelo Adans.; Agathisanthes Blume; Ceratostachys Blume; Streblina Raf.; Daphniphyllopsis Kurz

= Tupelo (tree) =

Tupelo Temporal range: Campanian–Recent

Genus of trees

Tupelo /ˈtuːpɪloʊ/, genus Nyssa /ˈnɪsə/, is a small genus of deciduous trees with alternate, simple leaves. It is sometimes included in the subfamily Nyssoideae of the dogwood family, Cornaceae, but is placed by other authorities in the family Nyssaceae, as in the APG IV system.

Most Nyssa species are highly tolerant of wet soils and flooding, and some need such environments as habitat. Some of the species are native to eastern North America, from southeastern Canada through the Eastern United States to Mexico and Central America. Other species are found in eastern and southeastern Asia, from the eastern Himalayas in China south through Indochina to Java.

== Names ==
The genus name Nyssa refers to a Greek water nymph. The name tupelo, the common name used for Nyssa, is of Native American origin, coming from the Creek words ito 'tree' and opilwa 'swamp'; it was in use by the mid-18th century.

The city of Tupelo, Mississippi, is named for this tree.

== Species ==
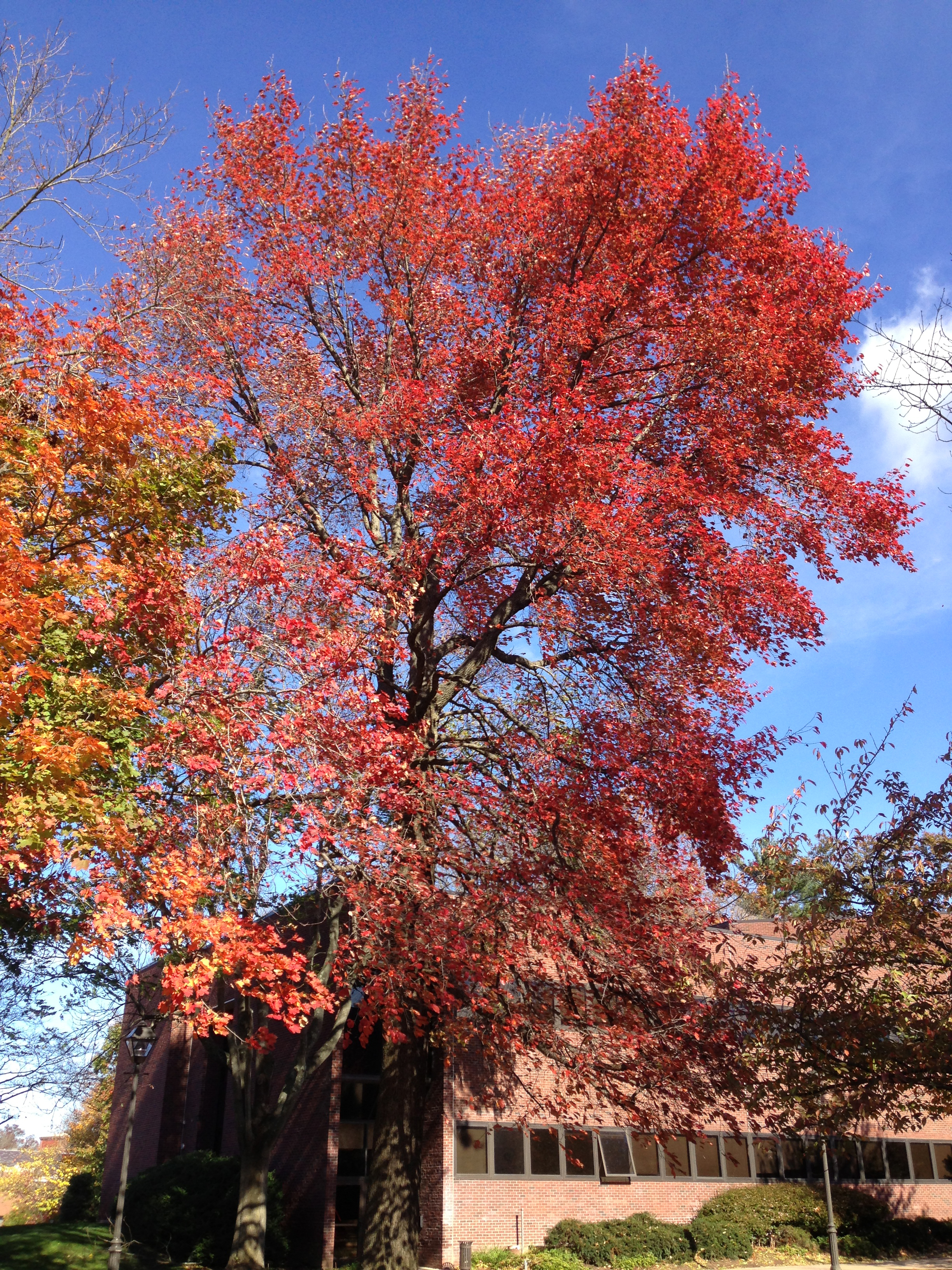
Nyssa sylvatica turning scarlet in autumn

Between seven and ten living species of Nyssa are recognized:

- Nyssa aquatica L. – water tupelo (southeastern United States)
- Nyssa biflora Walter (or Nyssa sylvatica var. biflora) – swamp tupelo, or swamp black-gum
- Nyssa javanica (Blume) Wangerin - Eastern Himalayas, Indochina, Borneo, Java, Sumatra
- Nyssa ogeche W.Bartram ex Marshall – Ogeechee tupelo (southeastern United States)
- Nyssa sinensis Oliv. – Chinese tupelo (southern China, Vietnam, Myanmar)
- †Nyssa spatulata (Scott) Manchester (Extinct, Middle Eocene; Clarno Formation, Oregon)
- Nyssa sylvatica Marshall – black tupelo or black-gum (eastern + central United States; eastern + southern Mexico; Ontario)
- Nyssa talamancana Hammel & N.Zamora - (Panama, Costa Rica)
- †Nyssa texana Berry - (Extinct, late Eocene to early Oligocene, Whitsett and Yeuga Formations, East Texas)
- Nyssa ursina Small - bear tupelo, dwarf black-gum (Florida)
- Nyssa yunnanensis W.C.Yin – Yunnan tupelo (Yunnan)

== Uses ==
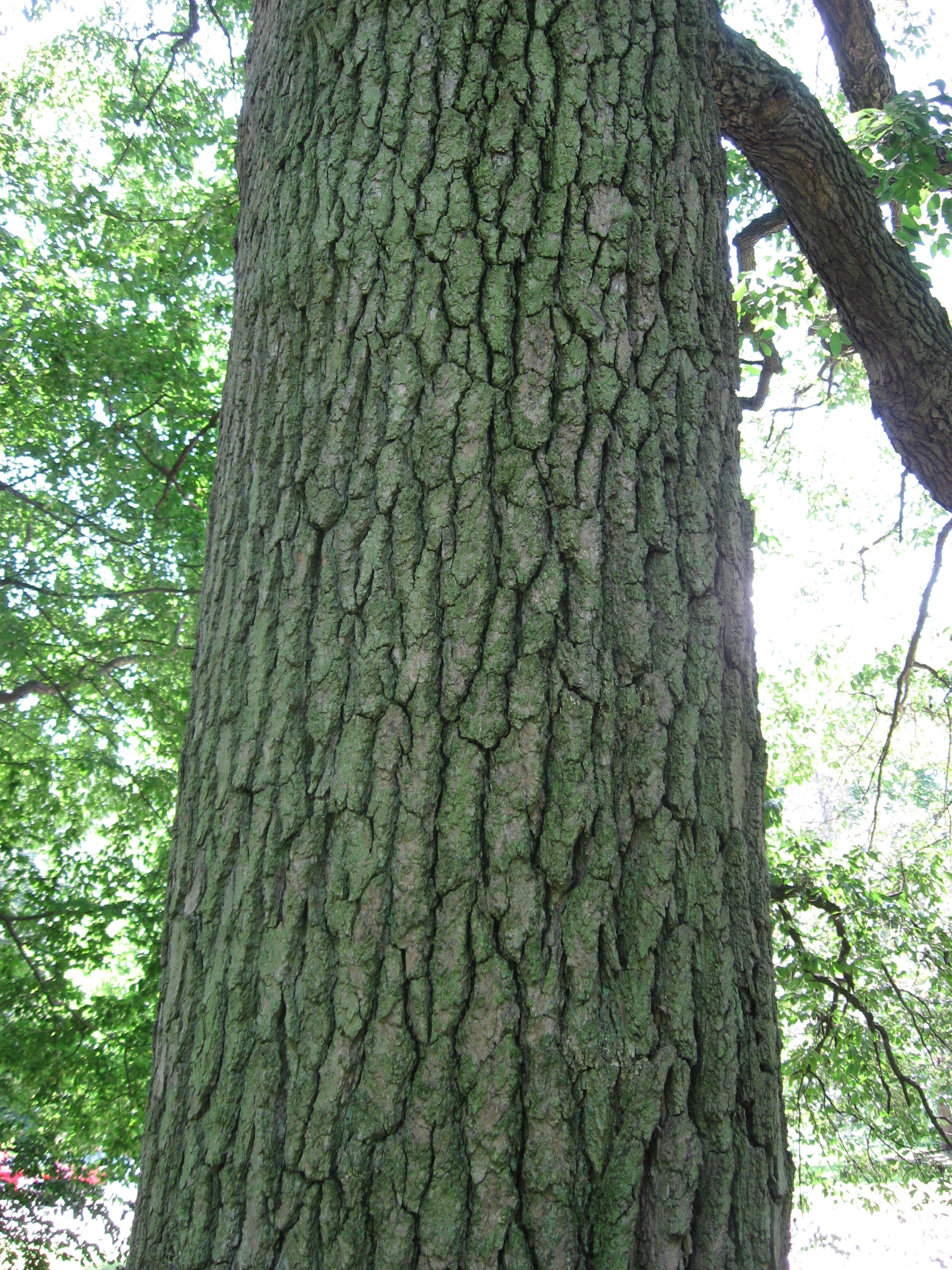
Trunk of a mature Nyssa sylvatica tree

Tupelo wood is used extensively by artistic woodcarvers, especially for carving ducks and other wildfowl. It power carves excellently and holds good detail in the end grain. In commerce, it is used for shipping containers and interior parts of furniture, and is used extensively in the veneer and panel industry for crossbanding, plywood cores, and backs. The wood can be readily pulped and is used for high-grade book and magazine papers. In the past, the hollow trunks were used as "bee gums" to hold beehives.

Tupelos are popular ornamental trees for their mature form, shade, and spectacular autumn leaf colors.

Tupelos are used as food plants by the larvae of some Lepidoptera species, including Endoclita damor.

The Ogeechee Tupelo, sometimes referred to as the Ocheechee Lime, which is native to Georgia and north Florida produces an edible fruit in the form of a sour, oblong drupe.

=== Honey ===
Tupelos of the species Nyssa ogeche are valued as honey plants in the southeastern United States, particularly in the Gulf Coast region. They produce a very light, mild-tasting honey. In Florida, beekeepers keep beehives along the river swamps on platforms or floats during tupelo bloom to produce certified tupelo honey, which commands a high price on the market because of its flavor. Monofloral honey made from the nectar of Nyssa ogeche has such a high ratio of fructose to glucose that it does not crystallize.

The Apalachicola River in the Florida panhandle is the center for tupelo honey. The honey is produced wherever tupelo trees (three species) bloom in the southeastern United States, but the purest and most expensive version (which is certified by pollen analysis) is produced in this valley. In a good harvest year, the tupelo honey crop produced by a group of specialized Florida beekeepers has a value approaching $1,000,000.

== Fossil record ==
Fruits conforming morphologically and anatomically to Nyssa have been identified from the Campanian of Alberta, Canada. The fruits conform to a kind that is common in the Paleogene, formerly in a genus called Palaeonyssa.

== See also ==
- Ulee's Gold, a film about a tupelo honey farmer
