= Diplopanax =

Scientific classification
- Kingdom: Plantae
- Clade: Tracheophytes
- Clade: Angiosperms
- Clade: Eudicots
- Clade: Asterids
- Order: Cornales
- Family: Nyssaceae
- Genus: Diplopanax; Hand.-Mazz.

Species
- D. stachyanthus D. vietnamensis

Genus of plants

Diplopanax is a genus of flowering trees placed in the family Cornaceae or Nyssaceae. Its two known extant species inhabit the wet tropical mountains of Vietnam and southern China. They are broad-leaved evergreen trees with woody fruits and white or yellow flowers.

Diplopanax was originally described from only one species, D. stachyanthus, and placed in the family Araliaceae, but this species was later discovered to be congeneric with Mastixicarpum, a genus of flowering plants known only from fossils and assumed extinct since the Pliocene. (This makes Mastixicarpum an example of a Lazarus genus.) One additional species (D. vietnamensis) was subsequently found and described.

Classification of Diplopanax is inconsistent due to ongoing investigation into its phylogenetic relationships. Although generally placed in Cornaceae, it has also been included in the family Nyssaceae, when that family is removed from Cornaceae. Diplopanax is also sometimes separated, along with the genus Mastixia, into the family Mastixiaceae.
