= K. M. Matthew =

Indian botanist (1930–2004)

Father Dr. K. M. Matthew
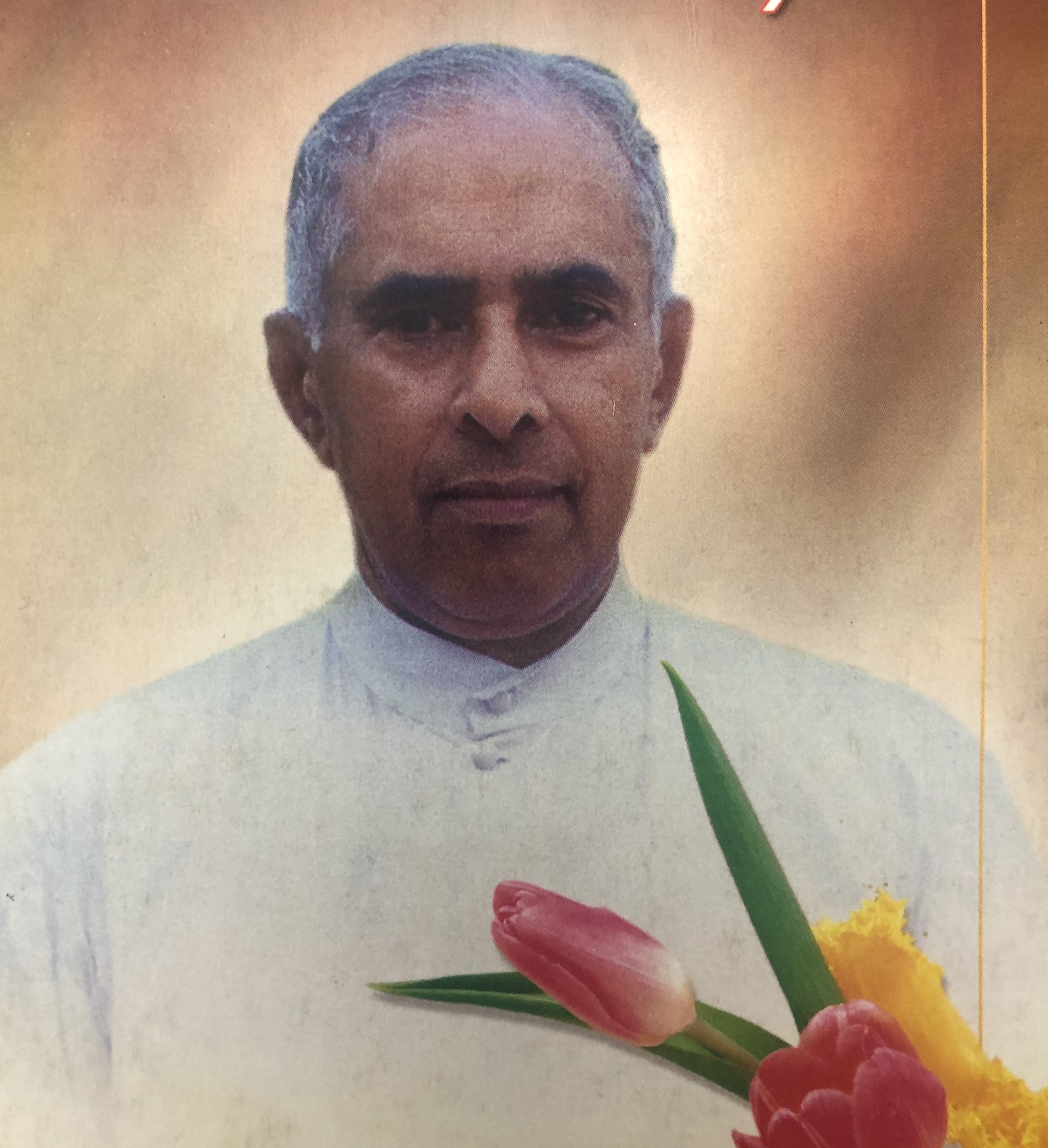
- Born: 16 March 1930; Koyapillil, Ramapuram, Kottayam, Kerala, India
- Died: 16 April 2004 (aged 74); Tiruchirapalli
- Occupation: Botanist
- Known for: Taxonomical research
- Parent(s): Mathai and Teresa
- Awards: Indira Gandhi Paryavaran Puraskar

Koyapillil Mathai Matthew (1930–2004) was an Indian Jesuit priest and botanist. He extensively studied the floral diversity of Tamil Nadu, and published several research papers and books. In 1967, he established the Rapinat Herbarium at St. Joseph's College, Tiruchirappalli.

== Early life and work ==
He was born to Teresa and K. O. Mathai of the Koyapillil family on March 16, 1930 in Ramapuram, Kottayam, Kerala, India. Born into a family of farmers he completed his school education at St. Augustine's High School, Ramapuram, initial collage studies at SB College Changanacherry and moved to Tiruchirapalli for higher studies. He did his bachelor's degree in University of Madras, India and completing his M.Sc. degree during 1958-60, he acquired his doctorate (1960–62) on the alien plants of the Palni hills with the guidance of Hermenegild Santapau and he did his Doctor of Philosophy from University of Bombay in 1963. He also did Master of Science in 1973 from University Reading, United Kingdom.

He extensively carried out field work in Tamil Nadu and this effort resulted in a four-volume The Flora of Tamil Nadu Carnatic. A total of 2020 species was covered in this work. Another contribution is an illustrated Flora entitled the Flora of the Palani Hills in three volumes. He described four new species, one subspecies, and proposed quite a few new combinations. Strobilanthes matthewiana R.W. Scotland has been published in his honour.

== Awards ==
He was awarded the Best Teacher Award of the Tamil Nadu State Government in 1989, ZWO fellowship of the Dutch Government, Leiden, 1978. He was conferred with the Indira Gandhi Paryavaran Puraskar for 2002 under the `individual' category posthumously for his outstanding contribution for the environmental protection.

== Publications ==
- Mathew, K. M; Rapinat Herbarium (1981). The flora of the Tamilnadu Carnatic. Rapinat Herbarium.
- Matthew, K. M (1991). An excursion flora of Central Tamilnadu, India. Oxford & IBH Pub. Co. ISBN 978-81-204-0628-5.
- Matthew, K. M; Matthew, K. M. Illustrations on the flora of the Palni Hills, South India; Matthew, K. M. Supplement to illustrations on the flora of the Palni Hills, South India; Rapinat Herbarium (1999). The flora of the Palni Hills, South India. Rapinat Herbarium. ISBN 978-81-900539-4-5.
