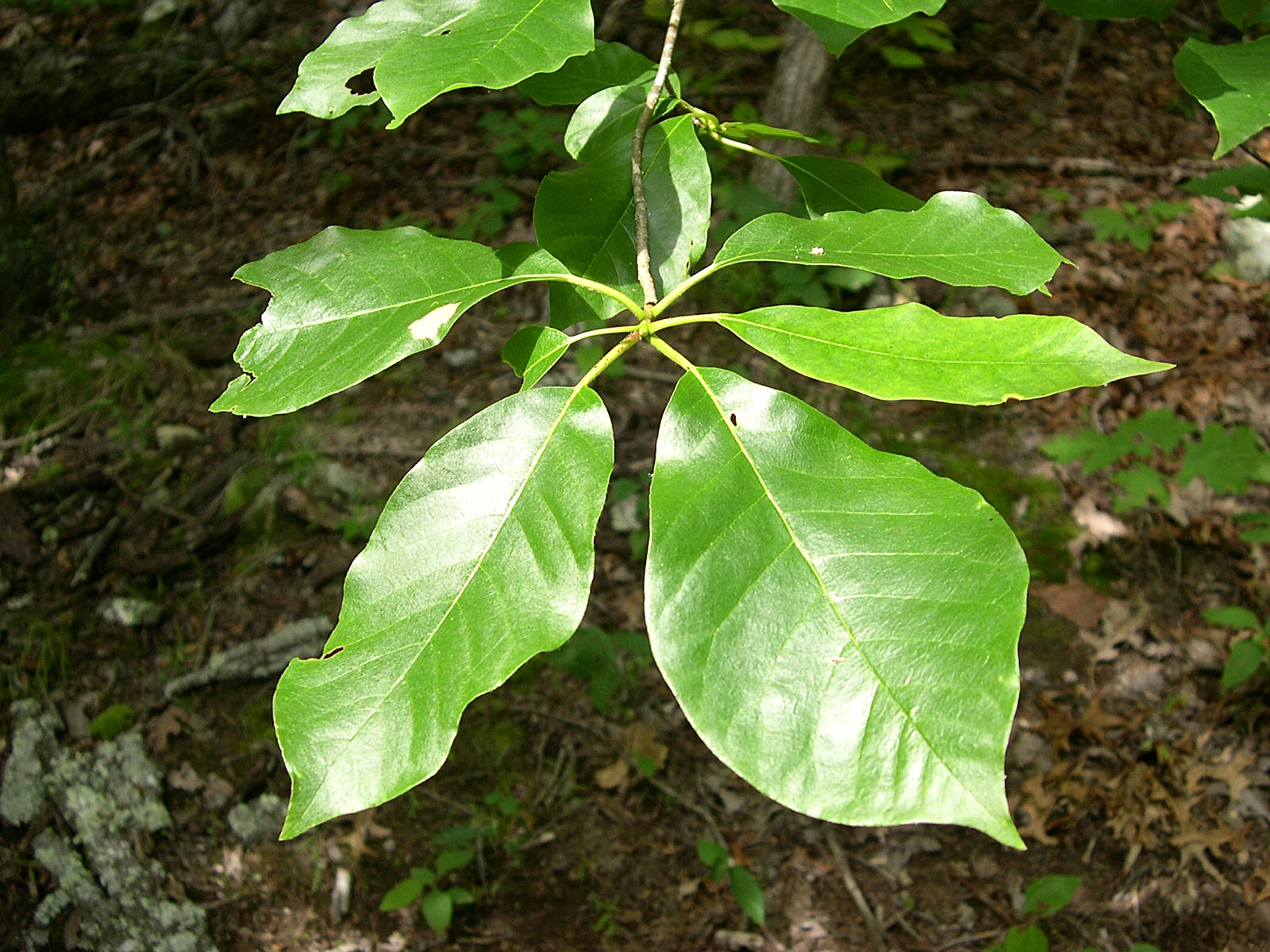
- Nyssa sylvatica foliage

Scientific classification
- Kingdom: Plantae
- Clade: Embryophytes
- Clade: Tracheophytes
- Clade: Angiosperms
- Clade: Eudicots
- Clade: Asterids
- Order: Cornales
- Family: Nyssaceae; Juss. ex Dumort., 1829

= Nyssaceae =

Family of trees

Nyssaceae is a family of flowering trees sometimes included in the dogwood family (Cornaceae). Nyssaceae is composed of 37 known species in the following five genera:

- Camptotheca, the happy trees: two species in China
- Davidia, the dove tree, handkerchief tree, or ghost tree: one species in central China
- Diplopanax: two species in southern China and Vietnam
- Mastixia: about nineteen species from South and Southeast Asia to New Guinea and Solomon Islands
- Nyssa, the tupelos: about 7–10 species in eastern North America and East to Southeast Asia

Among the extinct genera of the family are Mastixicarpum, very similar to Diplopanax, and Tsukada, an extinct relative of Davidia.

In some treatments, Davidia is split into its own family, the Davidiaceae. Diplopanax and Mastixia are also sometimes separated into the family Mastixiaceae. The Angiosperm Phylogeny Group APG III system included the genera of Nyssaceae within Cornaceae. The APG IV system recognizes Nyssaceae as a distinct family
